= List of Ottoman people =

List of Ottoman people is an incomplete list which refers to people who lived in the Ottoman Empire (1299–1922). Naturally, some people who lived in the Empire during its last years, also lived in the early years of the Republic of Turkey, or other countries previously ruled by the Ottoman state.

== Sultans of the ottoman empire ==
- Osman I
- Orhan
- Murad I
- Bayezid I
- Mehmed I
- Murad II
- Mehmed II
- Bayezid II
- Selim I
- Suleiman I
- Selim II
- Murad III
- Mehmed III
- Ahmed I
- Mustafa I
- Osman II
- Murad IV
- Ibrahim
- Mehmed IV
- Suleiman II
- Ahmed II
- Mustafa II
- Ahmed III
- Mahmud I
- Osman III
- Mustafa III
- Abdul Hamid I
- Selim III
- Mustafa IV
- Mahmud II
- Abdulmejid I
- Abdulaziz
- Murad V
- Abdul Hamid II
- Mehmed V
- Mehmed VI
- Abdulmejid II

== Mothers of sultans and ''Valide Sultans" ==
- Halime Hatun
- Malhun Hatun
- Nilüfer Hatun
- Gülçiçek Hatun
- Devlet Hatun
- Emine Hatun
- Hüma Hatun
- Gülbahar Hatun
- Gülbahar Hatun
- Hafsa Sultan
- Hürrem Sultan
- Nurbanu Sultan
- Safiye Sultan
- Handan Sultan
- Halime Sultan
- Mahfiruz Hatun
- Kösem Sultan
- Turhan Sultan
- Saliha Dilaşub Sultan
- Muazzez Sultan
- Rabia Emetullah Gülnuş Sultan
- Saliha Sultan
- Şehsuvar Sultan
- Mihrişah Kadın
- Rabia Şermi Kadın
- Mihrişah Sultan
- Sineperver Sultan
- Nakşidil Sultan
- Bezmiâlem Sultan
- Pertevniyal Sultan
- Şevkefza Sultan
- Tirimüjgan Kadın
- Rahime Perestu Sultan
- Gülcemal Kadın
- Gülistu Kadın

== Male members of the dynasty (other than the sultans) ==
- Ertuğrul
- Alaeddin Pasha
- Süleyman Pasha
- Şehzade Halil
- Savcı Bey
- Süleyman Çelebi
- İsa Çelebi
- Musa Çelebi
- Mustafa Çelebi
- Küçük Mustafa
- Cem Sultan
- Şehzade Ahmet
- Şehzade Korkut
- Şehzade Mustafa
- Şehzade Mehmed
- Şehzade Bayezid
- Şehzade Mahmud
- Şehzade Yusuf Izzeddin
- Şehzade Selim Süleyman
- Abdulmejid II
- Şehzade Mehmed Şevket
- Şehzade Mehmed Seyfeddin
- Şehzade Mehmed Selim
- Şehzade Mehmed Selaheddin
- Şehzade Mehmed Abdülkadir
- Şehzade Mehmed Burhaneddin
- Şehzade Mehmed Abid
- Şehzade Abdurrahim Hayri
- Şehzade Mehmed Ziyaeddin
- Şehzade Ömer Faruk
- Şehzade Ömer Hilmi
- Ahmed IV Nihad
- Osman IV Fuad
- Mehmed Abdulaziz II
- Ali Vâsib
- Mehmed VII Orhan
- Ertuğrul Osman V

== Female members of the dynasty (Other than the mothers and the valide sultans) ==
- Rabia Bala Hatun
- Asporça Hatun
- Theodora Hatun
- Olivera Despina Hatun
- Kera Tamara Hatun
- Hafsa Hatun
- Hatice Halime Hatun
- Mara Despina Hatun
- Gülşah Hatun
- Sittişah Hatun
- Çiçek Hatun
- Nigar Hatun
- Şirin Hatun
- Gülruh Hatun
- Bülbül Hatun
- Hüsnüşah Hatun
- Ferahşad Muhtereme Hatun
- Mahidevran Hatun
- Ayşe Sultan
- Akile Hatun (wife of Osman II)
- Ayşe Sultan
- Şivekar Sultan
- Hümaşah Sultan (wife of Ibrahim)

== Princesses ==
- Adile Sultan
- Aliye Sultan
- Aynışah Hatun
- Ayşe Hatun (daughter of Bayezid II)
- Ayşe Sultan
- Ayşe Sultan (daughter of Ahmed I)
- Ayşe Sultan (daughter of Murad III)
- Ayşe Hümaşah Sultan
- Behice Sultan
- Beyhan Sultan (daughter of Mustafa III)
- Beyhan Sultan (daughter of Selim I)
- Cemile Sultan
- Dürriye Sultan
- Esma Sultan (daughter of Abdülaziz)
- Esma Sultan (daughter of Abdul Hamid I)
- Esma Sultan (daughter of Ahmed III)
- Emine Sultan (daughter of Abdülaziz)
- Emine Sultan (daughter of Mustafa II)
- Fatma Sultan (daughter of Abdulmejid I)
- Fatma Sultan (daughter of Ahmed I)
- Fatma Sultan (daughter of Ahmed III)
- Fatma Sultan (daughter of Murad V)
- Fatma Sultan (daughter of Selim I)
- Fatma Sultan (daughter of Selim II)
- Fehime Sultan
- Gevherhan Hatun
- Gevherhan Sultan (daughter of Ahmed I)
- Gevherhan Sultan (daughter of Selim II)
- Hanzade Sultan (daughter of Ahmed I)
- Hanzade Sultan (daughter of Şehzade Ömer Faruk)
- Hatice Sultan (daughter of Ahmed III)
- Hatice Sultan (daughter of Selim I)
- Hatice Sultan (daughter of Mehmed IV)
- Hatice Sultan (daughter of Murad V)
- Hatice Sultan (daughter of Mustafa III)
- Hümaşah Sultan (daughter of Şehzade Mehmed)
- Ismihan Sultan
- Kaya Sultan
- Lütfiye Sultan
- Mediha Sultan
- Mihrimah Sultan (daughter of Suleiman I)
- Mihrimah Sultan (daughter of Mahmud II)
- Mihrimah Sultan (daughter of Şehzade Ziyaeddin)
- Mihrişah Sultan (daughter of Şehzade Izzeddin)
- Mukbile Sultan
- Münire Sultan
- Münire Sultan (daughter of Şehzade Kemaleddin)
- Naile Sultan (daughter of Abdulmejid I)
- Naile Sultan (daughter of Abdul Hamid II)
- Naime Sultan
- Nefise Hatun
- Necla Sultan
- Nemika Sultan
- Neslişah Sultan (daughter of Şehzade Ömer Faruk)
- Neslişah Sultan (daughter of Şehzade Abdülkadir)
- Raziye Sultan
- Refia Sultan
- Refia Sultan
- Rukiye Sultan
- Sabiha Sultan
- Şadiye Sultan
- Saliha Sultan (daughter of Ahmed III)
- Saliha Sultan (daughter of Mahmud II)
- Saliha Sultan (daughter of Abdülaziz)
- Seniha Sultan
- Şah Sultan (daughter of Selim I)
- Şah Sultan (daughter of Selim II)
- Şah Sultan (daughter of Mustafa III)
- Selçuk Hatun
- Ulviye Sultan
- Ümmi Sultan
- Ümmü Gülsüm Sultan (daughter of Mehmed IV)
- Ümmügülsüm Sultan (daughter of Ahmed III)
- Zekiye Sultan

== Crimean Khans ==
- Meñli I Giray
- Mehmed I Giray
- Sahib I Giray
- Devlet I Giray
- Mehmed IV Giray
- Islam III Giray
- Adil Giray
- Selim I Giray
- Devlet II Giray
- Şahin Giray

== Grand viziers ==
- Alaeddin Pasha
- Nizamüddin Ahmet Pasha
- Hacı Pasha
- Sinanüddin Fakih Yusuf Pasha
- Çandarlı Kara Halil Hayreddin Pasha
- Çandarlı Ali Pasha
- Imamzade Halil Pasha
- Beyazıt Pasha
- Çandarlı Ibrahim Pasha
- Koca Mehmet Nizamüddin Pasha
- Çandarlı Halil Pasha
- Zagan Pasha
- Mahmut Pasha
- Rum Mehmet Pasha
- Ishak Pasha
- Gedik Ahmed Pasha
- Karamani Mehmed Pasha
- Koca Davud Pasha
- Hersekzade Ahmed Pasha
- Çandarlı Ibrahim Pasha (2nd)
- Mesih Pasha
- Hadim Ali Pasha
- Koca Mustafa Pasha
- Dukakinzade Ahmed Pasha
- Hadim Sinan Pasha
- Yunus Pasha
- Piri Mehmed Pasha
- Pargalı Ibrahim Pasha
- Ayas Mehmed Pasha
- Lûtfi Pasha
- Hadim Suleiman Pasha
- Rüstem Pasha
- Kara Ahmed Pasha
- Semiz Ali Pasha
- Sokollu Mehmet Pasha
- Şemiz Ahmed Pasha
- Lala Kara Mustafa Pasha
- Koca Sinan Pasha
- Kanijeli Siyavuş Pasha
- Özdemiroğlu Osman Pasha
- Hadim Mesih Pasha
- Ferhat Pasha
- Lala Mehmet Pasha
- Damad Ibrahim Pasha
- Cigalazade Yusuf Sinan Pasha
- Hadim Hasan Pasha
- Cerrah Mehmed Pasha
- Yemişçi Hasan Pasha
- Yavuz Ali Pasha
- Sokolluzade Mehmet Pasha
- Dervish Mehmed Pasha
- Kuyucu Murat Pasha
- Nasuh Pasha
- Kara Mehmed Pasha
- Damat Halil Pasha
- Güzelce Ali Pasha
- Ohrili Hüseyin Pasha
- Dilaver Pasha
- Kara Davud Pasha
- Mere Hüseyin Pasha
- Lefkeli Mustafa Pasha
- Gürcü Hadim Mehmed Pasha
- Mere Hüseyin Pasha
- Kemankeş Kara Ali Pasha
- Çerkez Mehmet Pasha
- Hafız Ahmet Pasha
- Damat Halil Pasha
- Gazi Hüsrev Pasha
- Hafiz Ahmed Pasha
- Topal Recep Pasha
- Tabanıyassı Mehmet Pasha
- Bayram Pasha
- Tayyar Mehmet Pasha
- Kemankeş Mustafa Pasha
- Sultanzade Mehmet Pasha
- Nevesinli Salih Pasha
- Kara Musa Pasha
- Hezarpare Ahmet Pasha
- Sofu Mehmet Pasha
- Kara Murat Pasha
- Melek Ahmet Pasha
- Abaza Siyavuş Pasha I
- Gürcü Mehmet Pasha
- Tarhoncu Ahmet Pasha
- Derviş Mehmet Pasha
- Ipşiri Mustafa Pasha
- Ermeni Süleyman Pasha
- Gazi Hüseyin Pasha
- Zurnazen Mustafa Pasha
- Abaza Siyavuş Pasha
- Boynuyaralı Mehmet Pasha
- Köprülü Mehmet Pasha
- Köprülü Fazıl Ahmet Pasha
- Merzifonlu Kara Mustafa Pasha
- Bayburtlu Kara Ibrahim Pasha
- Sarı Süleyman Pasha
- Ayaşlı İsmail Pasha
- Bekri Mustafa Pasha
- Köprülü Fazıl Mustafa Pasha
- Arabacı Ali Pasha
- Çalık Ali Pasha
- Bozoklu Mustafa Pasha
- Sürmeli Ali Pasha
- Elmas Mehmet Pasha
- Köprülü Hüseyin Pasha
- Daltaban Mustafa Pasha
- Rami Mehmet Pasha
- Nişancı Ahmet Pasha
- Moralı Hasan Pasha
- Kalaylıkoz Ahmet Pasha
- Baltaci Mehmet Pasha
- Çorlulu Ali Pasha
- Köprülü Numan Pasha
- Gürcü Ağa Yusuf Pasha
- Silahdar Süleyman Pasha
- Kel Hoca Ibrahim Pasha
- Silahdar Damat Ali Pasha
- Hacı Halil Pasha
- Tevkii Mehmet Pasha
- Nevşehirli Damat Ibrahim Pasha
- Silahtar Mehmet Pasha
- Kabakulak Ibrahim Pasha
- Topal Osman Pasha
- Hekimoğlu Ali Pasha
- Gürcü Ismail Pasha
- Silahdar Seyyid Mehmed Pasha
- Muhsinzade Abdullah Pasha
- Yeğen Mehmet Pasha
- Ivaz Mehmed Pasha
- Nişancı Ahmet Pasha
- Seyyid Hasan Pasha
- Tirtaki Mehmet Pasha
- Seyyit Abdullah Pasha
- Divitdar Mehmed Emin Pasha
- Köse Bahir Mustafa Pasha
- Naili Abdullah Pasha
- Silahdar Bıyıklı Ali Pasha
- Yirmisekizzade Mehmed Sait Pasha
- Koca Ragıp Pasha
- Tevkii Hamza Hamid Pasha
- Muhsinzade Mehmet Pasha
- Hamza Mahir Pasha
- Hacı Mehmet Pasha
- Moldovancı Ali Pasha
- Ivazzade Halil Pasha
- Silahdar Mehmet Pasha
- Safranbolulu İzzet Mehmet Pasha
- Moralı Derviş Mehmed Pasha
- Darendeli Cebecizade Mehmed Pasha
- Kalafat Mehmed Pasha
- Seyyit Mehmet Pasha
- İzzet Mehmet Pasha
- Yeğen Hacı Mehmed Pasha
- Halil Hamid Pasha
- Hazinedar Şahin Ali Pasha
- Koca Yusuf Pasha
- Meyyit Hasan Pasha
- Cezayirli Gazi Hasan Pasha
- Çelebizade Şerif Hasan Pasha
- Damad Melek Mehmed Pasha
- Safranbolulu İzzet Mehmet Pasha
- Kör Yusuf Ziyaüddin Pasha
- Hafiz Ismail Pasha
- Ibrahim Hilmi Pasha
- Çelebi Mustafa Pasha
- Alemdar Mustafa Pasha
- Çavuşbaşı Memiş Pasha
- Laz Aziz Ahmed Pasha
- Hurşit Pasha
- Mehmed Emin Rauf Pasha
- Dervish Mehmet Pasha
- Seyyid Ali Pasha
- Benderli Ali Pasha
- Hacı Salih Pasha
- Deli Abdullah Pasha
- Turnacıbaşı Silahdar Ali Pasha
- Mehmet Sait Galip Pasha
- Mehmet Selim Pasha
- Darendeli Mehmet Pasha
- Reşid Mehmet Pasha
- Koca Hüsrev Mehmed Pasha
- Mustafa Reşit Pasha
- Ibrahim Sarim Pasha
- Mehmed Emin Âli Pasha
- Damad Mehmed Ali Pasha
- Mustafa Naili Pasha
- Kıbrıslı Mehmet Emin Pasha
- Mehmet Rüştü Pasha
- Mehmet Fuat Pasha
- Yusuf Kamil Pasha
- Mahmut Nedim Pasha
- Midhat Pasha
- Ahmed Esad Pasha
- Şirvanlı Mehmet Rüştü Pasha
- Hüseyin Avni Pasha
- Ahmed Esad Pasha
- Ibrahim Edhem Pasha
- Ahmet Hamdi Pasha
- Ahmet Vefik Pasha
- Mehmet Sadık Pasha
- Saffet Pasha
- Hayreddin Pasha
- Ahmet Arifi Pasha
- Mehmet Sait Pasha
- Kadri Pasha
- Abdurrahman Nureddin Pasha
- Kâmil Pasha
- Ahmet Cevat Şakir Pasha
- Halil Rifat Pasha
- Mehmet Ferit Pasha
- Hüseyin Hilmi Pasha
- Ahmet Tevfik Pasha
- Ibrahim Hakki Pasha
- Gazi Ahmet Muhtar Pasha
- Mahmut Şevket Pasha
- Said Halim Pasha
- Mehmet Talat Pasha
- Ahmet Izzet Pasha
- Damad Ferid Pasha
- Ali Riza Pasha
- Salih Hulusi Pasha

== Other notable politicians, commanders and the seamen ==
- Turgut Alp
- Gazi Evrenos
- Hacı İlbey
- Lala Şahin Pasha
- Tiryaki Hasan Pasha
- Telli Hasan Pasha
- Özdemir Pasha
- Cezzar Ahmet Pasha
- Ali Pasha
- Muhammed Ali of Egypt
- Gazi Osman Pasha
- Ethem Pasha
- Ahmet Cemal
- Enver Pasha
- Kemal Reis
- Piri Reis
- Oruç Reis
- Barbaros Hayrettin Pasha
- Aydın Reis
- Turgut Reis
- Kurtoğlu Muslihiddin Reis
- Salih Reis
- Murat Reis the Elder
- Seydi Ali Reis
- Piyale Pasha
- Kurtoğlu Hızır Reis
- Müezzinzade Ali Pasha
- Kılıç Ali Pasha
- Mezzo Morto Hüseyin Pasha
- Ulubatlı Hasan
- Yeğen Osman Pasha

== Men of letters, Scientists, Architects, Poets, Musicians and Painters ==
- Aşıkpaşazade
- İdris-i Bitlisi
- Matrakçı Nasuh
- Hoca Sadeddin Efendi
- Mustafa Âlî
- Mustafa Selaniki
- Koçi Bey
- Katip Çelebi
- Evliya Çelebi
- İbrahim Peçevi
- Mustafa Naima
- Ibrāhīm al-Ḥalabī
- Osman Aga of Timişoara
- Hasan (Janissary secretary)
- İbrahim Müteferrika
- Silahdar Findiklili Mehmed Aga
- Yirmisekiz Mehmed Çelebi
- Ahmed Resmî Efendi
- Ahmet Cevdet Pasha
- Ziya Gökalp
- Şerafeddin Sabuncuoğlu
- Ali Kuşçu
- Mirim Çelebi
- Orban
- Takiyuddin
- Hezârfen Ahmet Çelebi
- Lagari Hasan Çelebi
- Erzurumlu İbrahim Hakkı
- Munejjim-bashi Ahmed Dede
- Ak Şemsettin
- Atik Sinan
- Mimar Sinan
- Sedefkar Mehmed Agha
- Mimar Kasım
- Ahmed Karahisari
- Nakkaş Osman
- Hâfiz Osman
- Levni
- Osman Hamdi Bey
- Şahkulu
- Şeker Ahmet Paşa
- Hoca Ali Riza
- Zafer Hanım
- Fitnat Hanım
- Hafız Post
- Buhurizade Itri
- Hampartsoum Limondjian
- Dede Efendi
- Tanburi Büyük Osman Bey
- Hacı Arif Bey
- Tatyos Efendi
- Tamburi Cemil Bey
- Güllü Agop
- Vartan Pasha
- Sheikh Hamdullah
- Ahmet Midhat
- Fatma Aliye
- Veli Can
- Yazıcıoğlu Ali
- Yahya Efendi
- Feridun Ahmed Bey

== Rebels ==
- Sheikh Bedrettin
- Torlak Kemal
- Börklüce Mustafa
- Şahkulu
- Celal
- Baba Zinnun
- Kalender Çelebi
- Karayazıcı
- Abaza Mehmed Pasha
- Abaza Hasan Pasha
- Patrona Halil
- Kabakçı Mustafa
- Tepedelenli Ali Pasha
- Kavalalı Mehmed Ali Pasha
- Atçalı Kel Mehmet

== Scholars ==
- Aaron Zorogon

== See also ==
- List of Turkish people
- Outline of the Ottoman Empire
