= List of Ottoman grand viziers =

Grand vizier of the Ottoman Empire
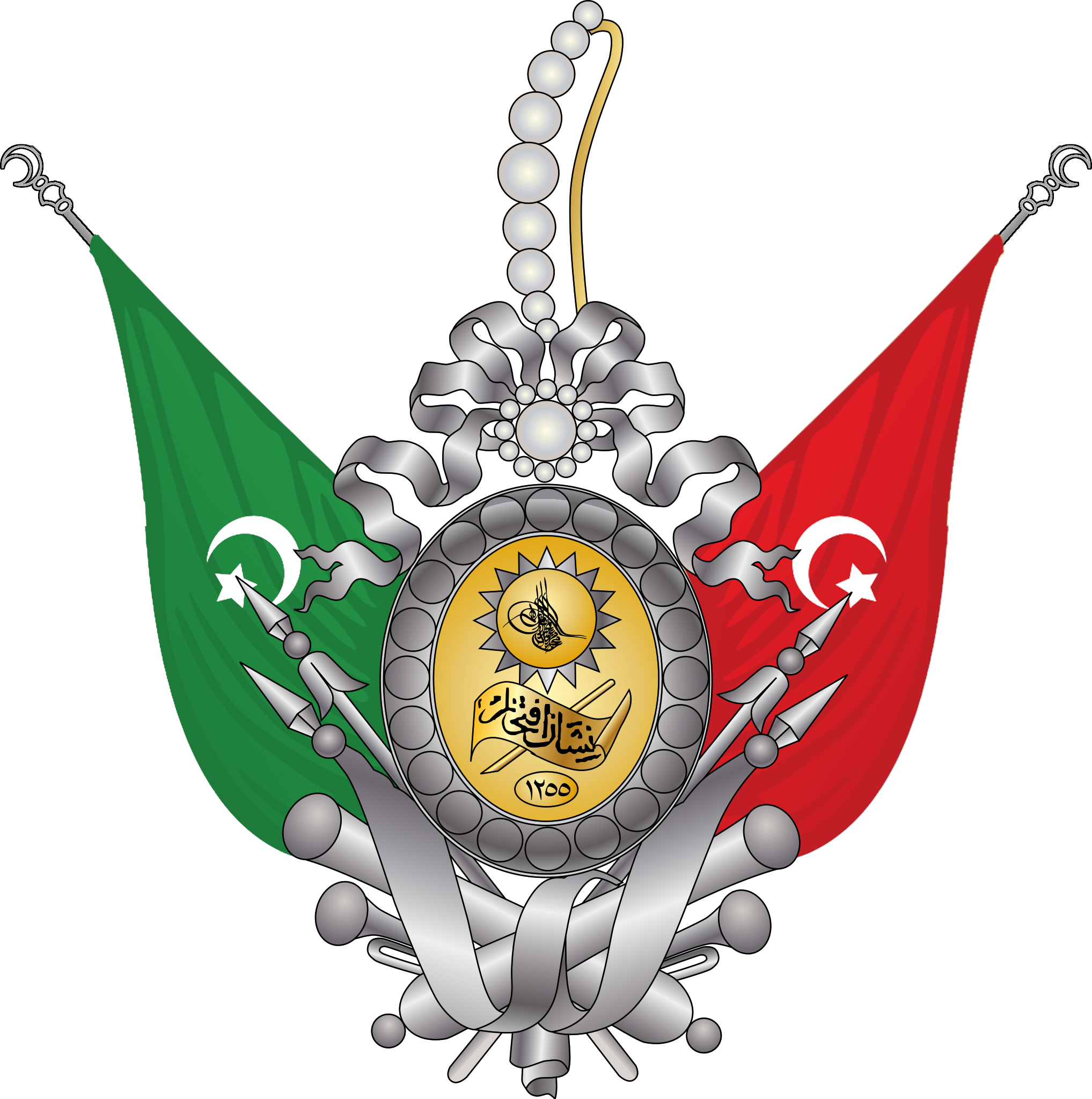
- Coat of arms of the Grand Vizier

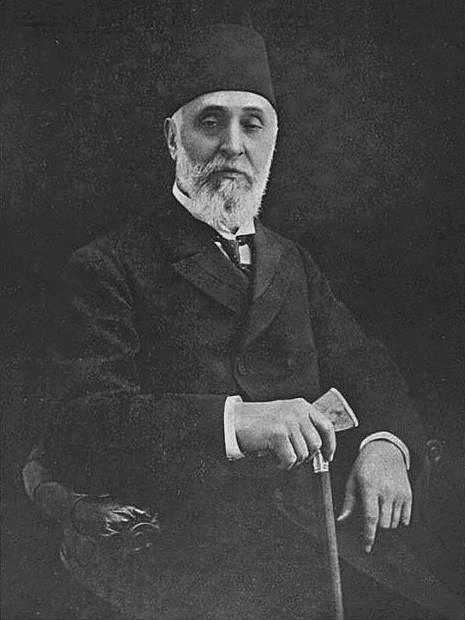
- Last office holder Ahmet Tevfik Pasha; 21 October 1920 – 4 November 1922
- Style: His Excellency
- Residence: Bab-ı Ali
- Appointer: The sultan
- Formation: 1328
- First holder: Alaeddin Pasha
- Final holder: Ahmet Tevfik Pasha
- Abolished: 1 November 1922
- Succession: Prime Minister of Turkey

The grand vizier of the Ottoman Empire (Turkish: Vezir-i Azam or Sadr-ı Azam (Sadrazam); Ottoman Turkish: صدر اعظم or وزیر اعظم) was the de facto prime minister of the sultan, with the absolute power of attorney and, in principle, removable only by the sultan himself in the classical period, before the Tanzimat reforms, or until the 1908 Revolution. He held the imperial seal and could summon all other viziers to attend to affairs of the state in the Imperial Council; the viziers in conference were called "kubbe viziers" in reference to their meeting place, the Kubbealtı ('under-the-dome') in Topkapı Palace. His offices were located at the Sublime Porte.

== History ==
During the emerging phases of the Ottoman state, "vizier" was the only title used. The first of these Ottoman viziers who was titled "grand vizier" was Çandarlı Kara Halil Hayreddin Pasha (also known as Çandarlı Halil Pasha the Elder). The purpose in instituting the title "grand vizier" was to differentiate the holder of the sultan's seal from other viziers. The initially more regularly used title of vezir-i âzam was slowly replaced by sadrazam, both meaning grand vizier in practice. Throughout Ottoman history, the grand viziers have also been called sadr-ı âlî ('high vizier'), vekil-i mutlak ('absolute attorney'), sâhib-i devlet ('holder of the state'), serdar-ı ekrem ('gracious general'), serdar-ı azam ('grand general'), and zât-ı âsafî ('vizieral person') and başnazır, literally "prime minister" in Ottoman Turkish. The Office of the Grand Vizier was called the sadaret.

In the late periods of the Ottoman Empire, especially during and after the 19th century, the grand vizier began to hold a position almost identical to that of a prime minister in other European states. Reforms seen during and after the Tanzimat (1838), the First Constitutional Era (1876–1878), and the Second Constitutional Era (1908–1920) further brought the office of the grand vizier in line with the European standard, making the incumbent the head of a Cabinet of other ministers. During the two constitutional eras, the grand vizier also served as the speaker of the Senate, the upper house of the bicameral Ottoman Parliament. With the establishment of the Republic of Turkey in 1923, the Prime Minister of Turkey took on the roles of the former office.

Grand viziers were often replaced or resigned in rapid succession, frequently leading to political instability. In the final 10 years of the Empire alone, the office of the grand vizier changed hands 13 times between 12 men; some, such as Ahmed Izzet Pasha and Salih Hulusi Pasha, held office for less than a month.

== Office of the Grand Vizierate ==
The Office of the Grand Vizierate was known as the Sadaret-i Uzma, or alternatively the Baş Vekâlet (The Prime Ministry), or Bâb-ı Âli (Literally the Sublime Porte, all the departments under the Vezierate). In 1839, this office included only included the Âmedi-i Divan-ı Hümayun (Office of the Imperial Council).

== List of grand viziers ==
=== Chief viziers (1320–1439) ===
In the early Ottoman beylik, the vizier acted as the sultan’s chief deputy for administration and military affairs. The position began with Alaeddin Pasha (c. 1320–1331) and was later dominated by the Çandarlı family, who helped build the empire’s administrative foundations.

Vizier		Term of office			Sultan
Portrait	Epithet Name (Birth–Death)	Took office	Left office	Time in office	Sultan
	Kemaleddinoğlu Alaeddin Pasha (d. 1331)	1320	1331	11 years	Osman I (1299–1326)
	Kemaleddinoğlu Alaeddin Pasha (d. 1331)	1320	1331	11 years	Orhan (1326–1362)
	Mahmudoğlu Nizamüddin Ahmed Pasha (1281–1380)	1331	1348	17 years	Orhan (1326–1362)
	Mehmet Hacı Pasha (?)	1348	1349	1 year	Orhan (1326–1362)
	Sinanüddin Fakih Yusuf Pasha (d. 1364)	1349	September; 1364 † (Died in office)	15 years	Orhan (1326–1362)
	Sinanüddin Fakih Yusuf Pasha (d. 1364)	1349	September; 1364 † (Died in office)	15 years	Murad I (1362–1389)
	Kara Çandarlızade Halil Hayreddin Pasha (1330–1387)	1364	22 January 1387 † (Died in office)	23 years, 21 days	Murad I (1362–1389)
	Çandarlızade Ali Pasha (d. 1406)	1387	1406 † (Died in office)	19 years	Murad I (1362–1389)
	Çandarlızade Ali Pasha (d. 1406)	1387	1406 † (Died in office)	19 years	Bayezid I (1389–1402)
	Çandarlızade Ali Pasha (d. 1406)	1387	1406 † (Died in office)	19 years	Süleyman Çelebi (1402–1406)
	Osmancıklı; Imamzade Halil Pasha (?)	1406	1413	7 years	Mehmed I (1413–1421)
	Amasyalı; Bayezid Pasha (d. 1421)	1413	July; 1421 † (Fell in battle)	8 years	Mehmed I (1413–1421)
	Amasyalı; Bayezid Pasha (d. 1421)	1413	July; 1421 † (Fell in battle)	8 years	Murad II (1421–1444)
	Çandarlızade Ibrahim Pasha the Elder (d. 1429)	1421	1429 † (Died in office)	8 years	Murad II (1421–1444)
	Koca Amasyalı; Mehmed Nizamüddin Pasha (d. 1439)	1429	1439	10 years	Murad II (1421–1444)

=== Grand Viziers (1439–1839) ===
The position of grand vizier was established with Murad II's appointment of Çandarlızade Halil Pasha the Younger to such a position. In the 19th century, Mahmud II would abolish the title of Grand Vizier, and appointed Mehmed Emin Rauf Pasha as Başvekil, or Prime Minister. Upon Sultan Abdülmecid I's ascention to the throne, the Grand Vizierate was restored.

Grand Vizier		Term of office			Sultan
Portrait	Epithet Name (Birth–Death)	Took office	Left office	Time in office	Sultan
	Çandarlızade Halil Pasha the Younger (d. 1453)	1439	1 June 1453 † (Imprisoned, executed)	14 years, 151 days	Murad II (1446–1451)
	Çandarlızade Halil Pasha the Younger (d. 1453)	1439	1 June 1453 † (Imprisoned, executed)	14 years, 151 days	Mehmed II (1444–1446)
	Çandarlızade Halil Pasha the Younger (d. 1453)	1439	1 June 1453 † (Imprisoned, executed)	14 years, 151 days	Murad II (1446–1451)
	Çandarlızade Halil Pasha the Younger (d. 1453)	1439	1 June 1453 † (Imprisoned, executed)	14 years, 151 days	Mehmed II (1451–1481)
	Zaganos Pasha (d. 1469)	1453	1456	3 years	Mehmed II (1451–1481)
	Mahmud Pasha Angelović (1420–1474); First term	1456	1468	12 years	Mehmed II (1451–1481)
	Rum; Mehmed Pasha (d. 1470)	1468	1469	1 year	Mehmed II (1451–1481)
	Ishak Pasha (d. 1487); First term	1469	1472	3 years	Mehmed II (1451–1481)
	Mahmud Pasha Angelović (1420–1474); Second term	1472	1474 † (Executed)	2 years	Mehmed II (1451–1481)
	Gedik Ahmed Pasha (d. 1482)	1474	1477	3 years	Mehmed II (1451–1481)
	Karamani Mehmed Pasha (d. 1481)	1477	4 May 1481 † (Executed)	4 years	Mehmed II (1451–1481)
	Ishak Pasha (d. 1487); Second term	1481	1482	1 year	Bayezid II (1481–1512)
	Koca; Davud Pasha (1446–1498)	1482	1497	15 years	Bayezid II (1481–1512)
	Hersekzade Ahmed Pasha (1459–1517); First term	1497	1498	1 year	Bayezid II (1481–1512)
	Çandarlızade Ibrahim Pasha the Younger (1429–1499)	1498	1499 † (Died in office)	1 year	Bayezid II (1481–1512)
	Mesih Pasha Palaiologos (d. 1501)	1499	November; 1501 † (Died in office)	2 years	Bayezid II (1481–1512)
	Hadım; Ali Pasha (d. 1511); First term	1501	1503	2 years	Bayezid II (1481–1512)
	Hersekzade Ahmed Pasha (1459–1517); Second term	1503	1506	3 years	Bayezid II (1481–1512)
	Hadım; Ali Pasha (d. 1511); Second term	1506	July; 1511 † (Fell in battle)	5 years	Bayezid II (1481–1512)
	Hersekzade Ahmed Pasha (1459–1517); Third term	1511	1511	59 days	Bayezid II (1481–1512)
	Koca; Mustafa Pasha (d. 1512)	1511	1512 † (Executed)	1 year	Bayezid II (1481–1512)
	Hersekzade Ahmed Pasha (1459–1517); Fourth term	1512	28 November 1514	2 years, 331 days	Selim I (1512–1520)
	Dukakinzade Ahmed Pasha (d. 1515)	18 December 1514	8 September 1515 † (Executed)	264 days	Selim I (1512–1520)
	Hersekzade Ahmed Pasha (1459–1517); Fifth term	8 September 1515	26 April 1516	231 days	Selim I (1512–1520)
	Hadım; Sinan Pasha Borovinić (1459–1517)	26 April 1516	22 January 1517 † (Fell in battle)	271 days	Selim I (1512–1520)
	Yunus Pasha (d. 1517)	22 January 1517	13 September 1517 † (Executed)	234 days	Selim I (1512–1520)
	Piri; Mehmed Pasha (1465–1532)	25 January 1518	27 June 1523	5 years, 153 days	Selim I (1512–1520)
	Piri; Mehmed Pasha (1465–1532)	25 January 1518	27 June 1523	5 years, 153 days	Suleiman I (1520–1566)
	Pargalı; İbrahim Pasha (1495–1536)	27 June 1523	14 March 1536 † (Executed)	12 years, 261 days	Suleiman I (1520–1566)
	Ayas Mehmed Pasha (1483–1539)	14 March 1536	13 July 1539 † (Died in office)	3 years, 121 days	Suleiman I (1520–1566)
	Çelebi; Lütfi Pasha (1488–1564)	13 July 1539	April; 1541	1 year, 262 days	Suleiman I (1520–1566)
	Hadım; Süleyman Pasha (1467–1547)	April; 1541	28 November 1544	3 years, 241 days	Suleiman I (1520–1566)
	Damat; Rüstem Pasha (1500–1561); First term	28 November 1544	6 October 1553	8 years, 312 days	Suleiman I (1520–1566)
	Kara; Ahmed Pasha (d. 1555)	6 October 1553	29 September 1555 † (Executed)	1 year, 358 days	Suleiman I (1520–1566)
	Damat; Rüstem Pasha (1500–1561); Second term	29 September 1555	10 July 1561 † (Died in office)	5 years, 284 days	Suleiman I (1520–1566)
	Semiz Ali Pasha (d. 1565)	10 July 1561	28 June 1565 † (Died in office)	3 years, 353 days	Suleiman I (1520–1566)
	Sokollu; Mehmed Pasha (1506–1579)		12 October 1579 † (Assassinated)	14 years, 106 days	Suleiman I (1520–1566)
	Sokollu; Mehmed Pasha (1506–1579)	28 June 1565	12 October 1579 † (Assassinated)	14 years, 106 days	Selim II (1566–1574)
	Sokollu; Mehmed Pasha (1506–1579)		12 October 1579 † (Assassinated)	14 years, 106 days	Murad III (1574–1595)
	Semiz Ahmed Pasha (1492–1580)	12 October 1579	27 April 1580 † (Died in office)	199 days	Murad III (1574–1595)
	Kara Lala; Mustafa Pasha (1500–1580)	28 April 1580	7 August 1580 † (Died in office)	101 days	Murad III (1574–1595)
	Koca; Sinan Pasha (1506–1596); First term	7 August 1580	6 December 1582	2 years, 121 days	Murad III (1574–1595)
	Kanijeli; Siyavuş Pasha (d. 1602); First term	24 December 1582	25 July 1584	1 year, 214 days	Murad III (1574–1595)
	Özdemiroğlu Osman Pasha (1526–1585)	28 July 1584	29 October 1585 † (Died in office)	1 year, 93 days	Murad III (1574–1595)
	Hadım; Mesih Pasha (d. 1589)	1 November 1585	14 April 1586	164 days	Murad III (1574–1595)
	Kanijeli; Siyavuş Pasha (d. 1602); Second term	14 April 1586	2 April 1589 (Deposed)	2 years, 353 days	Murad III (1574–1595)
	Koca; Sinan Pasha (1506–1596); Second term	14 April 1589	1 August 1591	2 years, 109 days	Murad III (1574–1595)
	Serdar Ferhad Pasha (d. 1595); First term	1 August 1591	4 April 1592	247 days	Murad III (1574–1595)
	Kanijeli; Siyavuş Pasha (d. 1602); Third term	4 April 1592	28 January 1593	299 days	Murad III (1574–1595)
	Koca; Sinan Pasha (1506–1596); Third term	28 January 1593	16 February 1595	2 years, 19 days	Murad III (1574–1595)
	Koca; Sinan Pasha (1506–1596); Third term	28 January 1593	16 February 1595	2 years, 19 days	Mehmed III (1595–1603)
	Serdar Ferhad Pasha (d. 1595); Second term	16 February 1595	7 July 1595	141 days	Mehmed III (1595–1603)
	Koca; Sinan Pasha (1506–1596); Fourth term	7 July 1595	19 November 1595	135 days	Mehmed III (1595–1603)
	Lala Tekeli; Mehmed Pasha (d. 1595)	19 November 1595	28 November 1595 † (Died in office)	9 days	Mehmed III (1595–1603)
	Koca; Sinan Pasha (1506–1596); Fifth term	1 December 1595	3 April 1596 † (Died in office)	124 days	Mehmed III (1595–1603)
	Damat; Ibrahim Pasha (1517–1601); First term	4 April 1596	27 October 1596	206 days	Mehmed III (1595–1603)
	Cığalazâde Yusuf Sinan Pasha (1545–1605)	27 October 1596	5 December 1596	39 days	Mehmed III (1595–1603)
	Damat; Ibrahim Pasha (1517–1601); Second term	5 December 1596	3 November 1597	332 days	Mehmed III (1595–1603)
	Hadım; Hasan Pasha (d. 1598)	3 November 1597	9 April 1598 † (Imprisoned, executed)	157 days	Mehmed III (1595–1603)
	Cerrah; Mehmed Pasha (d. 1604)	9 April 1598	6 January 1599	272 days	Mehmed III (1595–1603)
	Damat; Ibrahim Pasha (1517–1601); Third term	6 January 1599	10 July 1601 † (Died in office)	2 years, 185 days	Mehmed III (1595–1603)
	Damat Yemişçi; Hasan Pasha (1535–1603)	22 July 1601	4 October 1603 † (Executed)	2 years, 74 days	Mehmed III (1595–1603)
	Malkoç Yavuz Ali Pasha (d. 1604)	16 October 1603	26 July 1604 † (Died in office)	253 days	Mehmed III (1595–1603)
	Malkoç Yavuz Ali Pasha (d. 1604)	16 October 1603	26 July 1604 † (Died in office)	253 days	Ahmed I (1603–1617)
	Lala; Sokolluzade Mehmed Pasha (d. 1606)	5 August 1604	21 June 1606 † (Died in office)	1 year, 320 days	Ahmed I (1603–1617)
	Boşnak; Derviş Mehmed Pasha (1569–1606)	21 June 1606	9 December 1606 † (Executed)	171 days	Ahmed I (1603–1617)
	Kuyucu; Murad Pasha (1535–1611)	11 December 1606	5 August 1611 † (Died in office)	4 years, 237 days	Ahmed I (1603–1617)
	Damat Gümülcineli; Nasuh Pasha (d. 1614)	5 August 1611	17 October 1614 † (Executed)	3 years, 73 days	Ahmed I (1603–1617)
	Öküz Kul Kıran; Mehmed Pasha (d. 1619); First term	17 October 1614	17 November 1616	2 years, 31 days	Ahmed I (1603–1617)
	Damat; Halil Pasha (1570–1629); First term		18 January 1619	2 years, 62 days	Ahmed I (1603–1617)
	Damat; Halil Pasha (1570–1629); First term	17 November 1616	18 January 1619	2 years, 62 days	Mustafa I (1617–1618)
	Damat; Halil Pasha (1570–1629); First term		18 January 1619	2 years, 62 days	Osman II (1618–1622)
	Öküz Kul Kıran; Mehmed Pasha (d. 1619); Second term	18 January 1619	23 December 1619 † (Assassinated)	339 days	Osman II (1618–1622)
	Güzelce; Ali Pasha (d. 1621)	23 December 1619	9 March 1621 † (Died in office)	1 year, 76 days	Osman II (1618–1622)
	Ohrili; Hüseyin Pasha (d. 1622); First term	9 March 1621	17 September 1621	192 days	Osman II (1618–1622)
	Dilaver Pasha (d. 1622)	17 September 1621	19 May 1622 † (Lynched)	244 days	Osman II (1618–1622)
	Ohrili; Hüseyin Pasha (d. 1622); Second term	19 May 1622	20 May 1622 † (Lynched)	1 day	Osman II (1618–1622)
	Kara; Davud Pasha (1570–1623)	20 May 1622	13 June 1622 † (Executed)	24 days	Mustafa I (1622–1623)
	Mere; Hüseyin Pasha (d. 1624); First term	13 June 1622	8 July 1622	25 days	Mustafa I (1622–1623)
	Lefkeli; Mustafa Pasha (d. 1648)	8 July 1622	21 September 1622	75 days	Mustafa I (1622–1623)
	Lefkeli; Mustafa Pasha (d. 1648)	8 July 1622	21 September 1622	75 days	Murad IV (1623–1640)
	Hadım; Mehmed Pasha (d. 1626)	21 September 1622	5 February 1623	137 days	Murad IV (1623–1640)
	Mere; Hüseyin Pasha (d. 1624); Second term	5 February 1623	30 August 1623	206 days	Murad IV (1623–1640)
	Kara Kemankeş; Ali Pasha (d. 1624)	30 August 1623	3 April 1624 † (Executed)	217 days	Murad IV (1623–1640)
	Çerkez; Mehmed Ali Pasha (d. 1625)	3 April 1624	28 January 1625 † (Died in office)	300 days	Murad IV (1623–1640)
	Hafız; Müezzinzade Ahmed Pasha (1564–1632); First term	8 February 1625	1 December 1626	1 year, 296 days	Murad IV (1623–1640)
	Damat; Halil Pasha (1570–1629); Second term	1 December 1626	6 April 1628	1 year, 127 days	Murad IV (1623–1640)
	Gazi; Ekrem Hüsrev Pasha (d. 1632)	6 April 1628	25 October 1631	3 years, 202 days	Murad IV (1623–1640)
	Hafız; Müezzinzade Ahmed Pasha (1564–1632); Second term	25 October 1631	10 February 1632 † (Lynched)	108 days	Murad IV (1623–1640)
	Topal; Recep Pasha (d. 1632)	10 February 1632	18 May 1632 † (Executed)	98 days	Murad IV (1623–1640)
	Tabanıyassı; Mehmed Pasha (1589–1637)	18 May 1632	2 February 1637	4 years, 260 days	Murad IV (1623–1640)
	Ladikli; Bayram Pasha (d. 1638)	2 February 1637	26 August 1638	1 year, 205 days	Murad IV (1623–1640)
	Tayyar; Mehmed Pasha (d. 1638)	27 August 1638	24 December 1638 † (Fell in battle)	119 days	Murad IV (1623–1640)
	Kara Kemankeş; Mustafa Pasha (1592–1644)	23 December 1638	31 January 1644 † (Executed)	5 years, 39 days	Murad IV (1623–1640)
	Kara Kemankeş; Mustafa Pasha (1592–1644)	23 December 1638	31 January 1644 † (Executed)	5 years, 39 days	Ibrahim (1640–1648)
	Sultanzade Mehmet Pasha (1603–1646)	31 January 1644	17 December 1645	1 year, 320 days	Ibrahim (1640–1648)
	Nevesinli; Salih Pasha (d. 1647)	17 December 1645	16 September 1647 † (Executed)	1 year, 273 days	Ibrahim (1640–1648)
	Kara; Musa Pasha (d. 1649)	16 September 1647	21 September 1647	5 days	Ibrahim (1640–1648)
	Hazarpare; Ahmet Pasha (d. 1648)	21 September 1647	8 August 1648 † (Lynched)	322 days	Ibrahim (1640–1648)
	Sofu; Mehmed Pasha (d. 1649)	8 August 1648	21 May 1649 † (Exiled, executed)	286 days	Mehmed IV (1648–1687)
	Kara Dev; Murat Pasha (1595–1655); First term	21 May 1649	5 August 1651	2 years, 76 days	Mehmed IV (1648–1687)
	Damat Melek; Ahmed Pasha (1604–1662)	5 August 1651	21 August 1651	16 days	Mehmed IV (1648–1687)
	Abaza; Siyavuş Pasha the Elder (d. 1656)	21 August 1651	27 September 1651	37 days	Mehmed IV (1648–1687)
	Gürcü; Mehmed Pasha (d. 1665)	27 September 1651	20 June 1652	267 days	Mehmed IV (1648–1687)
	Tarhoncu; Ahmed Pasha (d. 1653)	20 June 1652	21 March 1653 † (Executed)	274 days	Mehmed IV (1648–1687)
	Koca; Dervish Mehmed Pasha (d. 1655)	21 March 1653	28 October 1654	1 year, 221 days	Mehmed IV (1648–1687)
	İpşiri Mustafa Pasha (1607–1655)	28 October 1654	11 May 1655 † (Executed)	195 days	Mehmed IV (1648–1687)
	Kara Dev; Murat Pasha (1595–1655); Second term	11 May 1655	19 August 1655	100 days	Mehmed IV (1648–1687)
	Ermeni; Suleyman Pasha (1607–1687)	19 August 1655	28 February 1656	193 days	Mehmed IV (1648–1687)
	Deli Gazi; Hüseyin Pasha (d. 1659)	28 February 1656	5 March 1656	6 days	Mehmed IV (1648–1687)
	Zurnazen Mustafa Pasha (d. 1666)	5 March 1656	5 March 1656 (Deposed)	4 hours	Mehmed IV (1648–1687)
	Abaza; Siyavuş Pasha the Elder (d. 1656)	5 March 1656	25 April 1656 † (Died in office)	51 days	Mehmed IV (1648–1687)
	Boynuyaralı; Mehmed Pasha (d. 1665)	26 April 1656	15 September 1656	142 days	Mehmed IV (1648–1687)
	Köprülü; Mehmed Pasha (1575–1661)	15 September 1656	31 October 1661 † (Died in office)	5 years, 46 days	Mehmed IV (1648–1687)
	Köprülüzade Fazıl Ahmed Pasha (1635–1676)	31 October 1661	3 November 1676 † (Died in office)	15 years, 3 days	Mehmed IV (1648–1687)
	Kara Merzifonlu; Mustafa Pasha (1635–1683)	19 October 1676	25 December 1683 † (Executed)	7 years, 67 days	Mehmed IV (1648–1687)
	Kara; İbrahim Pasha (d. 1687)	15 December 1683	18 November 1685	1 year, 338 days	Mehmed IV (1648–1687)
	Sarı; Süleyman Pasha (d. 1687)	18 November 1685	18 September 1687 † (Deposed)	3 years, 304 days	Mehmed IV (1648–1687)
	Abaza; Siyavuş Pasha the Younger (d. 1688)	18 September 1687	23 February 1688 † (Murdered)	158 days	Mehmed IV (1648–1687)
	Abaza; Siyavuş Pasha the Younger (d. 1688)	18 September 1687	23 February 1688 † (Murdered)	158 days	Suleiman II (1687–1691)
	Ayaşlı; İsmail Kemalettin Pasha (1620–1690)	23 February 1688	2 May 1688	69 days	Suleiman II (1687–1691)
	Bekri; Mustafa Pasha (d. 1690)	30 May 1688	7 November 1689	1 year, 161 days	Suleiman II (1687–1691)
	Gazi; Köprülüzade Fazıl Mustafa Pasha (1637–1691)	10 November 1689	19 August 1691 † (Fell in battle)	1 year, 282 days	Suleiman II (1687–1691)
	Gazi; Köprülüzade Fazıl Mustafa Pasha (1637–1691)	10 November 1689	19 August 1691 † (Fell in battle)	1 year, 282 days	Ahmed II (1691–1695)
	Arabacı; Bahadırzade Ali Pasha (1620–1693)	24 August 1691	21 March 1692	210 days	Ahmed II (1691–1695)
	Hacı; Çalık Ali Pasha (d. 1698)	23 March 1692	17 March 1693	359 days	Ahmed II (1691–1695)
	Bozoklu; Mustafa Pasha (1638–1698)	17 March 1693	13 March 1694	360 days	Ahmed II (1691–1695)
	Sürmeli; Ali Pasha (1645–1695)	13 March 1694	22 April 1695	359 days	Ahmed II (1691–1695)
	Sürmeli; Ali Pasha (1645–1695)	13 March 1694	22 April 1695	359 days	Mustafa II (1695–1703)
	Elmas; Mehmed Pasha (1661–1697)	3 May 1695	11 September 1697 † (Fell in battle)	2 years, 131 days	Mustafa II (1695–1703)
	Amcazade Köprülü Hüseyin Pasha (1644–1702)	17 September 1697	4 September 1702	4 years, 352 days	Mustafa II (1695–1703)
	Daltaban; Mustafa Pasha (d. 1703)	4 September 1702	24 January 1703 † (Executed)	142 days	Mustafa II (1695–1703)
	Rami Mehmed Pasha (1645–1706)	25 January 1703	22 August 1703 (Deposed)	209 days	Mustafa II (1695–1703)
	Nişancı; Kavanoz Ahmed Pasha (d. 1705)	22 August 1703	16 November 1703	86 days	Ahmed III (1703–1730)
	Damat; Hasan Pasha (1658–1713)	18 November 1703	28 September 1704	315 days	Ahmed III (1703–1730)
	Hacı Kalaylıkoz; Ahmed Pasha (d. 1715)	28 September 1704	25 December 1704	88 days	Ahmed III (1703–1730)
	Baltacı; Mehmed Pasha (1652–1712); First term	25 December 1704	3 May 1706	1 year, 129 days	Ahmed III (1703–1730)
	Damat Çorlulu; Ali Pasha (1670–1711)	3 May 1706	15 June 1710	4 years, 43 days	Ahmed III (1703–1730)
	Köprülüzade Numan Pasha (1670–1719)	16 June 1710	17 August 1710	62 days	Ahmed III (1703–1730)
	Baltacı; Mehmed Pasha (1652–1712); Second term	18 August 1710	20 November 1711	1 year, 94 days	Ahmed III (1703–1730)
	Ağa Gürcü; Yusuf Pasha (d. 1713)	20 November 1711	11 November 1712	357 days	Ahmed III (1703–1730)
	Nişancı; Süleyman Pasha (d. 1715)	12 November 1712	6 April 1713	145 days	Ahmed III (1703–1730)
	Hoca Ibrahim Pasha (d. 1713)	6 April 1713	7 April 1713 † (Executed)	1 day	Ahmed III (1703–1730)
	Damat Silahdar; Ali Pasha (1667–1716)	27 April 1713	5 August 1716 † (Fell in battle)	3 years, 100 days	Ahmed III (1703–1730)
	Hacı; Halil Pasha (d. 1733)	21 August 1716	26 August 1717	1 year, 5 days	Ahmed III (1703–1730)
	Nişancı; Mehmed Pasha (d. 1728)	26 August 1717	9 May 1718	256 days	Ahmed III (1703–1730)
	Damat Nevşehirli; Ibrahim Pasha (1662–1730)	9 May 1718	1 October 1730 † (Lynched)	12 years, 145 days	Ahmed III (1703–1730)
	Damat Silahdar; Mehmed Pasha (d. 1737)	16 October 1730	23 January 1731	99 days	Mahmud I (1730–1754)
	Kabakulak; Ibrahim Pasha (d. 1743)	23 January 1731	11 September 1731	231 days	Mahmud I (1730–1754)
	Topal; Osman Pasha (1663–1733)	21 September 1731	12 March 1732	173 days	Mahmud I (1730–1754)
	Hekimoğlu Ali Pasha (1689–1758); First term	12 March 1732	14 July 1735	3 years, 124 days	Mahmud I (1730–1754)
	Gürcü; İsmail Pasha (d. 1738)	14 July 1735	25 December 1735	164 days	Mahmud I (1730–1754)
	Silahdar Seyyid; Mehmed Pasha (d. 1757)	10 January 1736	5 August 1737	1 year, 207 days	Mahmud I (1730–1754)
	Muhsinzade Abdullah Pasha (1661–1757)	22 August 1737	19 December 1737	119 days	Mahmud I (1730–1754)
	Yeğen Mehmed Pasha (d. 1745)	3 December 1737	23 March 1739	1 year, 110 days	Mahmud I (1730–1754)
	İvazzade Mehmed Pasha (d. 1743)	17 March 1739	23 June 1740	1 year, 98 days	Mahmud I (1730–1754)
	Nişancı Kör Hacı; Ahmed Pasha (d. 1753)	22 July 1740	7 April 1742	2 years, 259 days	Mahmud I (1730–1754)
	Hekimoğlu Ali Pasha (1689–1758); Second term	21 April 1742	4 October 1742	166 days	Mahmud I (1730–1754)
	Seyyid; Hasan Pasha (d. 1748)	4 October 1742	10 August 1746	3 years, 310 days	Mahmud I (1730–1754)
	Hacı; Tiryaki Mehmed Pasha (1680–1751)	11 August 1746	24 August 1747	1 year, 13 days	Mahmud I (1730–1754)
	Seyyid; Abdullah Pasha (d. 1760)	24 August 1747	2 January 1750	2 years, 131 days	Mahmud I (1730–1754)
	Divitdar; Mehmed Emin Pasha (d. 1753)	9 January 1750	1 July 1752	2 years, 174 days	Mahmud I (1730–1754)
	Köse; Bahir Mustafa Pasha (d. 1765)	1 July 1752	16 February 1755	2 years, 230 days	Mahmud I (1730–1754)
	Köse; Bahir Mustafa Pasha (d. 1765)	1 July 1752	16 February 1755	2 years, 230 days	Osman III (1754–1757)
	Hekimoğlu Ali Pasha (1689–1758); Third term	16 February 1755	19 May 1755	92 days	Osman III (1754–1757)
	Naili Abdullah Pasha (d. 1758)	19 May 1755	24 August 1755	97 days	Osman III (1754–1757)
	Nişancı Silahdar Bıyıklı; Ali Paşa (d. 1755)	24 August 1755	23 October 1755 † (Executed)	60 days	Osman III (1754–1757)
	Yirmisekizzade Mehmed Said Pasha (d. 1761)	25 October 1755	1 April 1756	159 days	Osman III (1754–1757)
	Köse; Bahir Mustafa Pasha (d. 1765); First term	30 April 1756	3 December 1756	217 days	Osman III (1754–1757)
	Koca; Mehmet Ragıp Pasha (1698–1763)	12 January 1757	8 April 1763 † (Died in office)	6 years, 86 days	Osman III (1754–1757)
	Koca; Mehmet Ragıp Pasha (1698–1763)	12 January 1757	8 April 1763 † (Died in office)	6 years, 86 days	Mustafa III (1757–1774)
	Hamza Hamid Pasha (1688–1770)	11 April 1763	29 September 1763	171 days	Mustafa III (1757–1774)
	Köse; Bahir Mustafa Pasha (d. 1765); Second term	29 September 1763	30 March 1765 † (Dismissed, executed)	1 year, 213 days	Mustafa III (1757–1774)
	Muhsinzade Mehmed Pasha (1704–1774); First term	30 March 1765	7 August 1768	3 years, 130 days	Mustafa III (1757–1774)
	Silahdar; Hamza Mahir Pasha (1727–1771)	7 August 1768	20 October 1768	74 days	Mustafa III (1757–1774)
	Yağlıkçızade Mehmed Emin Pasha (1724–1769)	20 October 1768	12 August 1769 † (Dismissed, executed)	296 days	Mustafa III (1757–1774)
	Moldovancı; Ali Pasha (d. 1773)	12 August 1769	12 December 1769	122 days	Mustafa III (1757–1774)
	İvazzade Halil Pasha (1724–1777)	13 December 1769	25 December 1770	1 year, 12 days	Mustafa III (1757–1774)
	Silahdar Cihangirli; Mehmed Paşa (1710–1788)	25 December 1770	11 December 1771	351 days	Mustafa III (1757–1774)
	Muhsinzade Mehmed Pasha (1704–1774); Second term	11 December 1771	6 August 1774 † (Died in office)	2 years, 238 days	Mustafa III (1757–1774)
	Muhsinzade Mehmed Pasha (1704–1774); Second term	11 December 1771	6 August 1774 † (Died in office)	2 years, 238 days	Abdul Hamid I (1774–1789)
	İzzet Mehmed Pasha (1723–1784); First term	11 August 1774	7 July 1775	330 days	Abdul Hamid I (1774–1789)
	Yağlıkçızade Derviş Mehmed Pasha (1735–1777)	7 July 1775	5 January 1777	1 year, 182 days	Abdul Hamid I (1774–1789)
	Darendeli; Cebecizade Mehmed Pasha (1714–1784)	5 January 1777	1 September 1778	1 year, 239 days	Abdul Hamid I (1774–1789)
	Kalafat; Mehmed Pasha (d. 1792)	1 September 1778	22 August 1779	355 days	Abdul Hamid I (1774–1789)
	Silahdar Seyyid; Mehmed Pasha (1735–1781)	22 August 1779	20 February 1781 † (Died in office)	1 year, 182 days	Abdul Hamid I (1774–1789)
	İzzet Mehmed Pasha (1723–1784); Second term	20 February 1781	25 August 1782	1 year, 186 days	Abdul Hamid I (1774–1789)
	Hacı Yeğen; Mehmed Paşa (1726–1787)	25 August 1782	31 December 1782	128 days	Abdul Hamid I (1774–1789)
	Halil Hamid Pasha (1736–1785)	31 December 1782	30 April 1785 † (Executed)	2 years, 120 days	Abdul Hamid I (1774–1789)
	Şahin Ali Paşa (d. 1789)	30 April 1785	25 January 1786	270 days	Abdul Hamid I (1774–1789)
	Koca; Yusuf Pasha (1730–1800); First term	25 January 1786	28 May 1789	3 years, 123 days	Abdul Hamid I (1774–1789)
	Koca; Yusuf Pasha (1730–1800); First term	25 January 1786	28 May 1789	3 years, 123 days	Selim III (1789–1807)
	Meyyit Kethüda; Hasan Pasha (d. 1810)	28 May 1789	2 January 1790	219 days	Selim III (1789–1807)
	Gazi Cezayirli; Hasan Pasha (1713–1790)	2 January 1790	30 March 1790 † (Died in office)	87 days	Selim III (1789–1807)
	Çelebizade Şerif Hasan Pasha (d. 1791)	16 April 1790	12 February 1791 † (Assassinated)	302 days	Selim III (1789–1807)
	Koca; Yusuf Pasha (1730–1800); Second term	12 February 1791	1792	323 days	Selim III (1789–1807)
	Damat; Melek Mehmed Pasha (1719–1802)	1792	21 October 1794	2 years, 293 days	Selim III (1789–1807)
	Safranbolulu; İzzet Mehmet Pasha (1743–1812)	21 October 1794	23 October 1798	4 years, 2 days	Selim III (1789–1807)
	Kör; Yusuf Ziyaüddin Pasha (d. 1819); First term	23 October 1798	24 June 1805	6 years, 244 days	Selim III (1789–1807)
	Bostancıbaşı Hafız; İsmail Pasha (1758–1807)	24 September 1805	13 October 1806	1 year, 19 days	Selim III (1789–1807)
	Keçiboynuzu; İbrahim Hilmi Pasha (1747–1825)	13 October 1806	3 June 1807	233 days	Selim III (1789–1807)
	Keçiboynuzu; İbrahim Hilmi Pasha (1747–1825)	13 October 1806	3 June 1807	233 days	Mustafa IV (1807–1808)
	Çelebi Mustafa Pasha (d. 1811)	3 June 1807	28 July 1808	1 year, 55 days	Mustafa IV (1807–1808)
	Alemdar/Bayrakdar; Mustafa Pasha (1750–1808)	29 July 1808	15 November 1808 † (Committed suicide)	109 days	Mahmud II (1808–1839)
	Çavuşbaşı; Memiş Pasha (d. 1809)	16 November 1808	December; 1808	15 days	Mahmud II (1808–1839)
	Çarhacı; Ali Pasha (d. 1823)	December; 1808	March; 1809	90 days	Mahmud II (1808–1839)
	Kör; Yusuf Ziyaüddin Pasha (d. 1819); Second term	March; 1809	February; 1811	1 year, 337 days	Mahmud II (1808–1839)
	Laz; Aziz Ahmed Pasha (d. 1819)	February; 1811	July; 1812	1 year, 151 days	Mahmud II (1808–1839)
	Hurşit Ahmed Pasha (d. 1822)	July; 1812	30 March 1815	2 years, 272 days	Mahmud II (1808–1839)
	Mehmed Emin Rauf Pasha (1780–1860); First term	30 March 1815	6 January 1818	2 years, 282 days	Mahmud II (1808–1839)
	Burdurlu; Derviş Mehmed Pasha (1765–1837)	6 January 1818	5 January 1820	1 year, 364 days	Mahmud II (1808–1839)
	Seyyid Ispartalı; Ali Pasha (1756–1826)	5 January 1820	21 April 1821	1 year, 106 days	Mahmud II (1808–1839)
	Benderli; Ali Pasha (d. 1821)	21 April 1821	30 April 1821 † (Executed)	9 days	Mahmud II (1808–1839)
	Hacı İzmirli; Salih Pasha (d. 1828)	30 April 1821	11 November 1822	1 year, 195 days	Mahmud II (1808–1839)
	Bostancıbaşı Deli; Abdullah Pasha (d. 1823)	11 November 1822	4 March 1823	113 days	Mahmud II (1808–1839)
	Silahdar; Turnacızade Ali Pasha (d. 1829)	4 March 1823	13 December 1823	284 days	Mahmud II (1808–1839)
	Mehmed Said Galip Pasha (1763–1829)	13 December 1823	15 September 1824	277 days	Mahmud II (1808–1839)
	Mehmed Selim Pasha (1771–1831)	15 September 1824	26 October 1828	4 years, 41 days	Mahmud II (1808–1839)
	Topal; İzzet Mehmed Pasha (1792–1855); First term	26 October 1828	28 January 1829	94 days	Mahmud II (1808–1839)
	Reşid Mehmed Pasha (1780–1836)	28 January 1829	17 February 1833	4 years, 20 days	Mahmud II (1808–1839)
	Mehmed Emin Rauf Pasha (1780–1860); Second term	17 February 1833	8 July 1839	6 years, 141 days	Mahmud II (1808–1839)
	Mehmed Emin Rauf Pasha (1780–1860); Second term	17 February 1833	8 July 1839	6 years, 141 days	Abdulmejid I (1839–1861)
	Koca; Hüsrev Mehmed Pasha (1769–1855)	8 July 1839	3 November 1839	118 days	Abdulmejid I (1839–1861)
Proclamation of the Gülhane Edict

=== Tanzimat (1839–1876) ===
The Gülhane edict was announced soon after Abdul Mecid's sword girding, ushering in the Tanzimat period, a time of major bureaucratic and administrative reform.

Grand Vizier		Term of office				Sultan
Portrait	Epithet Name (Birth–Death)	Took office		Left office	Time in office	Sultan
	Koca; Hüsrev Mehmed Pasha (1769–1855)	•	3 November 1839	29 May 1841	1 year, 207 days	Abdulmejid I (1839–1861)
	Mehmed Emin Rauf Pasha (1780–1860); Third term	3	29 May 1841	7 October 1841	131 days	Abdulmejid I (1839–1861)
	Topal; İzzet Mehmed Pasha (1792–1855); Second term	2	7 October 1841	3 September 1842	331 days	Abdulmejid I (1839–1861)
	Mehmed Emin Rauf Pasha (1780–1860); Fourth term	4	3 September 1842	31 July 1846	3 years, 331 days	Abdulmejid I (1839–1861)
	Koca; Mustafa Reşid Pasha (1800–1858); First term	1	31 July 1846	28 April 1848	1 year, 272 days	Abdulmejid I (1839–1861)
	İbrahim Sarim Pasha (1801–1853)	•	28 April 1848	13 August 1848	107 days	Abdulmejid I (1839–1861)
	Koca; Mustafa Reşid Pasha (1800–1858); Second term	2	13 August 1848	26 January 1852	3 years, 166 days	Abdulmejid I (1839–1861)
	Mehmed Emin Rauf Pasha (1780–1860); Fifth term	5	27 January 1852	7 March 1852	40 days	Abdulmejid I (1839–1861)
	Koca; Mustafa Reşit Pasha (1800–1858); Third term	3	7 March 1852	7 August 1852	153 days	Abdulmejid I (1839–1861)
	Mehmed Emin Âlî Pasha (1815–1871); First term	1	7 August 1852	4 October 1852	58 days	Abdulmejid I (1839–1861)
	Damat; Mehmed Ali Pasha (1813–1868)	•	4 October 1852	14 May 1853	222 days	Abdulmejid I (1839–1861)
	Mustafa Naili Pasha (1798–1871); First term	1	14 May 1853	30 May 1854	1 year, 16 days	Abdulmejid I (1839–1861)
	Kıbrıslı; Mehmed Emin Pasha (1813–1871); First term	1	30 May 1854	24 November 1854	178 days	Abdulmejid I (1839–1861)
	Koca; Mustafa Reşid Pasha (1800–1858); Fourth term	4	24 November 1854	4 May 1855	161 days	Abdulmejid I (1839–1861)
	Mehmed Emin Âlî Pasha (1815–1871); Second term	2	4 May 1855	1 December 1856	1 year, 211 days	Abdulmejid I (1839–1861)
	Koca; Mustafa Reşid Pasha (1800–1858); Fifth term	5	1 December 1856	2 August 1857	244 days	Abdulmejid I (1839–1861)
	Mustafa Naili Pasha (1798–1871); Second term	2	2 August 1857	23 October 1857	82 days	Abdulmejid I (1839–1861)
	Koca; Mustafa Reşid Pasha (1800–1858); Sixth term	6	23 October 1857	7 January 1858 † (Died in office)	76 days	Abdulmejid I (1839–1861)
	Mehmed Emin Âlî Pasha (1815–1871); Third term	3	11 January 1858	18 October 1859	1 year, 270 days	Abdulmejid I (1839–1861)
	Kıbrıslı; Mehmed Emin Pasha (1813–1871); Second term	2	8 October 1859	24 December 1859	77 days	Abdulmejid I (1839–1861)
	Mütercim; Mehmed Rüşdi Pasha (1811–1882); First term	1	24 December 1859	27 May 1860	155 days	Abdulmejid I (1839–1861)
	Kıbrıslı; Mehmed Emin Pasha (1813–1871); Third term	3	27 May 1860	6 August 1861	1 year, 71 days	Abdulmejid I (1839–1861)
	Kıbrıslı; Mehmed Emin Pasha (1813–1871); Third term	3	27 May 1860	6 August 1861	1 year, 71 days	Abdulaziz (1861–1876)
	Mehmed Emin Âlî Pasha (1815–1871); Fourth term	4	6 August 1861	22 November 1861	108 days	Abdulaziz (1861–1876)
	Keçecizade Mehmed Fuad Pasha (1814–1869); First term	1	22 November 1861	6 January 1863	1 year, 45 days	Abdulaziz (1861–1876)
	Yusuf Kâmil Pasha (1808–1876)	•	6 January 1863	3 June 1863	148 days	Abdulaziz (1861–1876)
	Keçecizade Mehmed Fuad Pasha (1814–1869); Second term	2	3 June 1863	5 June 1866	3 years, 2 days	Abdulaziz (1861–1876)
	Mütercim; Mehmed Rüşdi Pasha (1811–1882); Second term	2	5 June 1866	11 February 1867	251 days	Abdulaziz (1861–1876)
	Mehmed Emin Âlî Pasha (1815–1871); Fifth term	5	11 February 1867	7 September 1871 † (Died in office)	4 years, 208 days	Abdulaziz (1861–1876)
	Mahmud Nedim Pasha (1818–1883); First term	1	7 September 1871	31 July 1872	328 days	Abdulaziz (1861–1876)
	Ahmed Şefik Midhat Pasha (1822–1883); First term	1	31 July 1872	19 October 1872	80 days	Abdulaziz (1861–1876)
	Mütercim; Mehmed Rüşdi Pasha (1811–1882); Third term	3	19 October 1872	15 February 1873	119 days	Abdulaziz (1861–1876)
	Ahmed Esat Pasha (1828–1875); First term	1	15 February 1873	15 April 1873	59 days	Abdulaziz (1861–1876)
	Şirvanizade Mehmed Rüşdi Pasha (1828–1874)	•	15 April 1873	14 February 1874	305 days	Abdulaziz (1861–1876)
	Hüseyin Avni Pasha (1820–1876)	•	14 February 1874	25 April 1875	1 year, 70 days	Abdulaziz (1861–1876)
	Ahmed Esat Pasha (1828–1875); Second term	2	25 April 1875	21 August 1875 † (Died in office)	118 days	Abdulaziz (1861–1876)
	Mahmud Nedim Pasha (1818–1883); Second term	2	21 August 1875	11 May 1876 (Deposed)	264 days	Abdulaziz (1861–1876)
	Mütercim; Mehmed Rüşdi Pasha (1811–1882) Fourth term	4		19 December 1876	221 days	Abdulaziz (1861–1876)
	Mütercim; Mehmed Rüşdi Pasha (1811–1882) Fourth term	4	12 May 1876	19 December 1876	221 days	Murad V (1876)
	Mütercim; Mehmed Rüşdi Pasha (1811–1882) Fourth term	4		19 December 1876	221 days	Abdul Hamid II (1876–1909)
Promulgation of Constitution

=== First Constitutional Monarchy (1876–1878) ===
Under pressure from constitutionalist ministers which overthrew his relatives Abdülaziz and Murad V, Abdülhamid II promulgated a constitution and parliament upon his ascension to the throne.

Grand Vizier		Term of office				Legislature	Title	Sultan
Portrait	Epithet Name (Birth–Death)	Took office		Left office	Time in office	Legislature	Title	Sultan
	Ahmed Şefik Midhat Pasha (1822–1883); Second term	2	19 December 1876	5 February 1877	48 days	—	Grand Vizier	Abdul Hamid II (1876–1909)
	İbrahim Edhem Pasha (1819–1893)	•	5 February 1877	11 January 1878	340 days	—	Grand Vizier	Abdul Hamid II (1876–1909)
	İbrahim Edhem Pasha (1819–1893)	•	5 February 1877	11 January 1878	340 days	I (1876)	Grand Vizier	Abdul Hamid II (1876–1909)
	İbrahim Edhem Pasha (1819–1893)	•	5 February 1877	11 January 1878	340 days	II (1877)	Grand Vizier	Abdul Hamid II (1876–1909)
	Ahmed Hamdi Pasha (1826–1885)	•	11 January 1878	4 February 1878	24 days	II (1877)	Grand Vizier	Abdul Hamid II (1876–1909)
	Ahmed Vefik Pasha (1823–1891); First term	1	4 February 1878	18 April 1878	73 days	II (1877)	Prime Minister	Abdul Hamid II (1876–1909)
Constitution suspended

=== Hamidian viziers (1878–1908) ===
Abdul Hamid II suspended the constitution and parliament in the aftermath of the 1877–1878 Russo Turkish war, and ruled the Ottoman Empire for the next three decades in a personal dictatorship. Opposition politicians dubbed this era of Ottoman history as the era of İstibdat (despotism). Abdul Hamid revived the use of the title Başnazır, or Prime Minister, though he eventually settled on his government chiefs being called Sadr-ı Azam, or Grand Vizier.

Grand Vizier		Term of office				Government	Title	Sultan
Portrait	Epithet Name (Birth–Death)	Took office		Left office	Time in office	Government	Title	Sultan
	Ahmed Vefik Pasha (1823–1891); First term	1	4 February 1878	18 April 1878	73 days	Vefik I	Prime Minister	Abdul Hamid II (1876–1909)
	Mehmed Sadık Pasha (1826–1901)	•	18 April 1878	28 May 1878	40 days	Sadık	Prime Minister	Abdul Hamid II (1876–1909)
	Mütercim; Mehmed Rüşdi Pasha (1811–1882); Fifth term	5	28 May 1878	4 June 1878	7 days	Mütercim Rüşdi V	Grand Vizier	Abdul Hamid II (1876–1909)
	Mehmed Esat Saffet Pasha (1814–1883)	•	4 June 1878	October; 1878	119 days	Saffet	Grand Vizier	Abdul Hamid II (1876–1909)
	Tunuslu; Hayreddin Pasha (1820–1890)	•	October; 1878	28 July 1879	300 days	Hayreddin	Grand Vizier	Abdul Hamid II (1876–1909)
	Ahmed Arifi Pasha (1830–1896)	•	28 July 1879	September; 1879	35 days	Arifi	Prime Minister	Abdul Hamid II (1876–1909)
	Küçük; Mehmed Said Pasha (1838–1914); First term	1	18 October 1879	9 June 1880	235 days	Said I	Prime Minister	Abdul Hamid II (1876–1909)
	Cenânîzade Mehmed Kadrî Pasha (1832–1884)	•	9 June 1880	12 September 1880	95 days	Kadri	Prime Minister	Abdul Hamid II (1876–1909)
	Küçük; Mehmed Said Pasha (1838–1914); Second term	2	12 September 1880	2 May 1882	1 year, 232 days	Said II	Prime Minister	Abdul Hamid II (1876–1909)
	Abdurrahman Nureddin Pasha (1833–1912)	•	2 May 1882	12 July 1882	71 days	Nureddin	Prime Minister	Abdul Hamid II (1876–1909)
	Küçük; Mehmed Said Pasha (1838–1914); Third term	3	12 July 1882	30 November 1882	141 days	Said III	Prime Minister	Abdul Hamid II (1876–1909)
	Ahmed Vefik Pasha (1823–1891); Second term	2	1 December 1882	3 December 1882	2 days	Vefik II	Prime Minister	Abdul Hamid II (1876–1909)
	Küçük; Mehmed Said Pasha (1838–1914); Fourth term	4	3 December 1882	24 September 1885	2 years, 295 days	Said IV	Grand Vizier	Abdul Hamid II (1876–1909)
	Kıbrıslı; Mehmed Kâmil Pasha (1833–1913); First term	1	25 September 1885	4 September 1891	5 years, 344 days	Kâmil I	Grand Vizier	Abdul Hamid II (1876–1909)
	Kabaağaçlızade Ahmed Cevad Şakir Pasha (1851–1900)	•	4 September 1891	8 June 1895	3 years, 277 days	Şakir	Grand Vizier	Abdul Hamid II (1876–1909)
	Küçük; Mehmed Said Pasha (1838–1914); Fifth term	5	9 June 1895	3 October 1895	116 days	Said V	Grand Vizier	Abdul Hamid II (1876–1909)
	Kıbrıslı; Mehmed Kâmil Pasha (1833–1913); Second term	2	3 October 1895	7 November 1895	35 days	Kâmil II	Grand Vizier	Abdul Hamid II (1876–1909)
	Halil Rifat Pasha (1820–1901)	•	7 November 1895	9 November 1901 † (Died in office)	6 years, 2 days	Rifat	Grand Vizier	Abdul Hamid II (1876–1909)
	Küçük; Mehmed Said Pasha (1838–1914); Sixth term	6	13 November 1901	15 January 1903	1 year, 58 days	Said VI	Grand Vizier	Abdul Hamid II (1876–1909)
	Mehmed Ferid Pasha (1851–1914)	•	15 January 1903	22 July 1908	5 years, 189 days	Avyonyalı Ferid	Grand Vizier	Abdul Hamid II (1876–1909)
Young Turk Revolution, constitution repromulgated

=== Second Constitutional Monarchy (1908–1920) ===
The Young Turks force Abdul Hamid II to reinstate the constitution and parliament on 24 July 1908. Political parties were introduced in the Second Constitutional Era.

Union and Progress Party

Liberty Party, Freedom and Accord Party

Turkish National Movement

Grand Vizier		Term of office				Faction/Political Party	Legislature	Sultan
Portrait	Epithet Name (Birth–Death)	Took office		Left office	Time in office	Faction/Political Party	Legislature	Sultan
	Küçük; Mehmed Said Pasha (1838–1914); Seventh term	7	22 July 1908	6 August 1908	15 days	Independent	—	Abdul Hamid II (1876–1909)
	Kıbrıslı; Mehmed Kâmil Pasha (1833–1913); Third term	3	5 August 1908	14 February 1909 (Censored)	193 days	Independent	—	Abdul Hamid II (1876–1909)
	Kıbrıslı; Mehmed Kâmil Pasha (1833–1913); Third term	3	5 August 1908	14 February 1909 (Censored)	193 days	Liberty Party	—	Abdul Hamid II (1876–1909)
	Kıbrıslı; Mehmed Kâmil Pasha (1833–1913); Third term	3	5 August 1908	14 February 1909 (Censored)	193 days	Liberty Party	III (1908)	Abdul Hamid II (1876–1909)
	Hüseyin Hilmi Pasha (1855–1922); First term	1	14 February 1909	14 April 1909 (Deposed)	59 days	Committee of Union and Progress	III (1908)	Abdul Hamid II (1876–1909)
	Ahmed Tevfik Pasha (Okday) (1845–1936); First term	1	14 April 1909	5 May 1909 (Deposed)	21 days	Independent	III (1908)	Abdul Hamid II (1876–1909)
	Ahmed Tevfik Pasha (Okday) (1845–1936); First term	1	14 April 1909	5 May 1909 (Deposed)	21 days	Independent	III (1908)	Mehmed V (1909–1918)
	Hüseyin Hilmi Pasha (1855–1922); Second term	2	5 May 1909	15 August 1909	252 days	Committee of Union and Progress	III (1908)	Mehmed V (1909–1918)
	Hüseyin Hilmi Pasha (1855–1922); Second term	2	15 August 1909	12 January 1910	252 days	Committee of Union and Progress	III (1908)	Mehmed V (1909–1918)
	İbrahim Hakkı Pasha (1862–1918)	•	12 January 1910	30 September 1911	1 year, 261 days	Committee of Union and Progress	III (1908)	Mehmed V (1909–1918)
	Küçük; Mehmed Said Pasha (1838–1914); Eighth and ninth term	8	30 September 1911	31 December 1911	296 days	Committee of Union and Progress	III (1908)	Mehmed V (1909–1918)
	Küçük; Mehmed Said Pasha (1838–1914); Eighth and ninth term	8	30 September 1911	31 December 1911	296 days	Committee of Union and Progress	IV (1912)	Mehmed V (1909–1918)
	Küçük; Mehmed Said Pasha (1838–1914); Eighth and ninth term	9	31 December 1911	22 July 1912 (Deposed)	296 days	Committee of Union and Progress	IV (1912)	Mehmed V (1909–1918)
	Gazi; Ahmed Muhtar Pasha (1839–1919)	•	22 July 1912	29 October 1912	99 days	Independent	IV (1912)	Mehmed V (1909–1918)
	Gazi; Ahmed Muhtar Pasha (1839–1919)	•	22 July 1912	29 October 1912	99 days	Independent	—	Mehmed V (1909–1918)
	Kıbrıslı; Mehmed Kâmil Pasha (1833–1913); Fourth term	4	29 October 1912	23 January 1913 (Deposed)	86 days	Freedom and Accord Party	—	Mehmed V (1909–1918)
	Kıbrıslı; Mehmed Kâmil Pasha (1833–1913); Fourth term	4	29 October 1912	23 January 1913 (Deposed)	86 days	Independent	—	Mehmed V (1909–1918)
	Mahmud Şevket Pasha (1856–1913)	•	23 January 1913	11 June 1913 † (Assassinated)	139 days	Independent	—	Mehmed V (1909–1918)
	Mehmed Said Halim Pasha (1865–1921)	•	12 June 1913	3 February 1917	3 years, 236 days	Committee of Union and Progress	—	Mehmed V (1909–1918)
	Mehmed Said Halim Pasha (1865–1921)	•	12 June 1913	3 February 1917	3 years, 236 days	Committee of Union and Progress	V (1914)	Mehmed V (1909–1918)
	Mehmed Talât Pasha (1874–1921); First and second term	1	4 February 1917	4 July 1918	1 year, 246 days	Committee of Union and Progress	V (1914)	Mehmed V (1909–1918)
	Mehmed Talât Pasha (1874–1921); First and second term	2	4 July 1918	8 October 1918	1 year, 246 days	Committee of Union and Progress	V (1914)	Mehmed VI (1918–1922)
	Ahmed İzzet Pasha (Furgaç) (1864–1937)	•	14 October 1918	11 November 1918	28 days	Committee of Union and Progress	V (1914)	Mehmed VI (1918–1922)
	Ahmed İzzet Pasha (Furgaç) (1864–1937)	•	14 October 1918	11 November 1918	28 days	Independent	V (1914)	Mehmed VI (1918–1922)
	Ahmet Tevfik Pasha (Okday) (1845–1936); Second and third term	2	11 November 1918	12 January 1919	113 days	Independent	V (1914)	Mehmed VI (1918–1922)
	Ahmet Tevfik Pasha (Okday) (1845–1936); Second and third term	2	11 November 1918	12 January 1919	113 days	Independent	—	Mehmed VI (1918–1922)
	Ahmet Tevfik Pasha (Okday) (1845–1936); Second and third term	3	12 January 1919	24 February 1919	113 days	Independent	—	Mehmed VI (1918–1922)
	Ahmet Tevfik Pasha (Okday) (1845–1936); Second and third term	4	24 February 1919	3 March 1919	113 days	Independent	—	Mehmed VI (1918–1922)
	Damat; Mehmed Adil Ferid Pasha (1853–1923); First, second, and third term	1	4 March 1919	15 May 1919	210 days	Independent	—	Mehmed VI (1918–1922)
	Damat; Mehmed Adil Ferid Pasha (1853–1923); First, second, and third term	2	19 May 1919	20 July 1919	210 days	Independent	—	Mehmed VI (1918–1922)
	Damat; Mehmed Adil Ferid Pasha (1853–1923); First, second, and third term	3	21 July 1919	30 September 1919	210 days	Independent	—	Mehmed VI (1918–1922)
	Ali Rıza Pasha (1860–1932)	1	2 October 1919	9 February 1920	153 days	Turkish Nationalist	—	Mehmed VI (1918–1922)
	Ali Rıza Pasha (1860–1932)	1	2 October 1919	9 February 1920	153 days	Turkish Nationalist	VI (1919)	Mehmed VI (1918–1922)
	Ali Rıza Pasha (1860–1932)	2	9 February 1920	3 March 1920	153 days	Turkish Nationalist	VI (1919)	Mehmed VI (1918–1922)
	Salih Hulusi Pasha (Kezrak) (1864–1939)	•	8 March 1920	2 April 1920	25 days	Turkish Nationalist	VI (1919)	Mehmed VI (1918–1922)
Constitution suspended

=== Last grand viziers (1920–1922) ===
Following the end of the Second Constitutional Era in 1920, the Ottoman Empire was in a state of diarchy, with the government based in Constantinople and the government based in Ankara both asserting themselves as the legitimate Turkish government. Mehmed VI abolished the constitution and suspended parliament when the Chamber of Deputies voted in support of the National Pact in the Turkish War of Independence.

Grand Vizier		Term of office				Faction/ Political party	Sultan
Portrait	Epithet Name (Birth–Death)	Took office		Left office	Time in office	Faction/ Political party	Sultan
	Damat; Mehmed Adil Ferid Pasha (1853–1923); Fourth and Fifth terms	4	5 April 1920	July 31 1920	199 days	Independent	Mehmed VI (1918–1922)
	Damat; Mehmed Adil Ferid Pasha (1853–1923); Fourth and Fifth terms	5	July 31 1920	21 October 1920	199 days	Independent	Mehmed VI (1918–1922)
	Ahmet Tevfik Pasha (Okday) (1845–1936); Fourth term	5	21 October 1920	4 November 1922	2 years, 14 days	Independent	Mehmed VI (1918–1922)
End of the Ottoman Sultanate

During the Conference of London, Ahmet Tevfik Pasha recognized the ambassador of the Grand National Assembly as the legitimate government of Turkey. On 1 November 1922, the Grand National Assembly voted to abolish the Sultanate. Ahmet Tevfik Pasha was the last grand vizier of the Ottoman Empire, and resigned from the premiership on November 4, 1922, without a replacement.

== See also ==
- List of sultans of the Ottoman Empire
- Mabeyn-i hümayun
- List of Kapudan Pashas
