= Hasan Pasha =

Hasan Pasha or Hassan Pasha may refer to:

- Hasan Pasha (son of Barbarossa) (c. 1517–1572), Ottoman governor of Algiers
- Hasan Pasha of Temeşvar (fl. 1594), Ottoman governor of Temeşvar
- Hassan Pasha (Mamluk) (ruled 1704–1723), first ruler of the Mamluk dynasty of Iraq
- Hasan Pasha (fl. 1804), Ottoman governor of Belgrade
- Hasan Fehmi Pasha (1836–1910), Ottoman statesman
- Hasan Rami Pasha (1842–1923), Ottoman admiral and naval minister
- Hasan Tahsin Pasha (1845–1918), Ottoman military officer
- Hasan Enver Pasha (1857–1928), Ottoman soldier
- Hasan Rıza Pasha (1871–1913), Ottoman general
- Hasan Izzet Pasha (1871–1931), Ottoman general
- Hassan Sabry Pasha (1879–1940), Egyptian politician
- Telli Hasan Pasha (1530–1593), Ottoman governor of Bosnia
- Sokulluzade Hasan Pasha (died 1602), Ottoman governor of Damascus and Baghdad
- Yemişçi Hasan Pasha (1535–1603), Ottoman Grand Vizier
- Abaza Hasan Pasha (died 1659), Ottoman governor and leader of several major rebellions
- Mollacık Hasan Pasha (died 1700), Ottoman warden of Rhodes and governor of Egypt, Baghdad, and Shahrizor
- Damat Hasan Pasha (1658–1713), Ottoman Grand Vizier and governor of Egypt
- Macar Hacı Hasan Pasha (died 1768), Ottoman Kapudan Pasha and governor of Egypt
- Cezayirli Gazi Hasan Pasha (1713–1790), Ottoman captain, Kapudan Pasha and grand vizier
- Cenaze Hasan Pasha (died 1810), Ottoman Grand Vizier

== See also ==
- Hasanpaşa (disambiguation)
