= Janissary revolts =

Series of military revolts during the Ottoman Empire

The janissary revolts were a series of revolts by slave soldiers known as janissaries in the Ottoman Empire.

== Revolts ==
- Buçuktepe rebellion (1446)
- Yenibahçe uprising (1512)
- Janissary revolt (1525)
- Beylerbeyi event (1589)
- the Ottoman Disaster (1621–1622)
- Çınar incident (1656)
- Odjak of Algiers Revolution (1659)
- Revolutions of Tunis (1675-1705)
- Edirne Incident (1703)
- Naqib al-Ashraf revolt (1703–1705)
- Karamanli coup (1711)
- Patrona Halil revolt (1730)
- Rebellion of Osman Pazvantoğlu (1793–1807)
- Edirne incident (1806)
- Kabakçı Mustafa revolt (1807)
- Alemdar revolt (1808)
- Janissary revolt in Tunisia (1811)
- Auspicious Incident (1826)
