= Saraganda =

Town of ancient Pisidia

Coordinates: 37°15′32″N 29°52′11″E

Saraganda was a town of ancient Pisidia inhabited during Roman times.

Its site is located near Hasanpaşa, in Asiatic Turkey.
