= Cendere, Nallıhan =

Cendere
- Neighbourhood
- Location in Turkey Cendere (Turkey Central Anatolia)
- Coordinates: 40.1934°N 31.1226°E
- Country: Turkey
- Province: Ankara
- District: Nallıhan
- Population (2022): 59
- Time zone: UTC+3 (TRT)

Cendere (historically known as Çandar) is a neighbourhood in the municipality and district of Nallıhan, Ankara Province, Turkey. Its population is 59 (2022).

Despite its small size today, during the early days of the Ottoman Empire, Cendere (then named Çandar) was an important town, and the politically powerful and wealthy Çandarlı family originated from the village, as did the first Grand Vizier of the Ottoman Empire, Alaeddin Pasha.

== See also ==
- Çandarlı family
