= Beylerbeyi event =

Military conflict

Beylerbeyi event (Turkish: Beylerbeyi Vakası) was a revolt in the Ottoman Empire in response to currency debasement in April 1589, during the reign of Murat III.

== Background ==
During the Ottoman–Safavid War (1578–1590), the Ottoman military expenditures increased sharply. Meanwhile, state revenues began to decrease because of Jelali revolts in Anatolia. The result was a budget deficit. Murat III decided to devalue the coins. Between the reign of Suleyman the Magnificent and his grandson Murat, the value of a gold coin rose from 63 akçes (silver coin as the Ottoman monetary unit) to 120 akçes. The ensuing economic crisis hit the fixed income of servants and slave soldiers, such as janissaries.

== Rebellion ==
The janissaries revolted demanding a rise in their salary. They further asked for the execution of two Ottoman civil servants. One of them, Mahmut Efendi, was the chief treasurer (Turkish: defterdar). The other one was Doğancı Mehmet Pasha, the beylerbey (high governor) of Rumeli who was accused of being the sultan's advisor in devaluation. Although the sultan initially tried to protect his prestige and two of his subordinates, he finally gave up. At the end of the negotiations, the salaries were increased and the two civil servants were sacrificed. They were immediately killed by the janissaries. The Grand Vizier Kanijeli Siyavuş Pasha was fortunate, for he was only dismissed from his post.

Following the rebellion of janissaries the sipahis also revolted demanding a rise in their salaries. But during the negotiations in the palace yard, an unidentified person in the crowd gave a command to attack the sipahis and the bostanjis (palace guards) caught sipahis off guard, killing about 400 of them. This ended the sipahi rebellion.

== Constantinople riots ==
The Beylerbey incident was the first example of military revolts, in which civil servants were killed by soldiers. In the following years, a number of civil servants and even the sultan (Osman II) in one case, were killed in more serious riots by soldiers. Historians call such riots and rebellions Constantinople rebellions (Turkish: İstanbul İsyanları).
