= Haji Salih Pasha =

Grand Vizier of the Ottoman Empire (1821-1822)

Haji Salih Pasha (died 1828) was Ottoman grand vizier in 1821–1822, under Sultan Mahmud II.

== Early career ==
Salih was born probably between 1760 and 1770 in Smyrna, probably to a Greek family. At some point, he moved to Istanbul and converted to Islam. By 1813, he was kapıcıbaşı in charge of barley. Later he was minister in charge of gunpowder (baruthâne nâzırı). In 1820, while still in charge of gunpowder, he was promoted to vizier and put in charge of the sancak of Çirmen. When Benderli Ali Pasha was made grand vizier on March 29, 1821, Salih acted as his deputy in Istanbul until he arrived there. At the same time, Salih was in charge of the sancak of Edirne and of Çirmen.

== Grand vizierate ==
Salih was made grand vizier on the dismissal of Benderli Ali Pasha on April 30, 1821. His short grand vizierate was spent dealing with the Greek Revolution. Events in Morea, Rumelia, and Anatolia all led to unrest in Istanbul and required increased public security measures, especially in critical locations such as gunpowder factories. A decree to disarm the Greek population had been issued on March 31, 1821, but its implementation was left to Salih. The sultan’s edict appointing him grand vizier also gave him "absolute independence" ("bi’l-istiklâl vekâlet-i mutlaka") to bring the Greeks under control.

On the second day of his grand vizierate, he had 12 Greeks executed, including the archpriest of Arnavutköy. Soon after, he had 7 more executed. The executions and the news of massacres committed by Greek revolutionaries excited portions of the Muslim population in Istanbul, leading to more incidents. At some point in his grand vizierate, Salih is reported to have had former Greek patriarch Cyril VI and many Greek leaders (kocabaşı) and other prominent community members executed as rebels. (Patriarch Gregory V, the metropolitans of Kayseri, Izmit, and Tarabya, and the Greek translators of the Imperial Council had been executed before Salih became grand vizier.)

Salih also had to put down rebellion in the Ayvalık region, gain the cooperation of Albanian groups in fighting the Greeks, find funds to hire mercenaries, control violence in the Muslim population, and create unity among the Muslims of the empire.

Within the government, Salih was in conflict with the influential Halet Efendi. At one point, Salih and Şeyhülislâm Yasincizade Abdülvehhab Efendi discovered that Halet Efendi had been derelict in his duty because the imperial storehouses were not properly full and the needs of the shipyards had not been met. Further, since Janissary support for Halet was waning, Salih considered this an appropriate time to do away with Halet. However, Halet acted preemptively and succeeded in having Salih and the şeyhülislâm dismissed.

The grand vizier’s seal was taken from Salih on November 10, 1822, and he was sent to the Balıkhane Pavilion, a place of execution in Topkapı Palace. After a few hours awaiting execution there, Salih was exiled to Gelibolu. Salih learned that he would not be subject to confiscation and that he had been dismissed to appease the Janissaries. (The şeyhülislâm was also dismissed at the same time and exiled to Iznik. Nevertheless, their rival Halet Efendi did not remain in power long; he was soon dismissed, exiled, and then executed.)

== Later career ==
After his dismissal, Salih was governor (vali) of Anatolia in February 1823, then a few months later, governor of Damascus. In addition, he became emîr-i hac (official in charge of the security of pilgrims performing hajj) and also performed the hajj himself. In January 1824, he was made guardian (muhafız) of Kars and governor (mutasarrıf) of Doğubayazıt. In 1825 or 1827 he was appointed governor of Kayseri and Bozok. In 1826, he was made governor of Damascus again. In 1827 or 1828, he was exiled to Konya, where he died in 1828.

== Legacy ==
His daughter Behiye died in 1834, his wife Ayşe Hoşedâ in 1859, and his daughter Şâkire in 1868; all were buried in Eyüp Cemetery in Istanbul. His son Ahmed İzzet Bey died in 1894-95, at age 100, and was also buried in Eyüp.

Salih had fountains built in Safranbolu (1819) and in Sarıyer, Istanbul (1822). A şadırvan was built in İzmir (1828) in his memory by Çeşmeli Ahmed Reşid Efendi.
