= Rum Mehmed Pasha =

Grand Vizier of the Ottoman Empire from 1466 to 1469

Grand Vizier of the Ottoman Empire
- In office 1466–1469
- Monarch: Mehmed II
- Preceded by: Mahmud Pasha Angelović
- Succeeded by: Ishak Pasha

Personal details
- Died: 1474 (?) Constantinople, Ottoman Empire
- Spouse: Fülane Hatun (daughter of Lütfî Bey of Alâiyye)
- Children: Hasan Pasha

Rum Mehmed Pasha (Ottoman Turkish: روم محمد پاشا; Turkish: Rum Mehmed Paşa; fl. 1466 – d. 1474 (?)) was an Ottoman statesman, known for being the grand vizier of the Ottoman Empire from 1466 to 1469 and the main rival of Mahmud Pasha Angelović. As his name suggests, he was of Greek descent.

Upon the urging of Karamanlı Mehmet Pasha, Sultan Mehmed II the Conqueror dismissed Rum Mehmed Pasha from office in 1469 and had him executed by drowning in 1474.

== Family ==
=== Consorts ===
Fülane Hatun–daughter of Lütfî Bey, the Bey of Alaiye

=== Children ===
Hasan Pasha

Political offices
Preceded by Mahmud Pasha Angelovic	Grand Vizier of the Ottoman Empire; 1466–1469	Succeeded by Ishak Pasha
