= Nişancı Süleyman Pasha =

Grand Vizier of the Ottoman Empire from 1712 to 1713

Grand Vizier of the Ottoman Empire
- In office 12 November 1712 – 4 April 1713
- Monarch: Ahmet III
- Preceded by: Ağa Yusuf Pasha
- Succeeded by: Hoca İbrahim Pasha

Personal details
- Died: 1715 Rhodes, Eyalet of the Archipelago

Nişancı Süleyman Pasha (also known as Silahdar Süleyman Pasha, died 1715) was an 18th-century high-ranking Ottoman civil servant and grand vizier.

== Biography ==
Süleyman Pasha was of Abazin origin. In 1705, he was appointed governor of Aleppo, then in Ottoman Syria. He also served on Euboea an island in Ottoman Greece and Cyprus. In 1709, he was promoted to the high post of a nişancı, court reporter.

On 12 November 1712, he was appointed grand vizier. The main diplomatic problem during his office term was the fate of the King Charles XII of Sweden, who was residing in Ottoman lands after his defeat by the Russian forces in the Battle of Poltava (1709). When Charles XII refused to return to his country Sweden, Süleyman Pasha moved his residence from Bender in Ottoman Moldova to Didymoteicho in Ottoman Greece. But Ottoman Sultan Ahmet III (reigned 1703–1730) did not approve this policy towards a guest of the Empire.

On 4 April 1713, he was dismissed from the post of grand vizier. Although he was then appointed Kapudan Pasha, grand admiral, of the Ottoman Navy, he was accused of corruption, and in November 1713, he was exiled to the island Kos in Ottoman Greece. The next year, he was transferred to Rhodos, another Ottoman Greek island. In 1715, he was executed.
