= Moralı Ibrahim Pasha =

Ottoman statesman and grand admiral

Moralı Ibrahim Pasha ("Ibrahim Pasha of Morea"; died April or May 1725), also known as Aşçı Ibrahim Pasha ("the Cook") or Hacı Ibrahim Pasha or Ibrahim Pasha al-Kapudan, was an Ottoman statesman and grand admiral (Kapudan Pasha, 1707–09, 1717–18).

Ibrahim Pasha served as the Ottoman governor of Egypt Eyalet (1709–10) but was then jailed and exiled to Sinop. After being pardoned in 1713, he was appointed to the governorship of Aleppo Eyalet (1714, 1717), Sidon Eyalet (1714–16), Sanjak of Jerusalem (1716), and Damascus Eyalet (1716).

In his second term as Kapudan Pasha, he reportedly destroyed a Venetian navy fleet. He died in April or May 1725. Today, there is a street in Istanbul named after him (Moralı İbrahim Paşa Sokak).

== See also ==
- List of Kapudan Pashas
- List of Ottoman governors of Egypt
- List of Ottoman governors of Damascus

Political offices
Preceded by Damat Hasan Pasha	Ottoman Governor of Egypt; 1709–1710	Succeeded by Köse Halil Pasha
