= Janissary revolt (1525) =

- Part of Janissary revolts
Date	25 March 1525
Location	Istanbul, Ottoman Empire
Result	Revolt suppressed

Belligerents
Ottoman Empire	Janissaries

Commanders and leaders
(Ottoman Empire) Suleiman I	Mustafa Agha (executed); Kıran Bali (executed); Haydar Çelebi (executed)

While hunting in the Kağıthane plains in March 1525, Sultan Suleiman I was informed of a Janissary uprising in Istanbul. It was instigated by the Janissary Agha, a bitter enemy of the Pargalı Ibrahim Pasha. The men, too, longed for a conquest, not having had one in a long time. Ibrahim Pasha was returning to Istanbul, after having crushed the rebellion of the renegade Ahmed Pasha in Egypt. The Janissary revolt was suppressed immediately, and the Janissary Agha Mustafa Agha, his steward Kıran Bali, and the Chief Scribe Haydar Çelebi were executed. The revolt took place on the 25th of March.

== Sources ==
- Raymond, André (2001). Cairo: City of History. Translated by Willard Wood (Harvard ed.). Cairo, Egypt; New York, New York: American University in Cairo Press. p. 191. ISBN 978-977-424-660-9.
- Sakaoğlu, Necdet (April 2012). Süleyman, Hurrem ve Diğerleri: Bir Dönemin Gerçek Hikayesi. p. 5.
- Çelebi, Celâlzâde Mustafa (February 2011). Kanunî'nin Tarihçisinden Muhteşem Çağ. Istanbul: Kariyer Yayıncılık. p. 106. ISBN 978-9944-300-59-9.
- Somel, Selcuk Aksin (March 2010). The A to Z of the Ottoman Empire. Bloomsbury Publishing. p. 34. ISBN 9798216214601.
