= Izzet Mehmed Pasha =

Grand Vizier of the Ottoman Empire (1774–1775, 1781–1782)

Grand Vizier of the Ottoman Empire
- In office 10 August 1774 – 7 July 1775
- Monarch: Abdülhamit I
- Preceded by: Muhsinzade Mehmed Pasha
- Succeeded by: Moralı Dervish Mehmed Pasha
- In office 20 February 1781 – 25 August 1782
- Monarch: Abdülhamit I
- Preceded by: Silahdar Seyyid Mehmed Pasha
- Succeeded by: Yeğen Hacı Mehmed Pasha

Ottoman Governor of Egypt
- In office 1775 – 15 July 1778
- Preceded by: Hacı Ibrahim Pasha
- Succeeded by: Raif Ismail Pasha

Personal details
- Born: 1723
- Died: February 1784 (aged 60–61) Belgrade, Ottoman Serbia

Izzet Mehmed Pasha (1723 – February 1784, Belgrade) was an Ottoman statesman who served as the Grand Vizier of the Ottoman Empire twice, first from 1774 to 1775, and second from 1781 to 1782.

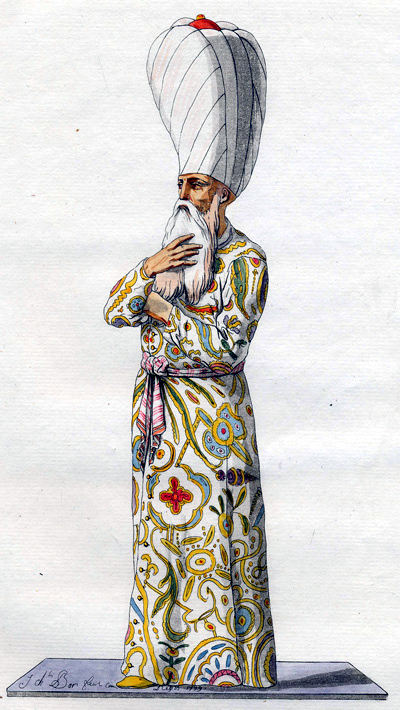
Painting of a councilor to the Sultan of Egypt during Mamluk rule.

Towards the end of Russo-Turkish War (1768-1774), he was the sadaret kaymakamı, deputy to the grand vizier who served in the absence of the grand vizier. Sultan Abdülhamit I appointed him as grand vizier on 10 August 1774. His first term ended on 7 July 1775. Six years later, while he was serving as the governor of Erzurum Eyalet, he was reappointed as the grand vizier on 20 February 1781. His main task was reforming the army which was unsuccessful in the war. But in this task he failed to satisfy the sultan, and furthermore, a fire in Istanbul caused great damage and riots, leading to his dismissal by the sultan on 25 August 1782 and exile to Plovdiv.

Apart from the grand viziership, Izzet Mehmed Pasha also held other high-level posts. He became a vizier on 6 July 1774, and he served as the Ottoman governor of Aidin (1775), Egypt (1775–78), Sivas (1778–79), Erzurum (1779, 1780–81), Rakka (1779–80), and Belgrade (1783–84).

He died in February 1784 in Belgrade while in office as its governor.

== See also ==
- List of Ottoman grand viziers
- List of Ottoman governors of Egypt
- Belgrade

Political offices
Preceded by Muhsinzade Mehmet Pasha	Grand Vizier of the Ottoman Empire; 10 August 1774 – 7 July 1775	Succeeded by Moralı Derviş Mehmet Pasha
Preceded by Hacı Ibrahim Pasha	Ottoman Governor of Egypt; 1775 – 15 July 1778	Succeeded by Raif Ismail Pasha
Preceded by Silahdar Seyyid Mehmed Pasha	Grand Vizier of the Ottoman Empire; 20 February 1781 – 25 August 1782	Succeeded by Yeğen Hacı Mehmet Pasha
