= Nişancı =

Post in the Ottoman Empire

Nişancı was a high post in Ottoman bureaucracy. The Turkish word nişancı literally means "court calligrapher" or "sealer", as the original duty of the nişancı was to seal royal precepts.

== History ==
Although the post of the court calligrapher was established during the reign of Orhan (1324–1361), the name nişancı came into use during the reign of Murat II (1421–1451). According to the law of Mehmet II (1451–1481), the nişancı was a member of the divan (Ottoman government). Beginning in the mid-18th century, the post lost its former importance, and in 1836, it was abolished.

== Duties of the nişancı ==
The nişancı was responsible for sealing the precepts of the sultan and the grand vizier. The nişancı was also responsible in supervising the divan's archives and keeping the records of the timar system (lands granted and taxation authority by the Ottoman sultans to bureaucrats and sipahi soldiers in return for their services). Up until the 17th century, the post of nişancı was also the equivalent of foreign minister. However, during the reign of Mehmet IV (1648–1687), reisülküttap (literally "the chief of clerks"), a post previously subordinate to that of the nişancı, replaced nişancı as the Ottoman Empire's foreign ministry.

== Grand viziers of Nisancı origin ==
- Karamanlı Mehmet Pasha (1477–1481)
- Ayaşlı İsmail Pasha (1688–1688)
- Elmas Mehmet Pasha (1695–1697)
- Nişancı Süleyman Pasha (1709-1712)
- Nişancı Ahmet Pasha (1740–1742)
