= Ivazzade Halil Pasha =

Grand Vizier of the Ottoman Empire from 1769 to 1770

Ivazzade Halil Pasha (1724–1777) was an Ottoman statesman who served as Grand Vizier in 1769. He was the son of Grand Vizier Ivaz Mehmed Pasha. He was of Albanian origin.

He took part in Russian Wars under the title of serdar-i ekrem (Commander General of the Army).

After he had been excused from military service, he was sequentially appointed to the governorship of the Sanjak of Eğriboz (eastern Central Greece), the Eyalet of Bosnia, the Eyalet of Salonika, and the Eyalet of Sivas.

Political offices
Preceded by Moldovancı Ali Pasha	Grand Vizier of the Ottoman Empire; 13 December 1769 – 25 December 1770	Succeeded by Silahdar Mehmed Pasha
