= Lefkeli Mustafa Pasha =

Grand Vizier of the Ottoman Empire (1622)

Lefkeli Mustafa Pasha (Ottoman Turkish: ليفكيلي مصطفى باشا; died 1648) was an Ottoman statesman from the city of Lefke in Cyprus. He was Grand Vizier of the Ottoman Empire in 1622 and governor of Egypt in 1618.

== See also ==
- List of Ottoman grand viziers
- List of Ottoman governors of Egypt

Political offices
Preceded by Nişancı Ahmed Pasha	Ottoman Governor of Egypt; 1618	Succeeded by Cafer Pasha
Preceded by Mere Hüseyin Pasha	Grand Vizier of the Ottoman Empire; 8 July 1622 – 21 September 1622	Succeeded by Hadım Mehmed Pasha
