= Çelebizade Şerif Hasan Pasha =

Grand Vizier of the Ottoman Empire, 1790-1791

Çelebizade Şerif Hasan Pasha (also known as Seyyid Şerif Hasan Pasha, Rusçuklu Şerif Hasan Pasha, or simply Şerif Hasan Pasha) was an Ottoman grand vizier, 1790-1791.

== Early career ==
Hasan was the son of Çelebi Hacı Süleyman Ağa, from the ayan of Rusçuk. Hasan was serdengeçti ağası (agha of volunteer raiders) in a 1769 raid into Ukraine during the Russian-Ottoman War, earning the rank of kapıcıbaşı. This rank was revoked when he tried to become a member of the ayan and he was sentenced to death. He took refuge with the former Crimean Khan Selim III Giray, who eventually secured a pardon for him. He was then allowed to return to Rusçuk.

Hasan caught the attention of Grand Vizier Muhsinzâde Mehmed Pasha during battles against the Austrians at Yergöğü and Bükreş. With the favor of the grand vizier and of İsmail Pasha, the new serasker of Rusçuk, in 1773, Hasan was given the rank of vizier and made governor of İlbasan, on condition that he recapture the fortress of Yergöğü. He failed in this and was transferred to Özü, where he was also unsuccessful. He seems to have been transferred to Rusçuk at some point and also to Silistre, where he is reported to have defended the city against a Russian attack near the end of 1773.

== Disgrace and exile ==
In 1775, Hasan lost his rank as vizier and spent several years in exile in Gümülcine and Selanik. His wife Fatma Hanım died in 1781 and was buried in Gümülcine.

== Later career ==
With the outbreak of the next Russian-Ottoman War in 1787, Hasan was called back to military command in the Danube region at Misivri and Vidin. He was promoted to liva in 1788, and in July 1789 the sancaks of Niğbolu ve İnebahtı were added to his responsibilities. However, he was dismissed from İnebahtı on December 21, 1789, and from Vidin and Niğbolu five days later.

After the death of grand vizier Cezayirli Hasan Pasha, Şerif Hasan was called to the military headquarters in Şumnu, where he was made serdar-ı ekrem vekili (deputy commander-in-chief) on April 1, 1790. At the recommendation of Şeyhülislam Hamidîzade Mustafa Efendi, the next grand vizier would be chosen by lot. The names of all viziers in Rumelia were written on pieces of paper and placed in the Chamber of the Hırka-i Saadet in Topkapı Palace, where Sultan Selim III drew Hasan's name. After investigation into Hasan and inconclusive prayers for guidance (istihâre), it was decided that since Hasan was from the family of the Prophet (âl-i resûl), his appointment would be appropriate. He was made grand vizier on April 16, 1790. He was also promoted to serdar-ı ekrem (commander in chief). Yergöğü was retaken, and on September 18, 1790 an armistice was reached with Austria. Russia’s attempts at making peace were not accepted, though, because the return of Crimea was considered non-negotiable. Selim ordered continual attacks on Russia. Hasan obeyed reluctantly because he did not trust the army. He was not successful in his Russian campaign, and the Russians quickly captured Kili, Tulça, İsakçı, and İzmail. Hasan blamed the kaptanpaşa, the Tatar Khans, and the "rotten army" for the losses. Hasan, however, had damaged his own position with "arbitrary actions," too much "frankness," and alleged bribery and desertion.

== Death and burial ==
Hasan was shot in his quarters or while being transferred to other quarters in Şumnu in the night of February 12-13, 1791 (or on February 11), by order of Selim III. His severed head was put on public display in Istanbul. He is reported to have been buried in the cemetery of the Aziz Mahmud Hüdâyî lodge in Üsküdar, since he was a member of the lodge's Celvetîyye order. He is also reported to have been buried in Şumnu, next to a small mosque on a hill overlooking the city.

As a Rusçuk notable, Hasan may have engendered some fear that he might rebel against the state, and in fact, his brother Çelebi Mehmed Ağa was killed soon after him.
