= Abaza Siyavuş Pasha I =

Grand Vizier of the Ottoman Empire (1651, 1656)

Abaza Siyavuş Pasha

Grand Vizier of the Ottoman Empire
- In office 5 March 1656 – 25 April 1656
- Monarch: Mehmed IV
- Preceded by: Zurnazen Mustafa Pasha
- Succeeded by: Boynuyaralı Mehmed Pasha
- In office 21 August 1651 – 27 September 1651
- Monarch: Mehmed IV
- Preceded by: Melek Ahmed Pasha
- Succeeded by: Gürcü Mehmed Pasha

Personal details
- Died: 25 April 1656 Istanbul, Ottoman Empire
- Spouse: Safiye Hanimsultan

Abaza Siyavuş Pasha I (died 25 April 1656) was an Ottoman grand vizier (the index I is used to differentiate him from the second and better known Abaza Siyavuş Pasha, who also served as grand vizier, from 1687 to 1688).

He was of Abazin origin and a manservant of Abaza Mehmed, who was a rebel leader of the Ottoman Empire in the 17th century. Upon the execution of his master, he entered the service of the palace in Istanbul. In 1638, he was promoted to be a vizier, and in 1640, he was assigned as the Kapudan Pasha (Admiral of the Navy). In 1642, he was tasked with recapturing the fort of Azov (in modern Russia) from the Cossacks, but failed. He was then assigned to various cities as governor, including Erzurum, Diyarbakır (both in modern Turkey) and Silistra (in modern Bulgaria). On 5 March 1651, he was promoted to be the grand vizier following an uprising of tradesmen in Istanbul. On 27 September, a little more than a month after his appointment, he was dismissed from his post and was about to be executed when Kösem Sultan intervened to save his life. He was appointed as the governor of Bosnia. Although Abaza Siyavuş Pasha was again promoted to the post of grand vizier on 5 March 1656, he died soon afterwards on 25 April.

He was married with Safiye Hanımsultan, daughter of Gevherhan Sultan and granddaughter of Ahmed I.

== See also ==
- List of Ottoman grand viziers
- List of Ottoman governors of Bosnia

Political offices
Preceded by Melek Ahmed Pasha	Grand Vizier of the Ottoman Empire; 21 August 1651 – 27 September 1651	Succeeded by Gürcü Mehmed Pasha
Preceded by Zurnazen Mustafa Pasha	Grand Vizier of the Ottoman Empire; 5 March 1656 – 25 April 1656	Succeeded by Boynuyaralı Mehmed Pasha
