= Şehzade Mustafa =

Şehzade Mustafa may refer to:

- Şehzade Mustafa (son of Mehmed II) (1450–1474), Ottoman prince, son of Mehmed II and Gülşah Hatun
- Şehzade Mustafa (son of Suleiman the Magnificent) (born 1515 or 1516; died 1553), Ottoman prince, son of Suleiman the Magnificent and Hurrem Hatun
