= Şehzade Mehmed Burhaneddin =

Şehzade Mehmed Burhaneddin may refer to:

- Şehzade Mehmed Burhaneddin (son of Abdulmejid I) (1849–1876)
- Şehzade Mehmed Burhaneddin (son of Abdul Hamid II) (1885–1949)
