= Janissary revolt in Tunisia =

Date	August 30, 1811
Location	Tunis and in the Kasba of Tunis
Result	Tunisian victory: dissolution of the Turkish militia in Tunisia

Belligerents
Beylik of Tunis; Supported by: United Kingdom (Note: From 1854) (First French Empire) French Empire	Janissary

Commanders and leaders
Hammuda ibn Ali	Unknown

Strength
Unknown	8,000 Janissaries

Casualties and losses
Unknown	1,200 killed

The Janissary revolt in Tunisia took place on 30 August 1811 and pitted the Janissaries — Turkish militias — against the forces of the Beylik of Tunis.

== Background ==
During the reign of Ali II ibn Hussein, the bey strengthened the Turkish militia in order to match the power of the Odek of Algiers. Upon his death, his son Hammuda ibn Ali succeeded him, and the Turkish militia numbered more than 8,000 Janissaries. As a result, the country lost much of its internal independence to the benefit of the increasingly dominant Turkish militia.

To counterbalance this influence, Hammuda ibn Ali implemented several reforms:

First, he put an end to the recruitment of Janissaries from the Levant. Then, he sidelined most Turkish high officials from political affairs and reduced their influence. Finally, he created a new military corps composed mainly of courghoulis. To ensure compliance with these reforms, he also established a personal guard composed of Mamluks of Georgian and Circassian origin.

== The revolt ==
On 30 August 1811, a revolt broke out in Tunis. The insurgents looted shops and invaded the Jews quarter, where they committed acts of torture. With the complicity of the king's garrison — which was also involved in the plot — the insurgents managed to seize the Kasbah.

However, with the assistance of the consuls of France and Great Britain, who sent three European officers, the loyalist forces were able to dislodge the insurgents. Around 1,200 Janissaries fled toward Djebel Ensareyah, but they were intercepted by Hammuda ibn Ali's army. After a long battle, the loyalist troops defeated the rebels, killing 512 Janissaries and executing the rest.

== Aftermath ==
Following the revolt, Hammuda ibn Ali completely dismantled the Turkish militia and replaced it with a national army. As a result, the Kingdom of Tunis freed itself from direct Ottoman control: it began to issue its own laws, establish its own political constitution, mint its own currency, and maintain an independent merchant navy.

From that point on, the Ottoman Empire was never able to reassert its authority over Tunisia or interfere in its internal governance.
