= Hacı Pasha =

Grand Vizier of the Ottoman Empire from 1348 to 1349

Grand Vizier of the Ottoman Empire
- In office 1348–1349
- Monarch: Orhan
- Preceded by: Nizamüddin Ahmed Pasha
- Succeeded by: Sinanüddin Fakih Yusuf Pasha

Hacı Pasha or Haji Pasha (Ottoman Turkish: حاجي باشا) was an Ottoman statesman. He was grand vizier of the Ottoman Empire from 1348 to 1349. Little else is known about him other than his role as grand vizier.

Political offices
Preceded by Nizamüddin Ahmed Pasha	Grand Vizier of the Ottoman Empire; 1348–1349	Succeeded by Sinanüddin Fakih Yusuf Pasha
