= Çavuşbaşı Memiş Pasha =

Çavuşbaşı Memiş Pasha was an Ottoman Grand Vizier, who served from 16 November 1808 to December 1808. He was of Albanian origin. His honorific name, Çavuşbaşı, means "head sergeant".
