= Sinanüddin Fakih Yusuf Pasha =

Grand Vizier of the Ottoman Empire from 1349 to 1364

Grand Vizier of the Ottoman Empire
- In office 1349 – September 1364
- Monarchs: Orhan; Murad I
- Preceded by: Hacı Pasha
- Succeeded by: Çandarlı Halil Pasha the Elder

Personal details
- Died: September 1364

Sinanüddin Fakih Yusuf Pasha (Ottoman Turkish: سنان الدین فقیہ یوسف پاشا; died September 1364) was an Ottoman statesman. He was fourth grand vizier of the Ottoman Empire from 1349 to 1364. He served as the last grand vizier of Sultan Orhan and the first grand vizier of Sultan Murad I.

A 1360 inscription by sultan Orhan mentions Sinanüddin Fakih Yusuf and notes that he was the son of a man named Muslihuddin Musa and the grandson of a man named Mecdüddin İsa. It is also understood from this inscription that he was an Ahi who served as Ottoman bureaucrats.

After his death (and the end of his term), the former kazasker Çandarlı Halil Pasha the Elder became grand vizier, beginning the "Çandarlı era" of the Ottoman Empire, where the prominent Çandarlı family supplied several generations of grand viziers and held great political power.

== See also ==
- List of Ottoman grand viziers

Political offices
Preceded by Hacı Pasha	Grand Vizier of the Ottoman Empire; 1349–1364	Succeeded by Çandarlı Kara Halil Hayreddin Pasha
