= Boynuyaralı Mehmed Pasha =

Grand Vizier of the Ottoman Empire (1656)

Boynuyaralı / Boynueğri Mehmed Pasha

Grand Vizier of the Ottoman Empire
- In office 26 April 1656 – 15 September 1656
- Monarch: Mehmed IV
- Preceded by: Abaza Siyavuş Pasha I
- Succeeded by: Köprülü Mehmed Pasha

Personal details
- Born: 1576 Samsun
- Died: 1665 (aged 88–89) Eyüp, Istanbul, Ottoman Empire

Military service
- Allegiance: Ottoman Empire
- Battles/wars: Ottoman–Safavid War (1623–39) (WIA)

Boynuyaralı Mehmed Pasha (born:1576 Canik died 1665 in Eyüp, Istanbul), also known as Boynueğri Mehmed Pasha, was an Ottoman statesman. He was grand vizier of the Ottoman Empire from 26 April 1656 to 15 September 1656.

Mehmed Pasha fought in the Ottoman–Safavid War of 1623–39 under sultan Murad IV. He was wounded in the neck during a battle, earning him the epithets boynuyaralı ("wounded-neck" in Turkish) and boynueğri ("crooked-neck"). As a Sergeant General in his youth, he was involved in the execution of the satirist poet Nef'i. Although he was famous for his courage in wars in his youth, he was noted as an unsuccessful grand vizier. He was of Turkish origin.

== See also ==
- List of Ottoman grand viziers

Political offices
Preceded by Abaza Siyavuş Pasha I	Grand Vizier of the Ottoman Empire; 26 April 1656 – 15 September 1656	Succeeded by Köprülü Mehmed Pasha
