= Alaeddin Pasha (vizier) =

First Grand Vizier of the Ottoman Empire from 1320 to 1331

- علاء الدين

Grand Vizier of the Ottoman Empire
- In office 1320–1331
- Monarchs: Osman I Orhan
- Preceded by: Position established
- Succeeded by: Nizamüddin Ahmed Pasha

Personal details
- Born: Cendere, Nallıhan, Turkey

Alaeddin Pasha (Ottoman Turkish: علاء الدين پاشا) was the first Ottoman grand vizier. His father's name was Kemaleddin (Arabic: كمال الدين, lit. 'perfection of the faith'), and thus he was usually called Hacı Kemaleddin oğlu Alaeddin Pasha or Alaeddin bin Hacı Kemaleddin, meaning "son of Hacı Kemaleddin" He was probably from the town of Cendere, from where the famous Çandarlı family also originated. He was a faqih (expert in Islamic law). He was appointed as the vizier during the last years of Osman I's reign (probably in 1320). He continued during Orhan's Bey's reign. Since there was only one vizier in the divan during the early years of the Ottoman beylik, his title was not actually grand vizier, but his post was equivalent to the post of the later grand viziers. Because of this, he is known as the first grand vizier of the Ottoman Empire.

He founded the first standing army for the Ottoman sultan, which would later on become the Janissaries. The new corps wore white caps in contrast to earlier red-cap Turkmen soldiers. Alaeddin's service as grand vizier ended before 1333.

Some sources claim that Alaeddin Pasha was Orhan's brother. Although Orhan had a brother named Alaeddin Pasha, brother Alaeddin and vizier Alaeddin are usually not believed to be the same person.

== See also ==
- List of Ottoman grand viziers

Political offices
New office	Grand Vizier of the Ottoman Empire; 1320–1331	Succeeded by Nizamüddin Ahmed Pasha
