= Nizamüddin Ahmed Pasha =

Grand Vizier of the Ottoman Empire from 1331 to 1348

Mahmudoğlu Nizamüddin Ahmed Pasha

Grand Vizier of the Ottoman Empire
- In office 1331–1348
- Monarch: Orhan
- Preceded by: Alaeddin Pasha
- Succeeded by: Hacı Pasha

Personal details
- Born: Anatolia
- Died: 25 January 1380

Nizamüddin Ahmed Pasha (Ottoman Turkish: محمود اوغلى نظام الدين أحمد پاشا) was an Ottoman statesman. He was grand vizier of the Ottoman Empire from 1331 to 1348.

Political offices
| Preceded by Alaeddin Pasha | Grand Vizier of the Ottoman Empire; 1331–1348 | Succeeded by Hacı Pasha |
