= Damat Hasan Pasha =

Grand Vizier of the Ottoman Empire from 1703 to 1704

Damat Moralı Hasan Pasha

Grand Vizier of the Ottoman Empire
- In office 18 November 1703 – 28 September 1704
- Monarch: Ahmed III
- Preceded by: Kavanoz Ahmed Pasha
- Succeeded by: Kalaylıkoz Hacı Ahmed Pasha

Governor of Egypt
- In office 1687–1689
- Preceded by: Mollacık Hasan Pasha
- Succeeded by: Sarhoş Ahmed Pasha
- In office 1707–1709
- Preceded by: Dellak Ali Pasha
- Succeeded by: Moralı Ibrahim Pasha

Personal details
- Born: c. 1658 Tripoli
- Died: December 1713 (aged 54–55) Urfa, Ottoman Empire
- Spouse: Hatice Sultan (m. 1691)
- Children: Rukiye Ayşe Hanımsultan

Moralı Damat Hasan Pasha (Modern Turkish: Moralı Enişte Hasan Pasha or Moralı Damat Hasan Pasha; c. 1658 – December 1713) was an Ottoman statesman of Greek origin who served as the Grand Vizier of the Ottoman Empire from 1603 to 1604.

== Biography ==
He was born of Greek ancestry in Morea, and was converted to Islam early on at the Enderun School through the Devşirme Christian child tax system. He initially served as an Armourer and rose to the post of Grand Vizier, where he served between 1703 and 1704. On 13 March 1691, he married Hatice Sultan, the daughter of Sultan Mehmed IV and Gülnuş Sultan, They were given the Sinan Pasha Palace as their residence. They had a daughter. He was eventually exiled to Izmit with his wife in 1704. In 1707, Hasan Pasha was sent to Egypt, whereas his wife returned to Istanbul, he was appointed as the governors of Egypt, Tripoli and Kütahya. He died in December 1713 in Şanlıurfa.

== See also ==
- List of Ottoman grand viziers
- List of Ottoman governors of Egypt
- Greek Muslims

== Sources ==
- Sakaoğlu, Necdet (2008). Bu mülkün kadın sultanları: Vâlide sultanlar, hâtunlar, hasekiler, kadınefendiler, sultanefendiler. Oğlak Yayıncılık. ISBN 978-9-753-29623-6.
- Uluçay, Mustafa Çağatay (2011). Padişahların kadınları ve kızları. Ankara, Ötüken.

Political offices
Preceded by Mollacık Hasan Pasha	Ottoman Governor of Egypt; 1687–1689	Succeeded by Sarhoş Ahmed Pasha
Preceded by Kavanoz Ahmed Pasha	Grand Vizier of the Ottoman Empire; 16 November 1703 – 28 September 1704	Succeeded by Kalaylıkoz Hacı Ahmed Pasha
Preceded by Dellak Ali Pasha	Ottoman Governor of Egypt; 1707–1709	Succeeded by Moralı Ibrahim Pasha
