= Hasanpaşa =

Hasanpaşa may refer to:

== Istanbul ==
- Hasanpaşa, Kadıköy, a neighbourhood in Istanbul, Turkey
- Hasanpaşa Gasworks, a former gasworks, redeveloped into a museum, in Istanbul, Turkey
- Hasanpaşa (Istanbul Metro), a metro station in Sultanbeyli, Istanbul, Turkey

== Other ==
- Hasanpaşa, Tefenni, a village in Burdur Province, Turkey
- Hasanpaşa, İnegöl, a village in Bursa Province, Turkey
- Hasan Pasha Han, Diyarbakır, a historical caravanserai in Diyarbakır, Turkey

== See also ==
- Hasan Pasha (disambiguation)
