= Hasan Rami Pasha =

Ottoman admiral and naval minister (1842–1923)

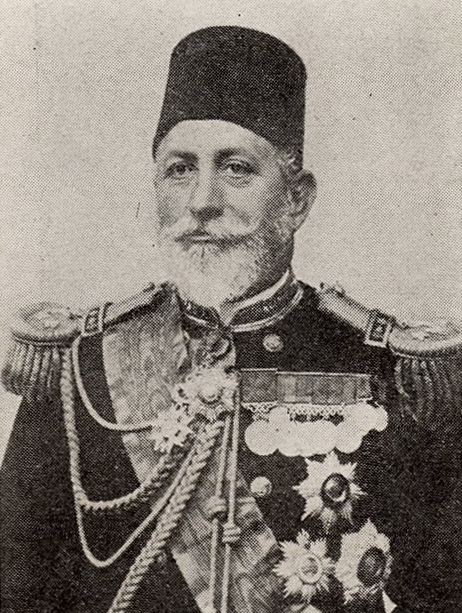
- Born: Hasan Rami; 1842; Selanik, Salonica Eyalet, Ottoman Empire
- Died: 1923 (aged 80–81); Istanbul, Turkey
- Military career
- Allegiance: Ottoman Empire
- Branch: Ottoman Navy
- Rank: Admiral
- Conflicts: Greco-Turkish War (1897)

Hasan Rami Pasha (1842–1923) was an Ottoman admiral and naval minister during the reign of Abdul Hamid II, who later also participated in the Greco-Turkish War (1897).

== Life ==
He was born in Selanik (Thessaloniki, now in Greece) to a Turkish family in 1842. In 1856, after graduating from the naval academy he was appointed as a navy officer. During the Russo-Turkish War (1877-1878) he was a commander of a warship. In 1882, he was appointed as the commander of the navy. Three years later, he became the adjutant of sultan Abdul Hamid II, a prestigious but inactive post. In 1897, at the eve of the Greco-Turkish War (1897) he was tasked with defending the Dardanelles. In 1906, he was appointed as the naval minister. Two years later however, following the Young Turk Revolution he was dismissed by the now powerful Committee of Union and Progress partisans. He was put on trial and was downgraded. He spent his last years in Istanbul and died in 1923.

== Problems in the navy ==
Abdülaziz, the sultan before 1876, tried to form a powerful navy. In the mid 19th century, the Ottoman Navy was one of the most powerful navies in the world. But Abdul Hamid II never allowed any naval activity. After the Russo-Turkish War, for about 20 years, the navy had no training, maneuver or maintenance. All warships stayed in the Golden Horn without the slightest training. According to one view, Abdul Hamid was afraid of navy officers' possible coup d'état. But before the war against Greece, Abdul Hamid decided to send the Ottoman Navy to Dardanelles Strait as a precaution against a possible Greek naval offensive. (Greek navy was smaller but more up-to-date and superior than that of the Ottoman Empire). Hasan Rami who was the commander of this navy soon found out that almost all ships and most of the weapons needed major repairs. Although Hasan Rami Pasha was able to sail up to the Dardanelles with difficulty, he saw that the navy was almost out of commission. He prepared a report and suggested to purchase new warships instead of repairing the old ships. He further pointed out that the former reports to the sultan about the navy were false.

== Rauf Bey’s critics ==
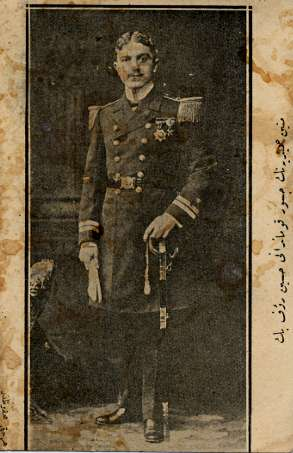
Rauf Orbay

Rauf Bey (future prime minister and one of the leaders in the early days of the Turkish War of Independence) was one of the subordinates of Hasan Rami Pasha. According to his memoirs, his expectations were high in Hasan Pasha's reform projects. But he was disappointed when Hasan Pasha was appointed as the naval minister. Because unlike his former self, Hasan Pasha became a passive politician and did nothing to reform the navy. After the Young Turk Revolution he was accused for the miserable condition of the navy.

== Hasan Rami Pasha’s memoirs ==
Later Hasan Rami Pasha published his memoirs to be acquitted. In 2013 his memoirs, together with Rauf Bey's critics was republished by Osman Öndeş, a retired naval officer and an editor.

Political offices
Preceded by Mehmet Celalettin Pasha	Minister of the Navy; 1906–1907	Succeeded by Ibrahim Halil Pasha
