= Mere Hüseyin Pasha =

Grand Vizier of the Ottoman Empire (died 1624)

Grand Vizier of the Ottoman Empire
- In office 5 February 1623 – 30 August 1623
- Monarch: Mustafa I
- Preceded by: Hadım Mehmed Pasha
- Succeeded by: Kemankeş Kara Ali Pasha
- In office 13 June 1622 – 8 July 1622
- Monarch: Mustafa I
- Preceded by: Kara Davud Pasha
- Succeeded by: Lefkeli Mustafa Pasha

Ottoman Governor of Egypt
- In office July 1620 – April 1622
- Preceded by: Hamidi Mustafa Pasha
- Succeeded by: Biber Mehmed Pasha

Personal details
- Died: July 1624 Constantinople, Ottoman Empire
- Ethnicity: Albanian

Mere Hüseyin Pasha (died July 1624) was an Ottoman statesman of Albanian origin. He was two times Grand Vizier of the Ottoman Empire in 1622 and 1623, and previously the Ottoman governor of Egypt between 1620 and 1622. His epithet "Mere!" comes from the word for "Take it!" in Albanian; he was nicknamed so because of the many times he ordered his men to "take [the heads]" of his opponents, i.e. execute them. He was purportedly the only grand vizier who did not speak Ottoman Turkish or Osmanlica.

== Life ==
Hüseyin Pasha was an Albanian from the region of İpek, in present-day Kosovo. He may have been a progenitor of the Begolli family. It is purported that he never learned to speak Turkish, a very rare occurrence in the Turkish-controlled Ottoman Empire.

He began his government career as the aşcıbaşı (chief cook) of Satırcı Mehmed Pasha, soon becoming a member of the sipahi corps. He then took on a series of increasingly high level government posts, until July 1620, when he was appointed the governor of Egypt Eyalet and made a vizier.

As the governor of Egypt, Hüseyin Pasha's manners were described as "rough and unpolished." He was ill for the first few months of his term, but when he recovered, he threw a feast for his children and received many gifts, although he sent most of the gifts given to him by the wealthy back. While he was governor, the flooding of the Nile caused widespread drought in Egypt, leading to his dismissal from the office in March or April 1622. His defterdar (finance minister) Hasan, having become the acting governor (kaymakam) after Hüseyin Pasha's removal, accused him of having embezzled money from the treasury and crops from the granary and prevented him from leaving Cairo. Hüseyin Pasha paid 25,000 gold pieces (dinars; half of the claimed amount) and claimed that a local, who had disparaged him after his removal from office, should pay the rest, claiming that the Money Lender was indebted to Hüseyin Pasha in the same amount, with this obtaining permission to leave. However, when the authorities went to the Money Lender to demand payment of the money that Hüseyin Pasha had said he owed him, the Lender claimed that he had already paid Hüseyin Pasha. When this response was made known to Hüseyin Pasha, he claimed that he was not at fault and the Lender was lying, but agreed to pay the remaining 25,000 gold pieces in exchange for the Lender being brought to him. The acting governor accepted this proposal and delivered the Lender to Hüseyin Pasha, who tortured and killed him and took the 25,000 gold pieces by force. After these events, Hüseyin Pasha traveled to Romania Rumelia, not to be confused with modern-day Romania.

A few months later, on June 13, 1622, Hüseyin Pasha was appointed grand vizier for the first time, serving for less than a month until July 8, 1622, under sultan Mustafa I. The next year, the sultan appointed him grand vizier once more, from February 5, 1623, to August 30, 1623.

== See also ==
- List of Ottoman grand viziers
- List of Ottoman governors of Egypt

Political offices
Preceded by Hamidi Mustafa Pasha	Ottoman Governor of Egypt; July 1620 – April 1622	Succeeded by Biber Mehmed Pasha
Preceded by Kara Davud Pasha	Grand Vizier of the Ottoman Empire; 13 June 1622 – 8 July 1622	Succeeded by Lefkeli Mustafa Pasha
Preceded by Hadım Mehmed Pasha	Grand Vizier of the Ottoman Empire; 5 February 1623 – 30 August 1623	Succeeded by Kemankeş Kara Ali Pasha
