= Mollacık Hasan Pasha =

Hasan Pasha (also referred to as Mollacık (the Little Mullah) Hasan Pasha or Kethüda (the Chamberlain) Hasan Pasha; died 1700/1701) was an Ottoman statesman who served as the Ottoman governor of Egypt Eyalet (1687), Baghdad Eyalet (1687–1688, 1690–1691/92), and Shahrizor Eyalet (1591/92–1595/96). He also served as the warden of the Ottoman Sanjak of Rhodes and was a vizier.

While he was the warden of Rhodes, Hasan Pasha retired. In 1697 or 1698, his viziership was revoked, and he was exiled first to the Sanjak of Kocaeli and then to Saqqez. His viziership and warden post was restored in 1698 or 1699. He died in 1700 or 1701.

== See also ==
- List of Ottoman governors of Egypt

Political offices
Preceded by Hamza Pasha	Ottoman Governor of Egypt; 1687	Succeeded by Damat Hasan Pasha
