= Gürcü Mehmed Pasha =

Grand Vizier of the Ottoman Empire from 1651 to 1652

Gürcü Hadım Mehmed Pasha
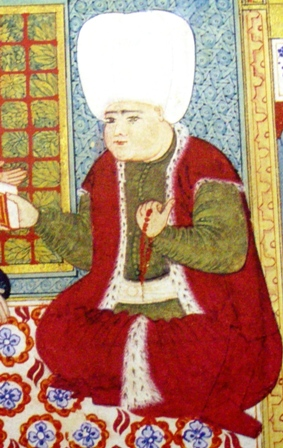

Grand Vizier of the Ottoman Empire
- In office 27 September 1651 – 20 June 1652
- Monarch: Mehmet IV
- Preceded by: Abaza Siyavuş Pasha I
- Succeeded by: Tarhoncu Ahmed Pasha

Personal details
- Died: 1665 Buda, Ottoman Hungary
- Spouse: Atike Sultan (m. 1665)
- Origins: Georgian

Gürcü Mehmed Pasha (died 1665, Buda) was an Ottoman statesman. He was grand vizier of the Ottoman Empire between 27 September 1651 and 20 June 1652.

He was the former slave of Koca Sinan Pasha, a previous, prominent grand vizier.

== See also ==
- List of Ottoman grand viziers

Political offices
Preceded by Abaza Siyavuş Pasha I	Grand Vizier of the Ottoman Empire; 27 September 1651 – 20 June 1652	Succeeded by Tarhoncu Ahmed Pasha
