= Benderli Ali Pasha =

Grand Vizier of the Ottoman Empire (1821)

Grand Vizier of the Ottoman Empire
- In office 23 March 1821 – 30 April 1821
- Monarch: Mahmud II
- Preceded by: Seyyid Ali Pasha
- Succeeded by: Hacı Salih Pasha

Personal details
- Died: 1821 Cyprus, Eyalet of the Archipelago, Ottoman Empire

Benderli Ali Pasha was an Ottoman statesman. He was Grand Vizier of the Ottoman Empire.

He ruled from 23 March 1821 to 30 April 1821 as grand vizier of Sultan Mahmud II He came to Constantinople on 21 April 1821 and was actually only nine days in power.

He was the last grand vizier clearly executed upon a clear order by a Sultan (Mahmud II).

According to Ottoman biography textbook called Sicill-i Osmani, on 12 April 1821 he was diminished by Sultan Mahmud and was sent to exile in Rhodes, where he died later. Controversially according to Ottoman annals by royal historian Vak'a-nüvis Ahmet Cevdet Efendi (textbook called Tarih-i Cevdet), he was sent in exile to Cyprus and after his departure royal executioners were sent to the island. He was interred at Karacaahmet Cemetery in the Üsküdar district of Istanbul.

== Sources ==
Preceded by Seyyid Ali Pasha	Grand Vizier; 23 March 1821 – 30 April 1821	Succeeded by Hacı Salih Pasha
