= Tarhoncu Ahmed Pasha =

Grand Vizier of the Ottoman Empire from 1652 to 1653

Tarhoncu Ahmed Pasha (Turkish: Tarhuncu Ahmed Paşa; born 1592 - died 21 March 1653) was an Ottoman Albanian statesman and Grand Vizier of the Ottoman Empire from 20 June 1652 to 21 March 1653, when he was executed because of the economic reforms he initiated.

Tarhoncu Ahmed Pasha was born in the area of modern Mat District, northern Albania in the late 16th century. He was initially a tarragon salesman (tarhoncu) before joining the Ottoman administration. He served as the Governor of Egypt before attaining the vezirate. During his brief tenure in the middle of the reign of Sultan Mehmet IV (r. 1648–1687), he attempted to forestall the decline and reform the Ottoman bureaucracy. Tarhoncu Ahmed was the first grand vizier to draft an annual budget in advance of the coming fiscal year. However, his reforms threatened the conservative forces in the Ottoman elite, who secured his execution on 21 March 1653 by spreading the false rumour that he intended to depose the sultan. This effectively ended the attempts at reform for several years.

== See also ==
- List of Ottoman grand viziers
- List of Ottoman governors of Egypt

Political offices
Preceded by Mostarlı Mustafa Pasha	Ottoman Governor of Egypt; 1648–1651	Succeeded by Hadım Abdurrahman Pasha
Preceded by Gürcü Mehmed Pasha	Grand Vizier of the Ottoman Empire; 20 June 1652 – 21 March 1653	Succeeded by Koca Dervish Mehmed Pasha
