= Deli Abdullah Pasha =

Grand Vizier of the Ottoman Empire from late 1822 to early 1823

Deli Abdullah Pasha or Abdullah Hamdullah Pasha was an Ottoman leader who served as grand vizier between November 1822 and March 1823 during the reign of Mahmud II.

Abdullah served as bostancıbaşı (head of security) from 1809 to 1815. He was appointed kapudan pasha (grand admiral) in July 1819, but resigned in November 1821. During his time as kapudan pasha, he signed an order (buyuruldu) in 1820 resolving issues with the French purchase of the Venus de Milo. At some point, he was also governor of the sancak of Karahisar-ı Sahib and the muhafız (guard) of the Anatolian coast of the Bosporus.

Abdullah was appointed grand vizier on November 10 or 11, 1822, and tasked with finding and removing supporters of the formerly influential Halet Efendi from imperial service. He was also ordered to have Halet executed. After Abdullah completed these tasks, he was removed as grand vizier on March 30, 1823. The reason given was that he had failed to bring the Janissaries under control.
