= Hadım Mehmed Pasha =

Grand Vizier of the Ottoman Empire from 1622 to 1623

Hadım Mehmed Pasha (Ottoman Turkish: خادم محمد باشا) was a Georgian Ottoman statesman. He was Grand Vizier of the Ottoman Empire between 21 September 1622 and 5 February 1623. He also served as the Ottoman governor of Egypt from 1604 to 1605.

== See also ==
- List of Ottoman grand viziers
- List of Ottoman governors of Egypt

Political offices
Preceded by Maktul Hacı Ibrahim Pasha	Ottoman Governor of Egypt; 1604–1605	Succeeded by Yemenli Hasan Pasha
Preceded by Lefkeli Mustafa Pasha	Grand Vizier of the Ottoman Empire; 21 September 1622 – 5 February 1623	Succeeded by Mere Hüseyin Pasha
