= Ottoman Disaster =

1621–1622 coup d'état and regicide

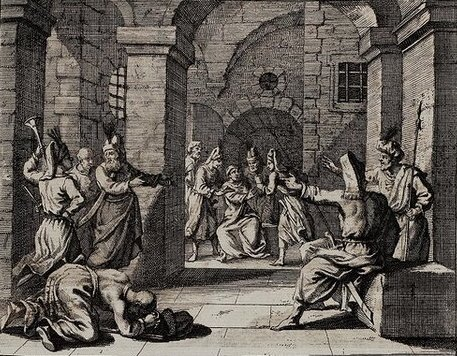
The murder in a 1694 German-language book on the Ottomans.

The Ottoman Disaster (Haile-i Osmaniye or Osmanlı Faciası) was the murder of Sultan Osman II on 20 May 1622 by a janissary unit. As a result the Abaza rebellions broke out all over the Empire.

== Course of events ==
During the Battle of Hotin in 1621, the janissaries' reluctance to fight angered Osman, who decided the abolish the corps. He was talked out of going to suppress the rebellion in Anatolia by the Sheikh al-Islam Hocazade Esad Efendi, who argued it was too small to merit the sultan going in person. His main purpose in doing so had been to raise an army in Anatolia. He later tried to raise an army under the pretext of going on hajj, but was prevented again. The janissaries learned of this, and asked the Sultan to execute Hoca Ömer Efendi, Süleyman Ağa and others, and rebelled when he refused to do so.

Some sources state that the sultan accepted his arrest and others that he was abducted by force. His hands were tied, he was mounted on a donkey, crowds insulted and attacked him, and he was locked him in a cell at the dungeons of Yedikule Fortress. One day Grand Vizier Kara Davud Pasha ordered nine or ten executioners into the cell, where the sultan attacked them until Cebecibaşı (known as Kalender Uğrusu) held onto his legs and executed him with a noose round his neck.

The rebels had declared Mustafa I sultan, but he eventually issued a hatt-i humayun ordering that the murderers be hunted down. They started to hide, with Davud Pasha found a year later hiding in a haystack. On 8 January Kalender Uğrusu, Vizier Derviş Pasha and others involved in the murder were executed.

== Legacy ==
The janissaries continued to interfere in state affairs long after the murder. Future sultans would not interfere with the Janissaries, though they never dared murder another sultan. This status quo continued until Mahmud II's reign.

== Bibliography ==
- (in Turkish) Bir Osmanlı Trajedisi | 1. Basım - Gabriel Piterburg (2018)
