= Bostanji =

Imperial guards of the Ottoman Empire

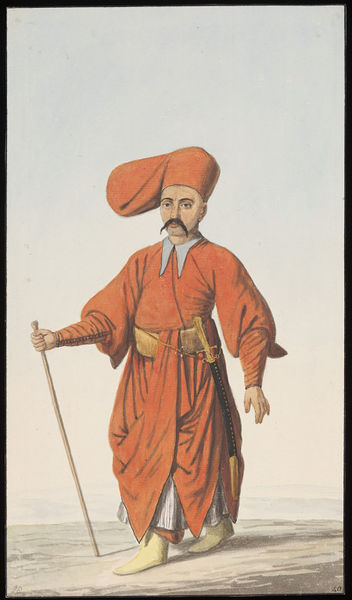
A guard of the bostanji corps

A bostanji (also spelled bostandji or bostangi; from Turkish: bostancı, literally "gardener") was a member of a type of imperial guards of the Ottoman Empire. The bostanji were mainly responsible for protecting the sultan's palace. They also guarded the seraglio and rowed the sultan's barge. Their chief was called the bostanji-bashi (Turkish: bostancıbaşı), and he had the rank of a pasha. The bostanji at one time numbered 3000, and were united with the janissaries, another Ottoman imperial guard corps, in military duty. In wartime their strength was 12,000. By the beginning of the 20th century, their number was about 600.

== See also ==
- Topkapı Palace
