= Karamani Mehmed Pasha =

Grand Vizier of the Ottoman Empire from 1477 to 1481

Karamani Mehmet Pasha

Grand Vizier of the Ottoman Empire
- In office 1477–1481
- Monarch: Mehmet II
- Preceded by: Gedik Ahmed Pasha
- Succeeded by: Ishak Pasha

Personal details
- Born: Konya, Ottoman Empire
- Died: 4 May 1481 Istanbul, Ottoman Empire

Karamani Mehmet Pasha (died 4 May 1481) was an Ottoman statesman who served as grand vizier from 1477 to 1481.

== Early years ==
Karamani was born in Konya and was a descendant of Rumi. He traveled to Constantinople (present day Istanbul) to study in the medrese founded by Mahmud Pasha Angelovic. Later on, he worked as a teacher in the medrese. Being a man of letters, in various occasions he acted as a consultant to the sultan. He was appointed as the court calligrapher (nisanci, Turkish: nişancı) and he contributed to the kanunname of Mehmed II, a series of laws regularising the Ottoman Empire. He also helped the sultan in writing letters of high literary value to Aq Qoyunlu sultan Uzun Hasan.

== As a grand vizier ==
After conquering Constantinople and the execution of grand vizier Çandarlı Halil Pasha, Mehmed II had preferred to appoint grand viziers of devshirme origin instead of Ethnic Turks to avoid possible crises caused by over-powerful grand viziers. After executing his last Turkish grand vizier, his next four grand viziers were of devsirme origin. Karamani Mehmet's appointment as grand vizier in 1476, therefore marks a notable exception, for he was a Turk from the recently conquered Karamanid territory in Anatolia. In his short term in the office, Karamani Mehmet tried to reform the Ottoman administration.

== Death of Mehmed II and Karamani Mehmet ==
In 1481, Mehmed II died. In the Ottoman Empire, it was the duty of the grand viziers to delay the announcement of a sultan's death before the claimant to throne arrived in the capital, in order to avoid chaos. However, in this case, the sultan's sons were far away; Bayezid (later Bayezid II) was in Amasya and Cem Sultan was in Karaman, Karamani Mehmet's home town. Karamani Mehmet sent messengers to both princes, but as Karaman was nearer to the capital, Cem had a better chance to reach it before his elder brother. Nevertheless, the Janissaries who were supporting Bayezid learned about the sultan's death and they further suspected that Karamani Mehmet was backing Cem. They revolted and killed Karamani Mehmet a few days after the death of the sultan.

== See also ==
- List of Ottoman grand viziers

== Bibliography ==
- Küçükdağ, Yusuf (2001). "Karamânî Mehmed Paşa". TDV Encyclopedia of Islam, Vol. 24 (Kāânî-i Şîrâzî – Kastamonu) (in Turkish). Istanbul: Presidency of Religious Affairs, Centre for Islamic Studies. pp. 449–451. ISBN 978-975-389-451-7.

Political offices
Preceded by Gedik Ahmed Pasha	Grand Vizier of the Ottoman Empire; 1476–1481	Succeeded by Ishak Pasha
