= Ahmed Esad Pasha =

Grand Vizier of the Ottoman Empire (1873, 1875)

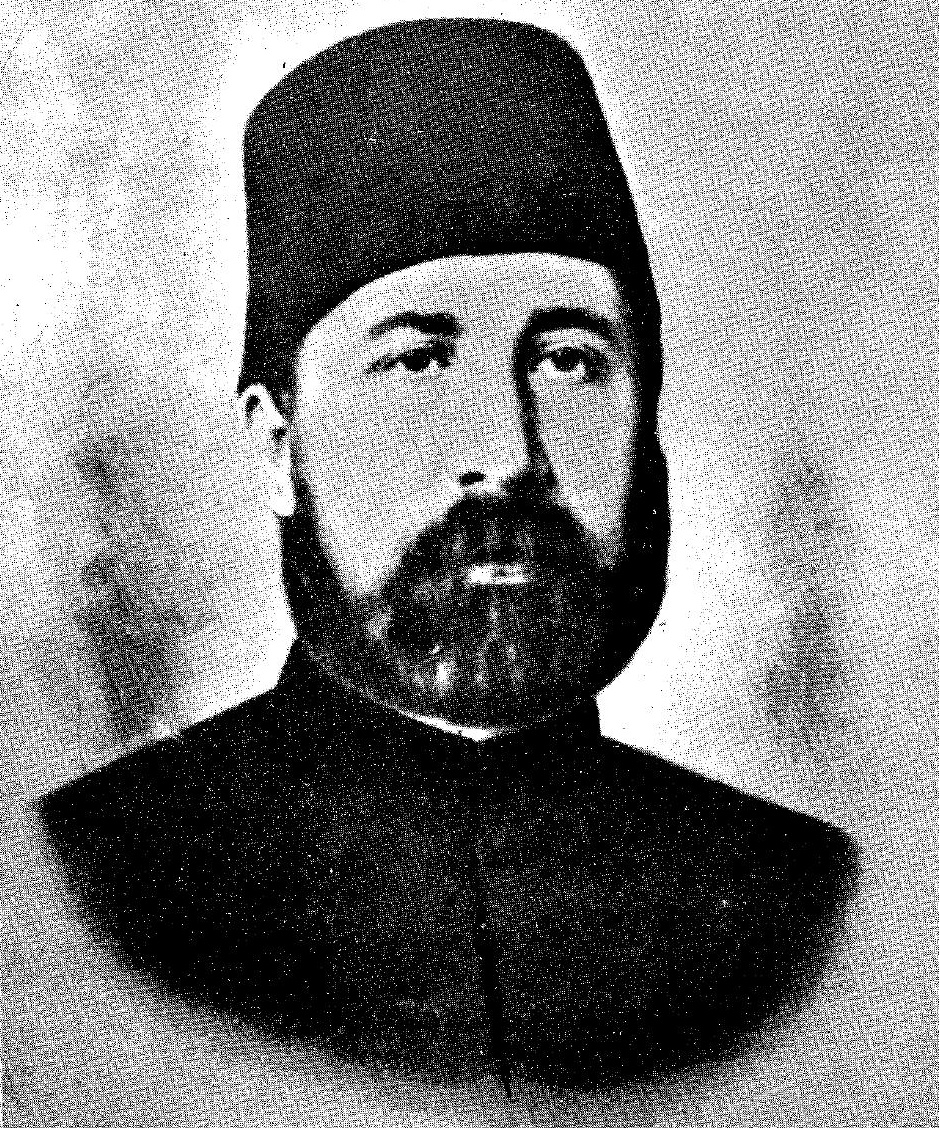
Portrait of Ahmed Esad Pasha

Ahmed Esad Pasha (Turkish: Sakızlı Ahmet Esat Paşa, 1828 in Chios – 1875 in Smyrna) was an Ottoman conservative statesman. He was Grand Vizier of the Ottoman Empire during two terms in 1873 and 1875.
