= Kalaylıkoz Haji Ahmed Pasha =

Grand Vizier of the Ottoman Empire in 1704

Kalaylıkoz Haji Ahmed Pasha was an Ottoman statesman who served as Grand Vizier for two months and twenty-seven days, and as governor and guard of many provinces, between 28 September 1704 and 25 December 1704, during the reign of Ahmed III.

== Life ==
Of Greek origin. Kalaylıköz Ahmet Pasha became Grand Vizier on September 28, 1704. He was allegedly dismissed on December 21, 1704, according to the Limni Treaty. He became the Guard of Chania in 1705/06, the Guard of Lepanto in July 1706, and retired in December 1706. He was appointed governor of Heraklion in August 1710, of Lepanto in 1713, and of Trabzon for a second time in 1714. He died in December of the same year.

== Sources ==
- Danışmend, İsmail Hami, (1971) Osmanlı Devlet Erkâni, İstanbul: Türkiye Yayınevi, p;51 ( in Turkish )
- Mehmed Süreyya / Sicill-i Osmanî (part. I, p. 237/38, 1996).
