= Kara Davud Pasha =

Grand Vizier of the Ottoman Empire (1622)

Damat Kara Davud Pasha
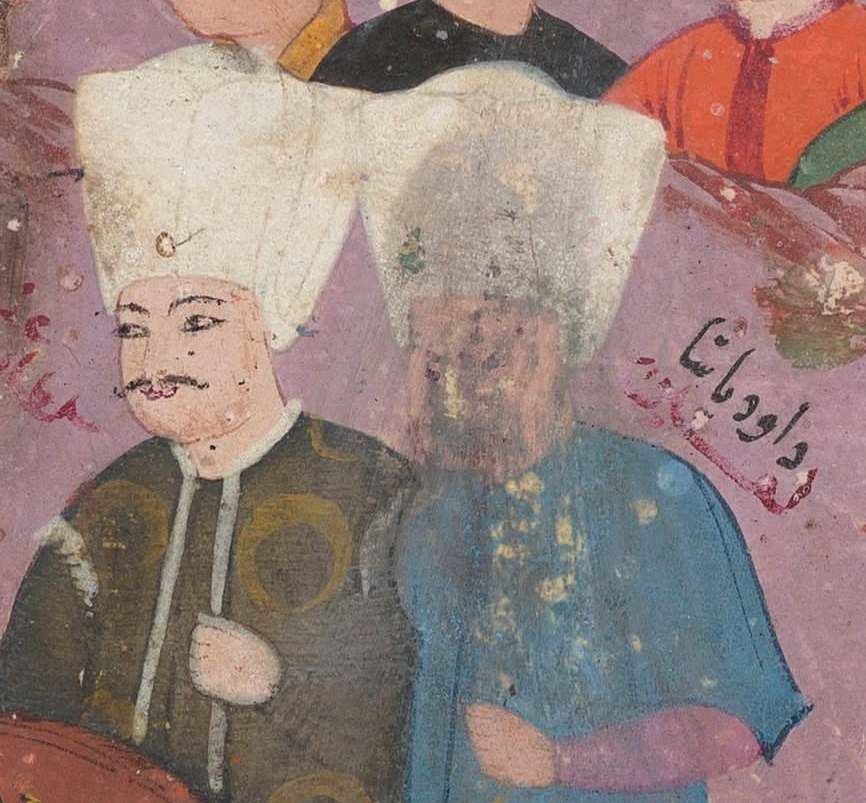
- Osman II (left) and Davud Pasha (right), c. 1620–1622

Grand Vizier of the Ottoman Empire
- In office 20 May 1622 – 13 June 1622
- Monarch: Mustafa I Osman II
- Preceded by: Dilaver Pasha
- Succeeded by: Mere Hüseyin Pasha (first tenure)

Kapudan Pasha
- In office 1617–1618
- Monarch: Mustafa I

Personal details
- Born: c. 1570 Bosnia Eyalet
- Died: 18 January 1623 (aged 52–53) Constantinople, Ottoman Empire
- Resting place: Murat Pasha Mosque, Aksaray
- Spouse(s): Fülane Sultan, a daughter of Sultan Mehmed III and Halime Sultan (m. 1604)
- Children: Sultanzade Süleyman Bey a daughter

Kara Davud Pasha (c. 1570 – 18 January 1623) also known as simply Davud Pasha (Ottoman Turkish: داود باشا) or as Hain Davud Pasha ("Davud Pasha the Traitor"), was an Ottoman statesman who became briefly Grand Vizier of the Ottoman Empire in 1622, during the reign of his brother-in-law Mustafa I.

== Career ==
His first position was of Kethüda under Mehmed III (1595–1603) then he was named Kapıcıbaşı under Ahmed I (r. 1603–1617). He became Kapudan Pasha for a brief time during the first reign of Mustafa I (1617–1618). He was appointed Beylerbey of Rumelia and shortly afterwards vizier.

He was appointed to position of Grand Vizier on 20 May 1622, through the influence of Halime Sultan, Mustafa's mother and his own mother-in-law.

He carried out the execution of Osman II, cutting off his ear as proof to give to Halime that Osman was dead. He was dismissed on 13 June 1622, and executed on 18 January 1623. He was buried in Murat Pasha Mosque, Aksaray.

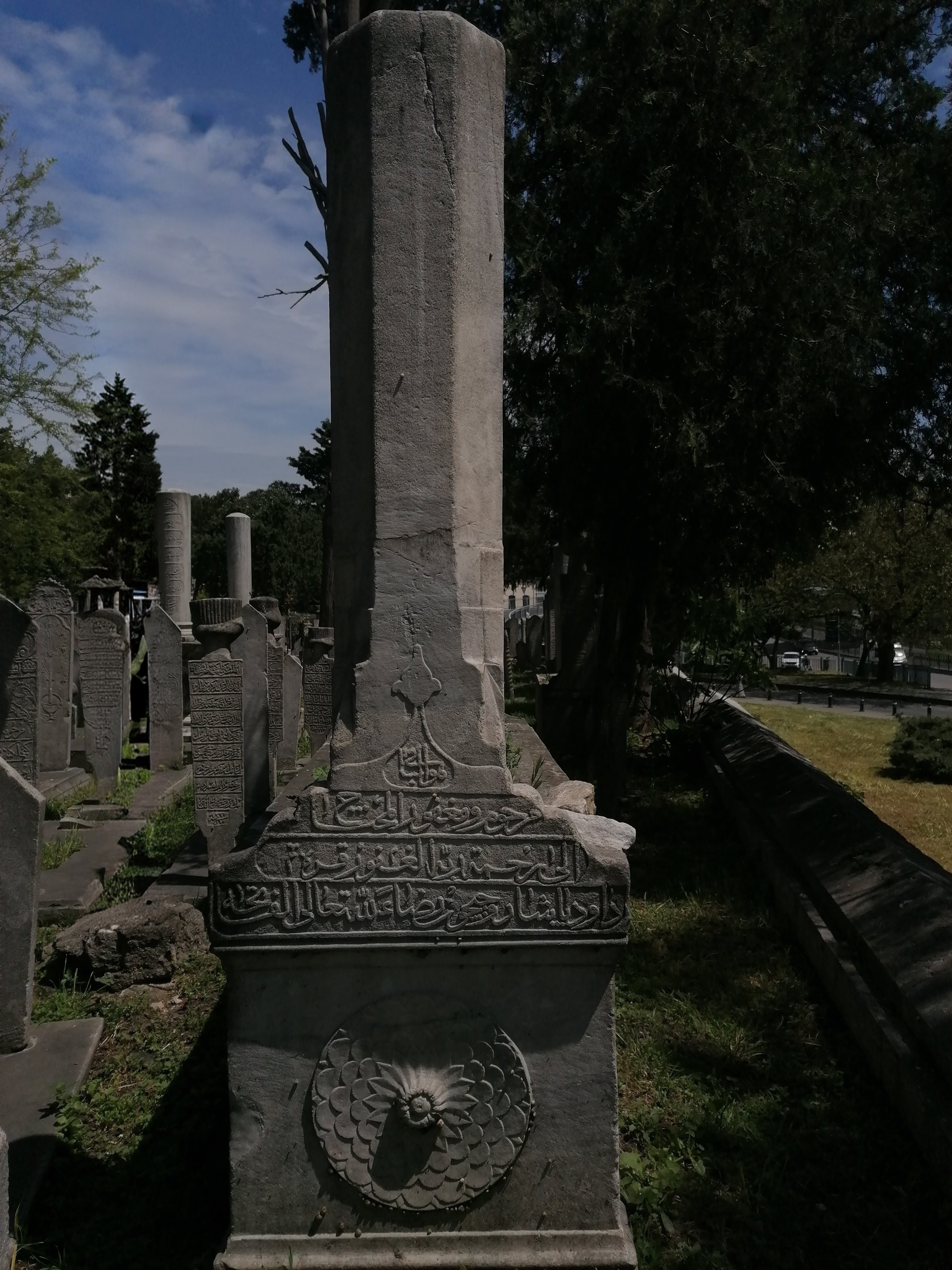
Tombstone of Kara Davud Pasha located in the Murat Paşa Mosque cemetery in Aksaray Istanbul

== Family ==
He married a daughter of Mehmed III and Halime Hatun, in 1604 (consummated in March 1606). The couple had two children, a son named Sultanzade Süleyman Bey and a daughter.

== In popular culture ==
- In the 2015 Turkish television series Muhteşem Yüzyıl: Kösem, Davud was portrayed by Turkish actor Mustafa Üstündağ. His wife was portrayed by Melisa Ilayda Ozcanik (young role) and Öykü Karayel (adult role) under the name Dilruba Sultan, because when the series was shot, the names of Mehmed's daughters were not known.

Political offices
Preceded by Dilaver Pasha	Grand Vizier of the Ottoman Empire; 20 May 1622 – 13 June 1622	Succeeded by Mere Hüseyin Pasha
