= Handan Sultan =

Valide Sultan of the Ottoman Empire from 1603 to 1605

- Valide Sultan

Valide Sultan of the Ottoman Empire
- Tenure: 22 December 1603 – 9 November 1605
- Predecessor: Safiye Sultan
- Successor: Halime Sultan
- Born: c. 1570; Sanjak of Bosnia, Rumelia, Ottoman Empire
- Died: 9 November 1605 (aged 34–35); Topkapı Palace, Constantinople, Ottoman Empire
- Burial: Mehmed III Mausoleum, Hagia Sophia, Istanbul
- Consort of: Mehmed III (died 1603)
- Issue: Fatma Sultan; Şehzade Selim; Şehzade Süleyman; Ayşe Sultan; Şah Sultan; Ahmed I
- House: House of Osman (by marriage)
- Religion: Sunni Islam (converted)

Handan Sultan (Ottoman Turkish: خندان سلطان; c. 1570 – 9 November 1605) was a consort of Ottoman sultan Mehmed III. As the mother of Ahmed I, she served as valide sultan and de facto regent from 1603 until her death in 1605. She was a politically influential woman during her tenure, and is remembered as one of the prominent figures during the era known as the Sultanate of Women, living in the Ottoman Empire as a courtier during the reigns of three sultans: Murad III, Mehmed III and Ahmed I.

After entering the Ottoman Imperial Harem—probably in 1583—she became one of the two known consorts of then-Prince Mehmed; she succeeded in having her third son, Ahmed, named heir to the throne after her husband's accession as Sultan Mehmed III in 1595, through an alliance with her mother-in-law Safiye Sultan. Initially overshadowed by her mother-in-law and kept away from politics, she acquired power and influence after Mehmed III's death in 1603, and the ascension of her son, now Sultan Ahmed I.

As the mother of the new sultan, she firstly banished Safiye and all her allies, then acted as the first recognized de facto regent of the Ottoman Empire, taking active positions in politics, affairs of state, power and influence. One of her merits would have been the abolition of the law of fratricide during her son's reign, and having created an effective and capable government apparatus. She died in 1605, having served as the Valide Sultan only for two years.

== Early life ==
According to the Venetian bailo Francesco Contarini, Handan was of Bosnian origin.

=== At the Ottoman Imperial court ===
She was an enslaved servant in the household of Cerrah Mehmed Pasha, the Beylerbey of the Rumelia Eyalet, and his wife Gevherhan Sultan, daughter of Sultan Selim II, sister of Sultan Murad III, and aunt of Sultan Mehmed III. Mehmed Pasha was a surgeon ("cerrah") and had circumcised Şehzade Mehmed in 1582.

In 1583, Prince Mehmed (later Sultan Mehmed III), was appointed the sancak-bey of Saruhan, and as a parting gift, Mehmed Pasha and Gevherhan Sultan, decided to gift Handan, on account of her beauty, into his harem as concubine, in an effort to solidify their political alliance. Handan became one of Mehmed's esteemed concubines in Manisa having possibly given birth to two sons, other than Ahmed I, Prince Selim and Prince Süleyman, and two daughters Handan had an ally in Raziye Hatun, a harem staff member who had helped her to became Mehmed's favorite.

When Mehmed ascended the throne after his father's death in 1595, Handan, as well as the rest of the harem, came with him. An epidemic ravaged the capital between 1597 and 1598, killing Handan's eldest son, Prince Selim. Then another illness killed her second son, Prince Süleyman, in 1602. In addition to mourning, Handan had to deal with the fact that it was no longer her son the eldest (and so the heir) Prince, but the son of her rival Halime, Şehzade Mahmud. Handan would do anything to keep her only remained son, Şehzade Ahmed, alive, so she allied herself with Safiye Sultan, even if she and Safiye didn't really like each other. Within the final years of Mehmed's sultanate, the rivalry between Safiye and Handan, against Halime, continued to increase into a fierce competition.

In the end, Mehmed, under pressure from Safiye Sultan, executed Prince Mahmud, in 1603, making Şehzade Ahmed the heir and Handan his Baş Hatun. According to Bailo Contarini, Handan Sultan supported Safiye's efforts to have Prince Mahmud killed.

While one of the consorts of the Sultan, she never had power over the harem, nor over Sultan Mehmed III himself. Safiye Sultan managed to keep influence and power away from her daughter-in-law. She was, however, described as a gentle, modest, and good hearted woman.

== As Valide Sultan ==
=== Ahmed's accession ===
When Ahmed ascended the throne following Mehmed III's death on 22 December 1603, Handan became the Valide Sultan. As the mother of the new sultan, she received 1,000 aspers a day. On Friday 9 January 1604, the former Valide Sultan Safiye Sultan, along with Şehzade Mustafa (future Mustafa I), were sent to live in the Eski (old) Palace located at the Beyazıt Square. Soon after his succession, Ahmed wanted to express his gratitude to Mehmed Pasha and Gevherhan Sultan for the role they had played in bringing his parents together. By then, however, Cerrah Mehmed Pasha was old and ailing, and died on 9 January 1604. Ahmed, therefore, honored the late pasha's wife. He also named one of his daughters after her.

=== Political influence and Regency ===
Unlike other Valide Sultans, Handan Sultan gathered her family members in the Imperial palace and the capital. She took her sisters into the harem and her brother, Geysudar Mustafa, entered the dervish lodge of Mahmud Hüdayi.

Handan Sultan acted as a de facto regent for her son from 1603 till her death in 1605, along with Mustafa Efendi, the royal tutor: she was the first Valide to act as such (even if unofficially), although it has always been mistakenly reported that the first Valide to act as a ruler was Kösem Sultan. The administrative level formed by Handan Sultan carried out an effective policy in the first years of her son's reign. She was the most influential person in the first two years of Ahmed I's reign and she always attended meetings of government and personally met with her trustees to discuss and decide on the state, and as Venetian bailo Bon reported in late 1604, her influence over the Sultan, the power and the protection she had over him increased as she made decisions on his behalf.

As the Valide Sultan, Handan protected the life of Şehzade Mustafa (second son of her ancient rival Halime), who was mentally ill, and the decision whether or not to kill him because of the law of fratricide was continually postponed by Handan: in November 1604, Şehzade Osman, first son of Ahmed I, was born, definitively dropping out his possible killing. In any case, Handan convinced her son to spare Mustafa's life. According to Godfrey Goodwin - who based himself on a report by Venetian representative in Instabul Ottavio Bon - the Valide Sultan brought down the law of fratricide during her son's reign. As a sign of Handan's presence for Mustafa is the fact that he was seen with her in 1604 at least one time, spending time together, and because she never plotted to have him killed: she cared about him, besides being not her son.

As a co-regent, she immediately began building up her network of clients, and was actively involved in the running of dynastic and imperial affairs together with Ahmed's tutor Mustafa Efendi (died 1607 or 1608). Ahmed several times announced his eagerness to go to war. It seems that Handan Sultan and Mustafa Efendi advised him to behave in this manner in order to give the public the impression that he was capable of ruling the state. He also began to spend a great deal of time outside the palace, notably hunting or conducting incognito inspections, regardless of the weather. Handan Sultan quickly realized that her son could easily put himself in danger and thus needed to be closely watched, and consequently, she ordered his servants to control and supervise him when she couldn't.

She favored her fellow Bosnians at her son's court. She convinced Ahmed to appoint Yavuz Ali Pasha as grand vizier, and maintained a close relationship with him, especially during the first critical months of Ahmed's reign. In spring of 1604, she and Mustafa Efendi ordered Ali Pasha to take command in Hungary. In August 1604, Ahmed ordered the execution of deputy grand vizier Kasim Pasha, and in January 1605 of his successor Sarıkçı Mustafa Pasha, and in both cases his decision was approved and encouraged by Handan Sultan and Mustafa Efendi, who were trying to rid the court of clients of Safiye Sultan.

Because of Handan Sultan's influence on her son, Dervish Mehmed Agha replaced Bayran Agha as chief gardener in summer of 1604. Whenever Handan, Ahmed, and Derviş gathered in the palace gardens, she made Ahmed promise that he will not do anything contrary to Derviş's words and thoughts. Thanks to Handan's continuous support, he managed to become the first royal favorite of Ahmed.

Handan Sultan also acted as an intermediary between her son and other government officials. Any vizier who wanted to communicate with Ahmed had to submit his petition first to her. The contemporary historian Ibrahim Peçevi questioned her wisdom, but legitimized her authority over her son by an old and popular saying "a mother's right is God's right".

=== Charities and public works ===
Handan Sultan made an endowment for the maintenance of her husband Mehmed III's tomb and the salaries of its employees. She also made endowments in Kütahya, Menemen and Kilizman. Between 1606 and 1607, after her death, most of the income of the foundation she founded continued to be transferred regularly.

At the Imperial Palace, Handan had rooms built for the dwarf court servants, to whom she was attached. Also for them, she had houses and a real village built just for them, to ensure their well-being.

=== Illness ===
Sinanpaşaoğlu Mehmed Pasha, who had been married to Piyale Pasha and Gevherhan Sultan's daughter Hatice Hanımsultan in November 1598, was sent to quell the Jelali rebellions in Anatolia. However, he proved to be ineffective, and conducted himself so inappropriately as to arouse suspicions that he had turned a rebel himself. With Handan's intervention, he was forgiven by the sultan. He returned to Istanbul, and took up his duties as vezir. However, he was executed on 20 August 1605. Handan, who was already ill at that time, was so shocked by the turn of events that her condition reportedly worsened.

== Death and aftermath ==
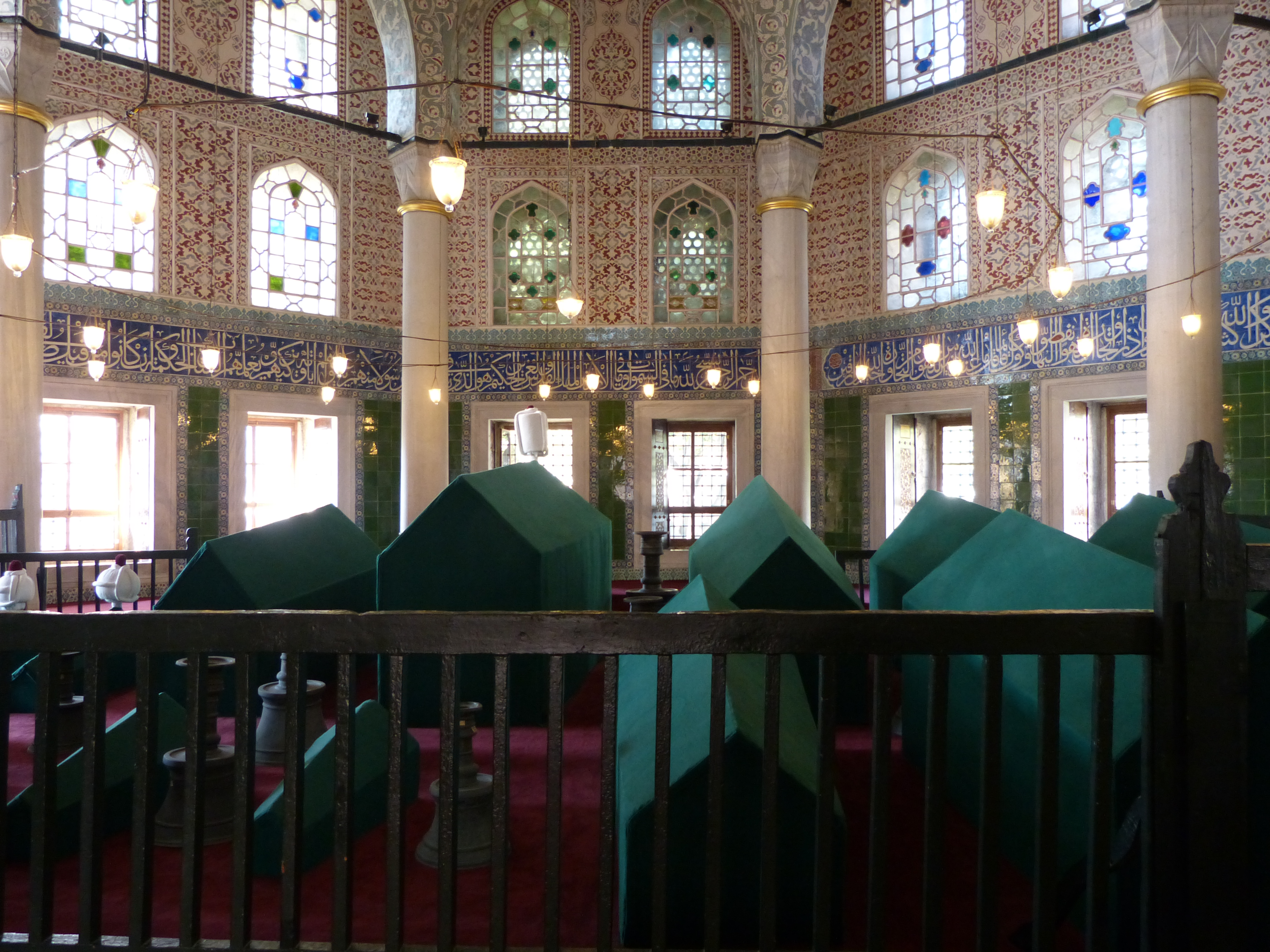
Tomb of Handan Sultan in Mehmed III's mausoleum

Handan Sultan died at the Topkapı Palace on Wednesday, 9 November 1605 after a long illness, possibly a stomach disease.

At her funeral, large amounts of food and alms were distributed for the sake of her soul. She was buried next to her consort in his mausoleum in Hagia Sophia Mosque, Istanbul. Ahmed despite appeals of the viziers for the customary mourning for seven days, didn't postpone his departure from Istanbul on campaign against the Jelali revolts. After Handan's death, Haci Mustafa Agha the chief black eunuch became highest authority in the harem.

== Issue ==
According to the Venetian ambassador Leonardo Donà, Mehmed had five children (whose names he didn't state) with Handan, three sons and two daughters.

- Fatma Sultan (c. 1584, Manisa Palace, Manisa – after 1621, Constantinople?), she married firstly in 1600 to Mahmud Pasha, sanjakbey of Cairo. She married Tiryaki Hasan Pasha in 1604 and had a son and two daughters. When Hasan died in 1611, she remarried Güzelce Ali Pasha in 1616, until his death in 1621.
- Şehzade Selim (1585, Manisa Palace, Manisa – 20 April 1597, Topkapı Palace, Constantinople, buried in Hagia Sophia Mosque);
- Şehzade Süleyman (1586, Manisa Palace, Manisa – 1597, Topkapı Palace, Constantinople, buried in Hagia Sophia Mosque);
- Ayşe Sultan (c. 1587, Manisa Palace, Manisa – after 1614, Constantinople?), married to Destari Mustafa Pasha, with whom she had a son and two daughters who died young. Some sources also suggest that she remarried Gazi Hüsrev Pasha. She was buried in Destari's türbe (Şehzade Mosque) with their children.
- Şah Sultan (c. 1588, Manisa Palace, Manisa – c. 1618, Constantinople?), also called Şahıhuban Sultan; she was married firstly to Damat Mirahur Mustafa Pasha in 1604, with whom she had children; she was widowed in 1610 and remarried Mahmud Pasha in February 1612. She was described as the most beloved sister of her younger brother Ahmed I.
- Ahmed I (18 April 1590, Manisa Palace, Manisa – 22 November 1617, Topkapı Palace, Constantinople, buried in Ahmed I Mausoleum, Sultan Ahmed Mosque);

== In popular culture ==
- In the 2010 film Mahpeyker: Kösem Sultan, Handan is played by Turkish actress Ayten Soykök.
- In the 2015 TV series Muhteşem Yüzyıl: Kösem, Handan is played by Turkish actress Tülin Özen.

== See also ==
- Ottoman dynasty
- Ottoman family tree
- List of Valide Sultans
- List of consorts of the Ottoman Sultans

== Sources ==
- Ágoston, Gábor; Masters, Bruce Alan (21 May 2010). Encyclopedia of the Ottoman Empire. Infobase Publishing. ISBN 9781438110257.
- Alderson, Anthony Dolphin (1956). The Structure of the Ottoman Dynasty.
- Börekçi, Günhan (2010a). "s.v. Ahmed I". In Ágoston Gábor, Bruce Alan Masters (ed.). Encyclopedia of the Ottoman Empire. Infobase Publishing. ISBN 978-1-438-11025-7.
- Börekçi, Günhan (2010b). Factions And Favorites At The Courts of Sultan Ahmed I (r. 1603-17) And His Immediate Predecessors.
- Börekçi, Günhan (2009). İnkırâzın Eşiğinde Bir Hanedan: III. Mehmed, I. Ahmed, I. Mustafa ve 17. Yüzyıl Osmanlı Siyasî Krizi – A Dynasty at the Threshold of Extinction: Mehmed III, Ahmed I, Mustafa I and the 17th-Century Ottoman Political Crisis.
- Günhan Börekçi (June 2009). "İnkırâzın Eşiğinde Bir Hanedan: III. Mehmed, I. Ahmed, I. Mustafa ve 17. Yüzyıl Osmanlı Siyasî Krizi". Divan: Disiplinlerarası Çalışmalar Dergisi (PDF) (in Turkish) (26): 45–96.
- Börekçi, Günhan (2020). "A Queen-Mother at Work: On Handan Sultan and Her Regency During the Early Reign of Ahmed I". The Journal of Southeastern European Studies (34): 45–92. doi:10.26650/gaad.20213403. S2CID 236832964.
- Graf, Tobias P. (23 February 2017). The Sultan's Renegades: Christian-European Converts to Islam and the Making of the Ottoman Elite, 1575-1610. Oxford University Press. ISBN 978-0-198-79143-0.
- Haskan, Mehmed Nermi (2001). Yüzyıllar Boyunca Üsküdar, Volume 1. Üsküdar Belediyesi. ISBN 978-9-759-76063-2.
- Ipşırlı, Mehmet (June 1976). Mustafa Selaniki's history of the Ottomans.
- Peirce, Leslie P. (1993). The Imperial Harem: Women and Sovereignty in the Ottoman Empire. Oxford University Press. ISBN 978-0-195-08677-5.
- Sakaoğlu, Necdet (2008). Bu Mülkün Kadın Sultanları: Vâlide Sultanlar, Hâtunlar, Hasekiler, Kandınefendiler, Sultanefendiler (in Turkish). Oğlak Yayıncılık. ISBN 978-6-051-71079-2.
- Shaw, Stanford J.; Shaw, Ezel Kural (29 October 1976). History of the Ottoman Empire and Modern Turkey: Volume 1, Empire of the Gazis: The Rise and Decline of the Ottoman Empire 1280-1808. Cambridge University Press. pp. 186. ISBN 978-0-521-29163-7.
- Tezcan, Baki (2001). Searching For Osman: A Reassessment of The Deposition of Ottoman Sultan Osman II (1618-1622). (unpublished PhD thesis)
- Tezcan, Baki (2008). "The Debut of Kösem Sultan's Political Career". Turcica. 40 (40): 347–359. doi:10.2143/TURC.40.0.2037143.
- Uluçay, Mustafa Çağatay (2011). Padişahların kadınları ve kızları. Ankara, Ötüken.

Ottoman royalty
| Preceded by Safiye Sultan | Valide Sultan; 22 December 1603 – 26 November 1605 | Succeeded by Halime Sultan |
