= Mehmed III =

Sultan of the Ottoman Empire from 1595 to 1603

- Custodian of the Two Holy Mosques
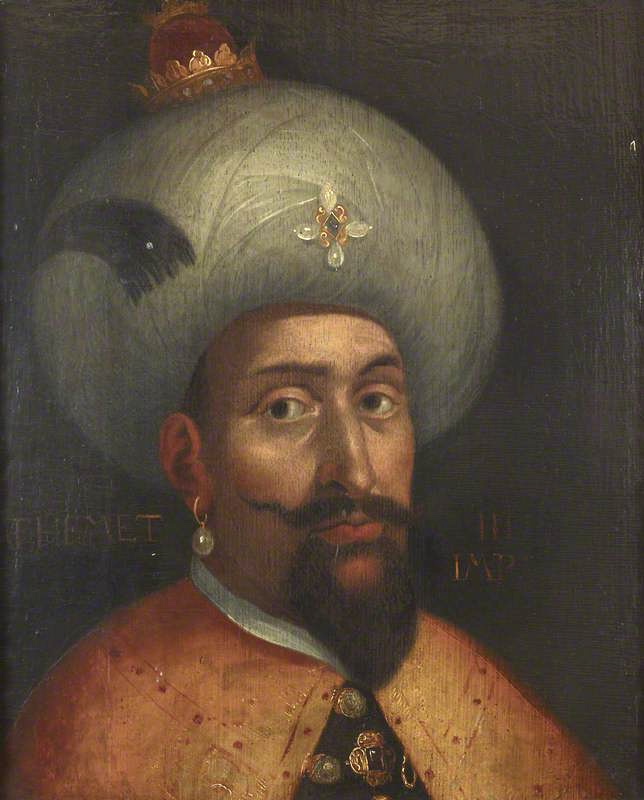
- An important contemporary Western depiction of Ottoman Sultan Mehmed III is an oil-on-panel portrait by Italian Renaissance artist Cristofano dell'Altissimo, part of the Giovio Series commissioned by Duke Cosimo I de' Medici. A notable copy of this 44 cm by 36.5 cm portrait, inscribed with Mehemet III imp, is housed in the National Trust collection at Anglesey Abbey in the United Kingdom.

Sultan of the Ottoman Empire (Padishah)
- Reign: 16 January 1595 – 22 December 1603
- Predecessor: Murad III
- Successor: Ahmed I

Ottoman caliph (Amir al-Mu'minin)
- Predecessor: Murad III
- Successor: Ahmed I
- Born: 26 May 1566; Manisa Palace, Manisa, Ottoman Empire
- Died: 22 December 1603 (aged 37); Topkapı Palace, Constantinople, Ottoman Empire
- Burial: Hagia Sophia, Istanbul
- Consorts: Handan Hatun; Halime Hatun; Fülane Hatun
- Issue Among others: Şehzade Mahmud; Ahmed I Mustafa I
Names
- Mehmed bin Murad
- Dynasty: Ottoman
- Father: Murad III
- Mother: Safiye Sultan
- Religion: Sunni Islam
- Tughra

Mehmed III (Ottoman Turkish: محمد ثالث, Meḥmed-i sālis; Turkish: III. Mehmed; 26 May 1566 – 22 December 1603) was the sultan of the Ottoman Empire from 1595 until his death in 1603.

Mehmed was known for ordering the execution of his brothers and leading the army in the Long Turkish War, during which the Ottoman army was victorious at the Battle of Keresztes. This victory was however undermined by some military losses such as in Győr and Nikopol. He also ordered the successful quelling of the Jelali rebellions. The sultan also communicated with the court of Elizabeth I on the grounds of stronger commercial relations and in the hopes of England allying with the Ottomans against the Spanish.

== Early life ==
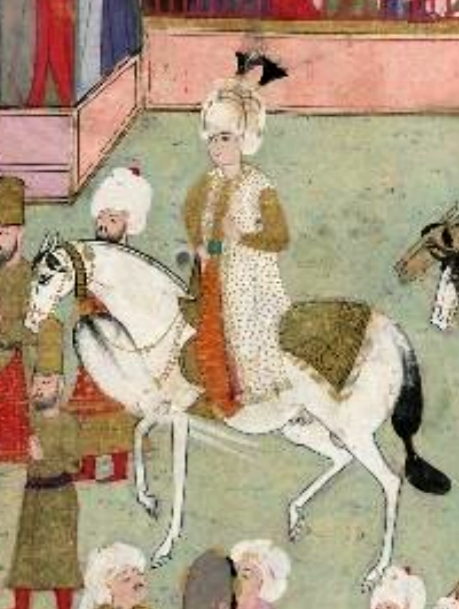
Prince Mehmet arriving from the Old Palace in 1581-83. Sehinsahname' 1592 (TSMK, B.200).

Mehmed was born at the Manisa Palace on 26 May 1566 to Şehzade Murad and his concubine Safiye, an Albanian from the Dukagjin Highlands. He was the grandson of Şehzade Selim and his Haseki, Nurbanu Sultan, and the great-grandson of Sultan Suleiman the Magnificent and his Haseki, Hürrem Sultan (d. 1558). At the time of Mehmed's birth, Suleiman was still the reigning sultan of the Ottoman Empire. Upon hearing the news of the birth of his great-grandson, Suleiman gave him the name Mehmed after his own great-grandfather, Mehmed the Conqueror, to honor him.

Suleiman I died later the same year of Mehmed's birth during the Siege of Szigetvár in September 1566, and Mehmed's grandfather, Selim, succeeded him as the new sultan. When Selim II died in December 1574, Mehmed's father, Murad, succeeded him as Murad III. Mehmed was eight years old at the time.

Mehmed spent most of his childhood and adolescence in Manisa, where he was raised with his family and educated by his tutors, including Ibrahim Efendi. His circumcision ceremony took place on 29 May 1582, when he was 16 years old.

Murad III died in January 1595, when Mehmed was 28 years old. Mehmed then succeeded his father as the new sultan.

== Reign ==
=== Fratricide ===
Upon ascending to the throne, Mehmed III ordered that all of his nineteen brothers be executed. They were strangled by his royal executioners, many of whom were deaf, mute or 'half-witted' to ensure absolute loyalty. Fratricidal successions were not unprecedented, as sultans would often have dozens of children with their concubines.

=== Power struggle in Constantinople ===
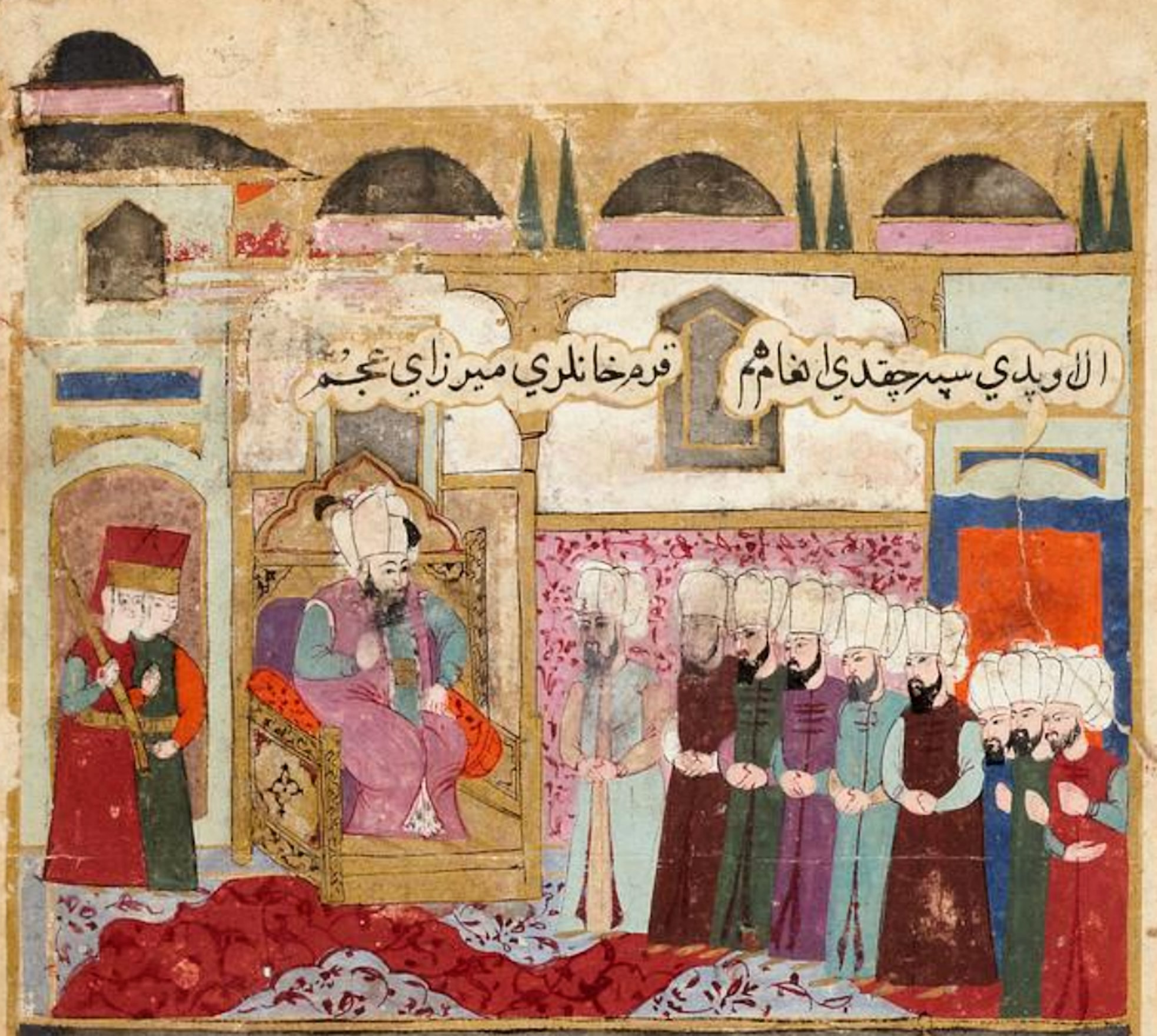
Coronation of Mehmet III in the Topkapi Palace in 1595. Manuscript of 1600 by Seyyid Lokman

Mehmed III was an idle ruler, leaving government to his mother Safiye Sultan, the valide sultan. His first major problem was the rivalry between two of his viziers, Serdar Ferhad Pasha and Koca Sinan Pasha, and their supporters. His mother and her son-in-law Damat Ibrahim Pasha supported Koca Sinan Pasha and prevented Mehmed III from taking control of the issue himself. The issue grew to cause major disturbances by janissaries. On 7 July 1595, Mehmed III finally sacked Serdar Ferhad Pasha from the position of Grand Vizier due to his failure in Wallachia and replaced him with Sinan.

=== Safiye as Valide Sultan ===
When Mehmed III ascended the throne, the real power behind the throne was the Mehmed's mother Safiye Sultan who ruled the Ottoman Empire with her son, exerting as much and sometimes even exceeding the influence and authority as Mehmed III. Safiye was so powerful during the reign of Mehmed III that she was even regarded by the ministers and dignitaries as a co-ruler of the Ottoman Empire.

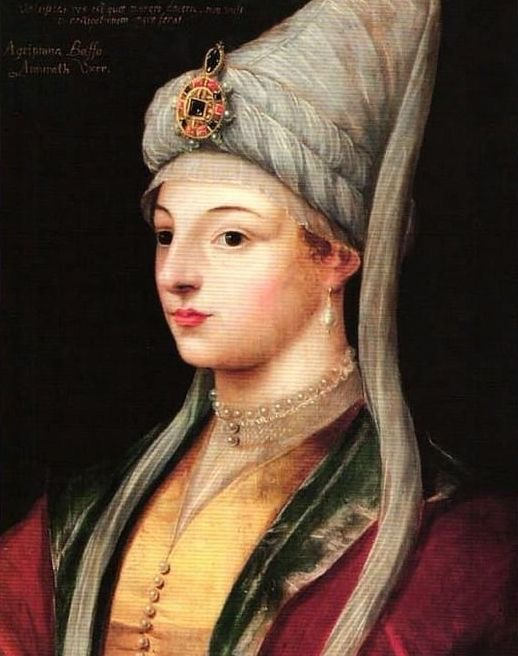
Idealized 18th century portrait of Safiye Sultan, mother of Mehmed III and Valide Sultan of the Ottoman Empire

She headed the Imperial council in the absence of Mehmed, and controlled the appointments and dismissals of Ministers, Grand Viziers and even Sheikh-ul-Islam and she had complete control over the Ottoman Treasury and Finances. She filled the entire Imperial court with her supporters, and therefore didn't experience any sort of protest against her power and influence in the empire, during most of her tenure. If any minister challenged her, they were very unlikely to remain in power for long. As Valide Sultan, her personal purse was three times that of the Sultan, the highest level of salary for a person in the empire. Since the public and officials knew of her active role in state affairs, they would turn to her in order to get their work done, and sometimes they would even block her carriage to make requests in person on such matters. During her son's reign, Mehmed consulted her on important matters and did not make a decision without her consent.

Safiye was also known for her extravagant and lavish lifestyle, which made her many enemies but no one dared to openly challenge her. When Mehmed III went on the Eger campaign in Hungary in 1596, he gave his mother great power over the empire, leaving her in charge of the treasury. During her interim rule she persuaded her son to revoke a political appointment in the judgeship of Constantinople and to reassign the grand vizierate to Damat Ibrahim Pasha, her son-in-law so that no one could do anything in the capital, or even in the whole empire, without Safiye's permission. During the 9-year reign of her son, she was even accused of corruption in his government by selling important and lucrative positions at the highest price offered.

Safiye was instrumental in the execution of her grandson Mahmud in 1603, having intercepted a message sent to his mother by a religious seer, who predicted that Mehmed III would die in six months and be succeeded by his son. According to the English ambassador, Mahmud was distressed at "how his father was altogether led by the old Sultana his Grandmother while the state went to ruin, she respecting nothing but her own desire to get money, and often lamented thereof to his mother," who was "not favored of the Queen mother." The prince was therefore a serious threat to her and her son's reign. The sultan, provoked by her, suspecting a plot and jealous of his son's popularity, had him strangled.

But even for a short period of several weeks in 1600, even the Sultan saw his mother's influence on him and her presence in the palace as disturbing and insisted that she leave the palace and no longer control his affairs. However, she had built extensive support network, and continued to exert a tacit influence over the state through one of the chief eunuchs, appointing her allies to powerful positions. After five weeks, the Sultan was forced to cancel his mother's exile due to the pressure from the Imperial court and she returned to the Palace with even more influence and authority. Safiye continued to co-rule the Empire with him until his death, whereupon she lost all her power and influence and was exiled to Old Palace by her grandson and the new sultan Ahmed I.

=== Austro-Hungarian War ===
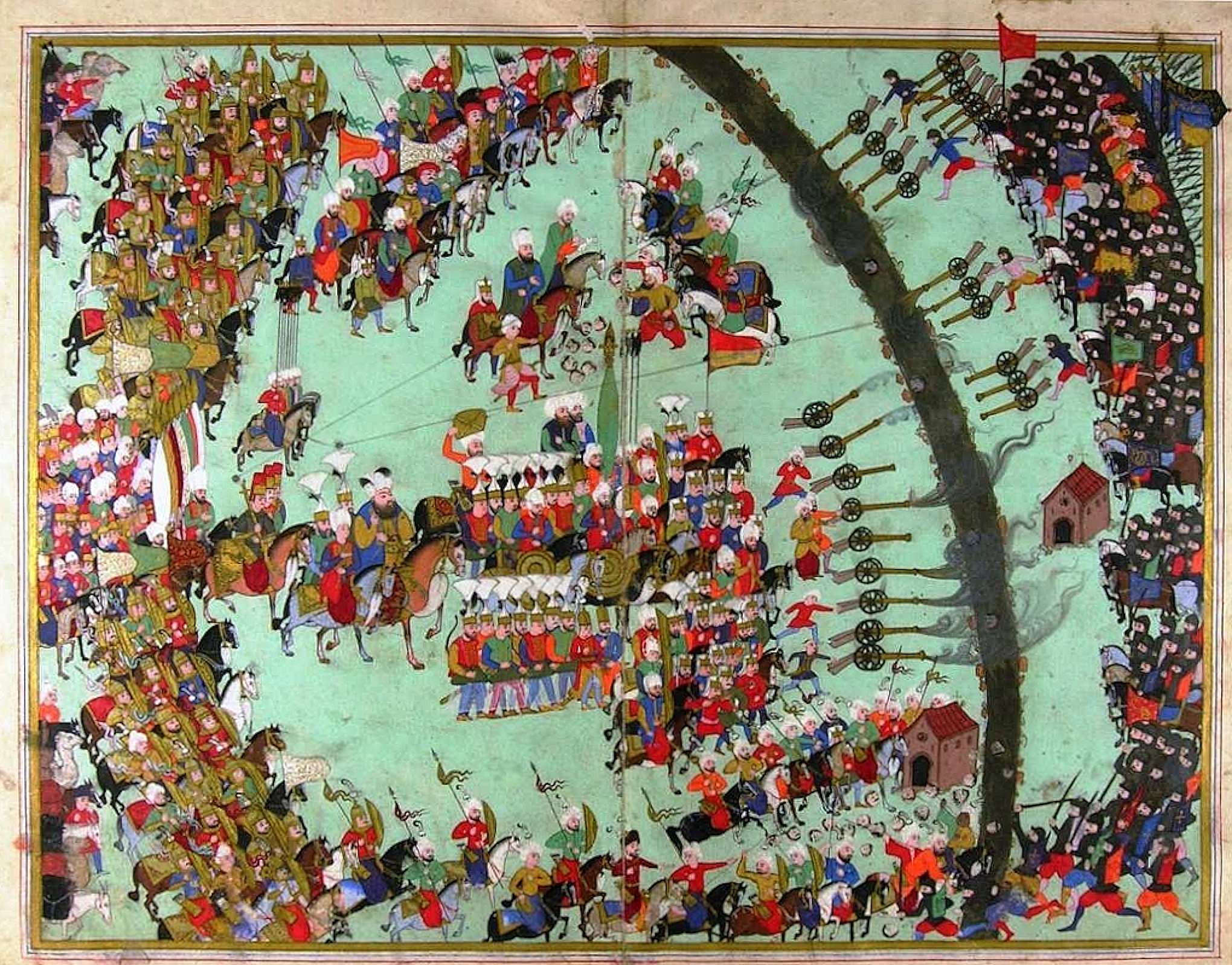
Mehmed III leading his troops at the Battle of Haçova (1596). Eğri Fetihnamesi, 1598 (TSMK, H.1609)

The major event of his reign was the Austro-Ottoman War in Hungary (1593–1606). Ottoman defeats in the war caused Mehmed III to take personal command of the army, the first sultan to do so since Suleiman I in 1566. Accompanied by the Sultan, the Ottomans conquered Eger in 1596. Upon hearing of the Habsburg army's approach, Mehmed wanted to dismiss the army and return to Istanbul. However, the Ottomans eventually decided to face the enemy and defeated the Habsburg and Transylvanian forces at the Battle of Keresztes (known in Ottoman Turkish as the Battle of Haçova), during which the Sultan had to be dissuaded from fleeing the field halfway through the battle. Upon returning to Istanbul in victory, Mehmed told his viziers that he would campaign again. The next year the Venetian Bailo in Istanbul noted, "the doctors declared that the Sultan cannot leave for a war on account of his bad health, produced by excesses of eating and drinking".

In reward for his services at the war, Cigalazade Yusuf Sinan Pasha was made Grand Vizier in 1596. However, with pressure from the court and his mother, Mehmed reinstated Damat Ibrahim Pasha to this position shortly afterward.

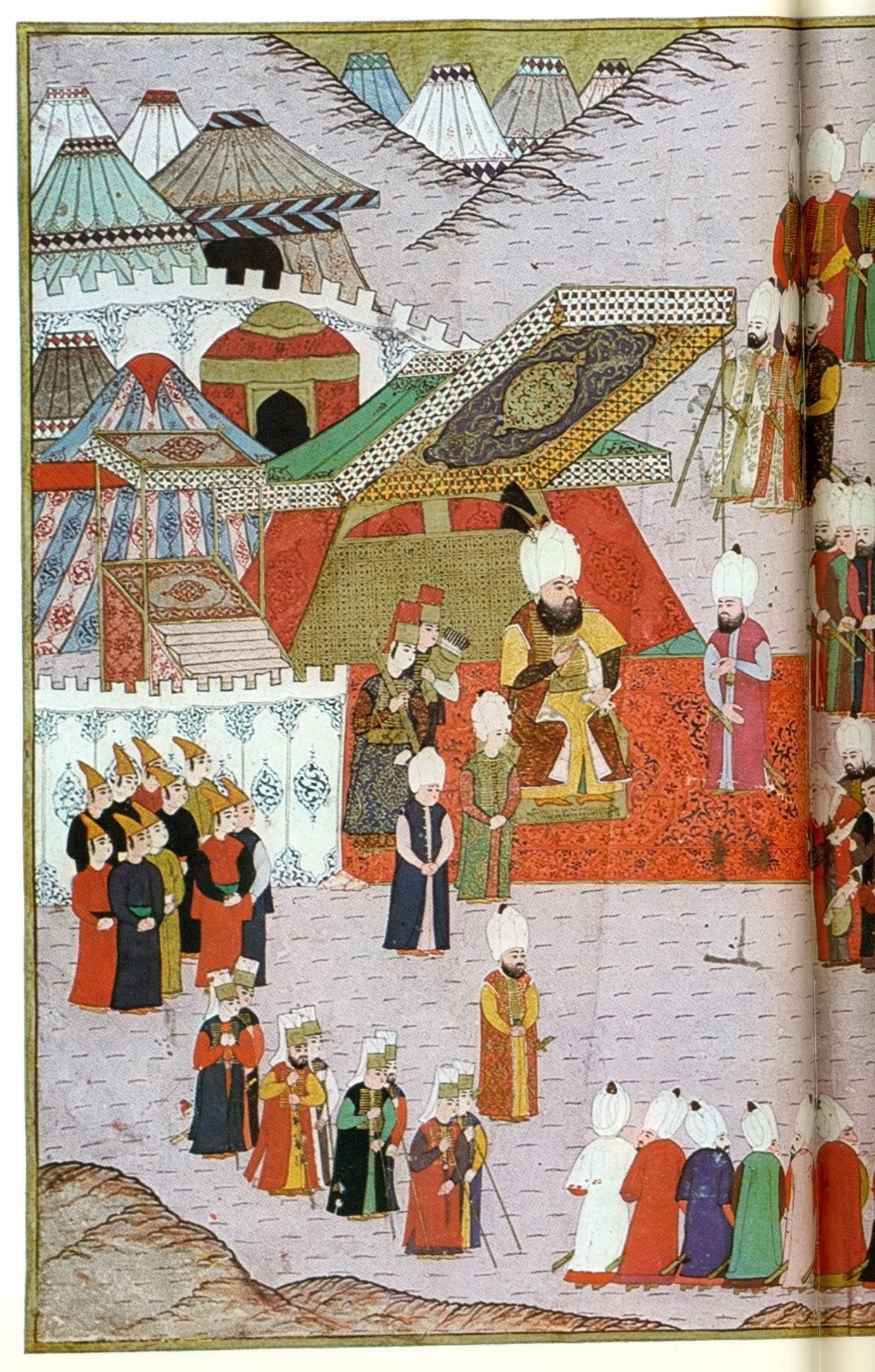
Mehmed III accepting the surrender at Siege of Eger (1596). Eğri Fetihnamesi, 1598 (TSMK, H.1609)

However, the victory at the Battle of Keresztes was soon set back by some important losses, including the loss of Győr (Turkish: Yanıkkale) to the Austrians and the defeat of the Ottoman forces led by Hafız Ahmet Pasha by the Wallachian forces under Michael the Brave in Nikopol in 1599. In 1600, Ottoman forces under Tiryaki Hasan Pasha captured Nagykanizsa after a 40-day siege and later successfully held it against a much greater attacking force in the Siege of Nagykanizsa.

=== Jelali revolts ===
Another major event of his reign was the Jelali revolts in Anatolia. Karayazıcı Abdülhalim, a former Ottoman official, captured the city of Urfa and declared himself a sultan in 1600. The rumors of his claim to the throne spread to Constantinople and Mehmed ordered the rebels to be treated harshly to dispel the rumors, among these, was the execution of Hüseyin Pasha, whom Karayazıcı Abdülhalim styled as Grand Vizier. In 1601, Abdülhalim fled to the vicinity of Samsun after being defeated by the forces under Sokulluzade Hasan Pasha, the governor of Baghdad. However, his brother, Deli Hasan, killed Sokulluzade Hasan Pasha and defeated troops under the command of Hadım Hüsrev Pasha. He then marched on to Kütahya, captured and burned the city.

== Relationship with England ==
In 1599, the fourth year of Mehmed III's reign, the English Queen Elizabeth I sent a convoy of gifts to the Ottoman court. These gifts were originally intended for the sultan's predecessor, Murad III, who had died before they had arrived. Included in these gifts was a large jewel-studded clockwork organ that was assembled on the slope of the Royal Private Garden by a team of engineers including Thomas Dallam. The organ took many weeks to complete and featured dancing sculptures such as a flock of blackbirds that sung and shook their wings at the end of the music. Also among the English gifts was a ceremonial coach, accompanied by a letter from the Queen to Mehmed's mother, Safiye Sultan. These gifts were intended to cement relations between the two countries, building on the trade agreement signed in 1581 that gave English merchants priority in the Ottoman region. Under the looming threat of Spanish military presence, England was eager to secure an alliance with the Ottomans, the two nations together having the capability to divide the power. Elizabeth I's gifts arrived in a large 27-gun merchantman ship that Mehmed personally inspected, a clear display of English maritime strength that would prompt him to build up his fleet over the following years of his reign. The Anglo-Ottoman alliance would never be consummated, however, as relations between the nations grew stagnant due to anti-European sentiments reaped from the worsening Austro-Ottoman War and the deaths of Safiye Sultan's interpreter and the pro-English chief Hasan Pasha.

== Death ==
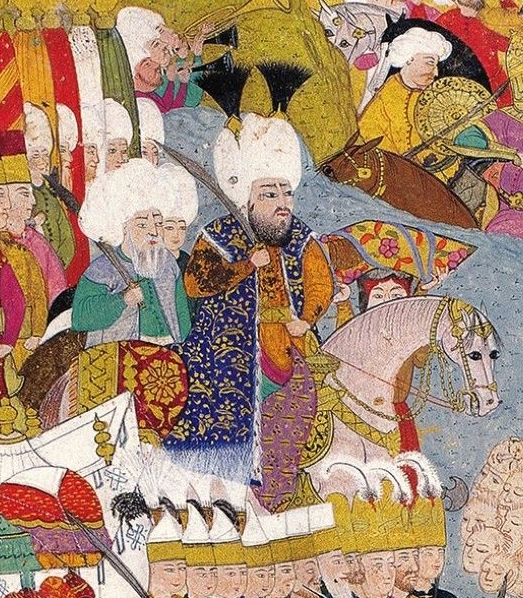
Sultan Mehmet III (detail) at the 1596 Battle of Haçova, north of Erlau in Hungary. Nadiri's Diwan, ca. 1605. TSMK, H.889

Mehmed died on 22 December 1603 at the age of 37. According to one source, the cause of his death was the distress caused by the death of his son, Şehzade Mahmud. According to another source, he died either of a plague or a stroke. He was buried in Hagia Sophia Mosque. He was succeeded by his 13-year-old son Ahmed I as the new sultan of the Ottoman Empire.

== Family ==
=== Consorts ===
Mehmed III had three known consorts, none of whom, according to the harem records, held the title of Haseki sultan:

- Valide Handan Sultan (Bosnia c. 1570 – 9 November 1605, Topkapı Palace, Constantinople; buried in Mehmed III Mausoleum, Hagia Sophia Mosque ). She was the mother and Valide Sultan of Ahmed I.
- Valide Halime Sultan (Abkhazia c. 1570 – after 1623, Old Palace, Constantinople; buried in Mustafa I Mausoleum, Hagia Sophia Mosque, Constantinople). She was his favorite consort and the mother and Valide Sultan of Mustafa I.
- Fülane Hatun (died 1598, Topkapi Palace, Constantinople). She died with her infant son during the outbreak of plague or smallpox.

=== Sons ===
Mehmed III had at least eight sons:

- Şehzade Selim (1585, Manisa Palace, Manisa – 20 April 1597, Topkapı Palace, Constantinople; buried in Hagia Sophia Mosque) – with Handan. He died of scarlet fever.
- Şehzade Süleyman (c. 1586, Manisa Palace, Manisa – 1597, Topkapi Palace, Constantinople; buried in Hagia Sophia Mosque) – with Handan. He died of scarlet fever.
- Şehzade Mahmud (1587, Manisa Palace, Manisa – executed by Mehmed III, 7 June 1603, Topkapı Palace, Constantinople; buried in Şehzade Mahmud Mausoleum, Şehzade Mosque) – with Halime.
- Ahmed I (18 April 1590, Manisa Palace, Manisa – 22 November 1617, Topkapı Palace, Constantinople; buried in Ahmed I Mausoleum, Sultan Ahmed Mosque) – with Handan. 14th Sultan of the Ottoman Empire.
- Şehzade Osman (c. 1597, Topkapı Palace, Constantinople – c. 1601, Topkapı Palace, Constantinople; buried in Hagia Sophia Mosque).
- Şehzade Fülan (c. 1597/1598, Topkapi Palace, Constantinople - 1598, Topkapi Palace, Constantinople; buried in Hagia Sophia Mosque) – with Fülane. He died with his mother of plague or smallpox.
- Şehzade Cihangir (?, Constantinople – 1602). Possibly with Halime or Handan or any other concubine.
- Mustafa I (c. 1600/1602, Topkapi Palace, Constantinople – 20 January 1639, Eski Palace, Constantinople, buried in Mustafa I Mausoleum, Hagia Sophia Mosque) – with Halime. 15th Sultan of the Ottoman Empire.

=== Daughters ===
Mehmed III had at least ten daughters:

- Fatma Sultan (c. 1584, Manisa – after 1621, Constantinople?) – with Handan. She firstly married in 1600 to Mahmud Pasha, sanjakbey of Cairo, secondly in 1604 to Tiryaki Hasan Pasha (d. 1611) and had a son and two daughters, finally in 1616 to Güzelce Ali Pasha, Grand Vizier, until his death in 1621.
- Ayşe Sultan (c. 1587, Manisa – after 1614, Constantinople?) – with Handan. She married Destari Mustafa Pasha, with whom she had a son and two daughters, who died in infancy. Some sources also suggest that she remarried to Gazi Hüsrev Pasha. She was buried in Destari's türbe (Şehzade Mosque) with their children.
- Şah Sultan (c. 1588, Manisa – c. 1618, Constantinople?) – with Handan. She was married firstly to Damat Mirahur Mustafa Pasha in 1604, with whom she had children; she was widowed in 1610 and remarried Mahmud Pasha in February 1612. She was described as the most beloved sister of her younger brother Ahmed I.
- Beyhan Sultan (before 1590, Manisa – after 1629); married in 1612 to Damat Halil Pasha. They had two sons, Sultanzade Mahmud Bey and Sultanzade Ebubekir Bey.
- Hatice Sultan (1590, Manisa – after December 1617, Constantinople) – with Halime. She was married to janissary commander Mustafa Aga. She was buried in her own türbe in Şehzade Mosque.
- Fülane Sultan (1592, Manisa – after 1623, Constantinople) – with Halime. She was married in 1604 (consummated in March 1606) to Damat Kara Davud Pasha, Grand Vizier. She had a son, Sultanzade Süleyman Bey, and a daughter. Her name is unknown.
- Hümaşah Sultan (? – ?); she was married in October 1613 to Cağaloğlu Mahmud Pasha, after her half-sister Hatice's death.
- Esra Sultan? (? – ?); she was married to Ali Pasha, being widowed in 1617.
- Ümmügülsüm Sultan? (? – after 1622); she was among the unmarried princesses in 1622 and possibly a daughter of Mehmed's.
- Halime Sultan? (1598? – after 1622); she was among the unmarried princesses in 1622 and possibly a daughter of Mehmed's.
- Akile Sultan? (? – after 1622); she was among the unmarried princesses in 1622 and possibly a daughter of Mehmed's.
- Hanzade Sultan? (? – after 1622); she was among the unmarried princesses in 1622 and possibly a daughter of Mehmed's.

== Bibliography ==
- Börekçi, Günhan (June 1, 2009). "İnkırâzın Eşiğinde Bir Hanedan: III. Mehmed, I. Ahmed, I. Mustafa ve 17. Yüzyıl Osmanlı Siyasî Krizi" [A Dynasty on the Brink of Collapse: III. Mehmed, I. Ahmed, I. Mustafa and the 17th Century Ottoman Political Crisis]. Divan: Disiplinlerarası Çalışmalar Dergisi (in Turkish) (26). Bilim ve Sanat Vakfı: 45–96. ISSN 1309-6834.
- Börekçi, Günhan (2010). Factions And Favorites At The Courts Of Sultan Ahmed I (r. 1603-17) And His Immediate Predexessors (Thesis). Ohio State University.
- Börekçi, Günhan (2020). "A Queen-Mother at Work: On Handan Sultan and Her Regency During the Early Reign of Ahmed I". The Journal of Southeastern European Studies (34): 45–92. doi:10.26650/gaad.20213403. S2CID 236832964.
- Pedani, Maria Pia (2000). "Safiye's Household and Venetian Diplomacy". Turcica. 32: 9–32. doi:10.2143/TURC.32.0.460.
- Peirce, Leslie P. (1993). The Imperial Harem: Women and Sovereignty in the Ottoman Empire. New York: Oxford University Press, Inc. ISBN 0-19-507673-7.
- Tezcan, Baki (2008). "The Debut of Kösem Sultan's Political Career". Turcica. 40: 347–359. doi:10.2143/TURC.40.0.2037143.
- Tezcan, Baki (2001). Searching for Osman : a reassessment of the deposition of the Ottoman sultan Osman II (1618-1622) unpublished PhD. thesis (Thesis). Princeton University.

Mehmed III House of Osman Born: May 26, 1566 Died: December 22, 1603[aged 37]
Regnal titles
Preceded by Murad III	Sultan of the Ottoman Empire; January 15, 1595 – December 22, 1603	Succeeded by Ahmed I
Sunni Islam titles
Preceded by Murad III	Caliph of the Ottoman Caliphate; January 15, 1595 – December 22, 1603	Succeeded by Ahmed I
