= Mustafa I =

Sultan of the Ottoman Empire (r. 1617–1618, 1622–1623)

- Custodian of the Two Holy Mosques
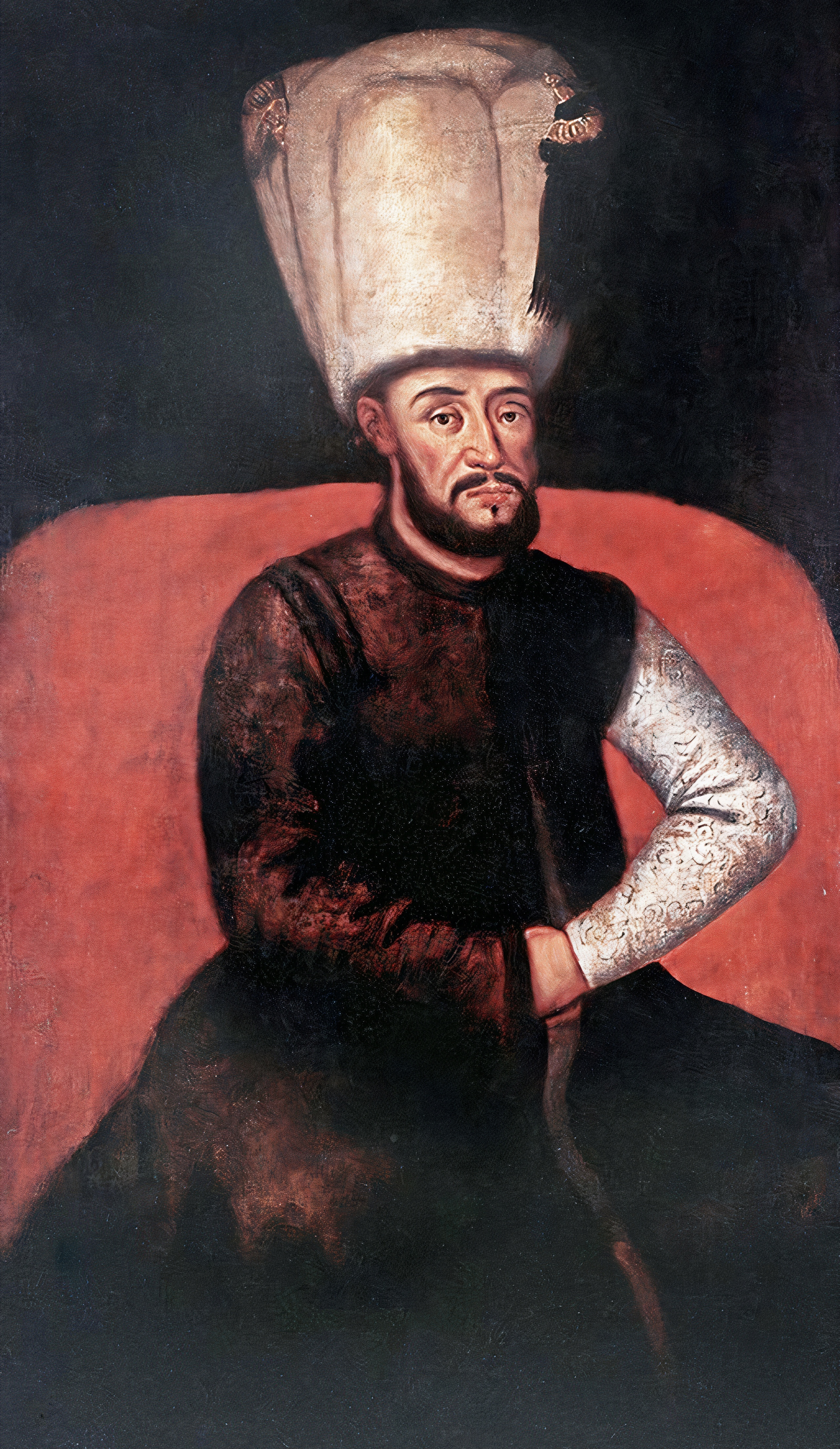
- Oil painting of Sultan Mustafa I

Sultan of the Ottoman Empire (Padishah)
- 1st reign: 22 November 1617 – 26 February 1618
- Predecessor: Ahmed I
- Successor: Osman II
- 2nd reign: 20 May 1622 – 10 September 1623
- Predecessor: Osman II
- Successor: Murad IV

Ottoman Caliph (Amir al-Mu'minin)
- Predecessor: Ahmed I
- Successor: Osman II
- Predecessor: Osman II
- Successor: Murad IV
- Born: 1601 or 1602; Topkapi Palace, Constantinople, Ottoman Empire
- Died: 20 January 1639 (aged 36–38); Eski Saray, Constantinople, Ottoman Empire
- Burial: Hagia Sophia, Istanbul
Names
- Mustafa bin Mehmed
- Dynasty: Ottoman
- Father: Mehmed III
- Mother: Halime Sultan
- Religion: Sunni Islam
- Tughra

Mustafa I (/ˈmʊstəfə/; Ottoman Turkish: مصطفى اول; Turkish: I. Mustafa; 1601 or 1602 – 20 January 1639) was twice the sultan of the Ottoman Empire from 22 November 1617 to 26 February 1618, and from 20 May 1622 to 10 September 1623. He was the son of sultan Mehmed III and Halime Sultan.

== Early life ==
Mustafa was born in 1601 or 1602 in the Topkapi Palace. He was son of Sultan Mehmed III and Halime Sultan, an Abkhazian concubine.

Before 1603 it was customary for an Ottoman Sultan to have his brothers executed shortly after ascending the throne, (Mustafa's father Mehmed III had executed his nineteen half-brothers). But when the thirteen-year-old Ahmed I, Mustafa's older half-brother, was enthroned in 1603, he spared the life of Mustafa. Handan Sultan, mother of Ahmed I, was crucial to Mustafa's survival, as she convinced her son to spare his life, not believing him to be a threat due to him being considered mentally weak.

A factor in Mustafa's survival is the influence of Kösem Sultan (Ahmed's favorite consort), who may have wished to preempt the succession of Sultan Osman II, Ahmed's first-born son from another concubine. If Osman became Sultan, he would likely try to execute his half-brothers, the sons of Ahmed and Kösem. (This scenario later became a reality when Osman II executed his half-brother Mehmed, the oldest son of Ahmed and Kösem, in 1621.) Furthermore, when Ahmed ascended the throne, Mustafa was the only possible heir. Had Ahmed executed him and then died sonless, the dynasty would have died out. However, the reports of foreign ambassadors suggest that Ahmed actually liked his half-brother: he had been on good terms with his older half-brother Şehzade Mahmud (full brother of Mustafa, executed by his father Mehmed III and his grandmother Safiye Sultan) and was shocked by his death, and also felt sympathy for Mustafa's very young age.

Mustafa lived at first in the Old Palace, along with his mother, and grandmother Safiye Sultan and later in the Kafes until Ahmed's death in 1617.

== First reign (1617–1618) ==
Ahmed's death created a dilemma never before experienced by the Ottoman Empire. Multiple princes were now eligible for the sultanate, and all of them lived in Topkapı Palace. A faction headed by the Şeyhülislam Esad Efendi and Sofu Mehmed Pasha (who represented the Grand Vizier when he was away from Constantinople) decided to enthrone Mustafa instead of Ahmed's son Osman. Sofu Mehmed argued that Osman was too young to be enthroned without causing discord among the population. The Chief Black Eunuch, Mustafa Agha, objected, citing Mustafa's mental problems, but he was overruled. Mustafa's rise created a new succession principle of seniority (where the oldest prince would rise to the throne) that would last until the end of the Empire. It was the first time an Ottoman sultan was succeeded by his brother instead of his son. His mother Halime Sultan became the Valide sultan, as well as regent, and wielded great power. Due to Mustafa's mental conditions, she acted as regent and exercised power more directly.

It was hoped that regular social contact would improve Mustafa's mental health, but his behavior remained eccentric. He pulled off the turbans of his viziers and yanked their beards. Others observed him throwing coins to birds and fish. The Ottoman historian İbrahim Peçevi wrote "this situation was seen by all men of state and the people, and they understood that he was mentally disturbed."

== Deposition ==
Mustafa was never more than a tool of court cliques at the Topkapı Palace. In 1618, after a short rule, another palace faction deposed him in favour of his young nephew Osman II (1618–1622), and Mustafa was sent back to the Old Palace. The conflict between the Janissaries and Osman II presented him with a second chance. After a Janissary rebellion led to the deposition and assassination of Osman II in 1622, Mustafa was restored to the throne and held it for another year.

== Alleged mental instability ==
It is stated that Mustafa I was mentally unstable when he ascended to the throne. Nevertheless, according to Baki Tezcan, there is not enough evidence to properly establish that Mustafa was mentally imbalanced when he came to the throne. Mustafa "made a number of excursions to the arsenal and the navy docks, examining various sorts of arms and taking an active interest in the munitions supply of the army and the navy." One of the dispatches of Baron de Sancy, the French ambassador, "suggested that Mustafa was interested in leading the Safavid campaign himself and was entertaining the idea of wintering in Konya for that purpose."

Moreover, one contemporary observer provides an explanation of the coup which does not mention the incapacity of Mustafa. Baron de Sancy ascribes the deposition as a political conspiracy between the grand admiral Ali Pasha and Chief Black Eunuch Mustafa Agha, who were angered by the former's removal from office upon Sultan Mustafa's accession. They may have circulated rumors of the sultan's mental instability subsequent to the coup in order to legitimize it.

== Second reign (1622–1623) ==
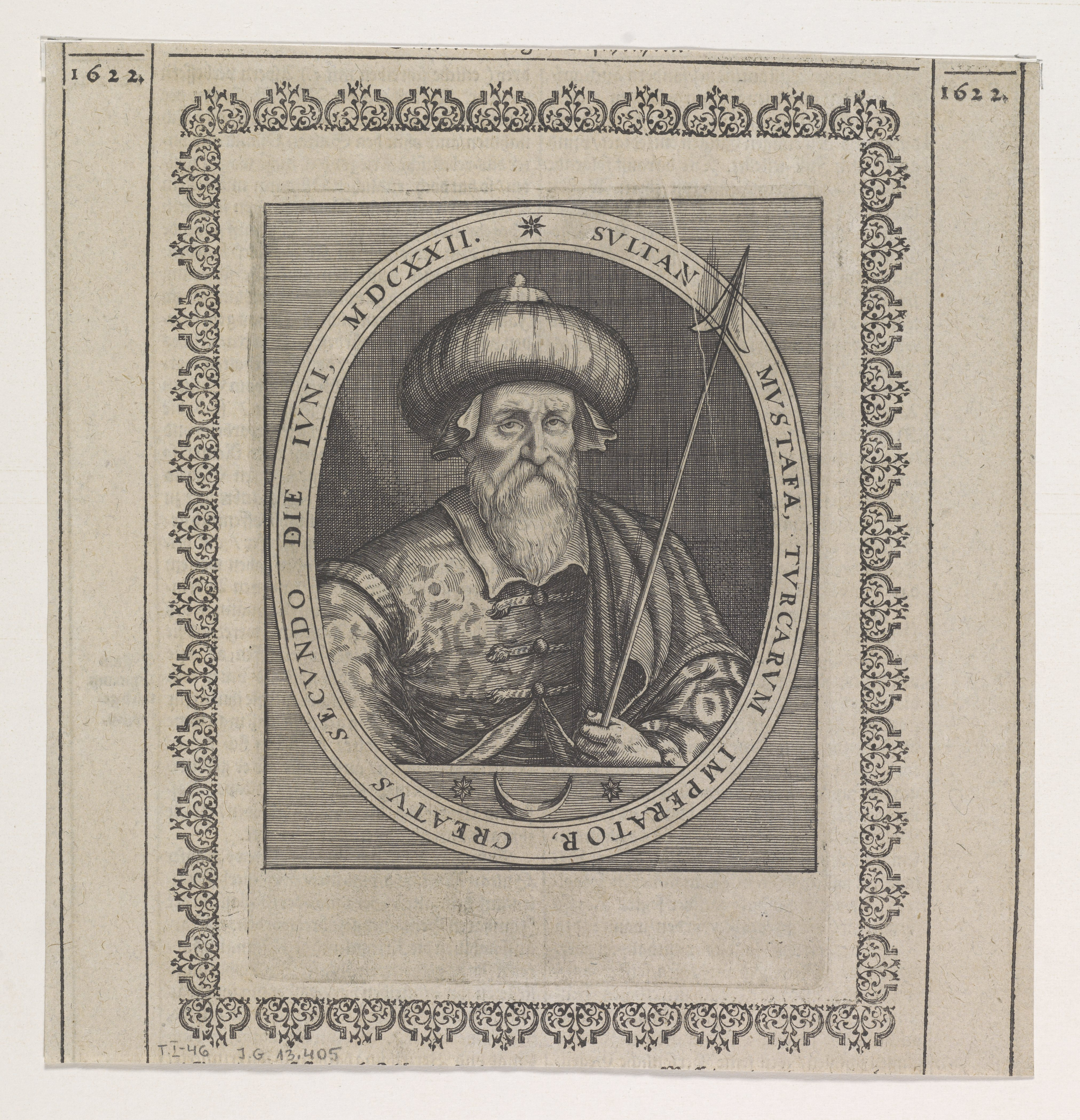
Engraving of Mustafa I by Matthäus Merian the Elder, 1650

Mustafa commenced his second reign by executing all those who had taken any part in the murder of Sultan Osman. Hoca Ömer Efendi, the chief of the rebels, the kızlar Agha Suleiman Agha, the vizier Dilaver Pasha, the Kaim-makam Ahmed Pasha, the defterdar Baki Pasha, the segban-bashi Nasuh Agha, and the general of the Janissaries Ali Agha, were executed.

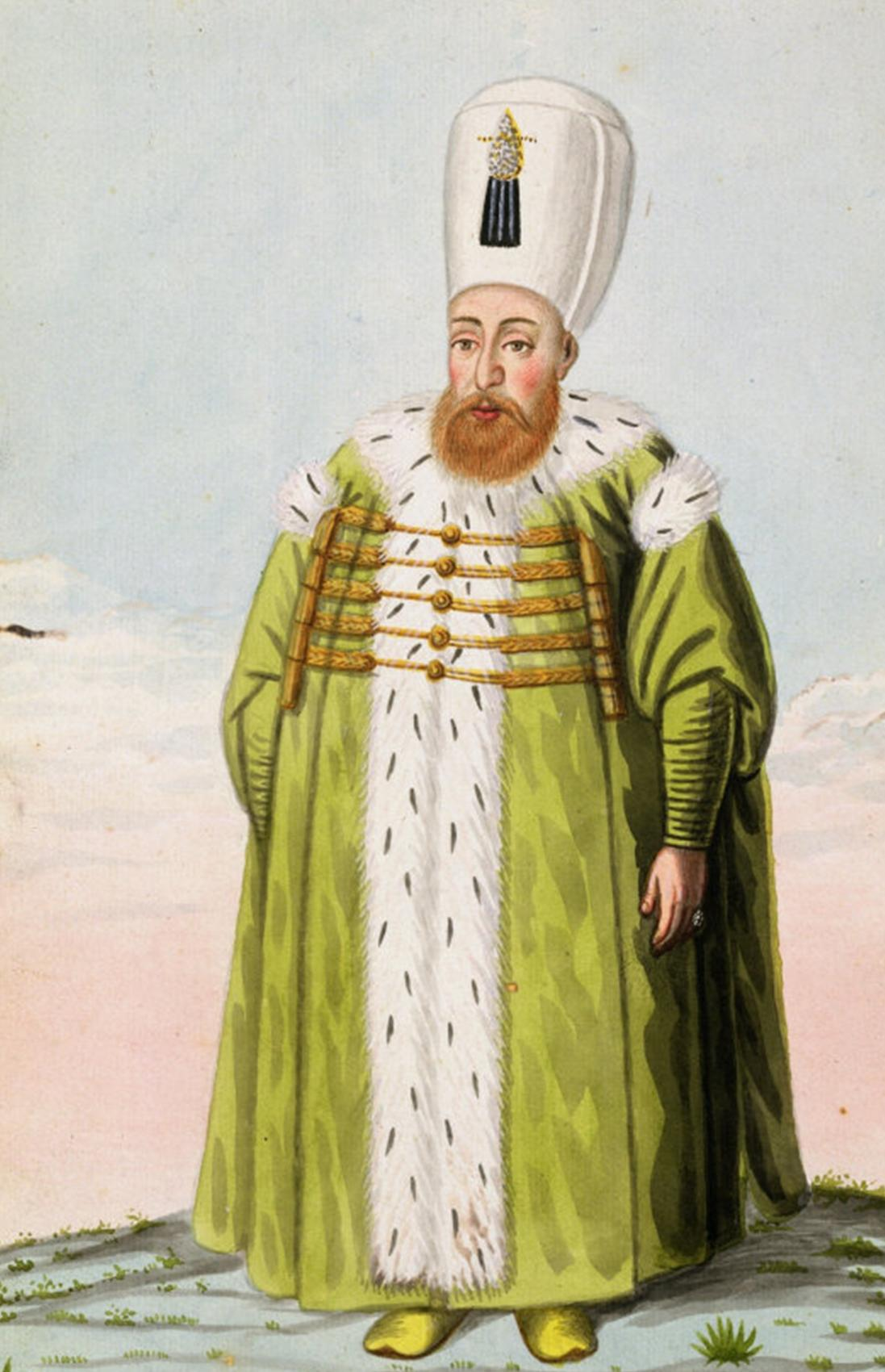
Portrait of Sultan Mustafa I by John Young, 1815

The epithet "Veli" (meaning "saint") was used in reference to him during his reign.

His mental condition unimproved, Mustafa was a puppet controlled by his mother and brother-in-law, the grand vizier Kara Davud Pasha. He believed that Osman II was still alive and was seen searching for him throughout the palace, knocking on doors and crying out to his nephew to relieve him from the burden of sovereignty. "The present emperor being a fool" (according to English Ambassador Sir Thomas Roe), he was compared unfavorably with his predecessor. In fact, it was his mother Halime Sultan the de facto-co-ruler as Valide Sultan of the Ottoman Empire.

== Deposition and last years ==
Political instability was generated by conflict between the Janissaries and the sipahis (Ottoman cavalry), followed by the Abaza rebellion, which occurred when the governor-general of Erzurum, Abaza Mehmed Pasha, decided to march on Istanbul to avenge the murder of Osman II. The regime tried to end the conflict by executing Kara Davud Pasha, but Abaza Mehmed continued his advance. Clerics and Kemankeş Kara Ali Pasha prevailed upon Mustafa's mother to allow the deposition of her son. She agreed, on the condition that Mustafa's life would be spared.

The 11-year-old Murad IV, son of Ahmed I and Kösem, was enthroned on 10 September 1623. Mustafa was sent to the Kafes for the rest of his life, while his mother was sent to the Old Palace, where she died.

== Death ==
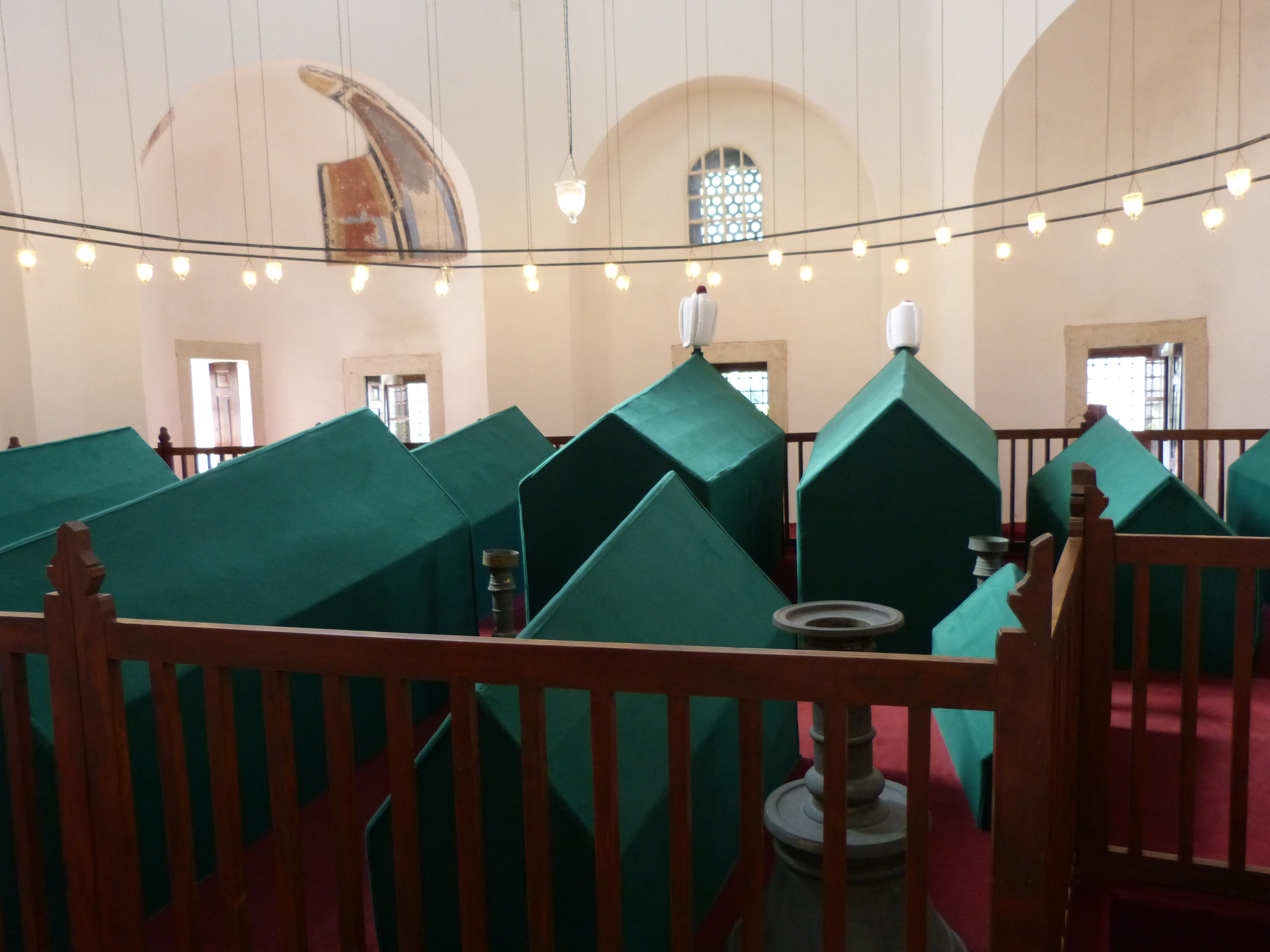
Tomb of Mustafa I and Ibrahim

Mustafa died in the Kafes on 20 January 1639. One source states that he died of epilepsy which was caused by being imprisoned for the majority of his life. Another source states that he was executed by the orders of Sultan Murad IV, who was on his death bed, and rumors say that he wanted to end the lineage. He is buried in the courtyard of the Haghia Sophia.

== In popular culture ==
In the 2015 Turkish television series Muhteşem Yüzyıl: Kösem, Mustafa was portrayed by several actors:

- Alihan Türkdemir, when Mustafa is a young prince;
- Boran Kuzum, when Mustafa is Sultan;
- Cüneyt Uzunlar, when Mustafa is old and he is imprisoned in the Kafes.

== See also ==
- Transformation of the Ottoman Empire

== Notes ==
Mustafa I House of Osman Born: c. 1600 Died: 20 January 1639
Regnal titles
Preceded by Ahmed I	Sultan of the Ottoman Empire; 22 November 1617 – 26 February 1618	Succeeded by Osman II
Preceded by Osman II	Sultan of the Ottoman Empire; 20 May 1622 – 10 September 1623	Succeeded by Murad IV
Sunni Islam titles
Preceded by Ahmed I	Caliph of the Ottoman Dynasty; 22 November 1617 – 26 February 1618	Succeeded by Osman II
Preceded by Osman II	Caliph of the Ottoman Dynasty; 20 May 1622 – 10 September 1623	Succeeded by Murad IV
