= Halime Sultan =

Valide Sultan of the Ottoman Empire (1617–1618, 1622–1623)

- Valide Sultan

Valide Sultan of the Ottoman Empire
- First tenure: 22 November 1617 – 26 February 1618
- Predecessor: Handan Sultan
- Successor: Herself (1622)
- Second tenure: 20 May 1622 – 10 September 1623
- Predecessor: Herself (1618)
- Successor: Kösem Sultan
- Born: c. 1570; Abkhazia, Ottoman Empire
- Died: after 1623; Old Palace, Constantinople, Ottoman Empire
- Burial: Mustafa I Mausoleum, Hagia Sophia Mosque, Istanbul
- Consort of: Mehmed III (died 1603)
- Issue: Şehzade Mahmud; Hatice Sultan; Fülane Sultan; Halime Sultan (?); Mustafa I
- House: House of Osman (by marriage)
- Religion: Sunni Islam or Nigromancy, previously Eastern Orthodox

Halime Sultan (Ottoman Turkish: حلیمه سلطان; c. 1570 – after 1623) was a consort of Sultan Mehmed III, and the mother of Sultan Mustafa I. She was the first woman to serve as Valide Sultan twice, and the only one to hold this position twice for the same son. She was a de facto co ruler of Ottoman Empire as Valide Sultan from 1617 to 1618 and again from 1622 to 1623, as her son was mentally unstable. Halime was also one of the prominent figures during the era known as the Sultanate of Women.

Halime lived in the Ottoman Empire as a courtier during the reign of seven Sultans: Murad III, Mehmed III, Ahmed I, Mustafa I, Osman II, Murad IV.

== Early life ==
She was born around 1570. A slave concubine of Abkhazian origin, Halime Sultan, whose original name is unknown, entered Mehmed's Imperial harem via the Black Sea slave trade when he was still a prince and the governor of Saruhan (Manisa) Sanjak. She gave birth at least four children, two sons and two daughters. After Sultan Murad III's death in 1595, she came to Constantinople along with Prince Mehmed.

== As Consort ==
In Constantinople, her son Mahmud was very popular with the janissaries. During the reign of her husband she was described as the "favorite" of the sultan, however she did not hold the title of Haseki sultan. Before her son's execution on 7 June 1603 Halime tried to persuade her husband into sending her son to province in which she had support among the viziers and the janissaries.

She sent a message to a religious seer for she was superstitious, and anxious to know if her son would become the next Sultan, and how much longer her husband would reign. The seer responded, but the message was intercepted by Abdürrezzak Agha, the chief black eunuch of the imperial harem, and who later gave it to Mehmed and Safiye, instead of her. The message said that Mehmed would die within six months without showing whether by death or deposition, and her son will become the next Sultan. Safiye incensed Mehmed, and he had Mahmud executed, who indeed knew nothing of his mother's action.

English ambassador Lello and the Venetian bailo Contarini both indicate that Safiye Sultan was the mastermind behind the execution of Şehzade Mahmud, a solution which she apparently put forward in order not only to relieve the sultan of deposition anxiety but also to eliminate Halime Sultan, of whom she was reportedly “very jealous”.

Mahmud's followers who were supposed to be involved in the matter were thrown into the sea. It was also rumored that she was also executed. However, she was sent to the Eski (old) Palace located at the Beyazıt Square by the end of June. Mehmed died just six months after Mahmud's death. On Friday, January 9, 1604, Safiye Sultan, along with Şehzade Mustafa were also sent to the Eski Palace. Between Mehmed's death and Mustafa's enthronement her stipend consisted of 100 aspers a day.

== As Valide Sultan ==
=== First tenure ===
When Mustafa ascended the throne in 1617 she became the Valide Sultan and wielded a great power. While she, as a consort of Mehmed, had suffered the same obscurity as Handan Sultan, she was clearly able to command greater status as Valide Sultan than her fellow consort had. This was probably in large measure because she exercised power more directly, for her mentally incompetent son as his mental condition deteriorated.

No one had expected that Mustafa, who suffered from severe emotional problems, would become sultan, and so she had not enjoyed a position of much status within the imperial harem. She received 3,000 aspers although her mother-in-law Safiye Sultan was still alive. Her fellow consort Handan Sultan received only 1,000 aspers as Valide Sultan. Kösem Sultan, the Haseki Sultan to Ahmed I, his favorite consort and legal wife, lost her position in Topkapi Palace and she retired in the Old palace after Mustafa I ascended along with her son .

She had a potential ally in Kara Davud Pasha, but during Mustafa's first reign which lasted for only three months, she was unable to exploit her relationship by appointing Davud Pasha vizier. One of the few political alliances the valide was able to forge with her son's sword-bearer, Mustafa Agha, a high ranking inner palace officer, who was brought out of the palace and awarded the prestigious and strategically vital post of governor of Egypt on condition that he would marry the Sultan's wet nurse. Within a few months the pasha was brought back to Istanbul as grand vizier.

=== Osman's reign ===
Later, Mustafa was dethroned and his nephew Osman II ascended the throne due to Mustafa's mental condition. Mustafa was sent back to the kafes. She and her daughter Şah were sent to the Eski Palace. However, she received only 2,000 aspers during her retirement to the Old Palace between her son's two reigns; during the first months of her retirement Safiye was still alive, perhaps a neighbour in the Old Palace, receiving 3,000 aspers a day. Also, Kösem Sultan received 1,000 aspers a day during her retirement in the Old Palace. From her location in the Old Palace, she was a key figure in the deposition and assassination of Osman II and showed that she was no stranger to the art of damat politic. The basic and exceptional weakness from which Osman II suffered was the conspicuous absence of a female power basis in the harem. From 1620 until Osman's death, a governess (daye hatun, lit. wet-nurse) was appointed as a stand-in valide, and she could not counterbalance the contriving of Halime Sultan in the Old Palace.

=== Second tenure ===
Seeking a counterweight to Janissary influence, Osman II closed their coffee shops and started planning to create a new and more loyal army consisting of Anatolian sekbans. The result was a palace uprising by the Janissaries which was supported by Halime Sultan as she wanted to free her son from his confinement and become the Valide Sultan once again, after Mustafa was freed she formed the new government in her son's name. Later on 18 May 1622 Osman was dethroned and the rebels, meanwhile, broke into the imperial palace and freed Mustafa from his confinement and acclaimed him as their master. She once again returned from the Old Palace and became the Valide Sultan. Some of the janissaries consulted with her about the appointments to be made and it was in fact her son-in-law, Kara Davud Pasha, who became the grand vizier. The faction committed to the cause of Mustafa and she could not feel secure while Osman II was alive. Their uneasiness was well grounded, since some of the rebels wished to spare Osman, hoping no doubt to make no use of him for their own ends at some future date. Kara Davud Pasha had recourse, therefore to the last extreme measure on 20 May 1622, Osman II was strangled in the prison of Yedikule in Constantinople.

=== Murad's enthronement ===
After Osman's death, the governor general of Erzurum, Abaza Mehmed Pasha, decided to advance to Istanbul to settle the score with the murderers of Osman II. Kara Davud Pasha was chosen as a scapegoat and was executed in an attempt to modify the discontent and preempt the rebellions that were building up in the empire, but to no avail: Mehmed Pasha, despite the offers made by the emissaries from the capital, continued his advance. Faced with an ever-deepening crises, clerics and the new Grand Vizier Kemankeş Kara Ali Pasha petitioned her to agree to the deposition of her son in favour of eleven year old Şehzade Murad, the oldest surviving son of Ahmed I. She concurred, only pleading that her son's life be spared. Accordingly, Mustafa was dethroned and incarcerated again.

== Death ==
Halime died after 1623, She is buried in the mausoleum of her son Mustafa I in Hagia Sophia Mosque.

== Issue ==
Together with Mehmed, Halime had at least two confirmed sons and two confirmed daughters:

- Şehzade Mahmud (1587, Manisa Palace, Manisa – 7 June 1603, Topkapı Palace, Constantinople; executed under Mehmed III's order, buried in Şehzade Mahmud Mausoleum, Şehzade Mosque).
- Hatice Sultan (1590, Manisa – after December 1617, Constantinople), she was married to Mustafa Aga, a janissary commander.
- Fülane Sultan (1592, Manisa – after 1623, Constantinople) married in 1604 (consummated in March 1606) to Kara Davud Pasha, later Grand Vizier. They had a son, Sultanzade Süleyman Bey, and a daughter. Her name is unknown.
- Mustafa I (1600/1602, Topkapi Palace, Constantinople – 20 January 1639, Kafes, Eski Palace, Constantinople; buried in Mustafa I Mausoleum, Hagia Sophia Mosque), Sultan of the Ottoman Empire.

She was possibly the mother of:

- Halime Sultan (c. 1598? – after 1622) - possible daughter of Halime, maybe named in her honour; she was mentioned as unmarried in 1622.

== In popular culture ==
- In the 2015 TV series Muhteşem Yüzyıl: Kösem, Halime Sultan is portrayed by Turkish actress Aslıhan Gürbüz.
- In his poem Osman Ivan Gundulić describes Halime as omnipotent witch

== See also ==
- Ottoman dynasty
- Ottoman family tree
- List of Valide Sultans
- List of consorts of the Ottoman Sultans

== Bibliography ==
- Börekçi, Günhan (2009). "İnkırâzın Eşiğinde Bir Hanedan: III. Mehmed, I. Ahmed, I. Mustafa ve 17. Yüzyıl Osmanlı Siyasî Krizi" [A Dynasty on the Brink of Collapse: III. Mehmed, I. Ahmed, I. Mustafa and the 17th Century Ottoman Political Crisis]. Divan: Disiplinlerarası Çalışmalar Dergisi (in Turkish) (26). Bilim ve Sanat Vakfı: 45–96. ISSN 1309-6834.
- Börekçi, Günhan (2010). Factions And Favorites At The Courts Of Sultan Ahmed I (r. 1603-17) And His Immediate Predecessors (Thesis).
- Peirce, Leslie (1993). The Imperial Harem: Women and Sovereignty in the Ottoman Empire. Oxford University Press. ISBN 0-19-508677-5.

Ottoman royalty
| Preceded by Handan Sultan | Valide Sultan; 22 November 1617 – 26 February 1618; 19 May 1622 – 10 September 1623 | Succeeded by Kösem Sultan |
