= Siege of Kanizsa (1600) =

Siege of Nagykanizsa (1600)
- Part of the Long War; Ottoman–Habsburg wars (1593 – c. 1606)
Date	10 September – 23 October 1600
Location	Nagykanizsa
Result	Ottoman victory

Belligerents
Ottoman Empire	Habsburg Monarchy

Commanders and leaders
Tiryaki Hasan Pasha	Georg Paradeiser (executed)

Strength
60,000	50,000

Casualties and losses
Light	Heavy

The Siege of Kanizsa was a siege that took place in 1600. The Ottoman army under the command of Tiryaki Hasan Pasha captured the Kanizsa Castle as a result of the siege that lasted between September 10 and October 23, 1600.

== Background ==
The Ottoman army spent the winter of 1599–1600 in Belgrade. After completing the necessary preparations for the operation and the expected janissaries from the Crimean forces and Istanbul joined, Belgrade set off from Belgrade in early August. Ibrahim Pasha's operation target was to retake Estergon, which had been under German/Austrian occupation since 1595. Kuyucu Murad Pasha was also ordered to retake Babofça, which was under German/Austrian occupation, and Murad Pasha captured the castle in a short time.

When the army arrived in Osijek, Damat İbrahim Pasha met with the former Budin Beylerbeyi Tiryaki Hasan Pasha, whom he had summoned from Pécs, and the following operation plan was discussed in the war council. Tiryaki Hasan Pasha stated that the German/Austrian troops stationed in the Nagykanizsa castle were very daring, and pointed out that if the army marched on Estergon, the forces in Nagykanizsa could launch a counter-attack and destroy the bridges over the Drava and Sava rivers, endangering the army's rear, and suggested that this danger be eliminated by first capturing Nagykanizsa. When this proposal of Tiryaki Hasan Pasha was accepted by Serdar Damat İbrahim Pasha, the army advanced to Nagykanizsa. Hasan Pasha was also sent to the Budin Guard with the duty of Budin Beylerbeyi against an attack that could come from the north (Beylerbeyi Süleyman Pasha had been captured by the Germans in a raid).

The acting governor of Budin Beylerbeyi Rumelia Beylerbeyi Lala Mehmed Pasha also marched to Kanizsa with the Rumelia army and the French soldiers (who had joined the Ottomans) in the Papa castle (which had been captured). The Ottoman army arrived in front of the castle on September 10, 1600, and began preparations for a siege, and on September 12, it completely surrounded the castle.

== Siege ==
Nagykanizsa Castle was difficult to position for cannons and troops due to the swampy surroundings. While the siege continued with mutual cannon fire, two important developments turned the struggle in favor of the Turkish army. The first of these was that 170 Turkish prisoners in the castle blew up the gunpowder depot at the cost of their lives. Indeed; one of the two large towers was completely destroyed, and the garrison in the castle could not fire cannon fire and had to make do with rifle fire for a long time.

The second significant development was that the German army, consisting of 40,000 infantry and cavalry, which was preparing to attack Budin, headed towards Kanije in order to break the siege, and this army retreated after being defeated by the Turkish army as a result of the cavalry charge of the Crimean horsemen in the battles on 8–12 October 1600.

Following these two developments, the commander of the castle garrison, whose chances of escaping the siege were diminishing, Georg Paradeiser's offer to surrender with a vire was accepted by Damat İbrahim Pasha. While the German garrison evacuated the castle without any problems, Turkish soldiers entered Kanije on 23 October 1600 and captured all the ammunition along with 76 cannons.

== Aftermath ==
The German commander Georg Paradeiser, who left the castle freely, and some of his leading figures were sentenced to death when they returned to Austria due to the surrender of the castle to the Ottomans. The sentence was carried out on October 9, 1601.

The Ottomans Transforming Kanije into a province brought Tiryaki Hasan Pasha to the Beylerbeylik. The sanjaks of Osijek, Siklós and Pécs were attached to this new province as arpalık. The Ottoman army moved to camp near Berzence and after a new palisade was built here (Yenikale), it returned to Osijek and dispersed to winter quarters.
