= Tiryaki Hasan Pasha =

Ottoman commander in the Long Turkish War

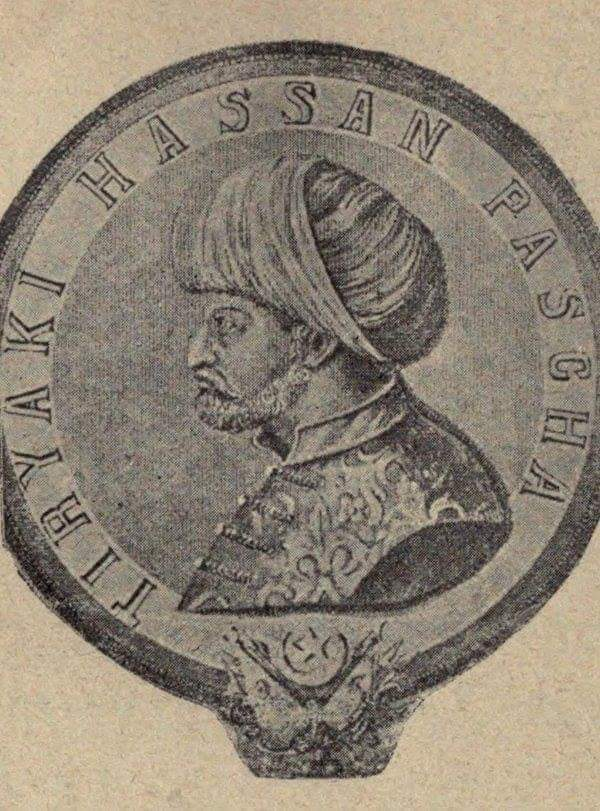
- Born: c. 1530
- Died: 1611; Budin, Ottoman Empire
- Spouse: Fatma Sultan (m. 1604)
- Children: A son Two daughters
- Military career
- Rank: Beylerbey of Bosnia, Budin and Rumelia
- Conflicts: Siege of Nagykanizsa (1600); Defense of Nagykanizsa; Battle of Oruç Ovası; Capture Veszprém and Palota; Celali rebellions

Tiryaki Hasan Pasha (Turkish: Tiryaki Hasan Paşa; c. 1530 – 1611) also called Alacaatlı Hasan Pasha, was an Ottoman military commander, who participated in the Long Turkish War. He received his education in the Enderun school. He is well-known for commanding the Ottoman troops at the Siege of Nagykanizsa, where he defeated the Habsburg army despite being outnumbered.

Ottoman historian Mehmed Süreyya recorded that Tiryaki never suffered a single defeat in any battles he participated in during his life.

== Biography ==
He was one of the attendants of Prince (Turkish: Şehzade) Murad when Murad was the governor of Manisa. After Murad became sultan (Murad III), Hasan was promoted to provincial governor. After a short time, he was sent to Szigetvár as a governor and served as the Beylerbey of Bosnia in 1594. He participated in the Vaç Expedition in October 1595. In a battle in Wallachia, when those around him retreated, Tiryaki Hasan Pasha is said to have ridden horse alone and prevented the battlefield from being completely overrun by the enemies. Tiryaki also became a somewhat "father figure" towards Transivalnian prince Gabriel Bethlen.

In 1600, during Long Turkish War, the Ottoman army occupied Kanije (modern Nagykanizsa in southwest Hungary). the fortress fell to Tiryaki Hasan Pasha after he besieged it. Its commander, Georg Paradeiser, surrendered through his message to Damat İbrahim Pasha. Tiryaki Hasan Pasha then garrisoned the city with 7,000-9,000 men.

However, in the next year, Ferdinand II tried to recapture the fort, with an army of 100,000, with the siege of Nagykanizsa that began on 9 September 1601. During the siege and frequent clashes, the Austrians lost 30,000 men. According to the Ottoman record of Nagykanizsa Gazavatname (Nagykanizsa campaign narrative), Tiryaki Hasan Pasha commanded his deputy, Kara Ömer Agha to let some enemy prisoners escape and blend into enemy forces of "a hundred and fifty bandur, and a five hundred Hungarian cavalry troopers" which were present in Nagykanizsa. (Note: Paul Stock is Associate Professor of London School of Economics. He mention the siege of Nagykanizsa in his book, The Uses of Space in Early Modern History.) Hasan then instructed Kara Ömer to ensure the prisoners hear the soldiers speak in Hungarian. Paul Stock suggested that this was an indication that there were Hungarian convert to Islam among the soldiers under Hasan. The "escaped prisoners" then spread information that the Ottomans had forged a secret alliance with the Hungarian and Croatian elements within Habsburg army. Tiryaki Hasan Pasha used counterintelligence tactics to sow discord among the enemy ranks and to boost his own troops' morale. These efforts turned his enemies against each other, and detachments of the Hungarian army abandoned their Austrian allies on the battlefield. He also tricked Ferdinand into believing that he had no cannons, and when the Austrians came under cannon fire, they mistakenly believed that a rescue force had arrived.

In October, Ferdinand had to end the skirmish temporarily because of the coming winter and resorted to constructing winter encampments around the fort to continue the siege until, on 18 November 1601, Hasan Pasha organized a surprise charge that routed Ferdinand's army. The skillful hidden movements of one hundred cannons during the defense and the concealing of his main cavalry until the last moment led to Tiryaki's successful defense of Kanije against a larger Austrian force. The Austrian army was driven back and 47 Austrian cannons were captured. For the next 89 years Kanije remained an Ottoman fort.

After the victory of Kanije, Hasan Pasha was promoted to Beylerbey (high governor) of Bosnia, and later of Budin and Rumelia. He was also rewarded by the sultan for his valiant defense of the fort against overwhelming enemy numbers. Tiryaki Hasan Pasa were also planned the military strategy during the Ottoman victorious battle at Oruç Ovası. Later, Tiryaki Hasan Pasha manage to capture Veszprém and Palota from the Habsburg empire. At the end of the Long Turkish war, Tiryaki Hasan Pasha opposed the conclusive decision to end of the war which resulted in the Ottoman's some territorial losses.

Later, the Celali rebellions broke out in Anatolia. Tiryaki Hasan Pasha lead Rumelian soldiers to Grand Vizier Kuyucu Murad Pasha, who was assigned to suppress these rebellions, where Tiryaki particularly active on the suppression of the rebels led by Ali Janbulad.

In 1608, he returned to Budin, where he died in 1611.

In 1604, he married Fatma Sultan, a daughter of Mehmed III and his consort Handan Hatun. With her he had a son and two daughters.

The "tiryaki" nickname is said to originate from his addiction to coffee.

== Modern culture ==
Hikaye-i Tiryaki Gazi Hasan Paşa (The History of Tiryaki Hasan Pasha) that was inscribed by Salih Ağa Divitdar on 21 March 1789 which has become a heroic model in Turkish culture, which portrays him based from corpus of Gazavat-i Tiryaki Hasan Paşa (the military expedition of Tiryaki Hasan) where he was depicted as religious, just, and competent national figure. The portrayal from Hikaye has spawned legend such as Tiryaki supernatural ability to predict the Habsburg army movement in Szigetvár by observing the unusual behavior from two flocks of birds.

His religious image derived from the record that Tiryaki always lead his men to pray before doing particularly difficult battles. the legendary stories about the corpses of fallen Ottoman soldiers in the siege of Nagykanizsa which still intact when unearthed from their burial also further strengthen the pious legend of Tiryaki Hasan, who served as commander of the battle.

Claire Norton, an Ottoman history expert from University of Birmingham, has noted the paradoxical view among Turkish culture regarding folks hero like Tiryaki Hasan Pasha, where on one side they view him as legendary hero with mythical attributes and religious piety on positive light, while on the other side they portray such heroes negatively with several characteristic like intemperate, treacherous, or opium addict.
