= Şehzade Mahmud (son of Mehmed III) =

Ottoman prince and Mehmed III's Son

Mahmud
- Born: c. 1587; Manisa Palace, Manisa, Ottoman Empire
- Died: 7 June 1603 (aged 15–16); Topkapı Palace, Istanbul, Ottoman Empire
- Burial: Şehzade Mosque, Istanbul
- Dynasty: Ottoman
- Father: Mehmed III
- Mother: Halime Sultan
- Religion: Sunni Islam

Şehzade Mahmud (Ottoman Turkish: شہزادہ محمود; c. 1587 – 7 June 1603) was an Ottoman prince, the son of sultan Mehmed III and his consort Halime Sultan. He was the grandson of sultan Murad III and Safiye Sultan, the half-brother of the future sultan Ahmed I and the brother of sultan Mustafa I.

== Early life ==
Şehzade Mahmud was born in Manisa Palace, when his father was still a prince, and the governor of the Saruhan Sanjak. His mother was Halime Sultan. Mahmud along with his brothers was educated by Mustafa Efendi, who was appointed by Mehmed in 1592. When Murad died in 1595, Şehzade Mehmed ascended the throne as Mehmed III, Mahmud came to Istanbul with his father. Upon ascending the throne, his father ordered the execution of his nineteen half-brothers.

== In Istanbul ==
In Istanbul, Mahmud was very popular with the Janissaries. His father, Mehmed, was disturbed by Mahmud’s eagerness to leave the palace and take up the role of warrior prince, especially since he himself had grown so fat that he could not campaign. Hoping to dispel his father’s worries over provincial rebellions and Safavid advances, Mahmud would ask his father to send him to suppress the rebellions and counter the Safavid advances, and to give him the command of the army. Whenever he spoke like that, Mahmud's brother, Şehzade Ahmed, would try unsuccessfully to stop him because this alarmed the paranoid Mehmed, who feared that the youth intended to mount a rebellion against him from within the palace.

On his part, Mahmud was distressed to see how his father was being manipulated by his grandmother, Safiye Sultan, with the result that the state was falling into ruin. It did not help his case that his mother was also not favoured by Safiye. According to Turkish tradition all princes were expected to work as provincial governors (Sanjak-bey) as a part of their training. However, Mahmud, being too young, was not yet circumcised, nor was he sent to govern any province because of the ongoing Jelali revolts and the long Turkish War (an indecisive land war between the Habsburg monarchy and the Ottoman Empire, primarily over the Principalities of Wallachia, Transylvania and Moldavia).

Rumors of a conspiracy to poison Mehmed in order to elevate Mahmud to the throne of the empire were spreading in the capital. Discussions took place among the viziers of the imperial council as to which of the sultan’s sons should be designated heir to the throne. The viziers were divided into two factions: one supporting Mahmud, the other favoring his brother Şehzade Ahmed. According to another rumor, if the conspiracy to assassinate the sultan failed, Mahmud would be secretly taken to a province, where he could easily gather an army and fight for the throne.

It further did not help Mahmud's case when his superstitious mother sent a message to a religious seer enquiring if her son would become the next Sultan, and how long her husband would reign. The man answered, but the message was intercepted by Abdürrezzak Agha, the chief black eunuch of the imperial harem, who gave it to Mehmed and Safiye, instead of her. The message said that Mehmed would die within six months, whether by natural causes or deposition, and her son will become the next Sultan. Safiye then instigated Mehmed into having Mahmud (who had known nothing of his mother's actions) investigated.

== Imprisonment ==
Mahmud was imprisoned and beaten to make him confess. After two days, he was beaten again, every time being struck two hundred blows but he did not confess. Then his mother was called for interrogation. She confessed that she did send a message to the religious seer to know about her son's fortune, but without any intention to hurt or thought of how it would distress her husband. But this statement did not satisfy Mehmed and his mother, Safiye.

The Sultan decided to consult with his grand vizier Yemişçi Hasan Pasha and the mufti on the issue. He demanded a legal opinion from Mufti Ebulmeyamin Mustafa Efendi, whether he could execute his son or not. The mufti gave the opinion that he cannot execute his son without any witnesses, and could only be executed on the grounds that his death would satisfy his father.

== Execution ==
Mahmud was executed on 7 June 1603 by four deaf mutes in a harem room while Mehmed waited outside. After his order was carried out, Mehmed entered the room to make sure that Mahmud was dead. After Mahmud's death, Mehmed's remaining two sons were the future Sultans Ahmed I and Mustafa I. Mahmud's followers who were allegedly involved in the matter were thrown into the sea. While it was rumored that his mother was also executed, she was actually sent to the Old Palace by the end of June. After his death, Mahmud was remembered as courageous and jealous, and joined the category of those who were much loved by the janissaries, an Ottoman way of posthumously describing ambitious princes who did not make it.

== Aftermath ==
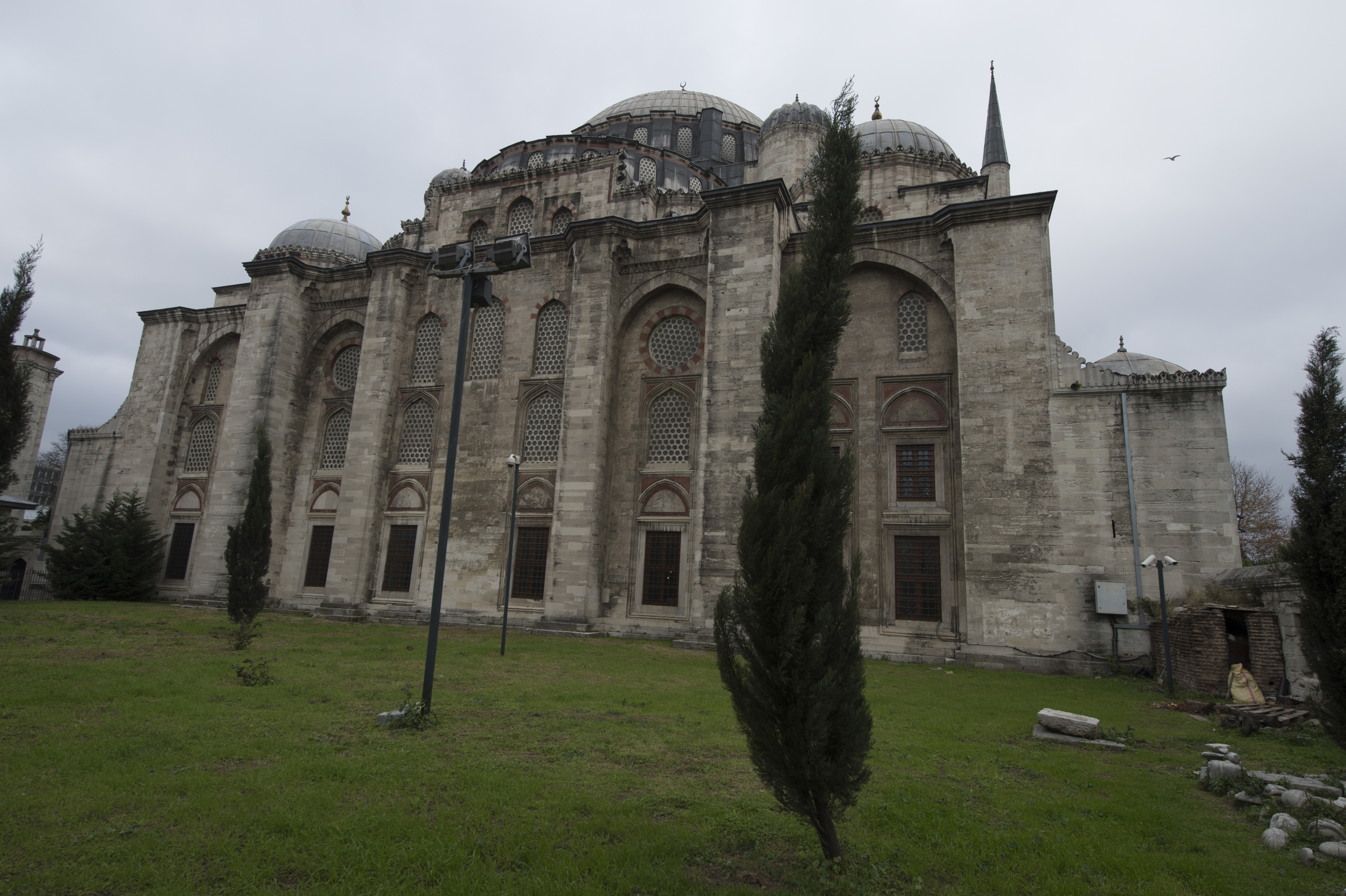
The sarcophagus of Şehzade Mahmud is located inside the Şehzade Mahmud Türbe of Şehzade Mosque in Istanbul

Mehmed III died on 22 December just six and a half months later, allegedly because of distress due to Mahmud's death. Mahmud's half-brother Ahmed then ascended the throne. Mahmud, who had been initially buried in obscurity, was then honored with reburial in a tomb built on the orders of his half-brother Ahmed, in the Şehzade Mosque, Istanbul. Ahmed also banished his grandmother, Safiye Sultan, to the Eski (old) Palace on January 1604 and replaced the chief black eunuch of the imperial harem, Abdürrezzak Agha, with a new one, Cevher Agha, for their roles in Mahmud's execution.

== In popular culture ==
In the 2015 popular TV series Muhteşem Yüzyıl: Kösem, Şehzade Mahmud is portrayed by as a child by Turkish actor Arda Taşarcan, and as adult by Turkish actor Barış Cankurtaran.

== Notes ==
1. According to Pietro Bertelli, Mehmed had five sons and the eldest was Selim in 1595-6. According to Venetian ambassador Leonardo Donato, Mehmed had three sons Selim, Ahmed and Süleyman, and two daughters by the same mother, and does not name Mahmud. After Mehmed ascended the throne in 1595, the English ambassador Salomón Usque said that Mehmed had six or seven children, and his eldest son was Selim and the second eldest was Süleyman. The Venetian ambassador Francesco Contarini called Mahmud first born in 1602-4, and the English ambassador Henry Lello gives his age between 18 and 19. However, according to Girolamo Cappello, the Venetian bailo in Constantinople between 1595 and 1600, in 1600 said that Ahmed was the oldest surviving son of Mehmed, and that "Memet", most probably Mahmud, is a year younger than Ahmed. According to Agostino Nani, the Venetian bailo between 1600 and 1603, Ahmed was three years elder than Mahmud.

== Bibliography ==
- Ágoston, Gábor; Masters, Bruce Alan (May 1, 2010). Encyclopedia of the Ottoman Empire. Infobase Publishing. ISBN 978-1-438-11025-7.
- Börekçi, Günhan (June 1, 2009). "İnkırâzın Eşiğinde Bir Hanedan: III. Mehmed, I. Ahmed, I. Mustafa ve 17. Yüzyıl Osmanlı Siyasî Krizi". Divan: Disiplinlerarası Çalışmalar Dergisi (in Turkish) (26). Bilim ve Sanat Vakfı: 45–96. ISSN 1309-6834.
- Börekçi, Günhan (2010). Factions and Favorites at the Courts of Sultan Ahmed I (r. 1603-17) and His Immediate Predecessors. Ohio State University.
- Duindam, Jeroen (October 1, 2015). Dynasties: A Global History of Power, 1300–1800. Cambridge University Press. ISBN 978-1-107-06068-5.
- Güzel, Hasan Celâl; Oğuz, Cem; Karatay, Osman (2002). The Turks: Ottomans (2 v. ).
- Michael, Michalis N.; Kappler, Matthias; Gavriel, Eftihios (2009). Archivum Ottomanicum.
- FMR : the Magazine of Franco Maria Ricci - Issues 14-16. Franco Maria Ricci International. 1985.
- Peirce, leslie P. (1993). The Imperial Harem: Women and Sovereignty in the Ottoman Empire. Oxford University Press. ISBN 978-0-195-08677-5.
- Piterberg, Gabriel (September 4, 2003). An Ottoman Tragedy: History and Historiography at Play. University of California Press. ISBN 978-0-520-93005-6.
- Somel, Selcuk Aksin (2010). The A to Z of the Ottoman Empire. Rowman & Littlefield. ISBN 978-0-810-87579-1.
- Tezcan, Baki (2001). Searching For Osman: A Reassessment Of The Deposition Of The Ottoman Sultan Osman II (1618-1622).
- Tezcan, Baki; Barbir, Karl K. (2007). Identity and Identity Formation in the Ottoman World: A Volume of Essays in Honor of Norman Itzkowitz. Center for Turkish Studies at the University of Wisconsin. ISBN 978-0-299-22750-0.
- Tezcan, Baki (September 13, 2010). The Second Ottoman Empire: Political and Social Transformation in the Early Modern World. Cambridge University Press. ISBN 978-0-521-51949-6.
- Walthall, Anne (2008). Servants of the Dynasty: Palace Women in World History. University of California Press. ISBN 978-0-520-25444-2.
