= Dilaver Pasha =

Grand Vizier of the Ottoman Empire from 1621 to 1622

Grand Vizier of the Ottoman Empire
- In office 17 September 1621 – 18 May 1622
- Monarch: Osman II
- Preceded by: Ohrili Hüseyin Pasha
- Succeeded by: Kara Davud Pasha

Personal details
- Born: Constantinople, Ottoman Empire
- Died: 19 May 1622 Constantinople, Ottoman Empire
- Ethnicity: Croat

Dilaver Pasha (Ottoman Turkish: دلاور باشا; Serbo-Croatian: Dilaver-paša; died 19 May 1622) was an Ottoman statesman of Croat descent. He was Grand Vizier of the Ottoman Empire from 1621 to 1622.

== See also ==
- List of Ottoman grand viziers

Political offices
Preceded by Ohrili Hüseyin Pasha	Grand Vizier of the Ottoman Empire; 17 September 1621 – 18 May 1622	Succeeded by Kara Davud Pasha
