= Girolamo Cappello =

Venetian ambassador

Girolamo Cappello (born 13 April 1538) was a Venetian ambassador.

Cappello's first appointment as a Venetian ambassador came in 1567 when he was appointed Ambassador to Austria. From 1570-1573 he was Ambassador to Savoy, then for a short time Ambassador to Poland, and from 1576-1579 he was Ambassador to France. He served in some temporary ambassadorships and then was a member of the council that elected the Doge prior to his appointment as Bailo of Constantinople in 1589.

== Sources ==
- Eric R. Dursteler. "The Bailo in Constantinople: Crisis and Career in Venice’s Early Modern Diplomatic Corps" in Mediterranean Historical Review; Vol. 16 (2001): 1-25.
