= Murat Pasha Mosque, Aksaray =

15th-century Ottoman-era mosque in the Fatih district of Istanbul

Murat Pasha Mosque
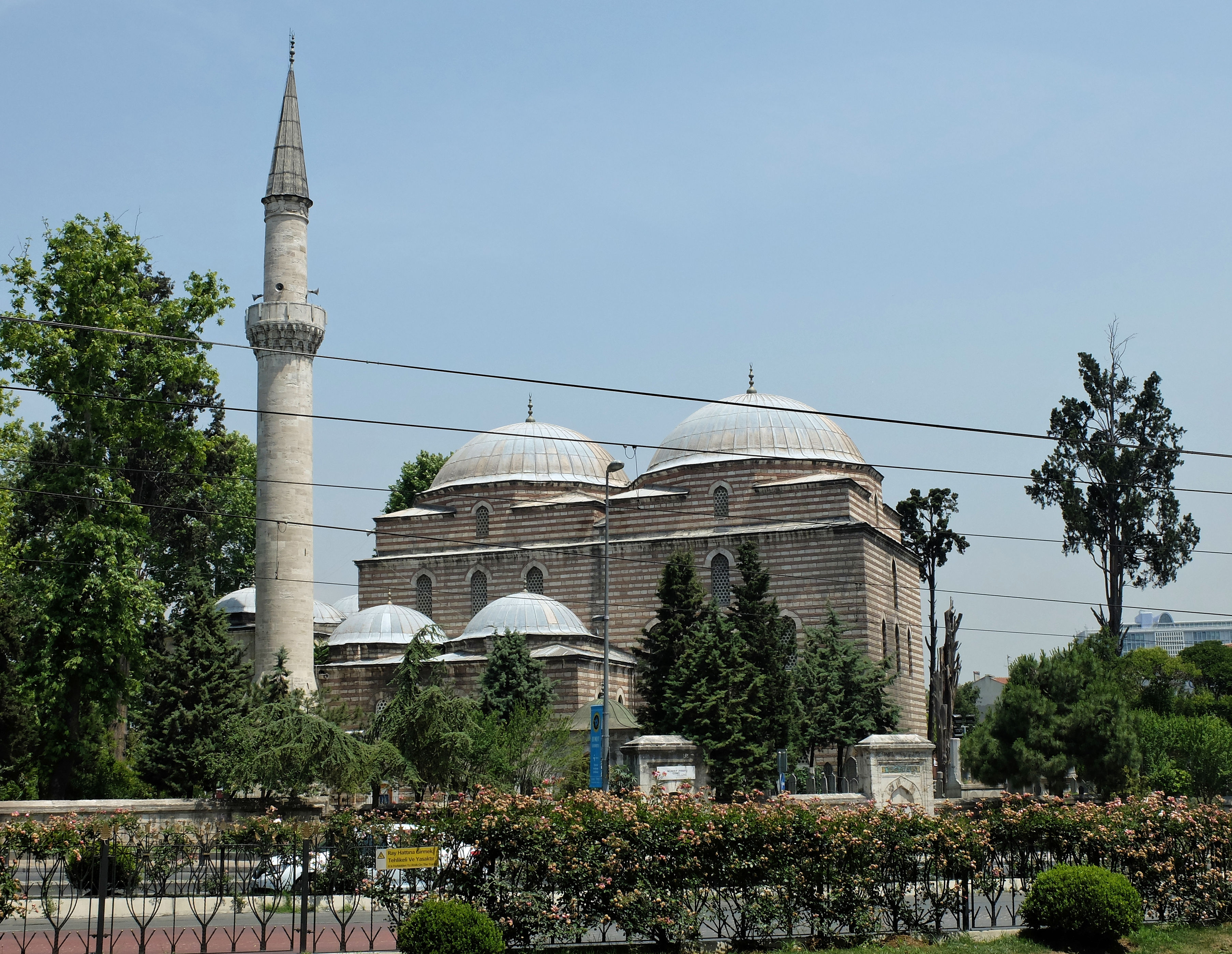

- Location in the Fatih district of Istanbul

Religion
- Affiliation: Islam

Location
- Location: Aksaray, Fatih, Istanbul, Turkey
- Coordinates: 41.010266°N 28.949001°E

Architecture
- Type: Mosque
- Style: Ottoman architecture
- Groundbreaking: 1465
- Completed: 1471

Specifications
- Minaret: 1
- Materials: brick, stone

The Murat Pasha Mosque (Turkish: Murat Paşa Camii) is a 15th century Ottoman mosque squeezed in between two busy roads linking Aksaray and Yusufpaşa in the Fatih district of Istanbul, Turkey.

== Architecture ==
The mosque was commissioned in 1465-66 by Hass Murad Pasha (mod. Turkish Has Murat Paşa) and completed after his death by his brother Mesih Pasha, who was buried here.

The mosque is designed in the early Ottoman style perfected in Bursa. The main space is a 2 × 1 rectangle covered by two identical domes, each 21 m (69 ft) high and 10.5 m (34 ft) in diameter. The mihrab and minbar are on the short side of the rectangle. The main space is approached via a narthex rather like those in Byzantine churches. This is preceded by a portico.

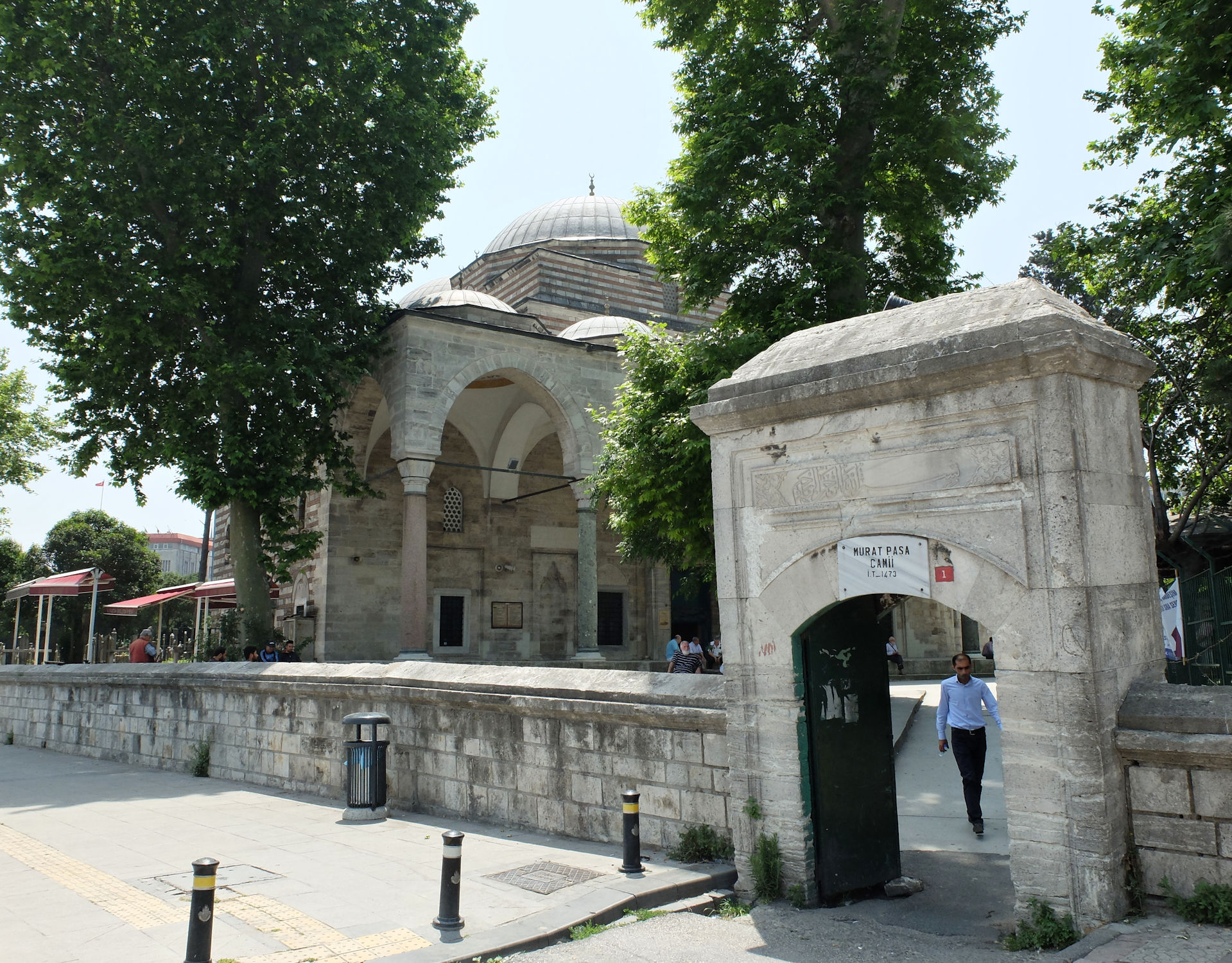
Entrance to the grounds of the mosque

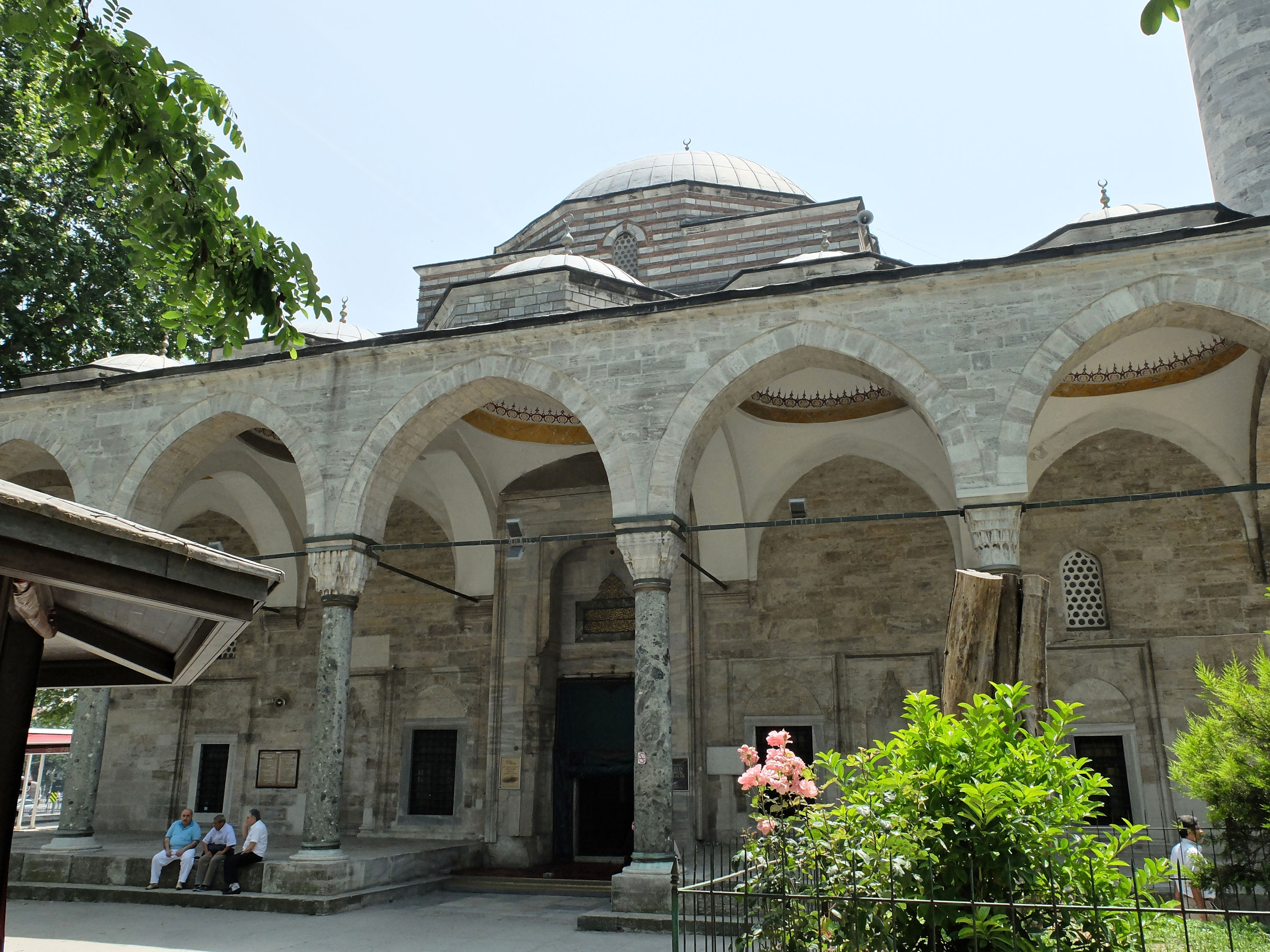
The front facade of the mosque

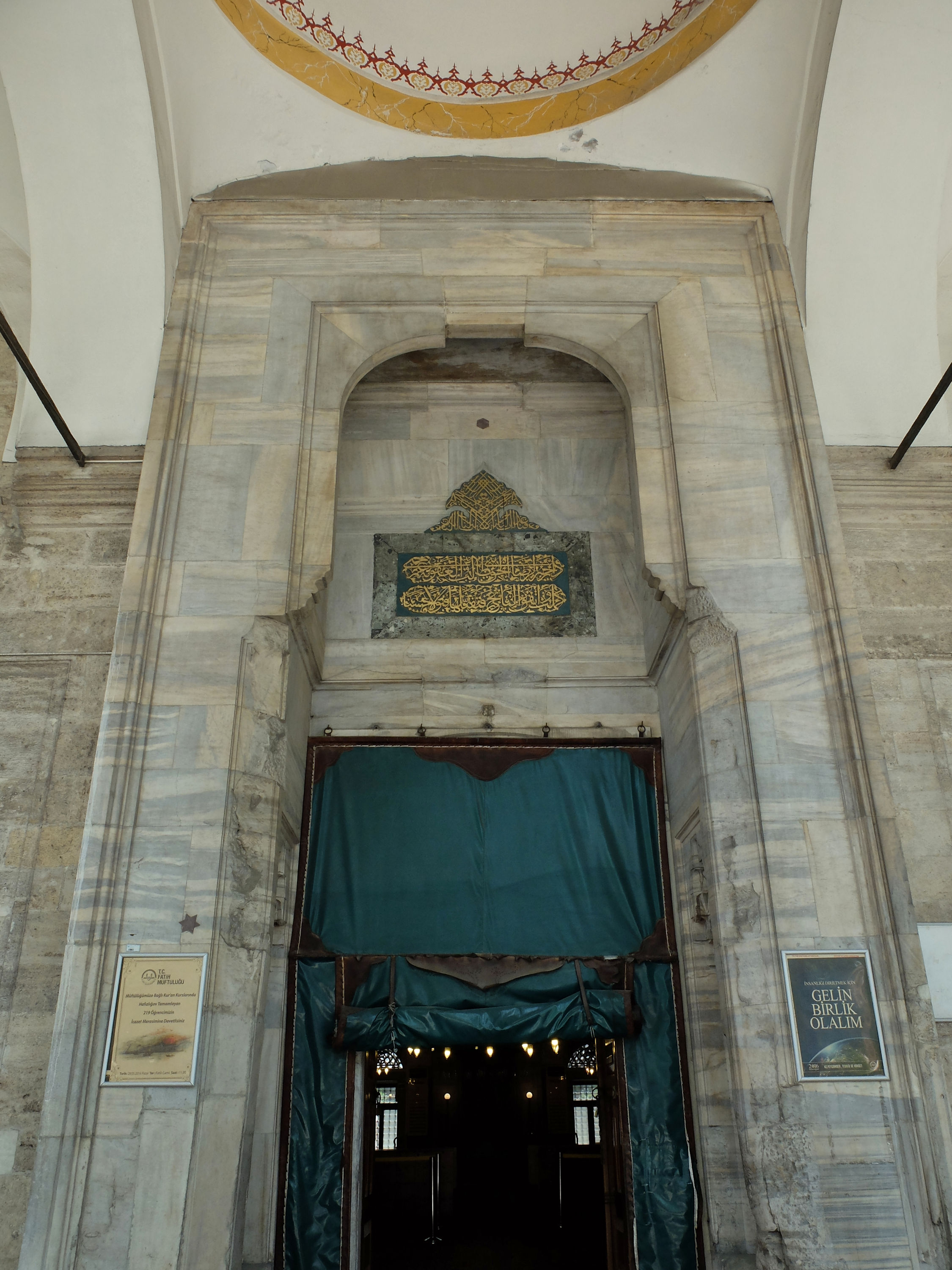
The entrance portal of the mosque

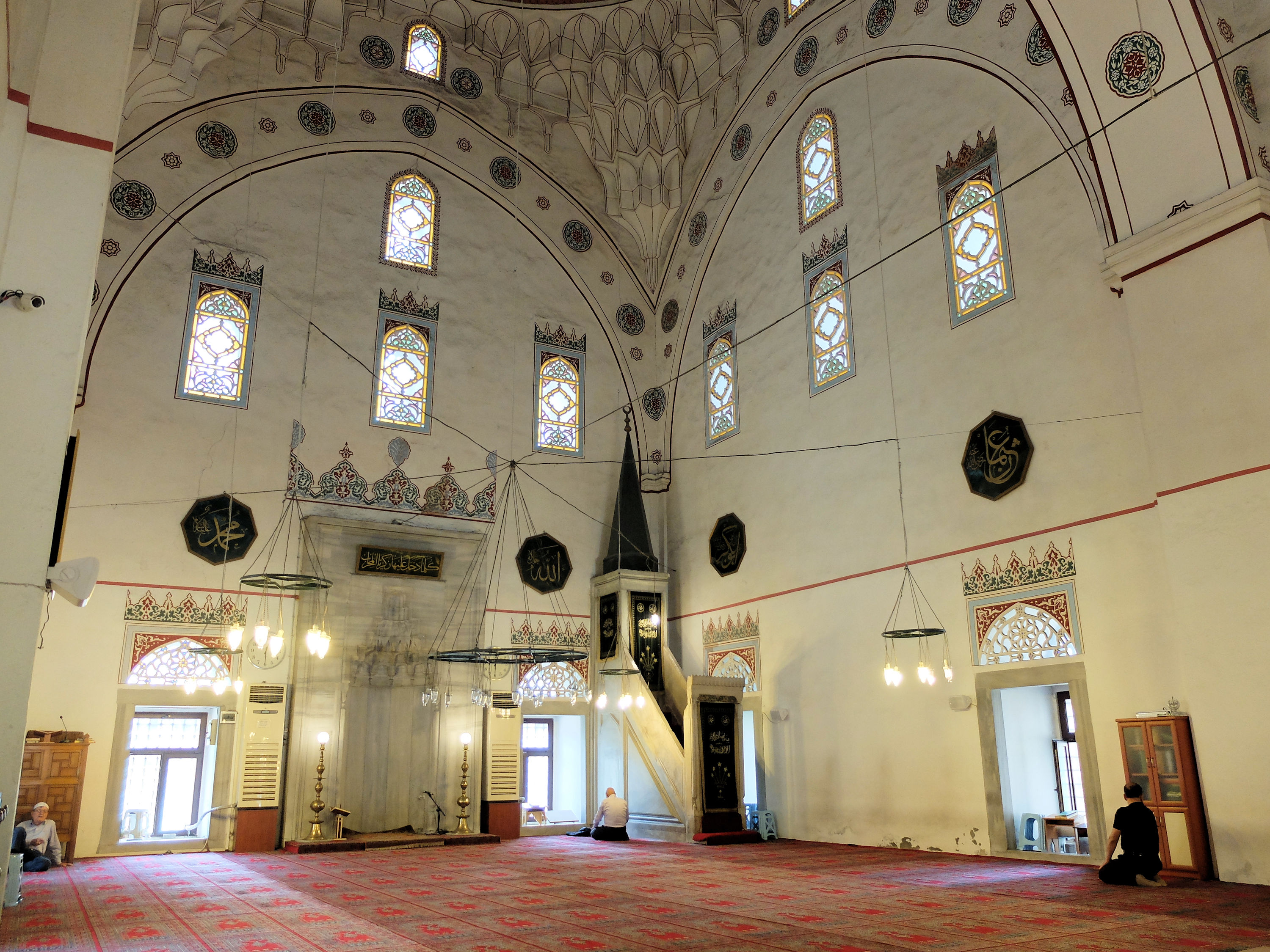
Interior of the mosque, near the mihrab and minbar

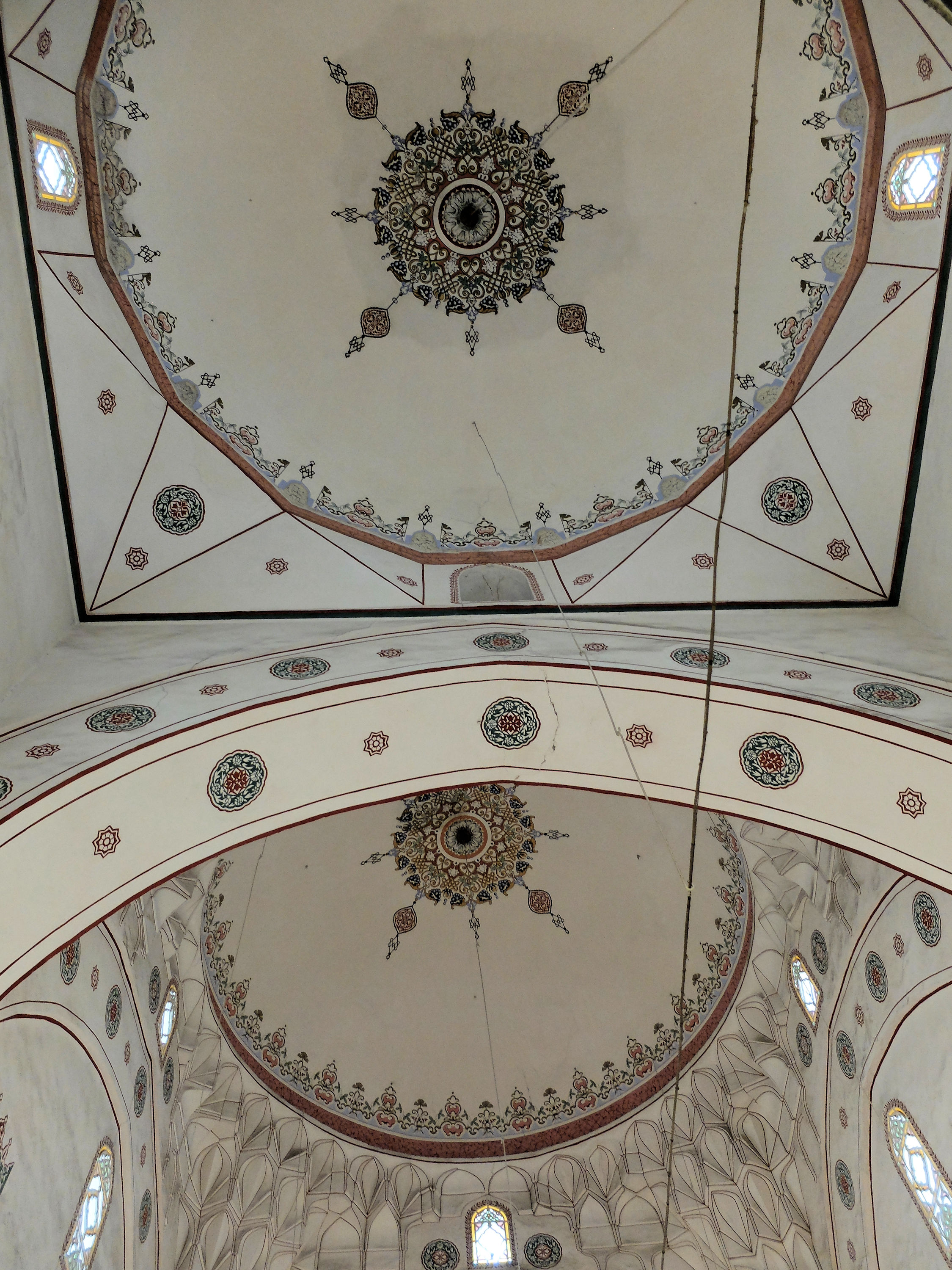
Interior of the two main domes of the mosque

== See also ==
- List of mosques
- Ottoman architecture

== Sources ==
- Babinger, Franz (1952). "Eine Verfügung des Paläologen Chass Murad-Pasa von Mitte Regeb 876 = Dez./Jan. 1471-72". Documenta Islamica Inedita (PDF) (in German). Berlin: Akademie-Verlag. pp. 197–210.
- Stavrides, Théoharis (2001). The Sultan of Vezirs: The Life and Times of the Ottoman Grand Vezir Mahmud Pasha Angelović (1453–1474). Brill. ISBN 978-90-04-12106-5.
