= Siege of Kanizsa (1601) =

1601 battle of the Long War

Siege of Nagykanizsa
- Part of the Long War; Ottoman–Habsburg wars (1593 – 1606)
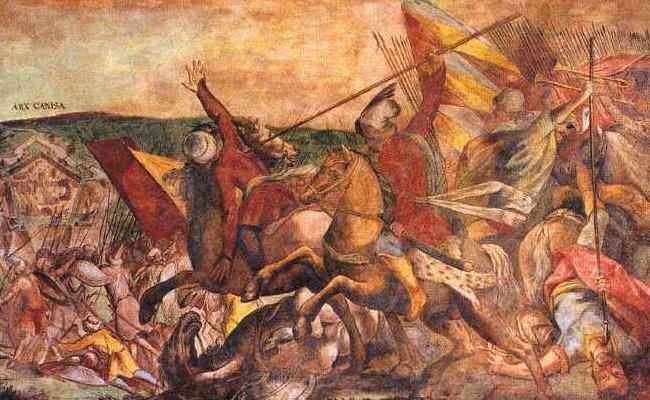
Date	9 September 1601 – 18 November 1601
Location	Nagykanizsa, Ottoman Empire
Result	Ottoman victory

Belligerents
Ottoman Empire	Habsburg Austria; Holy Roman Empire; Kingdom of Hungary; Kingdom of Croatia; Papal States; Knights of Malta

Commanders and leaders
Tiryaki Hasan Pasha	Archduke Ferdinand

Strength
6,000 Sipahi; 3,000 Janissary; 100 small cannons	35,000–60,000; 40+ cannons

Casualties and losses
Unknown	More than 30,000 killed 6,000 sick and wounded

During the siege of Nagykanizsa (Turkish: Kanije Savunması, lit. 'The Defence of Kanizsa') in 1601, a small Ottoman force held the fortress of Naģykanizsa in western Hungary against a much larger coalition army of the Habsburg monarchy, while inflicting heavy losses on its besiegers.

This battle was part of the Long War between the Ottoman Empire and the House of Habsburg, lasting from 1593 to 1606.

== Background ==
The April 21, 1521 gift from Holy Roman Emperor Charles V to his brother, Ferdinand I, of his Austrian territories created a Spanish branch of the Habsburgs as well as an Austrian branch who held the kingdoms of Bohemia and Hungary and also the title of Holy Roman Emperor after the death of Charles in 1558.

The decisive defeat by Suleiman the Magnificent of King Louis II of Hungary and Bohemia at the Battle of Mohács in 1526 brought about the fall of the Jagiellon dynasty. Louis, the adopted son of Maximilian I, Holy Roman Emperor, was killed in this battle and died childless at nineteen. Rival kings ruled for a time during the civil war that followed. John Zápolya (Hungarian:János Szapolyai) had not participated in Mohács and therefore was the only Hungarian aristocrat left with an army. The rival claimant was Louis' brother-in-law, Ferdinand I.

After the Ottoman capture in 1541 of central Buda, which eventually merged with nearby Pest to become Budapest, the Kingdom of Hungary broke in three. Royal Hungary in the west came under Habsburg control and the Principality of Transylvania, or Eastern Hungarian Kingdom, became an Ottoman vassal state under János and later his son, who fled to Lippa with his mother after the fall of Buda.

A period known as the fortress wars began. The Habsburgs built 100–120 forts they called the Bastion of Christianity, with the most important at Croatia, Slavonia, Kanizsa, Győr, Bányavidék, and Upper Hungary. A fleet of sloops based in Komárom defended the Danube. The Ottomans also had 100–130 fortresses, at Buda-Pest, Esztergom, and Temesvár.

=== Long war ===
After 1597, initial Ottoman victory looked more like stalemate. The imperial army took Győr in 1598 and Székesfehérvár in 1601; the Ottoman army took Nagykanizsa in 1600 and Székesfehérvárin in 1602.

Ottoman tacticians complained that they were outgunned, but they were also better organized. When the war turned into the Bocskai revolt in 1604, both parties welcomed the 1606 Zsitvatorok peace, weary of destruction and the toll on their treasuries.

=== Prelude ===
Nagykanizsa fell to Tiryaki Hasan Pasha in 1600, and the Ottoman Pasha took command of the fort with a garrison of 7,000 men. The captured town became the capital of Kanije Eyalet, an administrative unit of the Ottoman Empire that lasted until the empire's collapse at the end of the century. Kanije Eyalet combined the territory around Nagykanizsa with Zigetvar Eyalet, established in 1596 from parts of Bosnia and another province. This new Ottoman province was only twenty miles from the Austrian duchy of Styria and "caused consternation at the imperial court and at the Holy See." Clement VIII decreed a third invasion of Hungary, this time under his nephew Gian Francesco Aldobrandini. Aldobrandini would die during the siege and later be buried in the Saint Maria sopra Minerva in Rome.

== Aftermath ==
Tiryaki Hasan Pasha was promoted to beylerbey (high governor) of Bosnia,

Tiryaki Hasan Pasha was in charge of Hungarian provinces for ten years until his death. Sultan Mehmed III died in 1603.
