= Hezarpare Ahmed Pasha =

Grand Vizier of the Ottoman Empire from 1647 to 1648

Tezkereci • Hezarpare (posthumously) Ahmed Pasha

Grand Vizier of the Ottoman Empire
- In office 21 September 1647 – 8 August 1648
- Monarch: Ibrahim
- Preceded by: Kara Musa Pasha
- Succeeded by: Sofu Mehmed Pasha

Defterdar
- In office 1646–1647
- Preceded by: Nevesinli Salih Pasha
- Succeeded by: Halıcızade Mehmed Pasha

Personal details
- Died: 8 August 1648 Istanbul, Ottoman Empire
- Spouse(s): Fülane Hatun; Beyhan Sultan
- Children: First marriage Baki Bey

Tezkereci Ahmed Pasha (died 8 August 1648), better known as Hezarpare Ahmed Pasha after his death, was an Ottoman grand vizier and defterdar (finance minister).

== Early life ==
Ahmed was a son of a professional soldier. Instead of following his father's footsteps into the military, he chose to go into bureaucracy. He was appointed to several posts, one of which was the personal secretary (tezkereci) of the grand vizier Kemankeş Mustafa Pasha, gaining the epithet tezkereci after this appointment. In 1646, two years after Mustafa Pasha's execution, he was appointed as the defterdar, and in 1647, he was promoted to the rank of grand vizier, the highest post in Ottoman bureaucracy.

== Grand Vizierate ==
Sultan Ibrahim (sometimes called Ibrahim the Mad) was a rather unbalanced sultan. He was a connoisseur of sable skin coats and forced his grand vizier to buy huge quantities of sable skin for his palaces. Because of this, Ahmed Pasha was required to concentrate more of his time on the sable trade rather than on state affairs. During his term, the Venetian navy blocked the strait of Çanakkale (Dardanelles), and Venice also seized control of the important fort of Klis (in modern Croatia); see Cretan War (1645-1669). Moreover, largescale sable skin purchases caused an extra deficit in a budget already under strain due to the pressure of the war.

== Death ==
In 1648, Ahmed Pasha levied a heavy tax to meet the heavy expenditures of the budget. However, this step caused anger and rebellion among the populace of the Ottoman Empire. He was lynched on 8 August 1648, and his body was cut into many pieces by the angry mob. The epithet Hezarpare is a Persian epithet he gained after his death, meaning "thousand pieces," referring to the fate of his corpse after his lynching. On the same day, Ibrahim was seized and imprisoned in Topkapı Palace. He was executed a few days after Ahmed Pasha's murder.

== See also ==
- List of Ottoman grand viziers
- List of Ottoman ministers of finance

Political offices
Preceded by Nevesinli Salih Pasha	Defterdar; 1646–1647	Succeeded by Halıcızade Mehmed Pasha
Preceded by Kara Musa Pasha	Grand Vizier of the Ottoman Empire; 21 September 1647 – 7 August 1648	Succeeded by Sofu Mehmed Pasha
