= List of Kapudan Pashas =

List of Ottoman admirals

The Kapudan Pasha (Ottoman Turkish: قپودان پاشا, Modern Turkish: Kaptan Paşa), also known in Turkish as Kaptan-ı Derya ("Captain of the Seas"), was the commander-in-chief of the navy of the Ottoman Empire. Around 160 captains served between the establishment of the post under Bayezid I and the office's replacement by the more modern Ottoman Ministry of the Navy (Bahriye Nazırlığı) during the Tanzimat reforms.

The title of Kapudan Pasha itself is only attested from 1567 onwards; earlier designations for the supreme commander of the fleet include derya begi ("beg of the sea") and re'is kapudan ("head captain").

Name	Appointed	Vacated	Notes
Kara Mürsel Bey	1324		
Saruca Pasha	1390		Turk
Çavlı Bey		1412	Turk
Suleiman Baltoghlu	1451	1453	Bulgarian?
Hamza Bey	1453	1456	Albanian
Has Yunus Bey	1456	1459	
Kasım Bey	1459	1460	
Kadim İsmail Bey	1461	1462	Devşirme?
Yakub Bey	1462	1463	Albanian
Zagan Pasha	1463	1466	Albanian, Greek or Serb; previously grand vizier.
Veli Mahmud Pasha	1466	1478	Serb, Devşirme; later grand vizier.
Gedik Ahmed Pasha	1478	1480	Serb, Devşirme; invaded Mediterranean and seized Santa Maura, Kefalonia, and Zante; later grand vizier.
Mesih Pasha	1480	1491	Greek, converted member of the Palaiologoi; later grand vizier.
Güveği Sinan Pasha	1491	1492	Albanian, Devşirme, founder of Vlora dynasty of Albanian generals and politicians.
Kara Nişancı Davud	1492	1503	Devşirme?
Küçük Davud Pasha	1503	1506	
Hersekzade Ahmed Pasha	1506	1511	Slav; later grand vizier.
İskender Ağa Pasha	1511	1514	Devşirme?
Sinan Bey	1514	1516	Devşirme?
Frenk Cafer Ağa Pasha	1516	1520	Devşirme
Parlak Mustafa Pasha	1520	1522	Bosniak
Bayram Pasha	1522		
Kurdoğlu Muslihiddin Reis			
Süleyman Pasha		1531	
Kemankeş Ahmed Bey	1531	1533	Devşirme?
Hayreddin Barbarossa	1533	1546	Albanian or Turk; position raised to beylerbey, granted Eyalets of the Islands of the Mediterranean and Ottoman Algeria.
Sokollu Mehmed Pasha	1546	1550	Serb, Devşirme; invaded Libya; later grand vizier.
Sinan Pasha	1550	1554	Croat; supported Turgut Reis's western raids; later grand vizier.
Piali Pasha	1554	1567	Held the title of Kapudan Beg. Hungarian or Croatian. (Note: According to Conflict and Conquest in the Islamic World: A Historical Encyclopedia, Piyale Pasha was of Croat origin, but born in Hungary. According to an entry in the TDV Islam Encyclopedia, he was the son of a Croatian shoemaker from Torna, Hungary. According to the majority of Western scholars, he was of Hungarian roots, the son of a Hungarian shoemaker from Torna.) captured Corsica with the French in 1554, defeated Spanish at Piombino in 1555, raided Calabria, Salerno, Tuscany, Spain, and seized the Balearics in 1558, won crushing Battle of Djerba in 1560; captured Naples in 1563.
Müezzinzade Ali Pasha	1567	7 October 1571	First to hold the title of Kapudan Pasha. Effected conquest of Cyprus from Venice, but killed at Lepanto.
Hasan Pasha (son of Barbarossa)	1567	1572	Born in Algiers in 1517. He was called to Constantinople and named Kapudan Pasha (Commander-in-Chief) of the Ottoman Navy in 1567, like his father before him. Hasan Pasha was at the Great Siege of Malta in 1565, and Battle of Lepanto in 1571. He died in Constantinople in 1572.
Kılıç Ali Paşa	1571	21 June 1587	Italian, born Giovanni Dionigi Galeni, known after conversion as Uluç and Uluç Ali Reis; rebuilt Turkish fleet, recaptured Tunis from Don Juan and ended War of Cyprus, raided Calabria and put down numerous revolts.
Uluç Hasan Paşa	1588	1591	Italian, born Andrea Celeste, also known as Hassan Veneziano, served as Beylerbey of Algiers through the patronage of former master Uluç Ali between 1577 to 1580, then from 1582 to 1587; he was Kapudan Pasha from 1588 until his death in July 1591. Hasan owned Miguel de Cervantes as a slave during part of his captivity in Algiers from 1575 to 1580.
Cigalazade Yusuf Sinan Pasha	1591	1595	Italian, born Scipione Cicala; first term; later grand vizier.
Cigalazade Yusuf Sinan Pasha	1599	1604	Second term; previously grand vizier.
Derviş Pasha	1604		Bosnian Serb
Güzelce Ali Pasha	1617	?	Turk
Cataldjali Hasan Pasha	1625	1631	
Gazi Hüseyin Pasha	1632	1635	Turk; later grand vizier.
Kemankeş Mustafa Pasha	17 October 1635	24 December 1638	Albanian, later grand vizier.
Gazi Hüseyin Pasha	1639	1641	Turk
Yusuf Pasha	164X	164X	Dalmatian Slav; executed by Sultan.
Koca Musa Pasha	1645	1647	Bosniak; died at Kandiye during Cretan War before he could receive his promotion to grand vizier.
Kara Musa Pasha	1647	21 September 1647	
Kılavuz Köse Ali Pasha	1647	1648	
Koca Dervish Mehmed Pasha	1652	1653	Circassian; later grand vizier.
Kara Murad Pasha	1653	11 May 1655	Albanian; effected the breakout First Battle of the Dardanelles during the Cretan War; prior and later grand vizier.
Merzifonlu Kara Mustafa Pasha	1666	1670	Turk; later grand vizier.
Bozoklu Mustafa Pasha	1680	1684	Later grand vizier.
Mezzo Morto Hüseyin Pasha	1695	1701	Turk or Aragonese; commanded at Andros in 1696 during the Morean War, attempted moderate reforms and published the Kannunname.
Baltacı Mehmet Pasha	1704	1704	Turk; later grand vizier.
Veli Mehmed Pasha	1706	1707	Turk
Moralı Ibrahim Pasha	November 1707	1709	
Küçük Ali Pasazade Mehmed Pasha	1709	1711	Turk
Canım Hoca Mehmed Pasha	December 1714	February 1717	Turk from Koroni, former galley slave in the Venetian fleet. Led the Ottoman navy in the Ottoman–Venetian War (1714–18); first term.
Moralı Ibrahim Pasha	1717	1718	Defeated in the Battle of Matapan.
Süleyman Pasha	April 5, 1718	1721	
Kaymak Mustafa Pasha	1721	1730	Bosniak
Canım Hoca Mehmed Pasha	1730	1730	Second term, lasted for only a few days.
Hacı Hüseyin Pasha	1732	1732	
Koca Bekir Pasha	1732	1732	Turk; first term.
Canım Hoca Mehmed Pasha	1732	1736	Third term.
Hacı Mehmed Pasha			c. 1735. Turk?
Hatibzade Yahya Pasha	1743	1743	
Râtip Ahmed Pasha	1743	1744	Turk
Koca Bekir Pasha	1750	1753	Turk; second term.
Macar Hacı Hasan Pasha	February 1761	December 1761	
Ahıskalı Mehmed Pasha	December 1761	August 1762	
Eğribozlu İbrahim Pasha		1769	Turk?
Mandalzade Hüsameddin Pasha	1770	1770	Removed following the disastrous naval defeat at Chesma during the Russo-Turkish War of 1768–1774.
Cezayirli Gazi Hasan Pasha	1770	1789 or 1790	Georgian; dislodged Russians from Aegean, commanded forces during the Russo-Turkish Wars of 1768–1774 and 1787–1792; later grand vizier.
Koca Yusuf Pasha	19 December 1789		Georgian; former grand vizier.
Giritli Hüseyin Pasha	1789	1792	
Küçük Hüseyin Pasha	11 March 1792	7 December 1803	Georgian; commanded the Turkish invasion fleet of French-occupied Egypt.
Mehmed Kadri Pasha	1803	1804	
Hafız İsmail Pasha	1804	1805	Later grand vizier.
Hacı Salih Pasha	1805	1805	Turk; later grand vizier.
Hacı Mehmed Pasha II	21 November 1806	1808	Turk
Seydi Ali Pasha	1807 or 1808	1808	Georgian
Abdullah Ramiz Efendi	1808	1808	Crimean Tatar
Koca Hüsrev Mehmed Pasha	1811	1818	Abazin; later grand vizier.
Deli Abdullah Pasha		1821	Turk; later grand vizier.
Nasuhzade Ali Pasha	1821	7 June 1822	Albanian; also known as Kara-Ali Pasha; commanded Turkish fleet during the Greek War of Independence: directed Massacre of Samothrace, killed by fireship directed by Konstantinos Kanaris following Massacre of Chios; ancestor of Turkish author Nasuh Mahruki.
Kara Mehmet	1822		
Koca Hüsrev Mehmed Pasha	December 1822	1826	
Aghan Ephrikian Pasha	1828		Probably Armenian; Governor
Damat Gürcü Halil Rifat Pasha	1830	1832	
Çengeloğlu Tahir Mehmed Pasha	November 1832	1836	Turk
Ahmed Fevzi Pasha	10 November 1836	1839	Greek, defected to Egypt.
Topal İzzet Pasha	1840		Reformer
Damat Gürcü Halil Rifat Pasha	1843	1845	
Damat Gürcü Halil Rifat Pasha	1847	1848	
unknown			Lost administrative control of the Eyalet of the Islands c. 1848.
Mahmud Pasha	1853	1854	
Damat Gürcü Halil Rifat Pasha	1854	1855	
Damat Mehmed Ali Pasha		13 March 1867	Office abolished.

== See also ==
- List of fleet commanders of the Ottoman Navy, for the Kapudan Pasha's replacements after 1877
- List of Ottoman admirals, for Turkish commanders beneath the rank of the Kapudan Pashas
