= Kara Murat Pasha =

Grand Vizier of the Ottoman Empire 1649–1650, 1655)

Kara Dev Murat Pasha

Grand Vizier of the Ottoman Empire
- In office 11 May 1655 – 19 August 1655
- Monarch: Mehmed IV
- Preceded by: Ibşir Mustafa Pasha
- Succeeded by: Ermeni Süleyman Pasha
- In office 21 May 1649 – 5 August 1650
- Monarch: Mehmed IV
- Preceded by: Sofu Mehmed Pasha
- Succeeded by: Melek Ahmed Pasha

Ottoman Governor of Damascus
- In office 1655–1655
- Preceded by: Defterzade Mehmed Pasha
- Succeeded by: Haseki Mehmed Pasha

Personal details
- Born: 1595
- Died: 1655 (aged 59–60) Hama, Ottoman Syria

Military service
- Allegiance: Ottoman Empire
- Branch/service: Ottoman Navy; Ottoman Army
- Rank: Kapudan Pasha (grand admiral; 1653–55); Janissary agha (1648–49)
- Battles/wars: Cretan War (1645–1669): Battle of the Dardanelles (1654)

Kara Murat Pasha, or Kara Dev Murad Pasha, lit. Courageous Giant Murat Pasha in Ottoman Turkish; (1595 – 1655), was an Ottoman Albanian statesman and military officer. He served as Kapudan Pasha and twice as Grand Vizier. His epithet Kara ("black") refers to his courage and Dev ("giant") to his physical size.

== Early years ==
Murat was of Albanian origin. He distinguished himself in the early phases of Cretan War between the Ottoman Empire and the Republic of Venice. He was assigned to various posts in the Janissary corps (the professional regiments that formed the core of the Ottoman army), and in 1648, during the enthronement of Mehmed IV, he was promoted to be commander of the Janissary corps (Turkish: Yeniçeri ağası). When the Ottoman Navy was defeated by the Venetians in the Battle of Focchies on 12 May 1649, the Grand Vizier Sofu Mehmed Pasha was blamed for the defeat, and he was replaced by Kara Murat Pasha on 21 May. Murat had Sofu Mehmed Pasha exiled and then executed.

== First term as Grand Vizier ==
At the time of Murat's appointment as Grand Vizier, the sultan was only seven years old and the two Valide sultans (his mother Turhan Hatice and grandmother Kösem), who were acting as regents, were locked in a power struggle. While Kösem supported Murat, Turhan Hatice was against him. Moreover, the leaders of the Janissaries, Murat's former colleagues, were also against him. Feeling that his life was in danger, Murat resigned on 5 August 1650. Upon his suggestion, he was succeeded by Melek Ahmed Pasha.

After his resignation, Murat was appointed as the governor of Budin (modern Budapest, Hungary). In 1653, he returned to Constantinople and was appointed Kapudan Pasha (grand admiral) and tasked with transporting reinforcements and ammunition to Crete by sea. The Venetian navy was blockading the Dardanelles Strait at the time, but Murat managed to defeat the Venetians and break their blockade in the First Battle of the Dardanelles.

== Second term as Grand Vizier and death ==
Murat Pasha was reappointed as the Grand Vizier on 11 May 1655. His second term was very short; due to economic problems as well as opposition from the Janissaries, he had to resign on 19 August 1655. He was then appointed to the governorship of the Damascus Eyalet in Syria, but along the way to take up the post, he fell ill and died. In the five years between his two terms as Grand Vizier, six different pashas were appointed to the office, an indication of the political instability of the empire in the mid-17th century.

== See also ==
- List of Ottoman grand viziers
- List of Ottoman governors of Damascus

Political offices
Preceded by Sofu Mehmed Pasha	Grand Vizier of the Ottoman Empire; 21 May 1649 – 5 August 1650	Succeeded by Melek Ahmed Pasha
Preceded by Ibşir Mustafa Pasha	Grand Vizier of the Ottoman Empire; 11 May 1655 – 19 August 1655	Succeeded by Ermeni Süleyman Pasha
Preceded by Defterzade Mehmed Pasha	Ottoman Governor of Damascus; 1655	Succeeded by Haseki Mehmed Pasha
Military offices
Preceded by Koca Dervish Mehmed Pasha	Kapudan Pasha; 1653–11 May 1655	Succeeded by Dellak Mustafa Pasha
