= Siege of Azov (1637–1642) =

Series of conflicts

- Part of the Cossack raids and Crimean–Nogai Raids
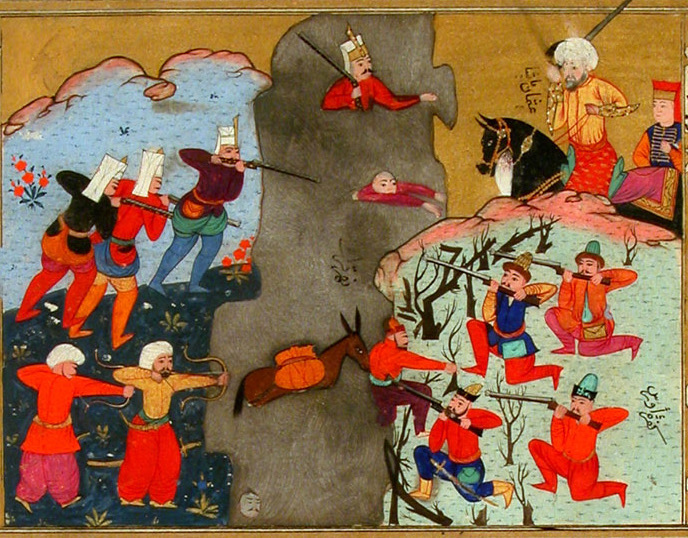
- Late 16th-century Ottoman miniature depicting janissaries and azaps fighting against Cossacks on the Terek
Date	21 April 1637 – 30 April 1642
Location	Azov, Ottoman Empire (Present-day Russia)
Result	Ottoman victory
Territorial changes	Cossacks capture Azov in 1637; Failed Ottoman siege attempt in 1641; Ottomans recapture Azov in 1642

Belligerents
Don Cossacks; Zaporozhian Cossacks; Circassians (1637)	Ottoman Empire; Crimean Khanate

Commanders and leaders
1637: Ivan Katorzhnyi; Mikhail Tatarinov; Pavlo Pavliuk; 1641: Unknown	1637: Unknown; 1641: (Ottoman Empire) Commander of Ochakiv Hüseyin Pasha "The Blonde" (Ottoman Empire) Grand Admiral Siyavuş Pasha "The Abaza" (Ottoman Empire) Governor of Kaffa Yusuf Pasha; Janissary Kethüda Haydar Ağazade; Bahadır I Giray

Strength
1637: 7,000; 4 light cannons 1641: 30,000+: 5,300 garrisoned 300 guns; 15,000 relief force (Note: 10,000 from land, 5,000+ from sea)	1637: 4,000, distributed among three forts 1641: 70,000 total (including non-combatants and sailors): 2,000 muskets; 5,000 bows; 6,000 polearms; 7,000 swords; 5,000 hand grenades; 2,000 shields; 40,000 arrows

Casualties and losses
1637: 1,000 + killed 2,000 wounded (Russian claim); 1641: 7,000 killed in total: 4,000 killed or captured in the Azov sea (relief force); 3,000 killed in the Azov fortress (garrison)	1637: Garrison capitulated 1641: 1,658 killed or wounded in total: 458 Janissaries killed

The Azov campaigns of 1637 and 1641, in Russian historiography known as Azov sitting (Russian: Азовское сидение, romanized: Azovskoe sidenie), were a series of conflicts over the control of Azov fortress between Don–Zaporozhian Cossacks and Ottoman–Crimean forces from 21 April 1637 to 30 April 1642.

== Azov Campaigns ==
=== Cossack Campaign 1637 ===
In April 1637, a force of 3,000 Don Cossacks and 4,000 Zaporozhian Cossacks under Mikhail Tatarinov placed Azov under siege. On 5 June the Don Cossacks captured the sultan's envoy Foma Cantacuzene en route from Azov to the upper Don and executed him for espionage. On 18 June Tatarinov's forces breached most of Azov's outer defenses after a German mercenary instructed them in placing a mine beneath its walls; the remaining Ottoman troops made a last stand in Azov's keep but had to capitulate three days later. Tatarinov and Katorzhnyi moved quickly to garrison Azov with several thousand cossacks and on 15 July they sent a delegation to Moscow to beg the Tsar Mikhail to place Azov under his protection and send them reinforcements.

Moscow sent a commission to Azov to determine whether this was worth the risk. It found Azov's fortifications and stores in deplorable state and calculated it would cost about 120,000 rubles a year to adequately reinforce Azov, about ten times as much as the cost of the average annual Don Shipment. It was therefore decided to send some grain and munitions to the Host but refuse its request for troops. Moscow recognized that any more overt association with the Don Cossacks' actions would give the sultan pretext for war upon Muscovy. A rescript was sent to the Host condemning them for the murder of Cantacuzene and a letter sent to the sultan insisting the tsar's government had not been complicit in the events at Azov, which had been the work of "brigands ... acting for reasons unknown ... without Our instruction."

The crisis could not be quickly defused, for the cossacks were able to reinforce and hold Azov for the next five years: Murat IV's war in Persia and then his death in 1640 delayed plans for an Ottoman expedition to retake Azov, and Crimean Khan Bahadır Giray did not launch any campaigns against Azov in this period because of his lack of experience besieging stone fortresses and his lack of cannons and gunpowder weapons. Meanwhile merchants out of Don and Volga towns found it profitable to provision the cossack garrison at Azov, which by spring 1641 numbered 5,300 men and 300 guns.

=== Ottoman campaign 1641 ===
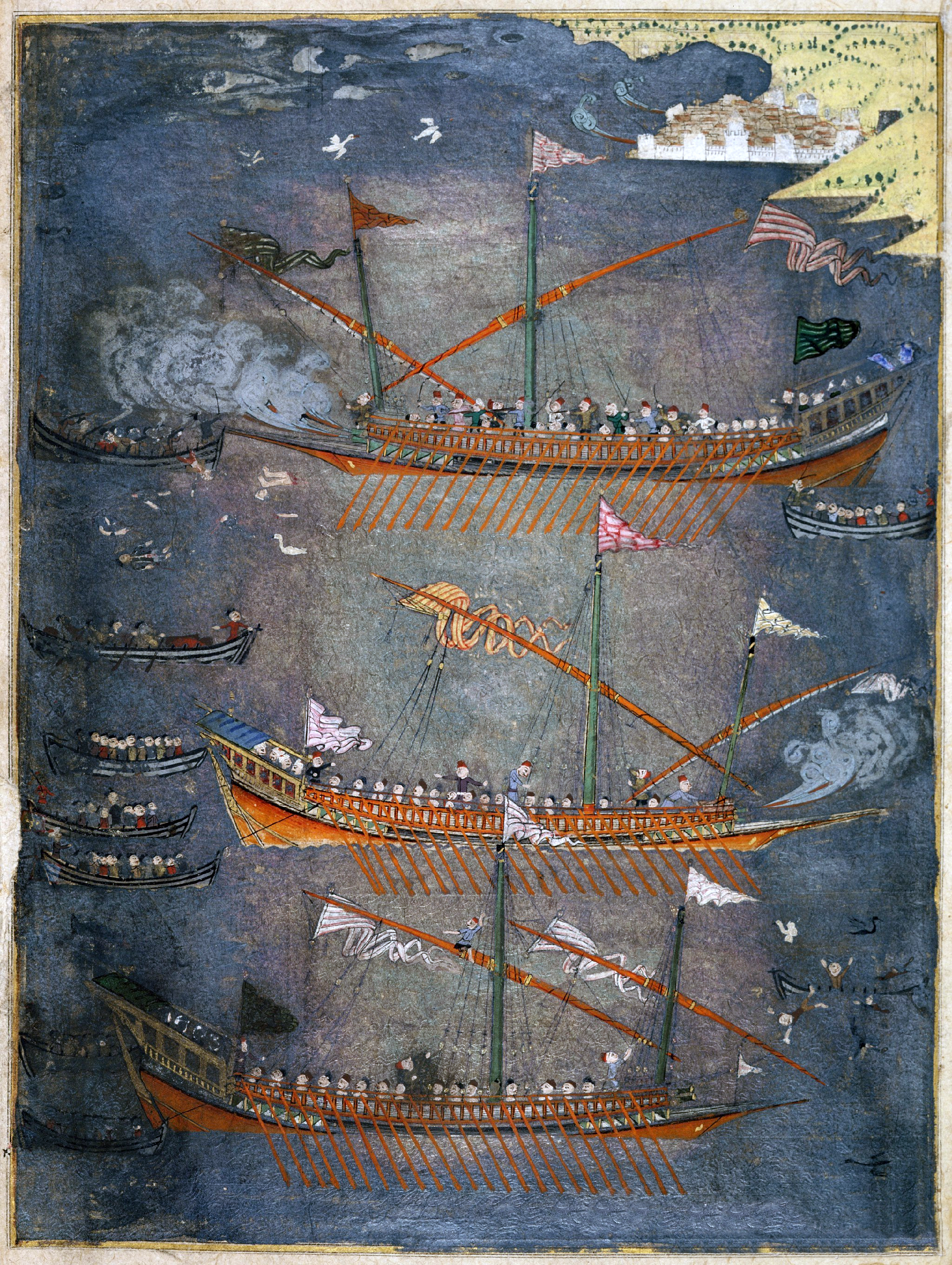
The Turkish fleet repels the attack of the Cossacks.

In May of 1641, Sultan Ibrahim sent an army of 70,000 people, including sailors and non-combatants, under the command of Blonde Hüseyin Pasha for recapture of Azov. Under his command the Silistra provincial military forces; Kapudan Siyavuş Pasha, janissary kethüda (2nd in command) Haydar Ağazâde, Crimean Khan Bahadır I Giray and the Kefe Governor Yusuf Pasha and their military units.

Together with the fleet, they sailed out into the Black Sea and went to retake the Azov Fortress. The fleet under the command of Kapudan (Grand Admiral) Siyavuş Pasha passed by Taman Fortress and put in at Balısıra Harbor. Because the sea beyond this harbor was too shallow for the galleys and chaika boats to approach Azov, all of the ordnance and light munitions had to be carried to Azov by cart instead. The Turkish troops then entered the trenches before Azov Fortress and laid siege to it. After the siege began, large numbers of provincial troops (sipahis and sekbans) arrived from the Anatolia help.

At the start of 1641 there were roughly 1,000 Cossacks in Azov. When the Cossacks had first captured Azov, 700 Zaporozhians had garrisoned it; then in 1640, as the Cossacks prepared for the possibility of a siege and needed reinforcements, another 500 Zaporozhian arrived to help. Even then the garrison was not large enough for the defense.

By order of the Cossack military council, Cossacks began gathering at the fortress from every nearby town that spring, and by the day the Ottoman troops appeared, more than 5,000 Cossacks and 800 women had assembled at Azov. The Cossack women took an active part in the fortress's defense alongside the men. There were also some Cossacks who did not want to take part in the defense; some refused to go to the besieged Azov, saying "we do not want to die for the sake of this stone." Despite these problems, the Don Cossacks managed to gather enough troops for the defense.

On 7 June 1641 the Ottoman-Tatar army under the command of Hüseyin Pasha reached Azov. On the first night they fought against 10,000 Cossacks who had come by way of the Don River; the next morning a guard post was set up on the Don to prevent any further help reaching the fortress by river. Because of cannon fire from the fortress, the Ottoman army made camp a cannon-shot's distance away. The following morning, the commander-in-chief Hüseyin Pasha prepared to attack with the troops under his command and twelve balyemez cannons.

That same day, Grand Admiral Siyavuş Pasha landed troops from the sea with 100 frigates and moved into the siege lines, while the frigates guarded the approaches along the Don. From the north, the Beylerbey of Anatolia, provincial troops, ten companies (orta) of Janissaries, and eight balyemez cannons; from the south, the Beylerbey of Karaman with six companies of Janissaries and six balyemez cannons; from the east, the Beylerbey of Rumelia with ten companies of Janissaries and ten balyemez cannons; and from the west, Kenan Pasha, Beylerbey of Silistra, with ten companies of Janissaries, one company of armorers (cebeci), one company of gunners, and ten balyemez cannons, all took up positions in the trenches and prepared for the siege.

Before attacking the fortress, the Ottomans followed custom and invited the Cossacks to enter the service of the Ottoman sultan. The Cossacks answered by making clear they had no intention of surrendering the fortress. Following this reply, fighting broke out that night and continued until morning. Ottoman troops damaged the walls and towers with cannon fire, while the Cossacks worked to repair the damage immediately. For seven days the fortress was pounded, opening new breaches. Turkish infantry then launched a sudden assault through the breaches and got inside the fortress, but the Cossacks poured heavy gunfire onto them. The melee between the Ottomans and the Cossacks continued for three days, until the Cossacks drove the Turkish troops back.

After this failed assault, fighting continued and the trenches around the fortress were captured. Meanwhile, in an attempt to relieve the besieged Cossacks, 4,000 Cossacks tried to reach the fortress along the Don with 40 frigates, but Kenan Pasha, lying in ambush on the river, opened fire on the boats with balyemez cannons. The boats sank and the Cossacks aboard drowned; those who reached shore were taken prisoner. The Cossacks then gave up sending help by boat. Instead, every night 500–600 Cossacks would slip into the Don and swim to Azov Fortress under cover of darkness, past thousands of watching sentries, breathing through reeds held in their mouths, and in this way many Cossacks reached the fortress to help with its defense. They also moved tools, weapons, and munitions to the fortress by packing them into ox-hide skins and floating them down the river partly submerged. When the Ottomans learned of this, they drove stakes into the riverbed to seal the river off. The Cossacks were thus cut off from further help, but kept fighting.

The early assaults had not brought the Ottomans the success they wanted, so earthen siege ramparts began to be built level with, and even above, the walls of Azov. Constant Cossack attacks, however, kept the ramparts from being finished. At one point, while a rampart was under construction, the Don Cossacks tunneled beneath it and blew it up. A new rampart was then ordered built a little further back. From this position, Ottoman artillery bombarded the city's walls and buildings for sixteen days. At the same time, the Ottomans drove roughly 17 mine tunnels toward the fortress, and the Cossacks dug counter-mines against them. This underground struggle ended in an Ottoman defeat: the Don Cossacks correctly worked out the direction of the Ottoman tunnels and used the time this bought them to lay gunpowder in their own countermines. The underground explosions crippled not only Ottoman siege works but Ottoman soldiers as well. After the mining effort failed, the commander Hüseyin Pasha ordered the city to be bombarded outright, and fires broke out across Azov as a result. Ottoman guns leveled parts of the fortress, while Cossacks fleeing the bombardment took shelter underground.

The Cossacks' long endurance was made possible by the fact that the Cossacks knew key weak points in the fortress's defenses and kept reinforcing them.

11 days into the siege, the Ottoman army ran out of gunpowder, and for 22 days they waited for men sent to Kaffa and Istanbul to return with more. The Ottoman Grand Vizier, Kemankeş Kara Mustafa Pasha, anticipating that the siege would not go easily and wanting to avoid a further shortage, had requested 3,000 kantars of gunpowder, but the central government judged 1,200 kantars were sufficient. It then took roughly another 40 for the gunpowder sent from Istanbul to reach Azov.

While the Ottoman troops were struggling with their powder supply, a rumor, which was false, started that the Tsar of Muscovy was approaching with 200,000 men and this caused alarm in the Ottoman camp. A council was called, attended by all the pashas and commanders. The council discussed how the onset of harsh winter would freeze the Sea of Azov, how after November it would be impossible for the troops and the fleet to winter there, and how no help or supplies could reach them from any direction. As a result, Kenan Pasha and the Arsenal Steward (Tersane Kethüdası) Piyale Kethüda decided that another assault should be mounted. From the imperial armory (cebehâne-i âmire), 7,000 swords, 2,000 shields, 2,000 muskets, 5,000 bows, 40,000 arrows, 6,000 spears, 5,000 hand grenades, and other pieces of equipment were distributed to the troops.

The next morning an assault went in under cannon and musket fire, and Ottoman soldiers pushed as far as the fortress's earthen fort and planted their standards on its ramparts. The Cossacks abandoned the earthen fort and withdrew into their underground shelters, so that a large part of the Ottoman force ended up massed inside it. The Cossacks then detonated a mine they had laid, blowing the ramparts the Ottoman troops were on top of and scattering them. The surviving Turkish soldiers fought on against the Cossacks but withdrew when no reinforcements arrived. In an archival Ottoman document dated to 1641, it was recorded that 458 janissaries of the "Dergâh-ı Âli" sent to relieve Azov that year were killed in action. and 1,200 other soldiers, like Sekbans and Sipahis fighting on-foot, were either wounded or killed. That night the Cossacks worked until dawn repairing the fortress's damaged walls, digging trenches down to the water table, mounting cannons at the corner bastions, and building numerous loopholed firing positions. Seeing this, Ottoman morale collapsed, though the fighting continued.

On 20 September the Ottoman command met again to discuss the situation. To lift the soldiers' spirits with some plunder, it was decided that Bahadır Giray Khan would raid Muscovite territory. Although he and his Tatars returned with a great deal of plunder, fear of a harsh Azov winter had taken hold, and at a final council, a report was drafted for the capital stating that the fortress could not be taken that year, that winter had arrived, that Muscovite territory had been raided and plunder and captives taken, and that "the Muscovite king has been taught his place." With that, the troops, having given up hope of taking the fortress, loaded their equipment onto the ships and lifted the siege. The Ottoman pashas, despite the hardships, had argued for continuing to fight until a decree arrived from the sultan, or even waiting until spring; but the Khan of the Crimean Khanate, Bahadır I Giray, citing exhausted provisions, ordered the Crimean Tatar cavalry under his command back to Crimea. After reporting the khan's action to the sultan, the Ottoman pashas withdrew from Azov as well.

In the siege, the Cossacks also suffered serious losses. Approximately 3,000 Cossacks were killed by Turkish soldiers and many were wounded. Although this failed siege experience had a demoralizing effect on the Ottoman side, attempts to return to Azov did not cease, and the sultan had begun preparations for a new campaign to be launched the following year.

On the Russian side, the question of going to war against the Turks for Azov was put to an Assembly of the Realm in January 3, 1642, which approved sending 10,000 troops and 200,000 rubles, but the tsar’s government was far more cautious, for new inspections showed Deli Hüseyin's siege had spared very little of Azov's fortifications, and there was concern that finances and manpower were not up to the task of a protracted war with the Turks when so much remained to be done to complete and man the Belgorod Line. Therefore they concluded that trying occupy Azov would be too costly and they wanted to avoid a war with Ottoman Empire and the government instead resumed paying tribute to the new Crimean khan Mehmed IV Giray, even though the envoys it had sent to Crimea were being abused. When Sultan Ibrahim issued a new ultimatum to Moscow on March 1642, Tsar Mikhail complied and ordered the Don Cossacks to evacuate Azov. Ottoman forces reoccupied Azov in September 1642 and reinforced its garrison.

== Aftermath ==
Having regained control of Azov Fortress, the Ottoman state, realizing it had become an important border fortress, rebuilt it and, in the following period, built additional fortifications along the Don River to prevent attacks against the fortress. The Ottoman grand vizier of the time, Kemankeş Kara Mustafa Pasha underlined that there was no military achievement in the fortress's capture, saying, "The conquest of Azov is not that great a conquest." The Don Cossacks' brief hold on Azov prompted the Ottoman state to attach greater importance to the security of the Azov region.

Although there was still no powerful state on the northeastern edge of Ottoman territory, it came to be recognized that one had to be prepared for the unpredictable consequences of raids that sometimes seemed insignificant. Given the conclusion reached by the Russians, who examined in detail the financial and military burden that holding Azov Fortress would entail, it was clear that maintaining control of Azov required not only a constant supply of provisions, munitions, and cash but also a reliable and solid garrison.

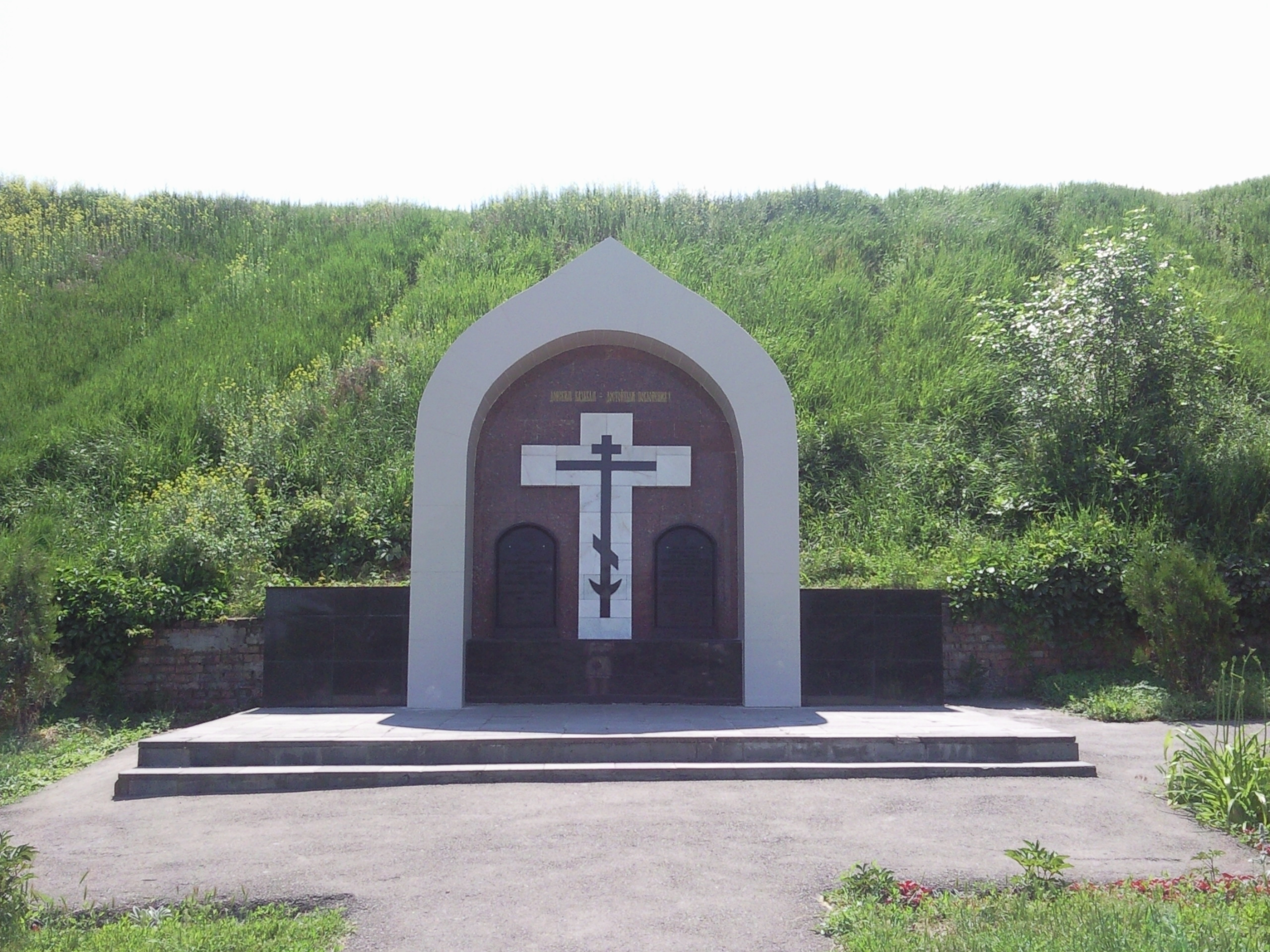
Memorial to the Cossacks who died in Azov

== Bibliography ==
- Roşu, Felicia (2021). Slavery In The Black Sea Region, C. 900– 1900. Chapter 8 (Maryna Kravets & Victor Ostapchuk). Brill. ISBN 978-9004470712.
- Novoselyskiy, A. A. (2011). XVII. Yüzyılın Birinci Yarısında Moskova Devletinin Tatarlarla Mücadelesi. TTK. ISBN 978-9751623973.
- Tikhonov, A. Yuri (1979). Azovskoe Sidenie. Voprosy Istorii.
- Kahraman, Seyit Ali (2017). Evliya Çelebi Seyahatnamesi 6. Cilt (Kutulu 2 Kitap) (Günümüz Türkçesiyle) Podgoriçe-İştib-Vidin-Peçoy-Budin-Üstürgon (Estergon)-Ciğerdelen Macaristan-Öziçe-Taşlıca-Dobra-Venedik-Mostar-Kanije. Yapı Kredi Yayınları. ISBN 9789750818585.
- Yılmazer, Ziya (2003). Topçular Katibi Abdülkādir (Kadri) Efendi Tarihi. TTK. ISBN 9789751615879.
