= Sofu Mehmed Pasha =

Grand Vizier of the Ottoman Empire from 1648 to 1649

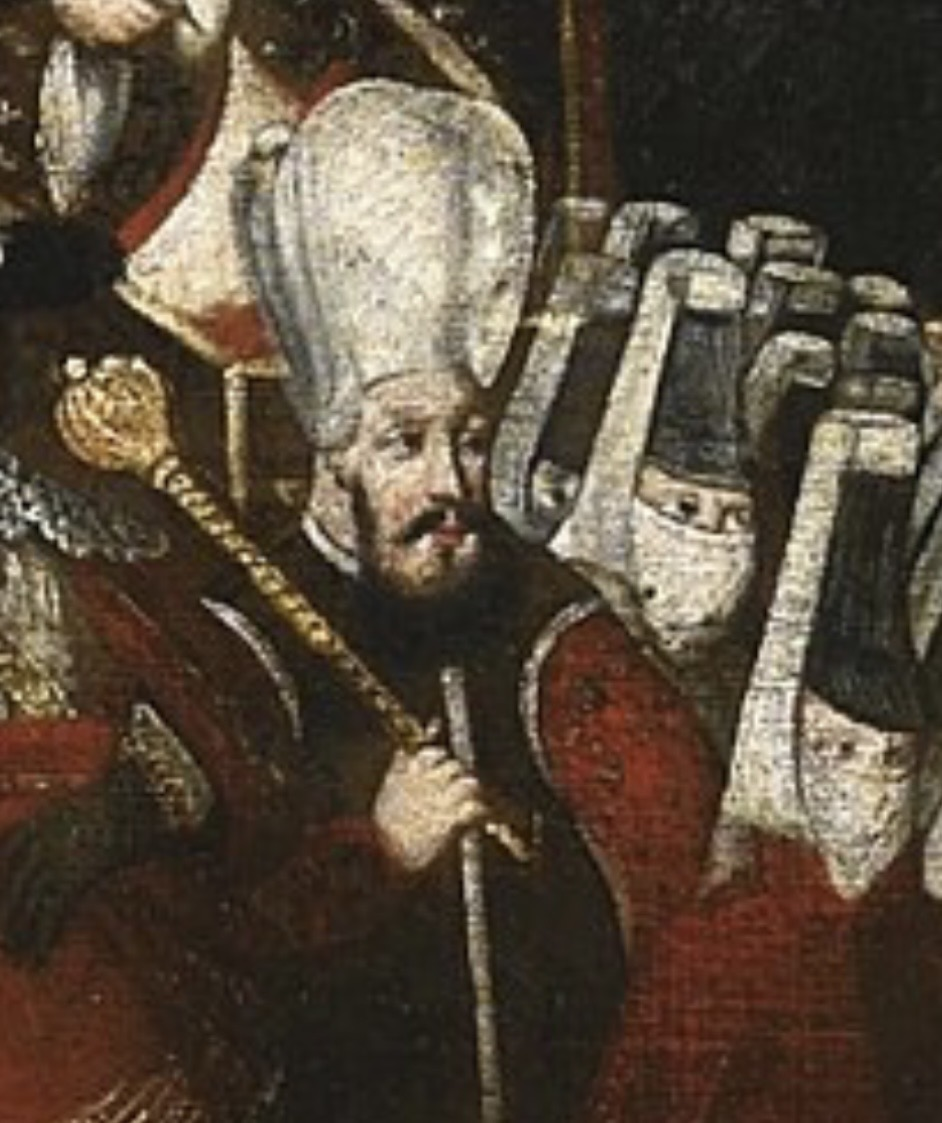
- Mehmed Pasha at coronation of Ottoman Sultan Osman II

Grand Vizier of the Ottoman Empire
- In office 8 August 1648 – 21 May 1649
- Monarchs: Ibrahim; Mehmed IV
- Preceded by: Hezarpare Ahmed Pasha
- Succeeded by: Kara Murat Pasha

Defterdar
- In office 1636–1639
- Preceded by: Mostarlı Ibrahim Pasha
- Succeeded by: Defterdarzade Ibrahim Pasha

Personal details
- Died: August 1649 Malkara, Ottoman Empire

Sofu Mehmed Pasha (died August 1649), also known as Mevlevi Mehmed Pasha, was an Ottoman statesman who served as grand vizier and defterdar (finance minister).

== Early years ==
He was a chamberlain/deputy (kethüda) of a defterdar (the head of the treasury). During the reign of Murad IV in 1636, he was appointed as the defterdar and served until 1639. During his retirement, he became a member of Mevlevi Order gaining the title Mevlevi or Sofu. During the turbulent events taking place just before the dethronement of Ibrahim in 1648, the previous grand vizier Hezarpare Ahmet Pasha had been lynched by an angry mob, and the Janissary leaders forced the sultan to appoint Sofu Mehmed Pasha as the grand vizier. The sultan reluctantly agreed on 8 August 1648. Nevertheless, the sultan was dethroned five days after his appointment. Despite this dethronement, Sofu Mehmed Pasha was still afraid of the former sultan, as there was a possibility of the Janissaries re-enthroning him. To Sofu Mehmed Pasha's relief, Ibrahim was executed ten days after his dethronement. Sofu Mehmed Pasha is thought to have been personally present during the execution.

== Grand Vizierate ==
A great problem for Sofu Mehmed was the economy. His top priority in the government was the treasury. He limited expenditures, but this policy caused reactions among the sipahi troops, leading them to revolt. Sofu Mehmed saved his life by taking refuge behind the power of the Janissary troops. Although this saved his life, the Janissaries gained an excess of power from the incident, and soon, the commander of the Janissary Kara Murat Pasha took sides against Sofu Mehmed. The defeat of the Ottoman navy in the Battle of Focchies on 12 May 1649 was a further blow to Sofu Mehmed Pasha.

== Death ==
On 21 May 1649, he was replaced by Kara Murat Pasha. He was exiled to Malkara (a town in European Turkey), and soon, Kara Murat Pasha had him executed there in August 1649.

== See also ==
- List of Ottoman grand viziers
- List of Ottoman ministers of finance

Political offices
Preceded by Mostarlı Ibrahim Pasha	Defterdar; 1636–1639	Succeeded by Defterdarzade Ibrahim Pasha
Preceded by Hezarpare Ahmed Pasha	Grand Vizier of the Ottoman Empire; 7 August 1648 – 21 May 1649	Succeeded by Kara Murad Pasha
