= Zurnazen Mustafa Pasha =

Grand Vizier of the Ottoman Empire in 1656

Zurnazen Mustafa Pasha was an Ottoman statesman of Albanian origin. He was Grand Vizier of the Ottoman Empire for 4 hours on March 5, 1656. He is sometimes excluded from the lists of Ottoman Grand Viziers. He was promoted from the in-attorney title to the rank of full grand vizier due to the influence he exerted on the sultan for Gazi Hüseyin Pasha's dismissal from the office. His appointment caused an uprising in Istanbul, and he was exiled after having only held the seal for four hours.

Political offices
Preceded by Gazi Hüseyin Pasha	Grand Vizier of the Ottoman Empire; 5 March 1656	Succeeded by Abaza Siyavuş Pasha I
