= Macar Hacı Hasan Pasha =

Ottoman statesman and admiral

Hasan Pasha (died 1768), known by the epithets Uzun Hasan Pasha ("the Tall") or Macar Hasan Pasha ("the Hungarian") or Hacı Hasan Pasha ("the Hajji") or Kazıkçı Hasan Pasha ("the Swindler"), was an Ottoman statesman and admiral.

Hasan Pasha served as Kapudan Pasha (grand admiral of the Ottoman Navy) from February to December 1764 and also served as the Ottoman governor of Cyprus (1762), Eğriboz (1762–64), Egypt (1764–65), Van (1767), Marash (1767–68), Trikala (1768), and Belgrade (1768). He died in Belgrade while still in office in 1768.

He had his origins in the Janissary corps of the Ottoman army.

== See also ==
- List of Kapudan Pashas
- List of Ottoman governors of Egypt

Political offices
Preceded by Hacı Ahmed Pasha	Ottoman Governor of Egypt; 1764–1765	Succeeded by Silahdar Mahir Hamza Pasha
