= Nevesinli Salih Pasha =

Grand Vizier of the Ottoman Empire from 1645 to 1647

Grand Vizier of the Ottoman Empire
- In office 17 December 1645 – 16 September 1647
- Monarch: Ibrahim
- Preceded by: Semiz Mehmed Pasha
- Succeeded by: Kara Musa Pasha

Personal details
- Born: Nevesinje, Sanjak of Herzegovina, Bosnia Eyalet, Ottoman Empire (modern Bosnia and Herzegovina)
- Died: 16 September 1647 Istanbul, Ottoman Empire (modern Turkey)

Nevesinli Salih Pasha (Serbo-Croatian: Salih-paša Nevesinjac; Cyrillic: Салих-паша Невесињац, died 16 September 1647) was an Ottoman Bosnian civil servant and grand vizier.

== Early years ==
Salih Pasha was of South Slavic descent from Nevesinje, Sanjak of Herzegovina, Bosnia Eyalet, and was sent to Constantinople at a young age. During the reign of Sultan Murad IV (r. 1623–1640), he was a civil servant specialized in treasury. He served in some other posts as well, and finally during the reign of Sultan Ibrahim (r. 1640–1648) in 1644, he was appointed defterdar, the highest position in the treasury. In 1645, grand vizier Sultanzade Mehmet Pasha was dismissed from the post. The first choice of the sultan for the post was Yusuf Pasha. However, Yusuf Pasha did not accept, and Salih Pasha was appointed as grand vizier on 17 December 1645.

== Grand Vizierate ==
The most important issue in 1646 was the war in Crete, an important island in the Aegean Sea, which was a dependency of Republic of Venice in the first half of the 17th century (see Cretan War (1645–1669)). Salih Pasha sent Sultanzade Mehmet Pasha, his predecessor, to Crete as the general commander (Turkish: serdar). When Mehmet Pasha died soon afterwards, Gazi Hüseyin Pasha was appointed the next commander. He was successful in capturing Rethymno. Another mainstream issue at the time was the disobedience of the Mingrelia (also known as Samegrelo, in western Georgia) principality, which was a vassal state of the Ottoman Empire. Salih Pasha was able to maintain order there.

== Death ==
According to Austrian orientalist Joseph von Hammer-Purgstall, Sultan Ibrahim, an unbalanced monarch, had given strict orders to ban any horse carts in Istanbul, the capital. Seeing that his order was violated, he ordered the execution of his grand vizier, Salih Pasha. During a divan meeting, Salih Pasha was arrested and executed on 16 September 1647.

== See also ==
- List of Ottoman grand viziers

Political offices
Preceded by Sultanzade Mehmed Pasha	Grand Vizier of the Ottoman Empire; 17 December 1645 – 16 September 1647	Succeeded by Kara Musa Pasha
