= Kara Musa Pasha =

Grand Vizier of the Ottoman Empire (1647)

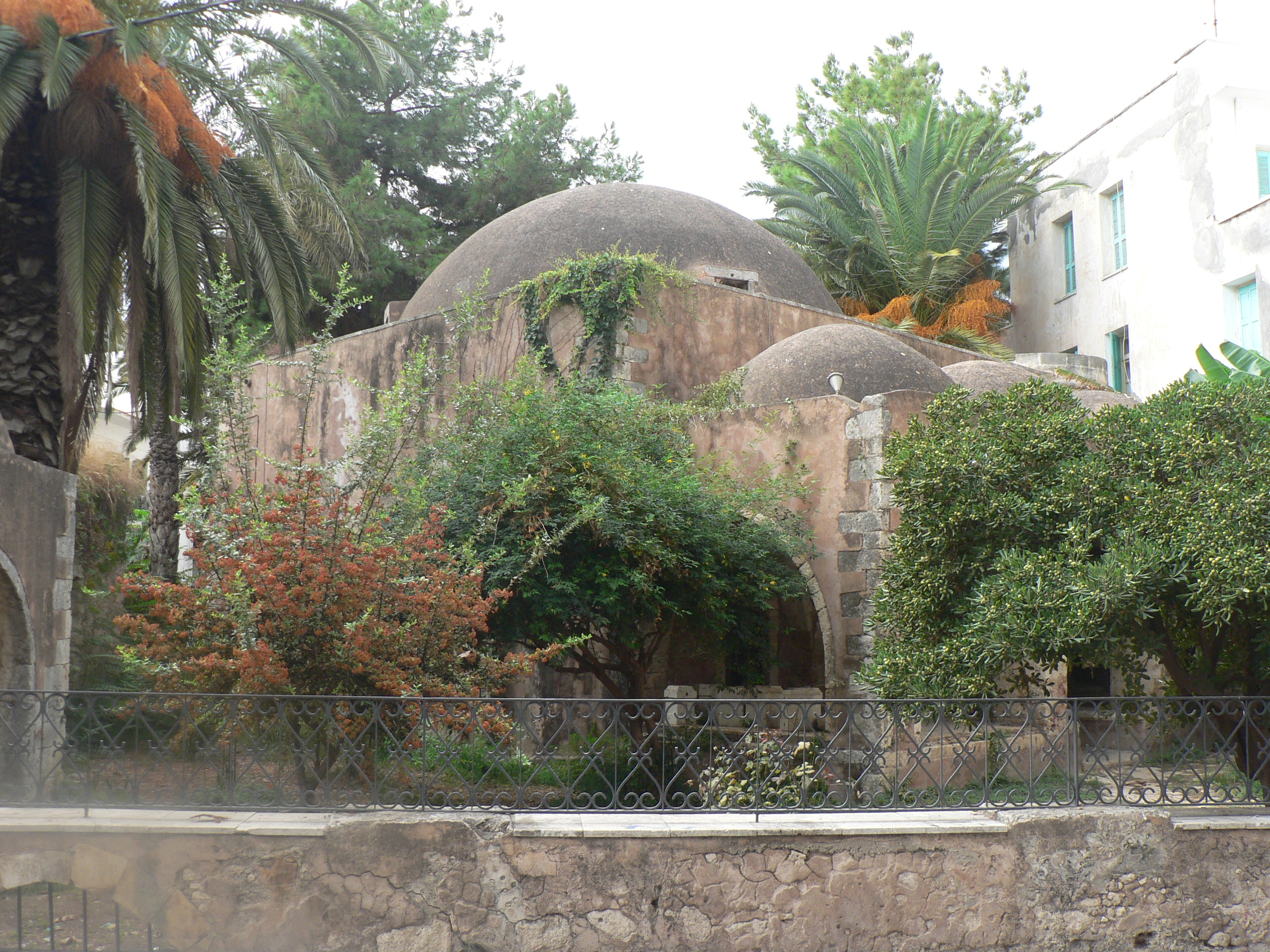
Kara Musa Pasha Mosque in Resmo – Rethymno, Crete

Kara Musa Pasha ("Musa Pasha the Courageous" in Turkish; died 1649) was an Ottoman soldier and statesman of Bosnian origin who was named grand vizier by Sultan Ibrahim on 16 September 1647 after Nevesinli Salih Pasha's execution, holding the office for only five days until 21 September. He also held the office of Kapudan Pasha (Grand Admiral of the Ottoman Navy) in 1647. He was trained in Enderûn.

== Origins ==
Musa Pasha was born in the Bosnian village of Vikoč, Foča in what was then the Sanjak of Herzegovina. He hailed from the Bosnian family of Vehabegović.

== Life in Ottoman politics ==
His first meeting with Sultan Murad IV was in 1630. Later on in his life, he became a member of Sublime Porte/Divan (the Ottoman government council) and was selected three times to serve as deputy of the Budin Eyalet. There in 1643, he reportedly received an endowment for the construction of the Musa-Pasha Mosque in Nova Kasaba, Bosnia and Herzegovina. During the Crete war campaign, after the death of the previous incumbent Koca Musa Pasha, Kara Musa Pasha received the title of Kapudan Pasha in 1647. When he invaded the city of Rethymno in Crete, he had a church there converted into a mosque, which still stands as "Kara Musa Pasha Mosque." However, because of lack of many successes, he was dismissed from the role of Kapudan Pasha soon afterwards.

Also while he was fighting in the war, the imperial seal signifying his promotion to grand vizier was sent to him by sea. After having received the news of his promotion, but not having yet received the seal, he was passed over for grand vizier because of the influence of Hezarpare Ahmet Pasha over the sultan, who instead chose Hezarpare Ahmet Pasha as grand vizier.

On 1642, having ended the Ottoman-Persian War, there were new initiatives from the anti-Habsburg coalition to invite the Ottomans through Transylvania. In 1643 a promise of helping was given during the preparation of George I Rákóczi's invasion of Hungary (1644–1645). However, on 1644, Musa Paşha was replaced by the more pacifistic Osman Paşa, who ratified the Treaty of Szőny which renew peace between both empires, influenced also by the start of the Cretan War, desiring the Ottomans to avoid a Land warfare in their Western Front, in favour of a Naval one against Venice (ally of France). In the 1645 Treaty of Linz, between Transylvania and the Habsburgs, the efforts to involucrate Ottomans in the war ended. Also there were offers from the Habsburgs to make an Anti-Swedish Coallition between Denmark-Norway, Poland-Lithuania and Russian Tsardom during 1644-1645, but were rejected due to the bad militar situation on the Imperial Side.

In the beginning of 1647, he had married Şekerpare Hatun, a lady in waiting and a favorite of the sultan, which was the very reason for his appointment as Grand Admiral.

In December 1647, Kara Musa Pasha was made the governor of Baghdad Eyalet in Ottoman Iraq. He held this post for just over a year until January 1649, when he was dismissed and returned to Constantinople. He was executed sometime that year on the orders of queen regent Kösem Sultan, in turn upon the advice of her advisers and grand vizier.

== See also ==
- List of Ottoman grand viziers
- List of Kapudan Pashas

== Footnotes ==
Political offices
Preceded by Nevesinli Salih Pasha	Grand Vizier of the Ottoman Empire; 16 September 1647 – 21 September 1647	Succeeded by Hezarpare Ahmed Pasha
