= Caffa (disambiguation) =

Caffa may refer to:

- Caffa, former name of Feodosiya, a town in Crimea
- Melchiorre Cafà or Caffa (1636-1667), 17th century Maltese sculptor

== See also ==
- Caffe (disambiguation)
- Kaffa (disambiguation)
