= Bakırcı Ahmed Pasha =

Bakırcı · Kara Ahmed Pasha

Ottoman Governor of Egypt
- In office 1633–1635
- Monarch: Murat IV
- Preceded by: Halil Pasha
- Succeeded by: Gazi Hüseyin Pasha

Personal details
- Born: Kayseri, Ottoman Empire
- Died: 1635 Istanbul, Ottoman Empire

Bakırcı Ahmed Pasha (Ahmed Pasha the Coppersmith; also known with the epithet Kara; died 1635) was an Ottoman statesman. He served as the governor of Egypt between 1633 and 1635.

== Background ==
Ahmed Pasha was born in the city of Kayseri in the Ottoman Empire. He was made a "chief of the states" or "stablemaster" (Turkish: imrahor or mirahur) at one point. He was made a vizier in 1633, the same year that he was appointed as governor of Egypt.

== Governorship of Egypt ==
In August 1633, sultan Murad IV ordered Ahmed Pasha to send him 2,000 troops, 5,000 kantars (500,000 lbs.) of biscuits, and 4,000 kantars (400,000 lbs.) of gunpowder to Syria, as he was preparing an expedition against the Druze prince Fakhr al-Din II. Ahmed Pasha sent all but the 2,000 troops, instead opting for sending just 500 led by emir Defterdar Hasan Bey, who had also acted as kaymakam (acting governor) between the departure of the previous governor Halil Pasha and the arrival of Ahmed Pasha in Egypt.

Ahmed Pasha gained his epithet bakırcı ("coppersmith") through the main issue surrounding his term: coining new copper money for Egypt in the wake of the copper shortage in the province. When transferring power to Ahmed Pasha, Hasan Bey reported to him the state of matters. In order to coin small denominations, Ahmed Pasha asked the sultan to send him 1,000 hundredweights (100,000 lbs.) of copper. Instead, the sultan sent him 12 times as much copper, 12,000 hundredweights (1,200,000 lbs.), and asked for its value in coins back, which amounted to 300,000 gold pieces. To convert the copper into coinage, Ahmed Pasha assembled the sanjak-beys to give opinions on the subject; they suggested that the copper be turned into obol coins. Thus, Ahmed Pasha gathered as many smiths and workmen as he could to convert the copper into a usable form. However, the coinage produced by the workmen turned out to only be worth about half of the ancient obol coins. This resulted in severe inflation in Egypt, and furthermore, many of the workmen began to die from the hot conditions of the workhouses. After inspecting the workhouses, Ahmed Pasha cancelled the coinage and sent the workers home.

A few days later, Ahmed Pasha gathered the local emirs and kadıs (judges) and asked them for advice on what to do with the already minted low-quality copper. One of the kadıs suggested that the pasha circulate the newly minted specie amongst the population by trading the copper coins for their existing money. Although this was not the pasha's original plan (which was to make the copper into wedges and send it to Takrur and sub-Saharan Africa, and reimburse the sultan's 300,000 gold coins out of his own pocket), he soon warmed up to the idea. The distribution of the copper began on January 13, 1634 and lasted until October of that year. Most citizens received the equal specie for their money, but as the distribution continued, eventually in February 1635, the people were given 80 kuruş for 100 lbs. of copper (instead of the normal 45 kuruş for 100 lbs.), i.e. losing the government money.

Also in February 1635, the sultan ordered Ahmed Pasha to send him 3,000 troops and 3,000 kantars (300,000 lbs) of gunpowder, this time for an expedition against the Persians.

Ahmed Pasha was dismissed from office in 1635 either for cruelty or because of the sultan's displeasure with his monetary (losing the government money by giving specie for 80 kuruş per 100 lbs. instead of 45 kuruş) and military policy (sending only poor soldiers and exempting the rich in exchange for money). When leaving Egypt, he refused to pay the customary dues that Ottoman governors of Egypt paid to the provincial treasury for the damage inflicted during their term, instead choosing to submit to the judgment of the sultan Murad IV. When he arrived in Istanbul, Ahmed Pasha was soon afterwards executed on the sultan's orders.

== See also ==
- List of Ottoman governors of Egypt

Political offices
Preceded by Halil Pasha	Ottoman Governor of Egypt; 1633–1635	Succeeded by Gazi Hüseyin Pasha
