= Kara Musa Pasha Mosque =

Former mosque in Rethymno, Greece

- Τζαμί Καρά Μουσά Πασά
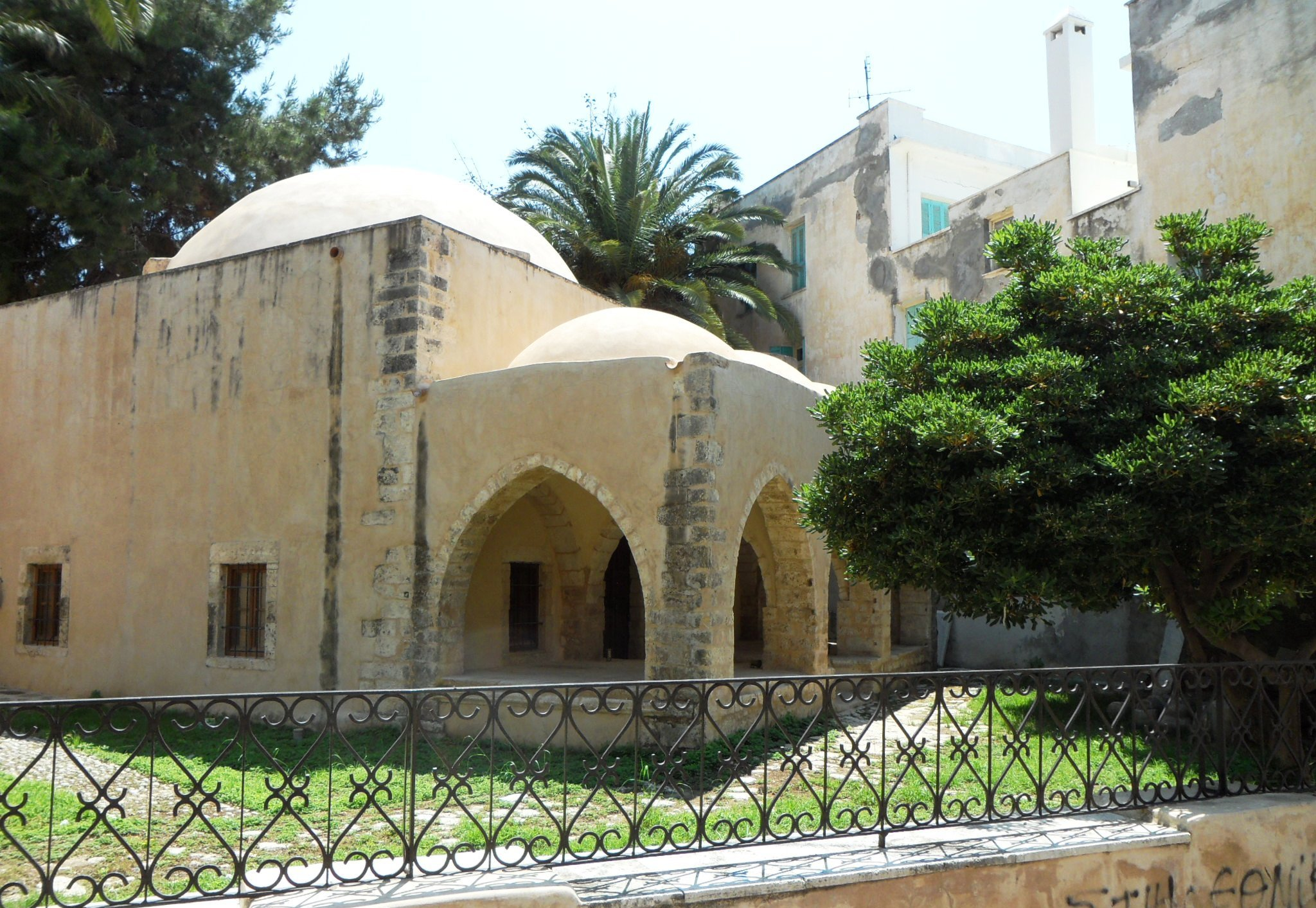
- The former mosque

- Location of the former mosque in Greece

Religion
- Affiliation: Islam (former)
- Ecclesiastical or organizational status: Mosque (1680s–1890s)
- Status: Abandoned (as a mosque); Repurposed (as a museum)

Location
- Location: Rethymno, Crete
- Country: Greece
- Interactive map of Kara Musa Pasha Mosque
- Coordinates: 35°22′00″N 24°28′44″E

Architecture
- Type: Mosque
- Style: Ottoman
- Founder: Kara Musa Pasha
- Completed: c. 1680s

Specifications
- Dome: 1
- Minaret: 1 (destroyed)
- Materials: Stone

The Kara Musa Pasha Mosque (Greek: Τζαμί Καρά Μουσά Πασά; Turkish: Kara Musa Paşa Camii) is a former mosque in the town of Rethymno, on the island of Crete, Greece. Built in the c. 1680s, during the Ottoman era, the mosque was abandoned during the 1890s.

== History ==
Located on Arkadiou street, it was most likely erected during the 1680s, or right after the conquest of the city in 1646, perhaps by the Ottoman governor of Crete, on the site of a Venetian monastery dedicated to Saint Barbara. Another date of erection suggested is 1683. Today it is preserved in its entirety in good condition, save for its minaret, of which only the base survives. It has been restored by the Greek Archaeological Service, and is being considered to be made into a museum about the Ottoman architecture of Crete.

== Architecture ==
After the monastery's conversion into mosque in the seventeenth century, a dome and a minaret was added to it by the Ottoman Turks.

In the area there is also a fountain topped with a dome, which has two sides: one side facing Arkadiou Street, and the other the courtyard of the mosque. Under its dome is the entrance to the mosque. A turbes (a type of vaulted funerary structure) is preserved in the precinct, in which the founder of the mosque, Kara Musa Pasha, was probably buried.

== Gallery ==
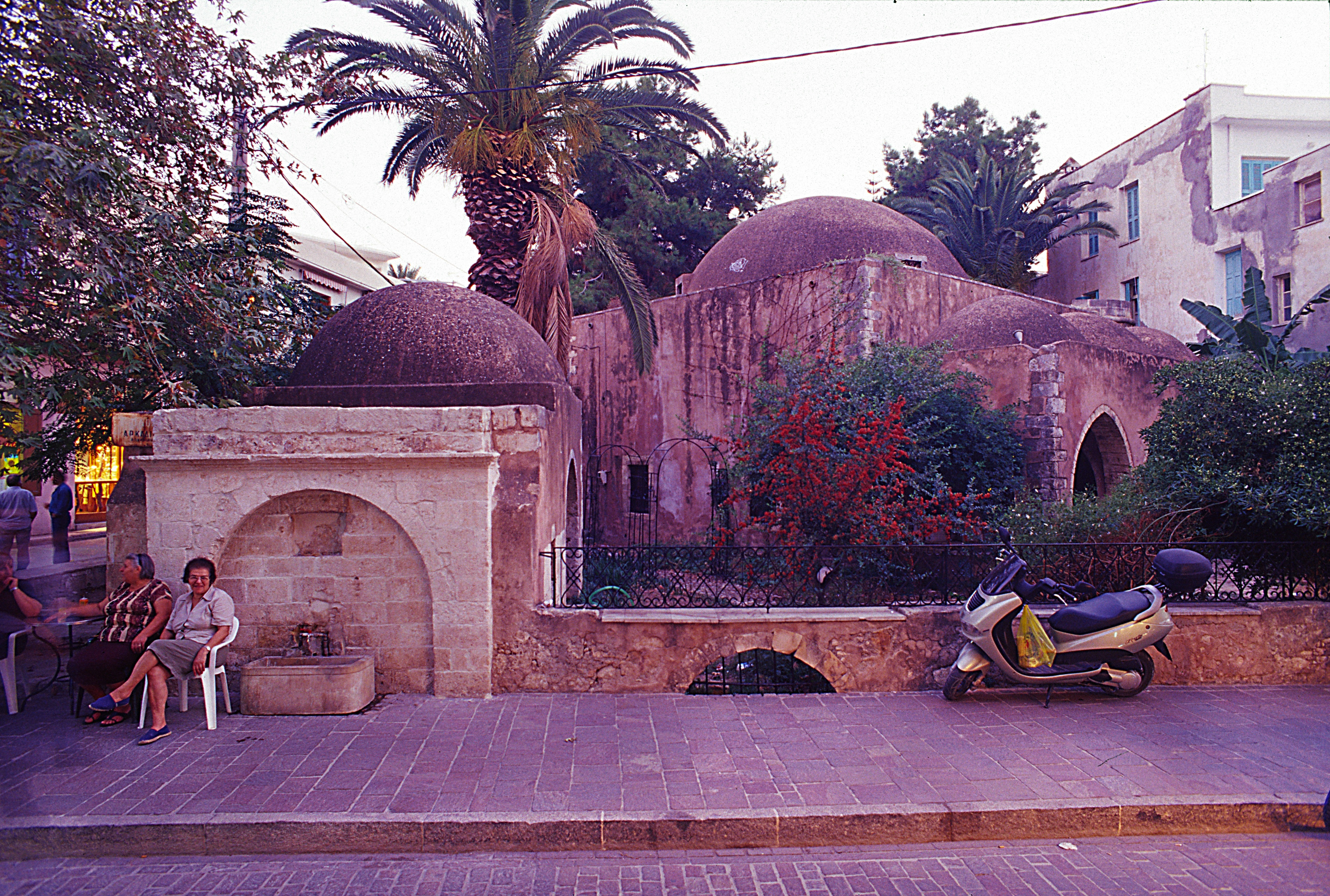
Former mosque and fountain

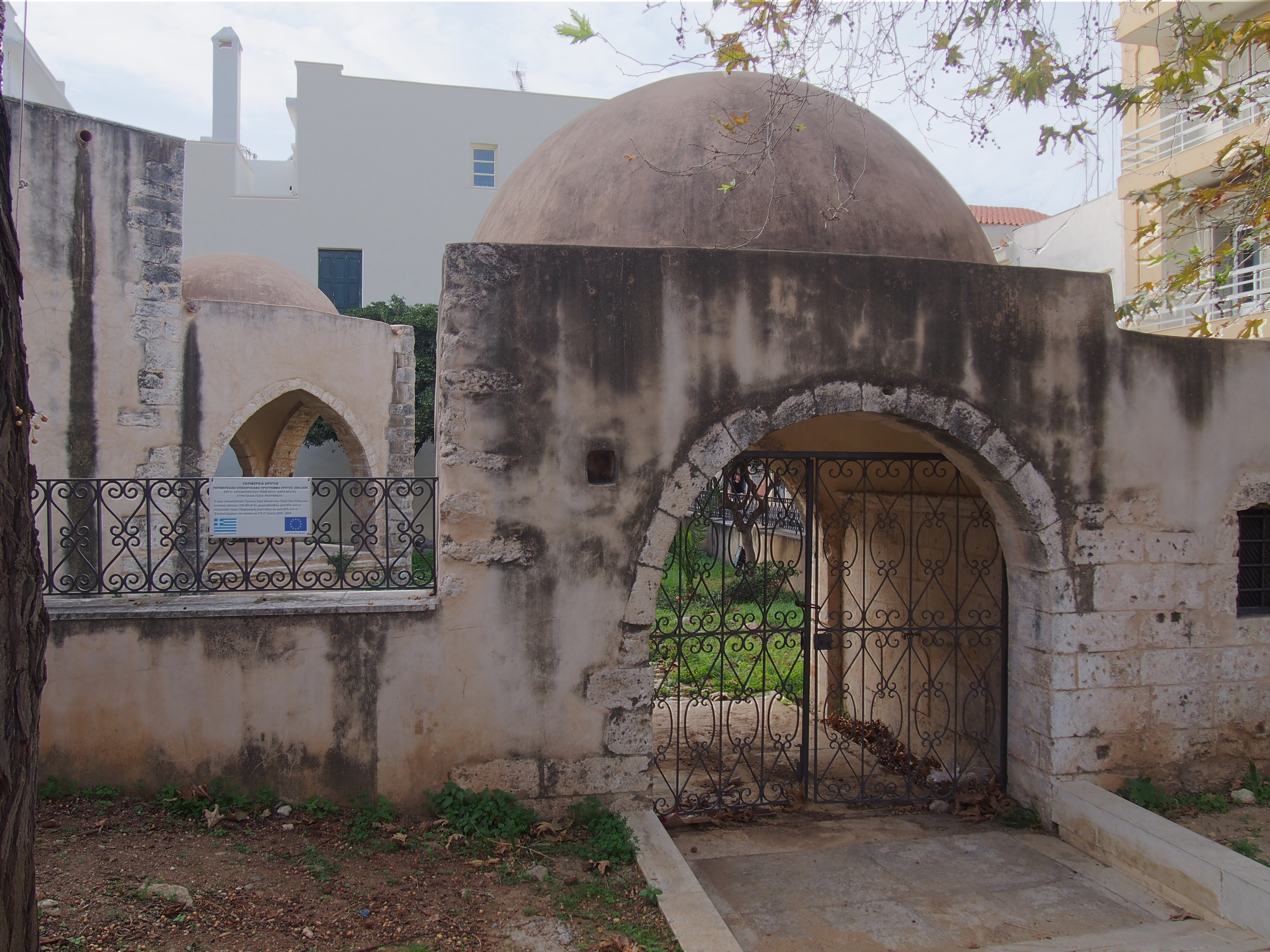
Gate

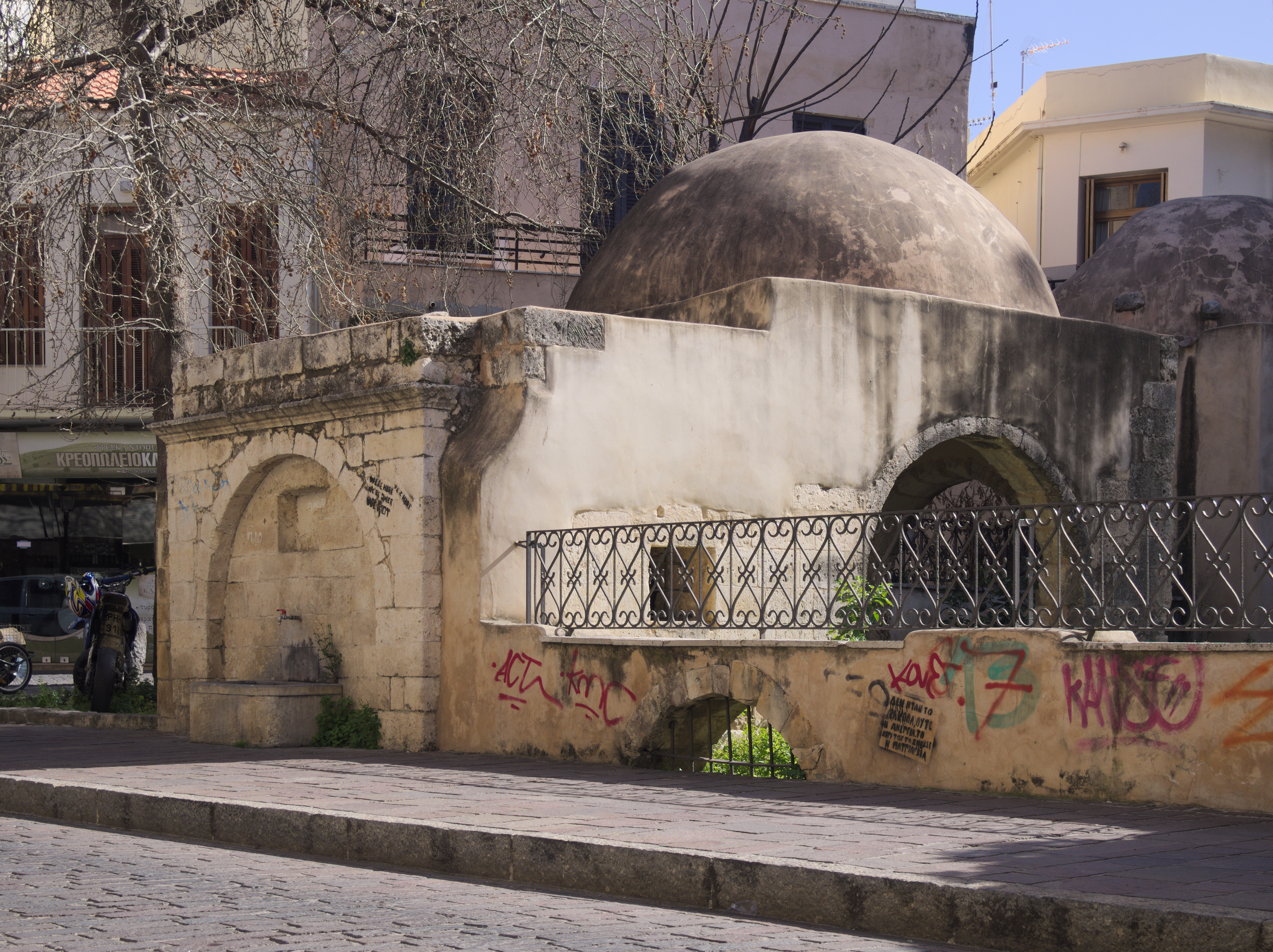
View of the fountain

== See also ==
- Islam in Greece
- List of former mosques in Greece
- Ottoman Crete
