= Caffe =

Caffe may refer to:

- Caffè, the Italian word for coffee, used as an alternative spelling of café
- Caffe (software), a library for deep learning

== See also ==
- Caffa (disambiguation)
