= Bahadır I Giray =

Khan of Crimea from 1637 to 1641

Bahadır I Giray (Note: Crimean Tatar, Ottoman Turkish and Persian: بهادر کرای) (1602–1641, reigned 1637–1641) was a khan of the Crimean Khanate. Much of his reign was spent dealing with Azov which had been captured by the Cossacks. He died from wounds or illness while returning from the failed Azov campaign in 1641. He was the father of Selim I Giray and, through him, the ancestor of all khans who reigned after 1700 except for Devlet III.

== Early life and enthronement ==
He was the son of Selâmet I Giray who reigned from 1608 to 1610. During his father's reign he was sent to Turkey as a ‘rekhin’ or honorable hostage. He grew up on an estate near Yambol. He was described as handsome, learned, eloquent and something of a poet. In June 1637 the Turks deposed İnayet Giray and placed Bahadir on the throne. As kalga and nureddin he chose the brothers Islyam and Safa Girai. Just after coming to the throne he learned that the Don Cossacks had captured Azov.

== Reign and Azov problem ==
Azov, or Azak as it was then called, lies at the northeast corner of the Sea of Azov, at the mouth of the Don River. In 1471 the Turks captured it from the Genoese. They used it mainly to collect customs, control trade and to prevent the Don Cossacks from raiding into the Black Sea. Around 1630 the Kalmyks arrived from further east and drove many of the Nogais westward. This removed a screen that protected Azov from the Don Cossacks.

In the spring of 1637, when İnayet Giray was away fighting the Budjaks, the Don Cossacks besieged Azov. The garrison thought it was safe behind its walls, but the Cossacks dug a mine under the wall, filled it with gunpowder and blew it up. They burst through breach and killed everyone in the fort (28 June). The news reached Crimea just after Bahadir came to the throne.

This was a major problem for all the neighboring powers. Some thought that it might be the beginning of a Russian push south similar the Russian capture of Astrakhan 81 years before. It also raised the possibility of a Russo-Turkish war, something that neither of the two powers wanted. The matter was complicated by the murder of Foma Kantakuzin. He was a Christian in the Ottoman service who was sent as an ambassador to Moscow. Like all such people, he travelled along the Don, where the Cossacks were expected to provide supplies and guards. He passed through just as the Cossacks were preparing their attack on Azov. He tried to warn the Turks and the Cossacks killed him.

In September Bahadir sent an army under Safa Giray to the Muscovite border. He did little damage but achieved the khan's purpose of reminding the tsar that Crimea was dangerous. The tsar sent ambassadors to Crimea and Istanbul claiming that the Don Cossacks acted on their own, which was basically true, although Russia informally provided them with gunpower and other supplies. Sultan Murad, who was tied up with the siege of Bagdad, ordered the Crimeans to retake Azov. He also ordered them to send 10,000 soldiers to Armenia. The khan called a meeting of his nobles. There was no objection the eastern campaign, so Safa Giray left with part of the army The nobles objected that the Crimean horsemen could not take a walled fort without artillery and engineers. Since this was true, Bahadir chose a policy of diplomacy and delay.

In the spring of 1638 ambassadors were sent to Azov, but the Cossacks refused to leave. Murad threatened to remove Bahadir. Toward the end of summer Piyale Pasha arrived with a fleet. The khan accompanied him to Azov where he cut off supplies from Russia but could do nothing with the fort without artillery. When winter approached, he returned to Crimea.

In 1639 the same pattern threatened to repeat itself. Bahadir proposed to attack the Dnieper Cossacks since they were more dangerous than the Don Cossacks. Murad rejected this. Further delay was imposed by the Mansur conspiracy (below). As winter approached, the Azov campaign was put off until next year. Late in the year Murad ordered the khan to raid Poland and bring back at least 8000 slaves for the Turkish galleys. Kalga Islyam Giray obtained the required number near Kiev. Konetspolski pursued him but was stopped by snowstorms (February 1640). On this campaign Nureddin Safa Giray died.

Ottoman–Safavid War (1623–1639) ended, thereby freeing up troops for Azov. In the spring of 1641 the Turks sent large forces to Azov under Deli Hussein. Since there was now artillery the Crimeans had no objection to the campaign. By July they reached the Don. Deli Hussein first tried to storm the fort and lost hundreds of men. He then tried bombardment. Soon most of the walls and buildings were destroyed, but the ground was soft and trenches soon replaced walls. Both sides dug gunpowder-filled mines and blew them up. The Crimeans served mainly as a screen to prevent supplies from reaching the fort. The Turks began to run low on gunpowder. As autumn approached Bahadir announced that he was going home because the Crimeans could not winter on the steppe. If Crimeans could not endure a steppe winter then neither could janissaries, so Deli Hussein lifted the siege.

Bahadir, who had been growing ill for several years, died at Gozlev soon after returning to Crimea.

Deli Hussein spent the winter in Kaffa, returned to Istanbul, and was not punished for his failure. In the spring of 1642 the tsar ordered the Don Cossacks to abandon Azov. (Azov was taken by Russia in 1694, lost in 1711 and finally taken in 1774.)

== Budjaks, Cossacks and the Mansur conspiracy ==
At this time the Budjak Horde was very active and a problem to all its neighbors. The sultan wanted them out of the way. In early 1637 Inayet Giray defeated them and led them east toward Crimea. They revolted, killed Inayet's two brothers and returned to Budjak. Bahadir sent kalga Islyam Giray and Gulum Bey of the Mansurs to Akkerman to bring them back. Fearing punishment for the murders and lacking Turkish support, the horde offered to submit to Poland, its traditional enemy and victim. When the Poles did nothing they submitted and moved back toward Crimea. (1637 or 1638)

The Zaporozhian Cossacks were growing increasingly disobedient to their Polish masters. In 1635 the Poles began building the Kodak Fortress near the head of the Dnieper rapids to control the Cossacks and block Crimean raids. Within a few months the place was destroyed by Cossack rebels. In the summer of 1637 the rebels chose Pavel Bout as their hetman, but he was soon defeated. The rebels gathered at Zaporozhye planning a new campaign. They appealed to Crimea, but the khan refused. A group of Nogais joined them. In the spring of 1638 a Polish army went to Zaporozhye and was defeated by the Nogais. The Poles eventually won, Kodak was restored and the rebellious Cossacks spread out, increasing the Cossack population east of the Dnieper.

The Mansur clan held the northwestern steppe-like part of Crimea and had connections with the steppe peoples. Gulum, the Mansur bey, saw that the Budjaks were discontented and disorganized. Knowing that they had been good fighters under Khan Timur, in 1639 he began planning to take them over. To support this risky plan he made contact with the Azov Cossacks, who, in turn, were trying to gain support of the local Nogais. Bahadir soon learned what was going on. He invited the Budjak nobles to his palace and killed them all. Salman Shah and the last son of Khan Temir fled to the Volga nomads, but were sent back and killed. Safa Girai was sent to slaughter the Mansur leaders including Gulum bey. This coup was authorized by a fatwa from the Kaffa mufti, which implies Bahadir had good evidence of a plot.

== Source and notes ==
- Oleksa Gaivoronsky «Повелители двух материков», Kiev-Bakhchisarai, second edition, 2009, ISBN 978-966-2260-02-1, volume 2, pp. 229–256
- footnotes

Preceded by İnayet Giray	Khan of Crimea; 1637–1641	Succeeded by Mehmed IV Giray
