= Halil Pasha =

Halil Pasha (Ottoman Turkish: حلیل پاشا) was an Ottoman statesman who served as the governor of Ottoman Egypt from 1631 to 1633. He was known for his "gentle, impartial, and prosperous administration" which was in large contrast to the "rapacious" administration of his predecessor, Koca Musa Pasha. In Shawwal 1041 AH (May 1632 CE), while governor, he sent an expeditionary force to the Hejaz to retake Mecca from Yemeni troops who had seized the city in the name of a pretender to the Sharifate.

== Governorship ==
Halil Pasha assumed office by arriving in Egypt in October 1631.

=== Mecca war ===
On 17 March 1632, he received intelligence that Arab armies had been on their way from Yemen to Ottoman-held Mecca with intentions to conquer it, and that they had indeed successfully conquered it and sacked it, killing the Sharif of Mecca, among others. When Halil Pasha told this news to his troops in Cairo, one emir, Kasım Bey, volunteered to lead an expedition to Mecca to take the city back from the Yemenis. Halil Pasha agreed, further assigning him assistants and organizing the troop officers and ranks for the war. He made emir Ridwan Bey al-Zulfiqar the head of the land-based troops to Mecca and the amir al-hajj ("leader of the hajj caravan"), making him responsible for the food and water of the pilgrims' animals en route to Mecca.

As the Ottoman army of Kasım Bey approached that of the Yemenis in Wadi Fatimah valley, a scout for the Yemenis, Kör Mahmud, scoped out the Ottoman army from behind a mountain. Seeing that it was too numerous to overcome, the Yemeni army retreated to Wadi Abbas valley and hid in a fort named Turbet. Meanwhile, Kasım Bey's Ottoman army entered Mecca, finding only 100 enemy troops who had not fled in time. After summarily executing them, the Ottoman army performed the ceremonies of Hajj, and then set out in search of the Yemeni army. In the same fashion, the Ottoman troops sailing to Jeddah found it deserted of enemy troops and took the city without resistance.

After seven days of trekking, Kasım Bey's army located the Yemeni army's tents at the foot of the Turbet fort and engaged them in combat, in which the Yemenis lost about 100 men. The next day, Kasım Bey ordered his troops to attack the Yemenis by hiding at the wells that supplied their army with water. This plan proceeded successfully, causing the Yemenis over 200 casualties that day, most from thirst. The Yemenis finally capitulated and surrendered, meeting Kasım Bey's requests for them to turn over to him Kör Mahmud and his brother. Kasım Bey allowed the Yemenis to leave the fort; only 300 of the original 1000 remained alive.

Returning to Mecca, the four chiefs of the Yemeni troops were put to death. This was followed by seven days of celebration, and when the Ottoman troops returned home to Cairo in August 1632, five more days of celebration occurred.

=== After the war ===
Halil Pasha's rule was reported to be a time of plenty for Egypt, with the price of corn falling 75%. One of Halil Pasha's acts was to put to death a Jew named Yakub, who had allegedly been putting stress on the populace with his usury.

When Halil Pasha left office on 1 April 1633, the shops in Cairo were closed for a week in mourning of the end of his term.

== Later life ==
After Halil Pasha returned to Istanbul, Sultan Murad IV confiscated his fortune and exiled him to Cyprus, but he later changed his mind and allowed him to continue his career as a statesman. He was made governor of Ottoman Cyprus until his death in 1639.

== See also ==
- List of Ottoman governors of Egypt
- Çandarlı Halil Pasha the Younger

== Notes ==
Political offices
| Preceded by Koca Musa Pasha | Ottoman Governor of Egypt; October 1631 – 1 April 1633 | Succeeded by Bakırcı Ahmed Pasha |
