= Koca Musa Pasha =

Koca Musa Pasha (usually referred to as just Musa Pasha; died 22 January 1647, near Euboea) was an Ottoman statesman. He served most prominently as Kapudan Pasha (1645–1647), Ottoman governor of Egypt (1630–1631), Ottoman governor of Budin Eyalet (1631–1634, 1637–1638, 1640–1644), and Ottoman governor of Silistra Eyalet (1644–1645). He was also a vizier.

== Background ==
Musa Pasha was born into a Bosniak family and attended the Enderun palace school.

== As governor of Egypt ==
Musa Pasha's term as the governor of Egypt was described as brutal and terror-inducing by multiple sources. On the first day of holding divan (government), he had a man's head struck off and his property confiscated, following this with the crucifixion of the son of a local sharif chief. After handing out the various government offices to his friends and servants and facing the displeasure of the sanjak-beys, Mustafa Pasha returned the offices to their previous owners and blamed the incident on an agha, confiscating his residence as ostensible punishment. During his governorship, Musa Pasha took on projects and plans to reform the salary system to his benefit and find methods to claim wealthy locals' inheritances.

=== Murder of Kitas Bey ===
In March 1631, sultan Murad IV ordered Musa Pasha to send him troops for the expedition against Persia. Musa Pasha gave command of these troops to emir Kitas Bey, who was of Circassian origins, and imposed a tax on the land in order to pay for the camels to transport the troops to Persia. Musa Pasha then told Kitas Bey that funds were insufficient for the expedition and that it was canceled. When Kitas Bey protested, Musa Pasha had him killed; on Wednesday, July 9, 1631, the Day of Arafa and the day before Eid al-Adha, a day when the emirs traditionally visited the governor's house to wish him well, Kitas Bey was in attendance despite having second thoughts because of his knowledge of his now-poor standing with the Pasha. Suddenly, Musa Pasha had a group of men spring upon Kitas Bey, one man decapitating him with a single swing of an axe, while up to 40 others stabbed his body as the other emirs stood by in horror.

=== Aftermath ===
After the sanjak-beys led by Kasım Bey held a funeral for Kitas Bey, they declared to the entire Egypt garrison that whoever would be present at Musa Pasha's Eid feast that day would be punished by death. Meanwhile, Musa Pasha waited for the guests to arrive, but when none did, he walked to the Al-Nasir Muhammad Mosque and prayed the Eid prayers, after which he sat down with the members of his household at the feast, distributing the rest amongst the poor of Cairo.

The leaders of the troops met at Kasım Bey's house and went to a local kazasker (high judge), employing him as their representative to go to Musa Pasha. The representative asked Musa Pasha on behalf of the troops why he had committed a murder on such a holy day, if there were any orders from the sultan from Constantinople, and to give up the men who had murdered Kitas Bey to the troops. Musa Pasha answered that he had done nothing outside the orders of the sultan but neither could he consent to any of the troops' demands. Although this response garnered displeasure from the troops, they left without taking any action.

The troops then caught up with four of Musa Pasha's trusted men, killed them, and dispersed. Two days later, now Friday, July 11, 1631, the troops reassembled with all the sanjak-beys, the leading officers meeting in the Mosque-Madrassa of Sultan Hassan. They met with the same kazasker as before, the naqib al-ashraf (head of the ashraf), and the mufti of the mosque. These representatives were once again sent to Musa Pasha, with the same list of demands, this time also naming eight of the assassins by name and demanding them to be turned over to the troops. Musa Pasha replied that responsibility was solely his, and that the men were only following his orders, offering to give himself up and allow the soldiers to nominate a kaymakam (acting governor) in his place. Although the troop leadership was divided on what action to take, with some factions claiming that they did not have the authority to replace the governor while others wishing to simply murder Musa Pasha and kidnap the eight men.

=== Removal from office ===
Eventually, the troops came to a consensus and chose to elect an acting governor, the elderly finance minister Hasan Bey. Musa Pasha immediately wrote to sultan Murad IV to inform him of the effective coup, and the troops did the same, choosing to send a petition of their grievances and justifications for their actions; the soldiers wrote in Turkish while the ulemas sent an Arabic version. Hasan Bey and the emirs demanded a large sum of money from Musa Pasha as restitution for the money he owed to the treasury, to pay for which he sold much of his animals and belongings. The sultan replied by agreeing with the troops' decision, sending Halil Pasha to take Musa Pasha's place as governor. On September 13, 1631, Halil Pasha's advisor arrived, while Hasan Bey continued to serve as acting governor until October, when Halil Pasha finally arrived.

== Death ==
Only two years after his appointment as Kapudan Pasha (grand admiral) of the Ottoman Navy, Musa Pasha died in battle with a Venetian fleet near the Greek island of Euboea in 1645 during the Cretan War (1645–69) (also known as the War of Candia or the Fifth Ottoman–Venetian War). His body was brought to the Üsküdar district of Istanbul and buried there.

== See also ==
- List of Kapudan Pashas
- List of Ottoman governors of Egypt

Political offices
Preceded by Tabanıyassı Mehmed Pasha	Ottoman Governor of Egypt; 1630–1631	Succeeded by Halil Pasha
Military offices
Preceded by	Kapudan Pasha; 1645 – 22 January 1647	Succeeded by Kara Musa Pasha
