= Haseki Mehmed Pasha =

Haseki Mehmed Pasha (also known as Mehmed Pasha Haseki or Mehmed Pasha Abu'l-Nur; fl. 1648–1661) was an Ottoman statesman and administrator. He served as the Ottoman governor of Damascus Eyalet (1650–52, 1656), Egypt Eyalet (1652–56), Baghdad Eyalet (1656–59), and Aleppo Eyalet (1659–61). He married Gevherhan Sultan, daughter of Murad IV.

== Background ==
Mehmed Pasha was educated in the Enderun palace school.

== Governorships ==
In July 1650, Mehmed Pasha became a vizier and was appointed the governor of Damascus Eyalet of the Ottoman Empire for the first time. On September 9, 1652, he was appointed the governor of Egypt Eyalet, a post he held until May 1656. One month after leaving the post, in June 1656, he was appointed the governor of Damascus a second time, but only held the post for three months, being dismissed in September. That fall, in October or November 1656, he was made the governor of Baghdad Eyalet. In late summer 1659, he became the governor of Aleppo Eyalet, but was dismissed in June 1661 by sultan Mehmed IV for minting too much coinage and thus causing inflation.

While governor of Egypt, he had a mosque built in the vicinity. He was known by the local Egyptians as Abu'l-Nur, or "the father of light," for restoring buildings and whitewashing them.

Also while governor of Baghdad, Mehmed Pasha sequenced works of diwan poetry.

== See also ==
- List of Ottoman governors of Egypt
- List of rulers of Damascus
- List of rulers of Aleppo

Political offices
Preceded by Hadım Abdurrahman Pasha	Ottoman Governor of Egypt; 1652–1656	Succeeded by Halıcı Damadı Mustafa Pasha
