= Kaffa =

Kaffa may refer to:

- Kaffa (city) or Theodosia, a Crimean city
- Kaffa Province, a former province in Ethiopia
- Kingdom of Kaffa, a medieval kingdom of the Kafficho people

== See also ==
- Caffa (disambiguation)
- Kafficho people, an ethnic group in the Southern Nations, Nationalities, and Peoples' Region, Ethiopia
