= Gazi Hüseyin Pasha =

Grand Vizier of the Ottoman Empire (1656)

Gazi · Deli · Sarı · Baltaoğlu Hüseyin Pasha
- Ideal portrait of Gazi Hüseyin Pasha on a 20th-century book cover

Grand Vizier of the Ottoman Empire
- In office 28 February 1656 – 5 March 1656
- Monarch: Mehmed IV
- Preceded by: Ermeni Suleyman Pasha
- Succeeded by: Zurnazen Mustafa Pasha

Ottoman Governor of Egypt
- In office 1635–1637
- Monarch: Murad IV
- Preceded by: Bakırcı Ahmed Pasha
- Succeeded by: Semiz Mehmed Pasha

Personal details
- Born: Yenişehir, Ottoman Empire
- Died: 1659 Istanbul, Ottoman Empire
- Origins: Turkish

Military service
- Allegiance: Ottoman Empire
- Branch/service: Ottoman Navy
- Rank: Kapudan Pasha (grand admiral)
- Never exercised the office of grand vizier

Gazi Hüseyin Pasha ("Hüseyin Pasha the Warrior"; died 1659), also known as Deli Hüseyin Pasha ("the Mad") or Sarı Hüseyin Pasha ("the Blonde") or Baltaoğlu Hüseyin Pasha ("of the Axe"), was an Ottoman military officer and statesman. He was governor of Egypt (1635–1637), Kapudan Pasha in the 1630s, and briefly Grand Vizier in 1656.

== Background ==
Hüseyin was of Turkish origin and was born in Yenişehir near Bursa in northwest Anatolia. Other than that, little is known about his early days in Constantinople (present-day İstanbul), the Ottoman capital. During the reign of Sultan Murad IV, he was a member of palace staff. The Shah Safi of Persia had sent Murad IV a prestigious gift, a bow which was reputed as being undrawable. Hüseyin attracted attention when he easily drew the bow. After winning sultan's appreciation, he was promoted to various posts: chief stableman, governor of Silistria (now in modern Bulgaria), beylerbey (high governor) of Egypt, beylerbey of Anatolia, Kapudan Pasha (grand admiral), etc. He participated in campaigns around Baghdad in modern Iraq (Capture of Baghdad (1638)) Azov in modern Russia (Siege of Azov (1637–1642)) and Yerevan (now in modern Armenia). During the reign of Sultan Ibrahim, he served in various European provinces as a governor, and in 1646, he became the governor of Chania, Crete (now in Greece).

== Governor of Egypt ==
Hüseyin Pasha was appointed the governor of Egypt Eyalet in 1635, succeeding Bakırcı Ahmed Pasha and serving until 1637. He was reportedly a cruel and violent governor who murdered for sport. From the very first day of his arrival in Egypt, when he confiscated his finance minister and advisors' temporary tents for his own, Hüseyin Pasha began a series of actions that made him widely disliked by the local populace. He brought with him to Egypt a large number of Druzes, who committed robberies in Cairo, the capital, and his men extorted money from the locals for an upcoming feast celebrating his arrival. Hüseyin Pasha was also involved in stealing wealthy locals' inheritances, so much so that it became a reliable way to exact revenge on an enemy by reporting to the Pasha that he or she had received an inheritance from a relative. He also often reportedly rode a horse through crowds of people and animals, swinging a sword, for recreation. Each month, he forced locals to trade in their bullion coin for adulterated metal and sent bureaucrats and officials to remote locations for sport. During his rule, he had over 1,200 people executed, not including those that he killed by his own hand.

Despite his cruelty, Hüseyin Pasha was an able commander and leader of the local troops, which was a particularly difficult task in Egypt. He was attentive to government details in the divan and successfully decreased robbery and burglary in Egypt.

After his dismissal from office in 1637, Sultan Murad IV demanded of him an audit of the Egyptian provincial treasury and public revenues, and for him to pay what he owed to the treasury. When he refused, the kaymakam (acting governor) who replaced him until the arrival of his successor jailed Hüseyin, and he was freed only when he paid a large sum.

== After Egypt ==
During the Baghdat Campaign of Murad IV he was successful in capturing several forts. Sultan forgave him and appointed him as a member of his divan. He later on was appointed as the admiral of the Ottoman fleet. He was able to capture 30 corsair galleys in the Black sea. His next missions were in Ochakiv (now in Ukraine), Baghdad and Budapest.

== Azov ==
Gazi Hüseyin Pasha became the Ochakiv guard for 8 months in 1641. While he was performing this duty, the Azov Fortress was occupied by the Cossacks. The task of saving this fortress was given to Hüseyin Pasha, who was the Ochakiv Guard. Under his command, the Silistra provincial military forces; Kapudan Pasha Siyavuş Pasha, janissary kethüda Haydar Ağazâde, Crimean Khan Bahadır I Giray and the Kefe Governor Yusuf Pasha and their military units laid siege to the Azov Fortress. However, ammunition shortages immediately arose and new supplies did not arrive. In addition, disagreements arose between Kapudan Pasha Siyavuş Pasha and Hüseyin Pasha. For these reasons, the siege lasted only about 3 months. Then, he was forced to abandon the siege, failing.

== Cretan War ==
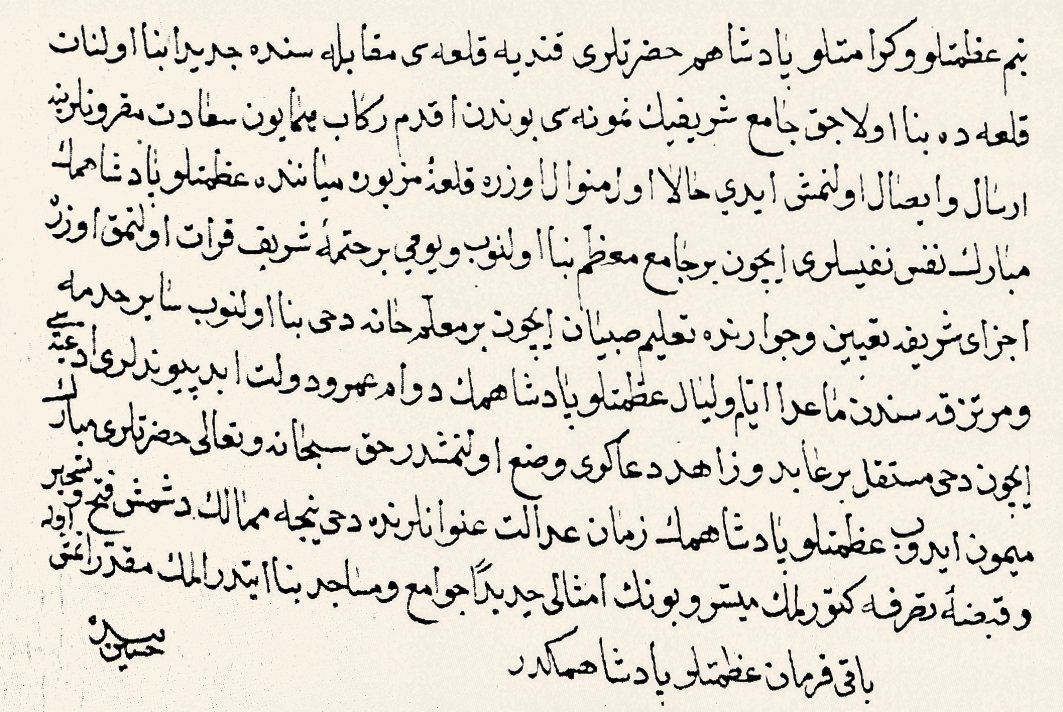
Gazi Hüseyin Pasha's proposal for the construction of a mosque and a teacher's house in Heraklion

Conquest of the Aegean island Crete from Venice was uncharacteristically trying for Ottoman Empire. While the Ottoman Empire was in stagnation, the military and naval technology of the Europeans was on the rise. Although Chania, a major Cretan city, had been captured in 1645, the rest of the island, especially the capital Candia (Heraklion), was able to resist the Ottomans. The Ottoman Empire was unable to send reinforcements to Crete because the strait of Dardanelles (Çanakkale) was blocked by the Venetian navy.

Thus, the Ottoman army in Crete was deadlocked. Even under these circumstances, Hüseyin captured several forts including Rethymno and laid a siege to Heraklion. He also reconstructed many buildings and the fort of Chania. Sultan Mehmed IV promoted him to be the Grand Vizier on 28 February 1656.

However he never exercised the post. Long before Huseyin's return to Constantinople, the sultan changed his mind and appointed Hüseyin's rival Zurnazen Mustafa Pasha as grand vizier on 6 March 1656 (although Zurnazen's term was even shorter than that of Hüseyin).

== Later years ==
Hüseyin was assigned to be the beylerbey (governor) of Rumeli, a post inferior to that of grand vizier, but superior to those of the beylerbeys of other provinces. Nevertheless, the new grand vizier Köprülü Mehmet Pasha was afraid of Hüseyin's prestige. He called Hüseyin to Constantinople and persuaded the sultan to jail and later to execute Hüseyin in 1659.

== See also ==
- List of Ottoman grand viziers
- List of Kapudan Pashas
- List of Ottoman governors of Egypt

Political offices
Preceded by Bakırcı Ahmed Pasha	Ottoman Governor of Egypt; 1635–1637	Succeeded by Sultanzade Mehmed Pasha
Preceded by Ermeni Süleyman Pasha	Grand Vizier of the Ottoman Empire; 28 February 1656 – 5 March 1656	Succeeded by Zurnazen Mustafa Pasha
