= Battle of the Dardanelles (1654) =

1654 naval battle

Coordinates: 40°2′N 26°4′E

First Battle of the Dardanelles
- Part of the Ottoman-Venetian War over Crete
Date	16 May 1654
Location	Dardanelles Straits, NE Aegean Sea
Result	Ottoman victory

Belligerents
Ottoman Empire	Republic of Venice

Commanders and leaders
Kara Murat Pasha	(Republic of Venice) Giuseppe Delfino †

Strength
30 sailing ships 40 galleys 6 galeasses	17 sailing ships 8 galleys 2 galleasses

This battle, which took place on 16 May 1654, was the first of a series of tough battles just inside the mouth of the Dardanelles Strait, as Venice and sometimes the other Christian forces attempted to hold the Turks back from their invasion of Crete by attacking them early. The battle saw an Ottoman armada routing a much smaller Venetian fleet.

== Background ==
Venetian commander Giuseppe Delfino reached the mouth of the Dardanelles on 19 April after a voyage in which he lost approximately 3 ships. His fleet of 17 sailing ships, 2 galleasses and 8 galleys was not large enough or adequately prepared. Murad, the Kapudan Pasha (admiral) left Constantinople with 30 sailing ships, 6 galleasses (known in Turkey as mahons), and 40 galleys on 10 May and reached the Narrows, just above the mouth of the Dardanelles, on 15 May.

== Battle ==
The Ottoman fleet was formed into 3 lines: sailing ships first, then galleasses, then galleys. The next day Delfino attacked. His plan was for his ships to remain at anchor until the Turks passed and then to attack the rear. However, most Venetian ships sailed too soon, leaving Delfinos ship, San Giorgio grande, that of his second, Daniele Morosini, Aquila d'Oro, along with Orsola Bonaventura (Sebastiano Molino), Margarita, 2 galleasses and 2 galleys, without support.

Aquila d'Oro was attacked first, by a large Ottoman ship which she managed to capture, before 5 Turkish vessels came to its rescue. The Ottoman vessel ended up being burnt, leading to the burning of Aquila d'Oro, too. Morosini was taken prisoner as he tried to flee in a boat. The action became more general.

When it was over, the Venetians had lost 2 ships and 1 galley burnt, 1 galley captured, as well as the leader of the galleys, Francesco Morosini, killed, and Daniele Morosini captured. Total casualties were 30 killed and about 40 wounded, although one account had higher figures. Ottoman losses were 2 sailing ships burnt, and perhaps 1 galleass and 1 galley lost.

== Order of battle ==
=== Venice (Giuseppe Delfino) ===
Some were hired Dutch or English ships

San Giorgio grande (flag)
Aquila d'Oro (Dutch Gouden Arend) - Burnt
Concordia (Dutch Eendracht)
Casa di Nassau (Dutch Huys van Nassau)
San Zorzi (Giorgio) piccolo (Dutch Kleene Sint Joris)
Aquila Coronato (Dutch Kronede Arend)
Orsola Bonaventura (English Ursula Bonaventure) - Burnt
Anna Bonaventura (English Anne Bonaventure)
San Michiel
Spirito Santo
Apollo
Margarita
San Giovanni
Conte Sdrin/Conte Desdrin
Genovese grande
Pinco Tremartino
2 galleasses
8 galleys - flag galley of Francesco Morosini burnt, 1 other captured

=== Ottomans (Kara Murat Pasha) ===
30 sailing ships - 2 burnt
6 galleasses - 1 sunk?
40 galleys - 1 sunk?
Reserve fleet guarding retreat of 14 sailing ships and 22 galleys
