= Baltacızade Mustafa Pasha =

Ottoman governor of Egypt (1752–1756)

- بالطاجي زاده مصطفى پاشا

Ottoman Governor of Egypt
- In office 1752/53–1756
- Monarchs: Mahmud I; Osman III
- Preceded by: Seyyid Abdullah Pasha; Divitdar Mehmed Emin Pasha
- Succeeded by: Hekimoğlu Ali Pasha

Ottoman Governor of Morea
- In office 1746–1747
- Monarch: Mahmud I
- Succeeded by: Muhsinzâde Mehmed Pasha

Sanjak-bey of Eğriboz
- In office 1747–1748
- Monarch: Mahmud I

Ottoman Governor of Aydin
- In office 1748–1748
- Monarch: Mahmud I

Sanjak-bey of Candia
- In office 1748–1750
- Monarch: Mahmud I
- In office 1751–1751
- Monarch: Mahmud I
- In office 1752–1752
- Monarch: Mahmud I

Ottoman Governor of Crete
- In office 1750–1751
- Monarch: Mahmud I
- Preceded by: Elçi Mustafa Pasha
- Succeeded by: Ibrahim Pasha

Ottoman Governor of Sidon
- In office 1756–1757
- Monarch: Osman III

Personal details
- Died: 1762 Didymoteicho, Edirne Sanjak, Eyalet of Adrianople, Ottoman Empire

Baltacızade Mustafa Pasha was an Ottoman statesman who served as the governor of the Egypt Eyalet from 1753 to 1756. He was later succeeded by Hekimoğlu Ali Pasha, who served as Grand Vizier of the Ottoman Empire three times.

He also served as the Ottoman governor of Morea Eyalet (1746–47), Sanjak of Eğriboz (1747–48), Aidin Eyalet (1748), Sanjak of Candia (Heraklion, 1748–50, again in 1751 and 1752), Crete Eyalet (1750–51), and Sidon Eyalet (1756–57), according to Sicill-i Osmani. He died in 1762 in Didymoteicho. Öztuna refers to him as Baltacı Mustafa Pasha.
