= Divitdar Mehmed Emin Pasha =

Grand Vizier of the Ottoman Empire from 1750 to 1752

Divitdar Mehmed Emin Pasha ("Mehmed Emin Pasha the Stenographer"; also known as Divitdar Emin Mehmed Pasha or Emin Mehmed Pasha or Muhammad Pasha Amin; died 1753) was an Ottoman statesman who served as grand vizier of the Ottoman Empire from 1750 to 1752. After this, he was exiled to Rethymno on Crete for three years.

After returning from exile, he served as the Ottoman governor of Egypt in 1753. He died either one day (May 1753) or two months (August 1753) in Cairo after taking office as governor of Egypt. He was buried near the shrine and tomb of Al-Shafi‘i.

== See also ==
- List of Ottoman grand viziers
- List of Ottoman governors of Egypt

Political offices
Preceded by Seyyid Abdullah Pasha	Grand Vizier of the Ottoman Empire; 3 January 1750 – 1 July 1752	Succeeded by Köse Bahir Mustafa Pasha
Preceded by Seyyid Abdullah Pasha	Ottoman Governor of Egypt; 1753	Succeeded by Baltacızade Mustafa Pasha
