= Hekimoğlu Ali Pasha =

Grand Vizier of the Ottoman Empire (1732–1735, 1742–1743, 1755)

Grand Vizier of the Ottoman Empire
- In office 15 February 1755 – 18 May 1755
- Monarch: Osman III
- Preceded by: Çorlulu Köse Bahir Mustafa Pasha
- Succeeded by: Naili Abdullah Pasha
- In office 21 April 1742 – 23 September 1743
- Monarch: Mahmud I
- Preceded by: Nişancı Ahmed Pasha
- Succeeded by: Seyyid Hasan Pasha
- In office 12 March 1732 – 12 August 1735
- Monarch: Mahmud I
- Preceded by: Topal Osman Pasha
- Succeeded by: Gürcü Ismail Pasha

Ottoman Governor of Egypt
- In office 1756–1757
- Preceded by: Baltacızade Mustafa Pasha
- Succeeded by: Sa'deddin Pasha al-Azm
- In office 1740–1741
- Preceded by: Sulayman Pasha al-Azm
- Succeeded by: Hatibzade Yahya Pasha

Personal details
- Born: 1689 Constantinople, Ottoman Empire
- Died: 13 August 1758 (aged 68–69) Kütahya, Ottoman Empire
- Relations: Hatibzade Yahya Pasha (son-in-law)
- Origins: Venetian and Turkish

Military service
- Allegiance: Ottoman Empire
- Years of service: 1722–55
- Rank: Serdar (commander; 1732–33, 1742–43, 1755)
- Battles/wars: Ottoman–Persian War (1722–27); Ottoman–Persian War (1730–35); Tahmasp II's campaign of 1731; Siege of Urmia (1731); Siege of Revan (1731); Battle of Kurikan (1731); Austro-Russian–Turkish War (1735–39); Battle of Banja Luka; Capture of Belgrade (1739); Ottoman–Persian War (1743–46)

Hekimoğlu Ali Pasha (1689 – 13 August 1758) was an Ottoman statesman and military leader who served as Grand Vizier of the Ottoman Empire three times.

== Family ==
His father, Nuh, was a Venetian convert to Islam who worked in Constantinople (modern-day Istanbul) as a doctor, and his mother Safiye was a Turk. His epithet Hekimoğlu means "son of a physician" in Turkish.

== Early years ==
Ali worked in various districts (and provinces) of the empire like Zile (in modern-day Tokat Province, Turkey), Yeniil (south of modern-day Sivas Province, Turkey), Adana Eyalet (in modern-day Turkey), Aleppo Eyalet (in modern-day Syria) as a provincial governor. He fought during Ottoman–Persian War (1722–27) and captured Tabriz. After the Treaty of Hamedan in 1727, he worked in Shahrizor Eyalet (in modern-day Iraq) and Sivas. During the new war against Persia, he was appointed as the commander of the front (Turkish: serdar). He captured Urmia and Tabriz (second time).

He was the father-in-law of Hatibzade Yahya Pasha, who succeeded him as the Ottoman governor of Egypt the first time.

== First term as grand vizier ==
During his first term (12 March 1732 – 12 August 1735), he tried to reform the army by establishing a new artillery corps named Humbaracı (Howitzer). For this task he employed a French convert named Claude Alexandre de Bonneval (later known as Humbaracı Ahmed Pasha). He was suspicious of the embattled Russia and tried to end the war against Persia to free up resources, but his peace policy was met with criticism, and, during a council of war held in the palace, Sultan Mahmud I dismissed him.

== After the first term ==
After his first term, Ali Pasha continued as a provincial governor. He was appointed to Crete (in Greece), Bosnia, Egypt, and parts of Anatolia. In Bosnia, he defeated the Austrians at the Battle of Banja Luka during the Austro-Russian–Turkish War (1735–39) and supported the Grand Vizier Ivaz Mehmed Pasha in the siege of Belgrade (1739). In Egypt, he suppressed the uprising of the Mamluks, and his governorship was reported to be largely peaceful and free of insurrections.

== Second term as grand vizier ==
During his second term (21 April 1742 – 23 September 1743), the most important problem was the new war against Persia, still led by Nadir Shah of the Afsharid dynasty. However, the Sultan refused Ali Pasha's campaign plan and dismissed him, accusing him of not taking appropriate measures on the Eastern front.

== After the second term ==
After his second term, he was appointed as provincial governor to Lesbos, Crete, Bosnia, Trikala (in Greece), Ochakiv (in Ukraine), Vidin (in Bulgaria), and Trabzon (in Anatolia) in rapid succession. In Trabzon, he was able to end the chaos created by the local leaders.

== Third term as grand vizier ==
His third term was very short (15 February 1755 – 18 May 1755). The new sultan Osman III was under the influence of the palace courtesans. When Ali Pasha refused to obey the sultan's order to execute a young prince (Turkish: şehzade), the sultan jailed him. He barely escaped being executed by the intercession of the valide sultan (queen mother) Şehsuvar.

== After the third term ==
After being jailed in Kızkulesi (Maiden's Tower) in the Bosphorus, he was first exiled to Mağusa (Famagusta), Cyprus, and then to the island of Rhodes. He was given a pardon in 1756 and appointed as the Ottoman provincial governor to Egypt for the second time. Once again, his governorship was reported to be peaceful. On 17 October 1757, for the fourth time, he was appointed the governor of Anatolia. On 13 August 1758, at the age of about 71, he died in Kütahya of a urinary tract infection.

He is buried in a small monumental tomb near the Hekimoğlu Ali Paşa Mosque at the religious buildings complex that he endowed to be built in the Davutpaşa neighborhood of Istanbul.

== See also ==
- List of Ottoman grand viziers
- List of Ottoman governors of Egypt

Political offices
Preceded by Topal Osman Pasha	Grand Vizier of the Ottoman Empire; 12 March 1732 – 12 August 1735	Succeeded by Gürcü Ismail Pasha
Preceded by Sulayman Pasha al-Azm	Ottoman Governor of Egypt; 1740–1741	Succeeded by Hatibzade Yahya Pasha
Preceded by Nişancı Ahmed Pasha	Grand Vizier of the Ottoman Empire; 21 April 1742 – 23 September 1743	Succeeded by Seyyid Hasan Pasha
Preceded by Çorlulu Köse Bahir Mustafa Pasha	Grand Vizier of the Ottoman Empire; 15 February 1755 – 18 May 1755	Succeeded by Naili Abdullah Pasha
Preceded by Baltacızade Mustafa Pasha	Ottoman Governor of Egypt; 1756–1757	Succeeded by Sa'deddin Pasha al-Azm
