= Seyyid Hasan Pasha =

Grand Vizier of the Ottoman Empire from 1742 to 1746

Grand Vizier of the Ottoman Empire
- In office October 4, 1742 – August 10, 1746
- Monarch: Mahmud I
- Preceded by: Hekimoğlu Ali Pasha
- Succeeded by: Tiryaki Hacı Mehmed Pasha

Personal details
- Died: 1748

Seyyid Hasan Pasha (died 1748) was an Ottoman grand vizier in the 18th century.

He was a Turk from Reşadiye, today in Tokat Province, Turkey. He attended the Janissary corps in Istanbul. After several promotions, he was appointed as the Agha of the Janissaries, the highest rank in the army in 1739. The same year, he took part in the Battle of Grocka, where he distinguished himself as a capable leader and fighter. Three years later, on October 4, 1742, he was appointed as the grand vizier. Although he spent almost four years in the office, he wasn't successful in civil administration and he was dismissed by the sultan on August 10, 1746. However, as was the case for many former grand viziers, he continued as a governor in several different parts of the Ottoman Empire. He became the governor of the island of Rhodes (now in Greece), İçel (modern Mersin Province, Turkey), and Diyarbakır. He died in December 1748.

His son, Seyyid Abdullah Pasha, also served as grand vizier one term after him.

== See also ==
- List of Ottoman grand viziers

Political offices
Preceded by Hekimoğlu Ali Pasha	Grand Vizier of the Ottoman Empire; 4 October 1742 – 10 August 1746	Succeeded by Tiryaki Hacı Mehmed Pasha
