= Naili Abdullah Pasha =

Grand Vizier of the Ottoman Empire (1755)

Grand Vizier of the Ottoman Empire
- In office 19 May 1755 – 24 August 1755
- Monarch: Osman III
- Preceded by: Hekimoğlu Ali Pasha
- Succeeded by: Silahdar Bıyıklı Ali Pasha

Personal details
- Born: Constantinople, Ottoman Empire
- Died: August 1758 Medina, Habesh Eyalet, Ottoman Empire

Naili Abdullah Pasha (died August 1758) was an Ottoman Grand Vizier.

Naili Abdullah, of Turkish descent, was born in Constantinople and took a job in the Ottoman bureaucracy. After several minor posts, he was appointed as the reis ül-küttab (chief of clerks, a post analogous to foreign minister in this period) in 1747, during the reign of Mahmud I. Eight years later, on 19 May 1755, during the reign of Osman III, he was appointed as the Grand Vizier, the highest post of the empire next to that of the Sultan. However, Osman III was a weak sultan and was under the influence of Nişancı Ali Pasha, who was Naili Abdullah's rival. The sultan dismissed Naili Abdullah Pasha after only three months in office on 24 August 1755. He was then appointed as the governor of Crete. Three years later, he was appointed the governor of Jeddah (in modern Saudi Arabia) upon his request. However, he died in Medina on his way to Jeddah in August 1758.

== See also ==
- List of Ottoman grand viziers

Political offices
Preceded by Hekimoğlu Ali Pasha	Grand Vizier of the Ottoman Empire; 19 May 1755 – 24 August 1755	Succeeded by Silahdar Bıyıklı Ali Pasha
