= Ismail Pasha (disambiguation) =

Ismail Pasha may refer to:

- Ayaşlı İsmail Pasha (1620–1690), Ottoman grand vizier (1688)
- Çelebi Ismail Pasha (died 1702), Ottoman governor of Egypt, Rumelia, Sidon, Konya, Anatolia, Damascus, Crete, Baghdad, and Van
- Ismail Pasha al-Azm (r. 1721-1730), Ottoman governor of Damascus and Tripoli
- Ismail Pasha (Tripolitanian) (fl. 1780–1792), Ottoman governor of Egypt and Morea
- Isma'il Kamil Pasha (1795–1826), Egyptian governor of Sudan
- Ismail Selim Pasha (c. 1809–1867), Egyptian general of Greek and Turkish origin
- Isma'il Raghib Pasha (1819–1894), better known as Raghib Pasha, Ottoman politician and Prime Minister of Egypt
- Isma'il Pasha (1830–1895), Egyptian-Albanian Khedive (King and Governor) of Egypt and Sudan (1864–1879)
- Ismail Fazil Pasha (1856–1921), Albanian Ottoman general and politician
- Ismail Sedki Pasha (1875–1950), better known as Isma'il Sidqi, Egyptian politician and Prime Minister
- Ismail Enver Pasha (1881–1922), better known as Enver Pasha, Ottoman military officer of Albanian and Turkish heritage known as Minister of War of Ottoman Empire during WW1.

== See also ==
- Ismail (name)
- Pasha (title)
