= Hekimoğlu Ali Pasha Mosque =

Mosque in Fatih, Istanbul, Turkey

- Hekimoğlu Ali Paşa Camii
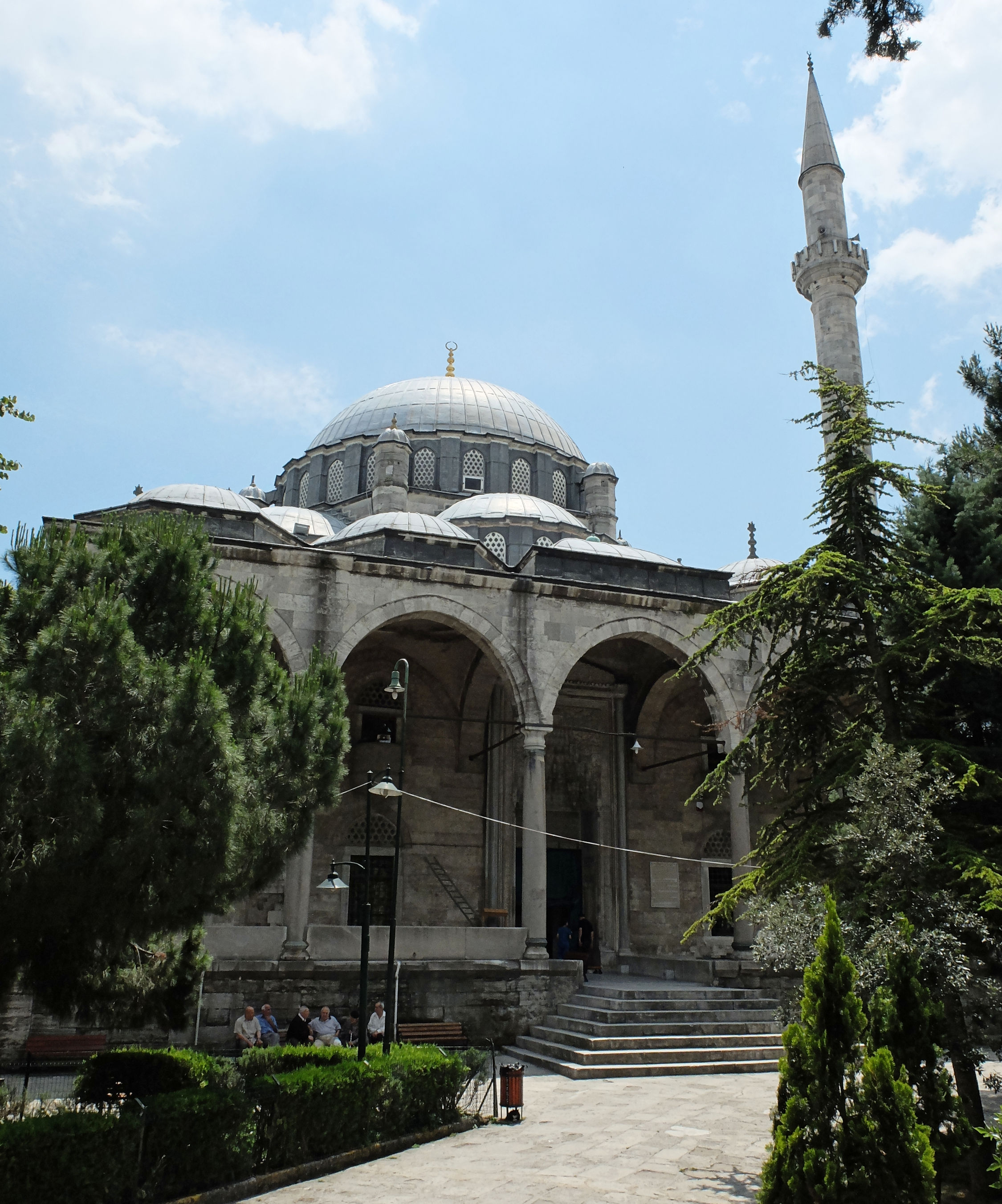

- Location within Istanbul

Religion
- Affiliation: Islam

Location
- Municipality: Fatih, Istanbul
- Country: Turkey
- Interactive map of Hekimoğlu Ali Pasha Mosque
- Coordinates: 41°0′22.17″N 28°56′5.90″E

Architecture
- Architects: Çuhadar Ömer Ağa, Hacı Mustafa Ağa
- Type: mosque
- Style: Classical Ottoman
- Established: 1735

The Hekimoğlu Ali Pasha Mosque (Turkish: Hekimoğlu Ali Paşa Camii) is a mosque in the Fatih district of Istanbul, Turkey. It was commissioned by Hekimoğlu Ali Pasha, who served as grand vizier multiple times from the 1730s to 1750s. The mosque was completed in 1734–1735. It is part of a larger külliye (charitable religious complex) with multiple components, including the founder's tomb. The architects of mosque are Çuhadar Ömer Ağa and Hacı Mustafa Ağa.

== Architecture ==
The mosque complex was built during a transitional period in Ottoman architecture. It is the last major monument of the Classical Ottoman style, marking the end of the Tulip Period stage before the rise of the Ottoman Baroque style in the 1740s. As a result, it has a largely Classical layout, emulating 16th-century mosques, but also displays elements of the newer trends at the time. It is the last Classical-style mosque to employ the hexagonal baldaquin design, meaning that the central dome is supported by six main pillars arranged in a hexagonal layout around the mosque.

The mosque forms part of a külliye complex that consists of a khanqah, a türbe (tomb), a shadirvan, a library, a sebil, and a primary school. It is the last major monument of the Tulip Period stage in Ottoman architecture and the last representative of the "classical" Ottoman style. The mosque reflects an overall classical form and is very similar to the nearby Cerrah Pasha Mosque (late 16th century), but the flexible placement of the various components of the complex around a garden enclosure is more reflective of the new changes in tastes. For example, the main gate of the complex is topped by a library, a feature which would have been unusual in earlier periods. It also has a very ornate sebil positioned at the street corner, next to the founder's tomb.

The mosque is the last to employ an "hexagonal baldaquin" design, meaning that the main dome is supported by six pillars or buttresses arranged in a hexagon formation, with semi-domes occupying the spaces between the pillars. The interior of the mosque is light and decorated with tiles from the Tekfursaray kilns, which were of lesser quality than those of the earlier Iznik period. One group of tiles is painted with an illustration of the Great Mosque of Mecca, a decorative feature of which there were multiple examples in this period.

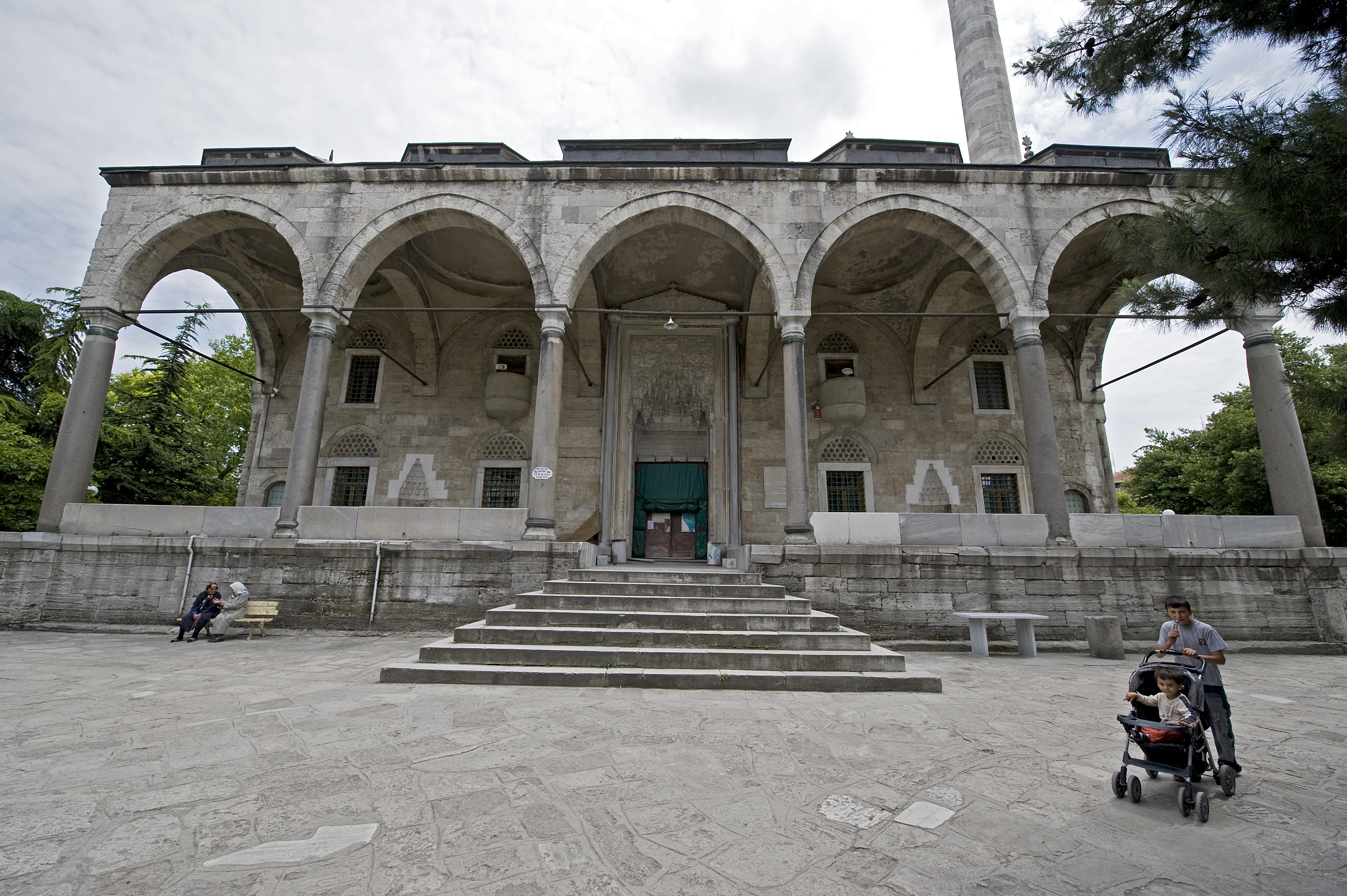
Front portico of the mosque

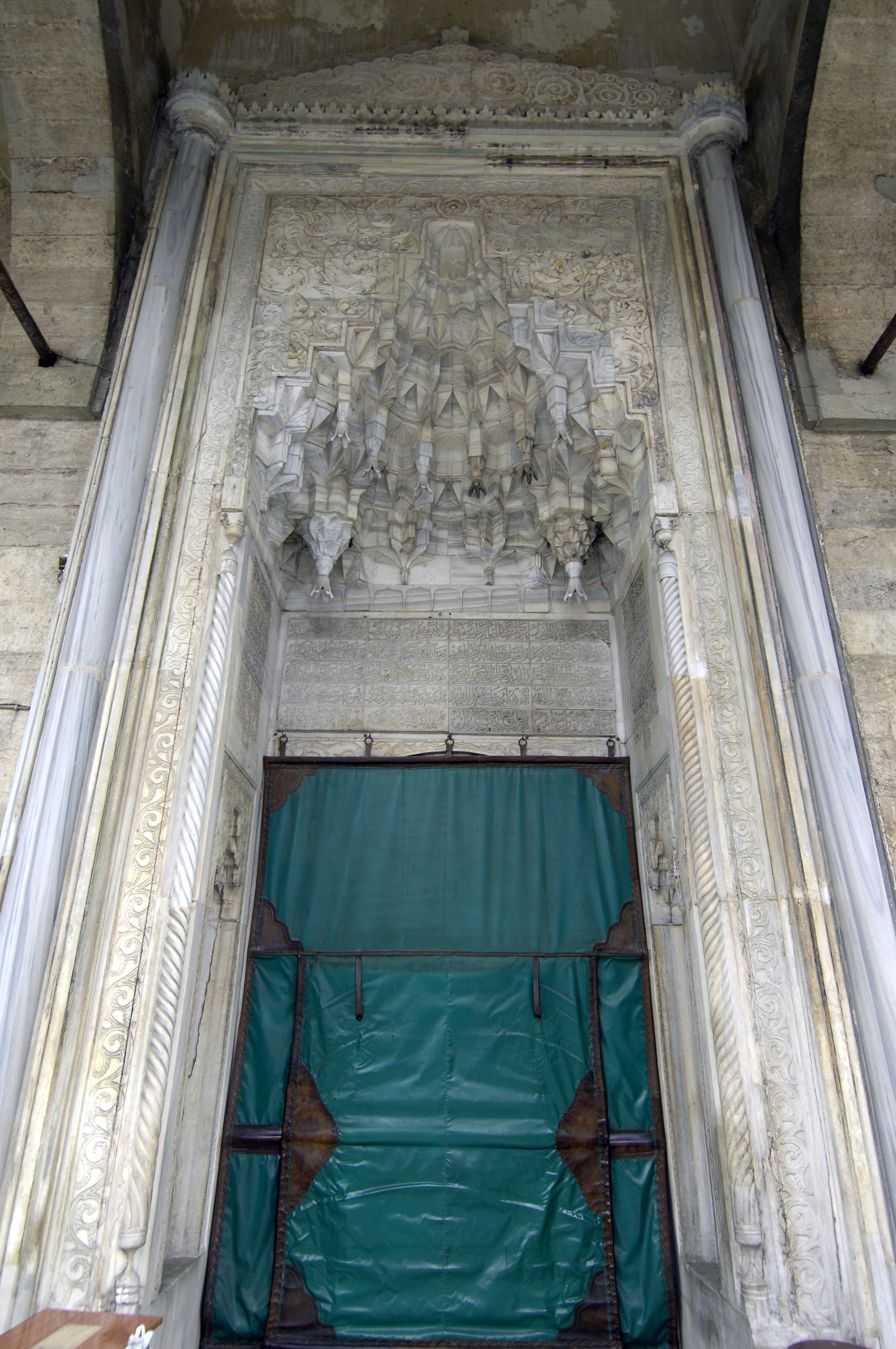
Main entrance portal of the mosque

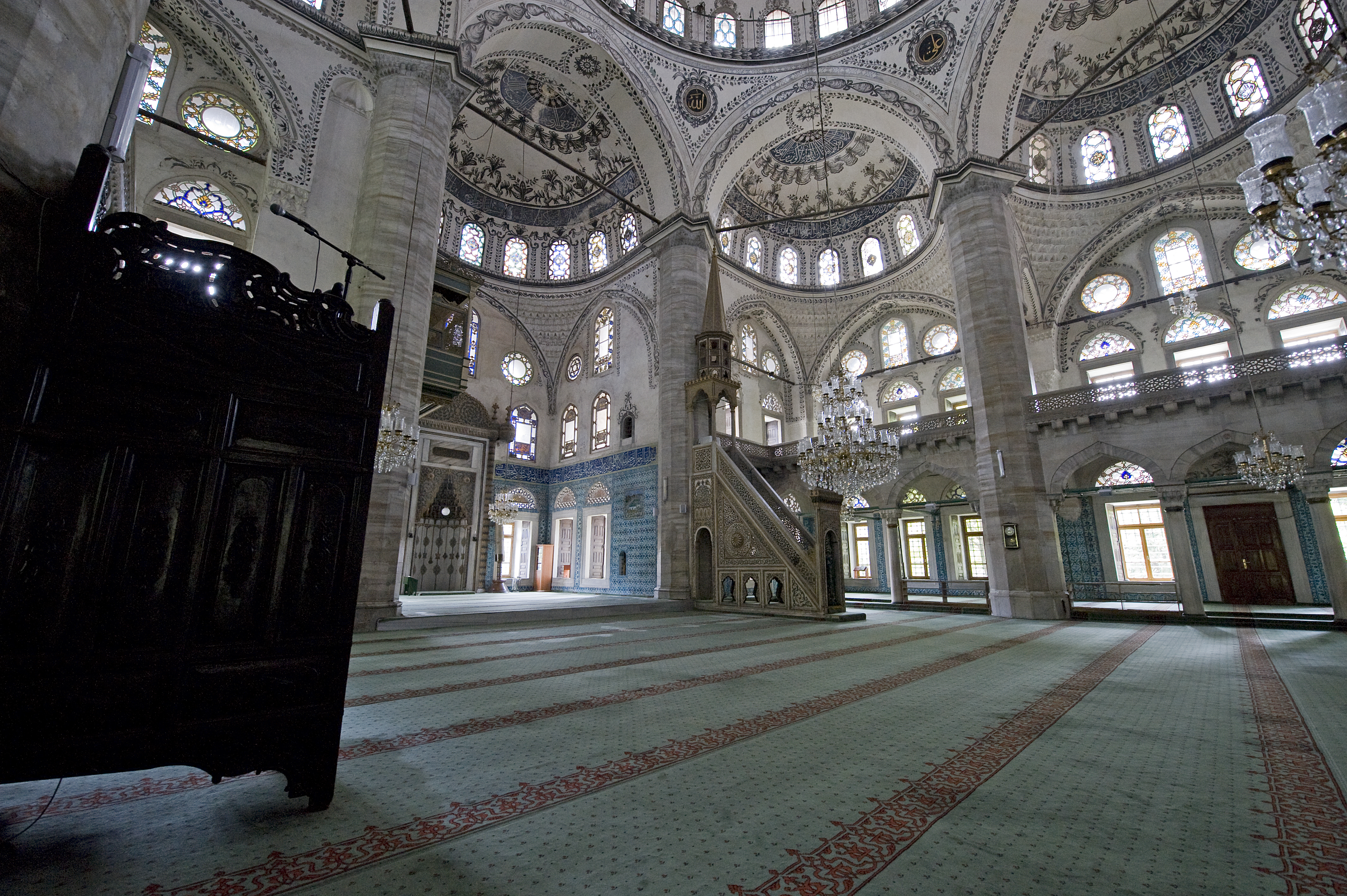
Interior of the mosque

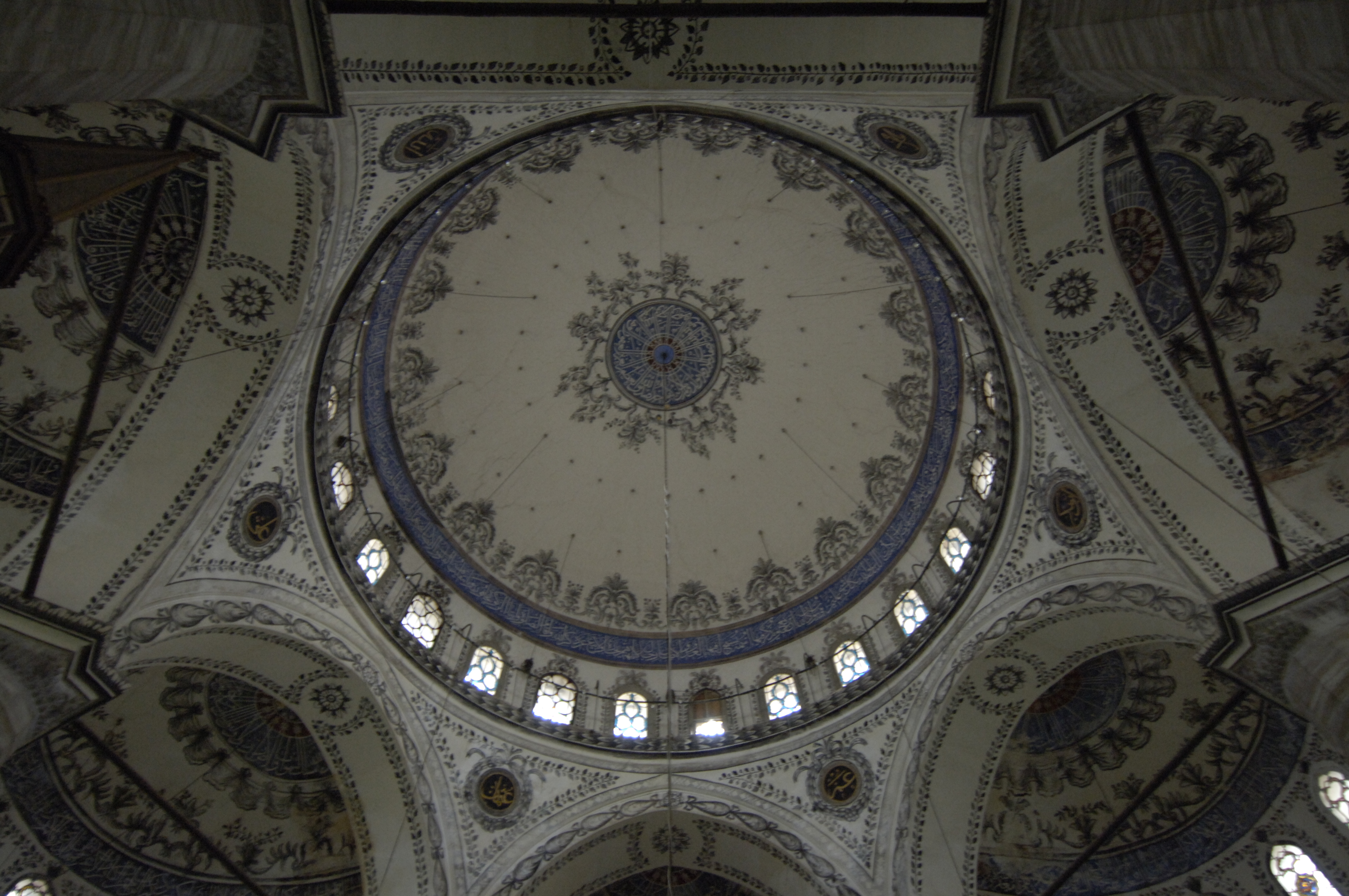
Main dome of the mosque

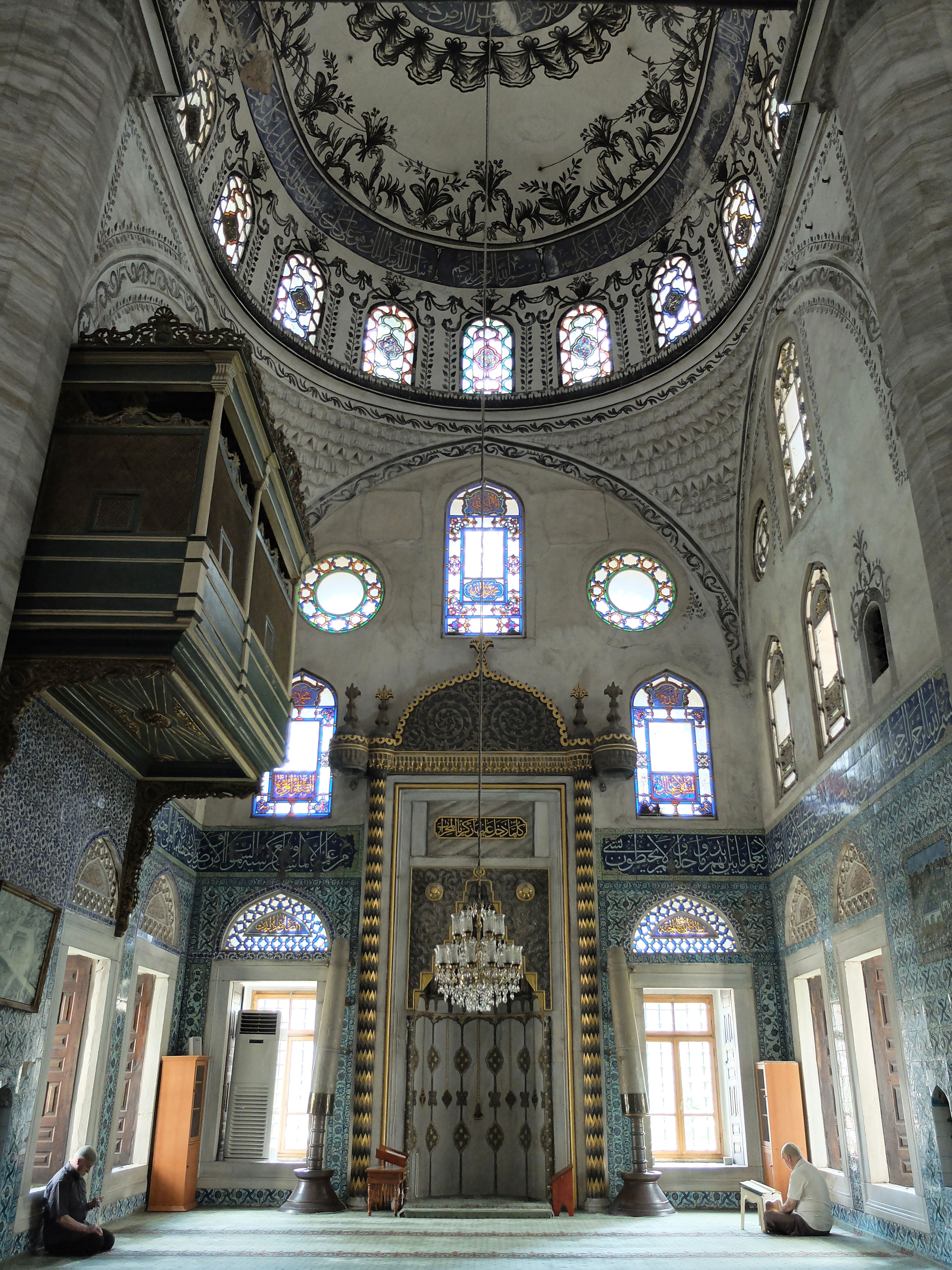
View of the mosque's mihrab (center) and the sultan's loge (upper left)

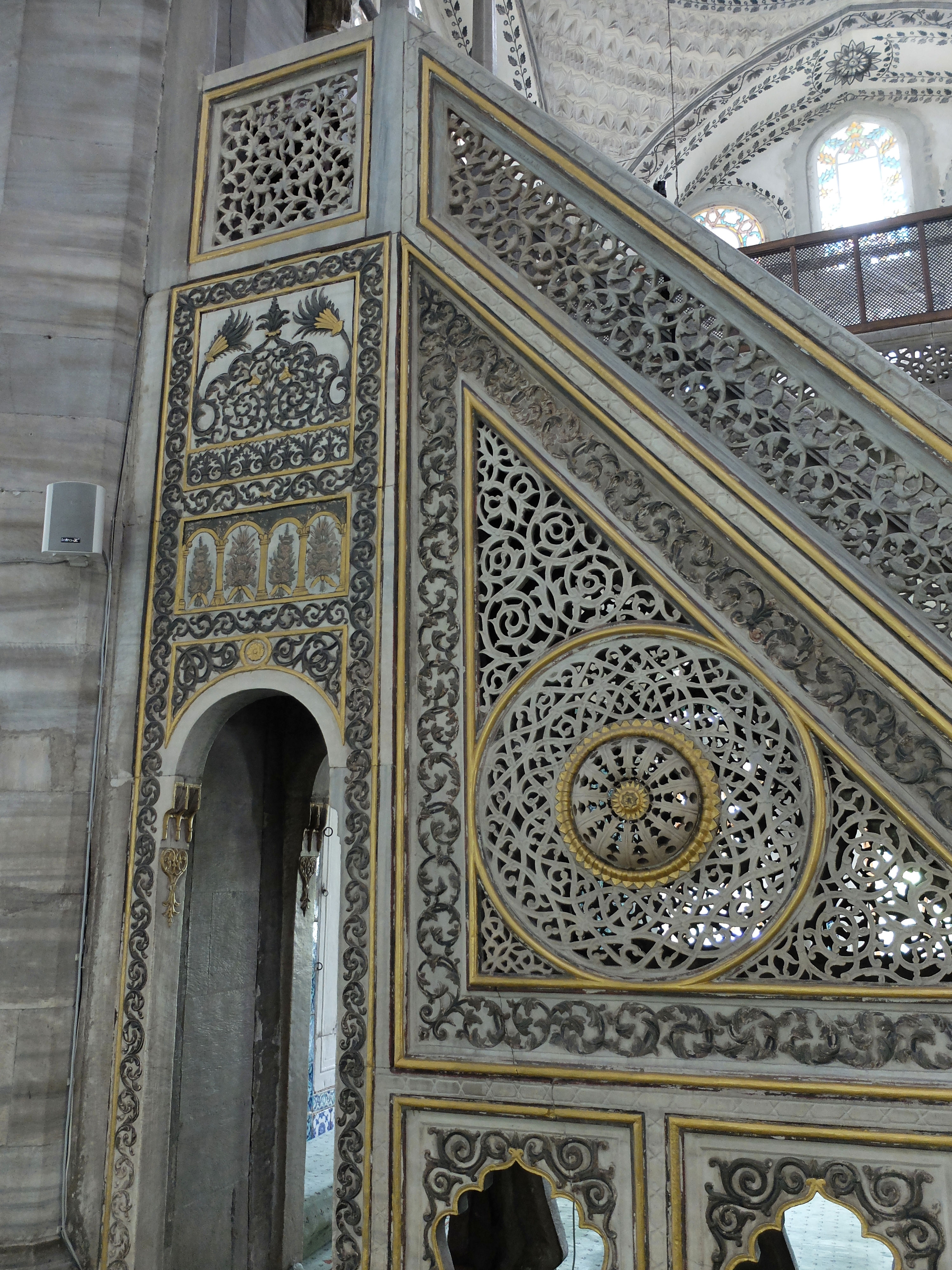
Detail of the mosque's minbar

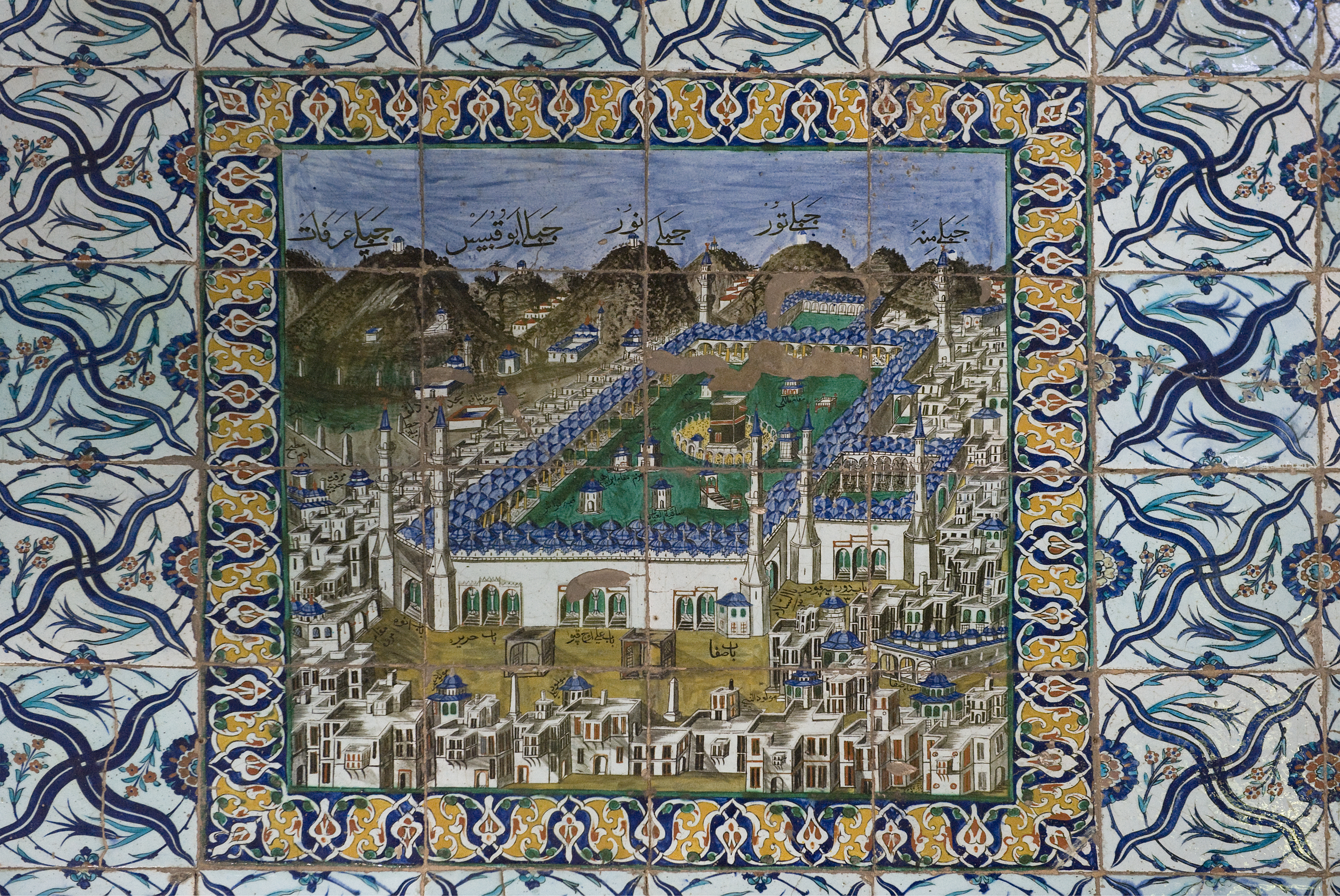
Tekfursaray tile decoration including depiction of Mecca

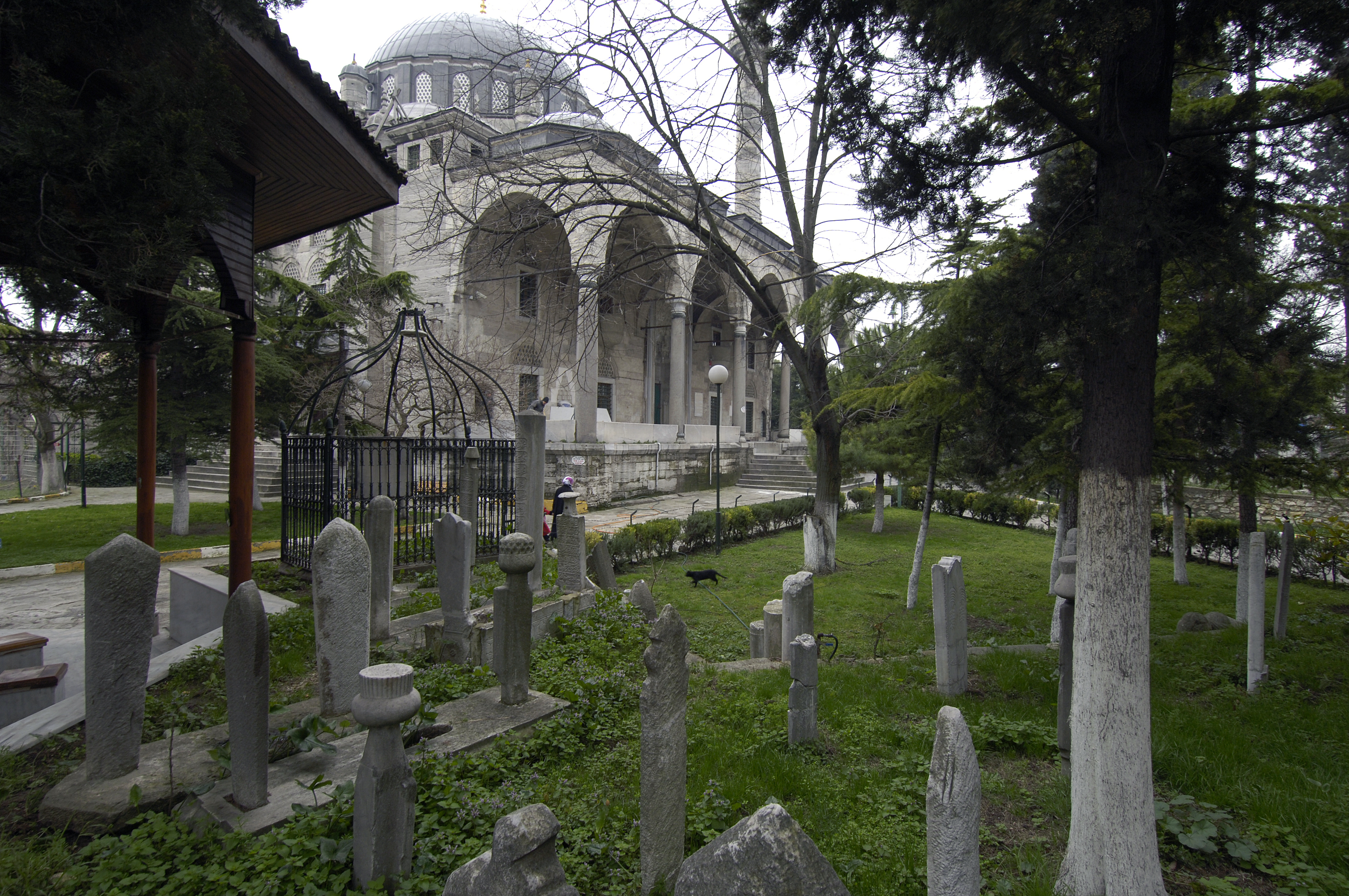
Cemetery inside the mosque enclosure

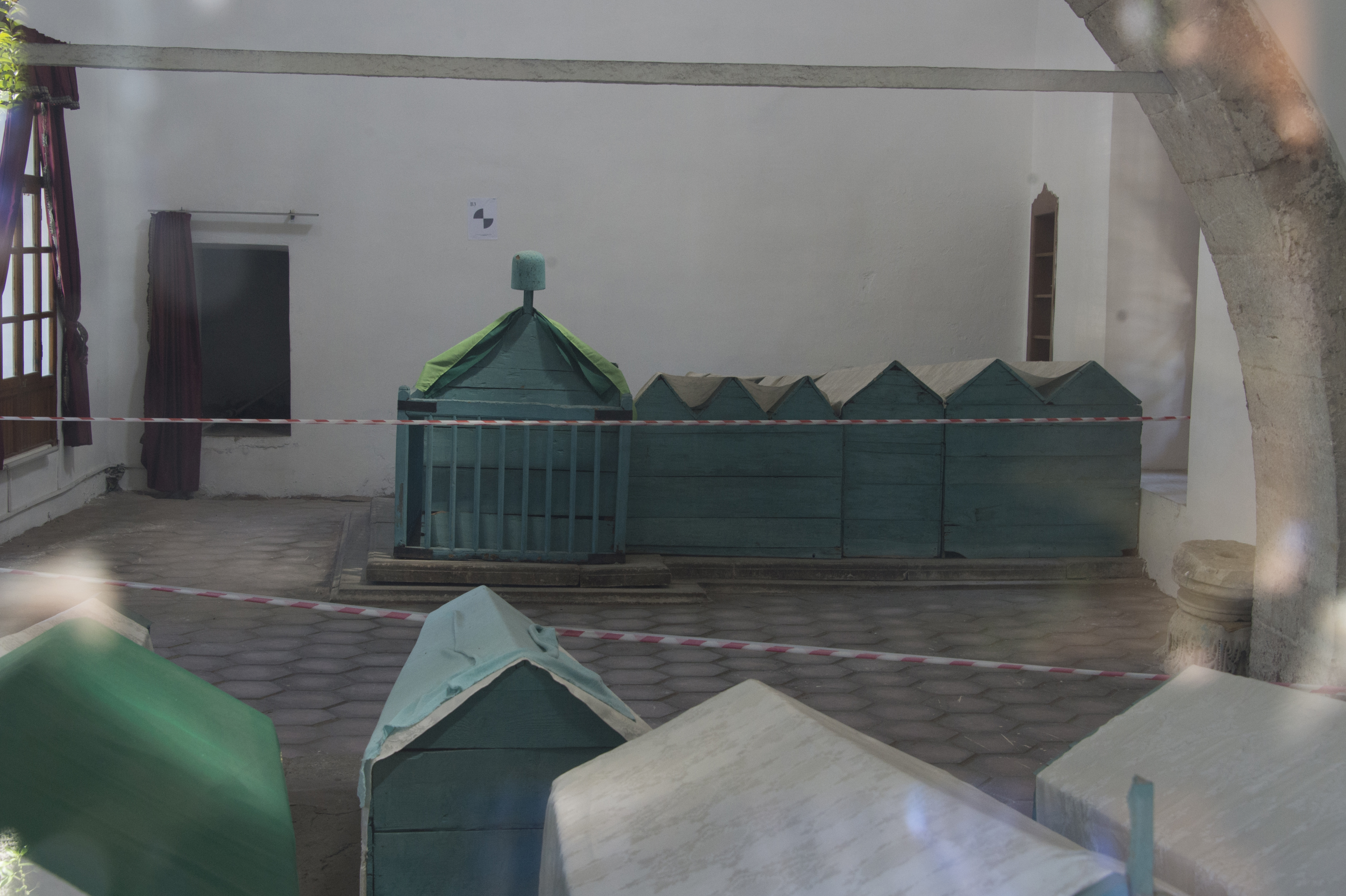
Interior of the tomb

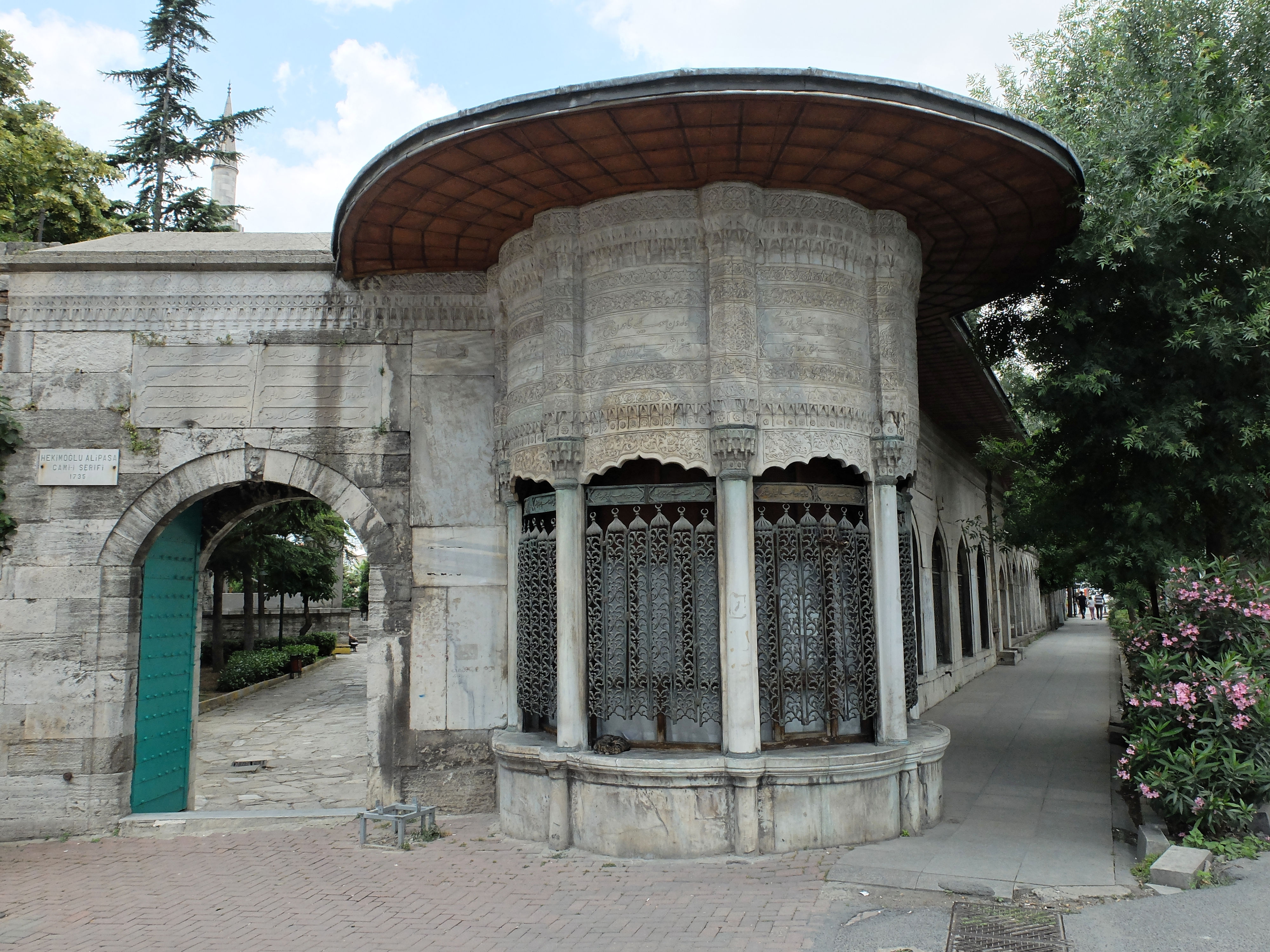
Sebil and eastern entrance of the complex

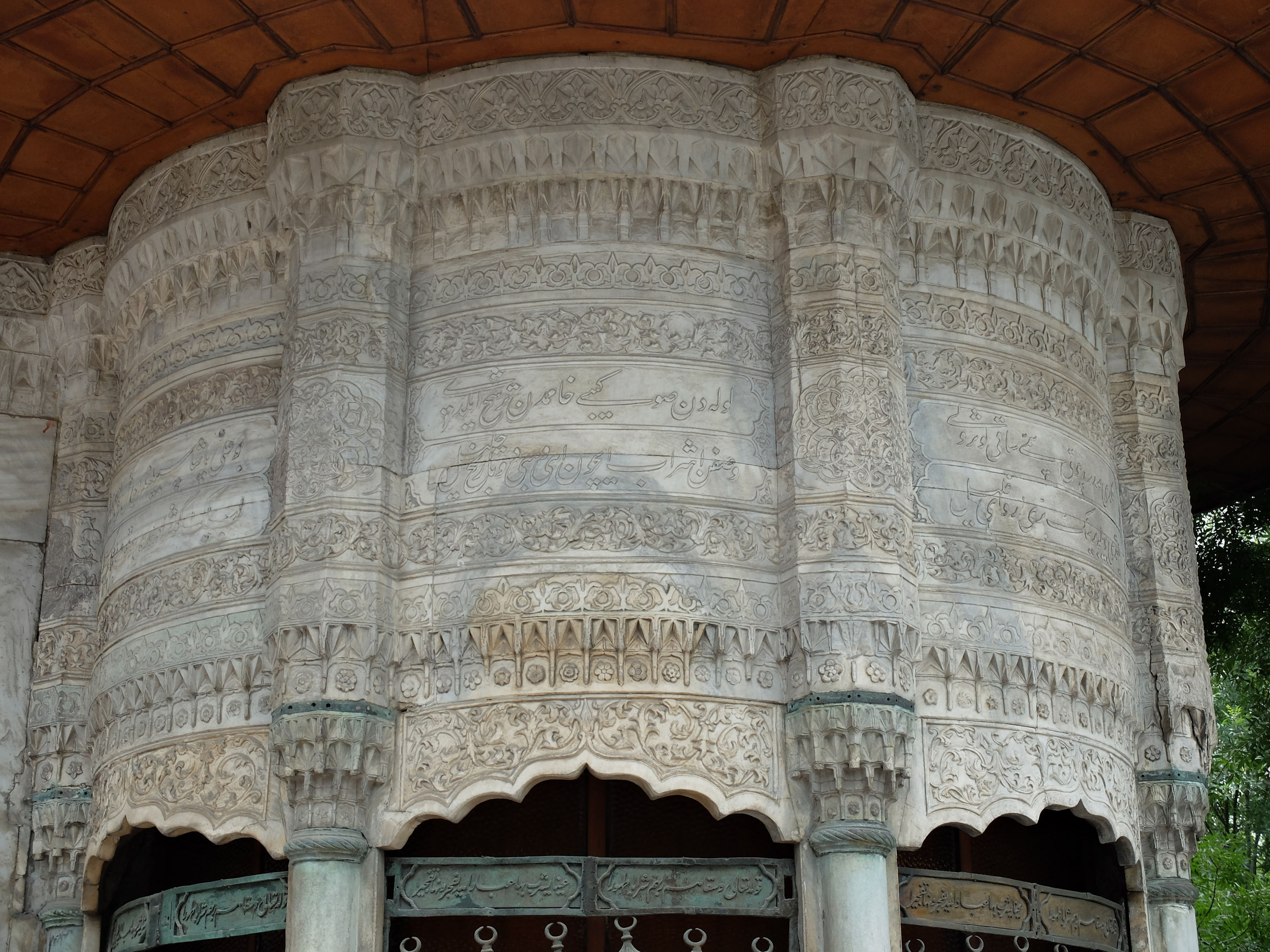
Detail of the sebil's Tulip Period-style decoration

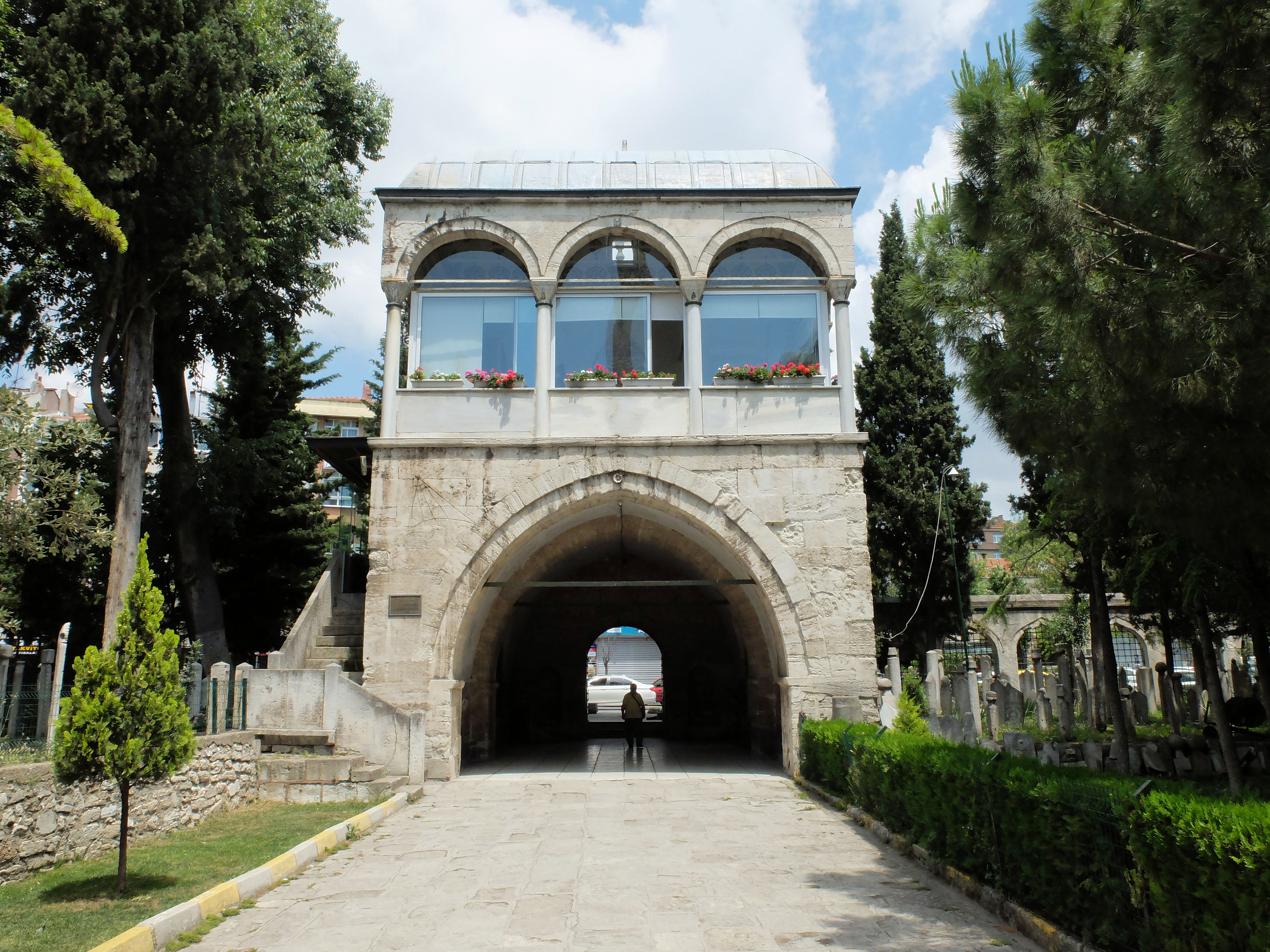
Main north gate of the complex, with library chamber built above it

== See also ==
- List of mosques in Turkey

== Bibliography ==
- Carswell, John (2006). Iznik Pottery (Second ed.). British Museum Press. ISBN 9780714124414.
- Goodwin, Godfrey (1971). A History of Ottoman Architecture. Thames & Hudson. ISBN 0-500-27429-0.
- Kuban, Doğan (2010). Ottoman Architecture. Translated by Mill, Adair. Antique Collectors' Club. ISBN 9781851496044.
- Rüstem, Ünver (2019). Ottoman Baroque: The Architectural Refashioning of Eighteenth-Century Istanbul. Princeton University Press. ISBN 9780691181875.
- Sumner-Boyd, Hilary; Freely, John (2010). Strolling Through Istanbul: The Classic Guide to the City (Revised ed.). Tauris Parke Paperbacks.
