= Hatibzade Yahya Pasha =

Ottoman governor

Hatibzade Yahya Pasha (known by contemporaries as just Yahya Pasha; died August 1755) was an Ottoman statesman and admiral. He served as Kapudan Pasha (grand admiral) of the Ottoman Navy briefly in 1743 (May to November), as well as serving as the Ottoman governor of Trabzon (1735–36), Ochakiv (1736–37), Bursa (1741), Egypt (1741–43), Rumelia (1746–48, again in 1748 and 1754–55), Aydın (1748), Mosul (1748), Diyarbekir (1748–49), Anatolia (1749–53), Vidin (1753–54), Ioannina (1755), and Trikala (1755).

While Yahya Pasha was governor of Ochakiv in 1737, the Russians laid siege to it and captured it, as part of the Austro-Russian–Turkish War, taking him prisoner. He was freed in 1740.

He was the son-in-law of grand vizier Hekimoğlu Ali Pasha, who also served as his predecessor as governor of Egypt. Later, he married Saliha Sultan, a daughter of Sultan Ahmed III. He had a fountain built in Istanbul bearing his name (Turkish: Hatipzâde Yahya Paşa Çeşmesi). His epithet, Hatipzade, means "son of a preacher" in Turkish.

== See also ==
- List of Ottoman governors of Egypt
- List of Ottoman governors of Mosul

Political offices
| Preceded by Hekimoğlu Ali Pasha | Ottoman Governor of Egypt; 1741–1743 | Succeeded by Yedekçi Mehmed Pasha |
