= Cretan Revolt (1841) =

Revolt of Greeks in Crete against the Ottoman Empire (1841)

- Part of the Aftermath of the Egyptian–Ottoman War (1839–1841)
Date	1841
Location	Eyalet of Crete, Ottoman Empire
Result	Ottoman victory

Belligerents
Greek rebels of Crete	Ottoman Empire

Commanders and leaders
Vasileios Chalis; Ioannis Koumis; Emmanouil Patelaros; Anagnostis Tsouderios; Emmanouil Deiktatis; Aristeidis Chaireti; Charidimos Chaireti; Aleksandros Koumoundouros	(Ottoman Empire) Jusuf Bey of Berat

Strength
Unknown	6,000 Albanian mercenaries

Casualties and losses
Unknown	Unknown

The Cretan Revolt of 1841 was one of many revolutions of the local Greeks to free themselves from the Ottoman Empire.

The context of the rebellion was what is known as the Eastern Question and more specifically during the Egyptian-Ottoman War of 1839–1841, where Muhammad Ali's forces forced the Ottoman army to retreat at the Battle of Nezib. This made an attack on the Ottoman capital, Istanbul (Constantinople), through Syria possible, which went against the Great Power's interests of maintaining the Ottoman Empire. After the Great Power's intervention on the matter, there was a possibility that Crete would join the newly formed Kingdom of Greece, at first through diplomatic means. However, military intervention by the Kingdom of Greece was also considered, as the crisis had lifted the Greek people's spirits, who wanted to liberate their fellow Greeks, by any means necessary. There were two requests made by the Committee of Exiled Cretans, in late 1838 and 10 August 1839, which requested the island be temporarily occupied by British forces, but both were ignored.

The Greek government would later go on to sign a trade treaty with the Ottoman Empire, hampering the hopes of the Cretans to get assistance from Greece itself. Furthermore, with the Convention of London, signed 15 July 1840, the United Kingdom, France, Russia and Prussia decided to recognise the Ottoman control of the island. Knowing that if this convention were to be ratified, hopes of unification with Greece or independence would be crushed, a handful of exiled Cretans, Vasileios Chalis, Ioannis Koumis, Emmanouil Patelaros, Anagnostis Tsouderios, Emmanouil Deiktatis, Aristeidis and Charidimos Chaireti and Aleksandros Koumoundouros, communicated with local guerillas and had all gone to Crete by late 1840. After a short period of preparation, they declared the revolution, on 22 February 1841.

The Turkish governor originally wanted to make peace with the rebels, however he later sent troops to the main areas of rebel concentration and managed to suppress the rebellion. The rebels stood alone, with the foreign powers and Greece having refused to aid them in their effort, and so they lost, having sustained heavy casualties, at the battles of Provarma, Vafe, Ksida and Vryses, with the remaining rebel leaders fleeing for Greece, taking with them women and children.
