= Çelebi Ismail Pasha =

Ottoman statesman

Çelebi Ismail Pasha (died November or December 1702) was an Ottoman statesman who held various administrative roles in his career as a high-level official in the Ottoman government.

He began his career as a soldier in the Janissary corps of the Ottoman army. He eventually became the agha (head) of the Janissaries in July or August 1692, holding the position until the end of that year or the next year (1693). He was described as "tall and handsome" and could not read or write.

Ismail Pasha's was the Ottoman governor of:

- Rumelia Eyalet (1685–?)
- Sidon Eyalet (?–1689/90)
- Karaman Eyalet (1689/90 – 1691/92)
- Anatolia Eyalet (1691/92)
- Damascus Eyalet (1692–1693)
- Crete Eyalet (1693–1695)
- Egypt Eyalet (Oct. 1695 – Sep. 1697)
- Baghdad Eyalet (Oct./Nov. 1697 – 1699)
- Van Eyalet (1699–1701)

== As governor of Egypt ==
One of the first things that Ismail Pasha did after he was appointed the governor of Egypt and had arrived in Cairo in October 1695 was to reveal to the kaymakam (acting governor) Ibrahim Bey, who had occupied the position until Ismail Pasha's arrival in Egypt, that the sultan Mustafa II had ordered him to close the deficit in the Egypt provincial treasury by whatever means possible. He accomplished this by assigning a local Hasan Bey to do the job, who managed to break even and even create a surplus in the treasury. He also settled the accounts of his predecessor as governor, Hazinedar Moralı Ali Pasha, and after he had paid them, allowed him to return to Constantinople, the Ottoman capital.

Ismail Pasha had a taqiya (a worship building for dervishes) built in the Kara Meydan square of the Cairo Citadel, from which Ottoman governors ruled. In 1696, he organized an elaborate and massive celebration and feast for his sons, who were just circumcised, that lasted for 15 days.

He was deposed by the local soldiers in September 1697, and the acting governor became Kesici Hasan Pasha. Ismail Pasha then headed an expedition to Baghdad. After this event, a local Arab source claims that the sultan then sent an order for Ismail Pasha's execution and that he defected to Persia to escape. However, another source, the 19th-century Ottoman Turkish historian Mehmet Süreyya Bey, claims that he became the Ottoman governor of Baghdad, and then of Van, and makes no mention of an execution order.

== See also ==
- List of Ottoman governors of Egypt
- List of Ottoman governors of Damascus
- List of Ottoman governors of Crete

Political offices
Preceded by Hazinedar Moralı Ali Pasha	Ottoman Governor of Egypt; 1695–1697	Succeeded by Firari Hüseyin Pasha
