= Seyyid Abdullah Pasha =

Grand Vizier of the Ottoman Empire from 1747 to 1750

Seyyid Abdullah Pasha (also known as Boynueğri Seyyid Abdullah Pasha "Seyyid Abdullah Pasha the Crooked-neck"; died March 1761, Aleppo) was an Ottoman statesman who served as grand vizier from 1747 to 1750. He also served as the Ottoman governor of Cyprus (1745–46, again in 1746–47), Rakka (1746), Konya (1750), Bosnia (1750–51), Egypt (1751–52), Diyarbekir (1752–60), and Aleppo (1760).

Abdullah Pasha was born in Kirkuk, the son of Blond Seyyid Hasan-aga, who served as grand sheyhulislam of the Ottoman Empire before him. He attended the Enderun palace school as a youth and became a vizier in December 1745.

He died in office as governor of Aleppo in March 1760.

== See also ==
- List of Ottoman grand viziers
- List of Ottoman governors of Egypt
- List of Ottoman governors of Bosnia

Political offices
Preceded by Tiryaki Hacı Mehmed Pasha	Grand Vizier of the Ottoman Empire; 24 August 1747 – 2 January 1750	Succeeded by Divitdar Mehmed Emin Pasha
Preceded by Ebubekir Pasha	Ottoman Governor of Bosnia; 1750–1751	Succeeded by Köprülü Hacı Ahmed Pasha
Preceded by Nişancı Ahmed Pasha	Ottoman Governor of Egypt; 1751–1752	Succeeded by Divitdar Mehmed Emin Pasha
