= Ottoman Crete =

Province of the Ottoman Empire from 1646 to 1913

Ottoman Crete Eyālet-i Girīt (1667–1867) Vilayet-i Girit (1867–1898) Girit Devleti (1898-1913)
- 1667–1913
- Flag

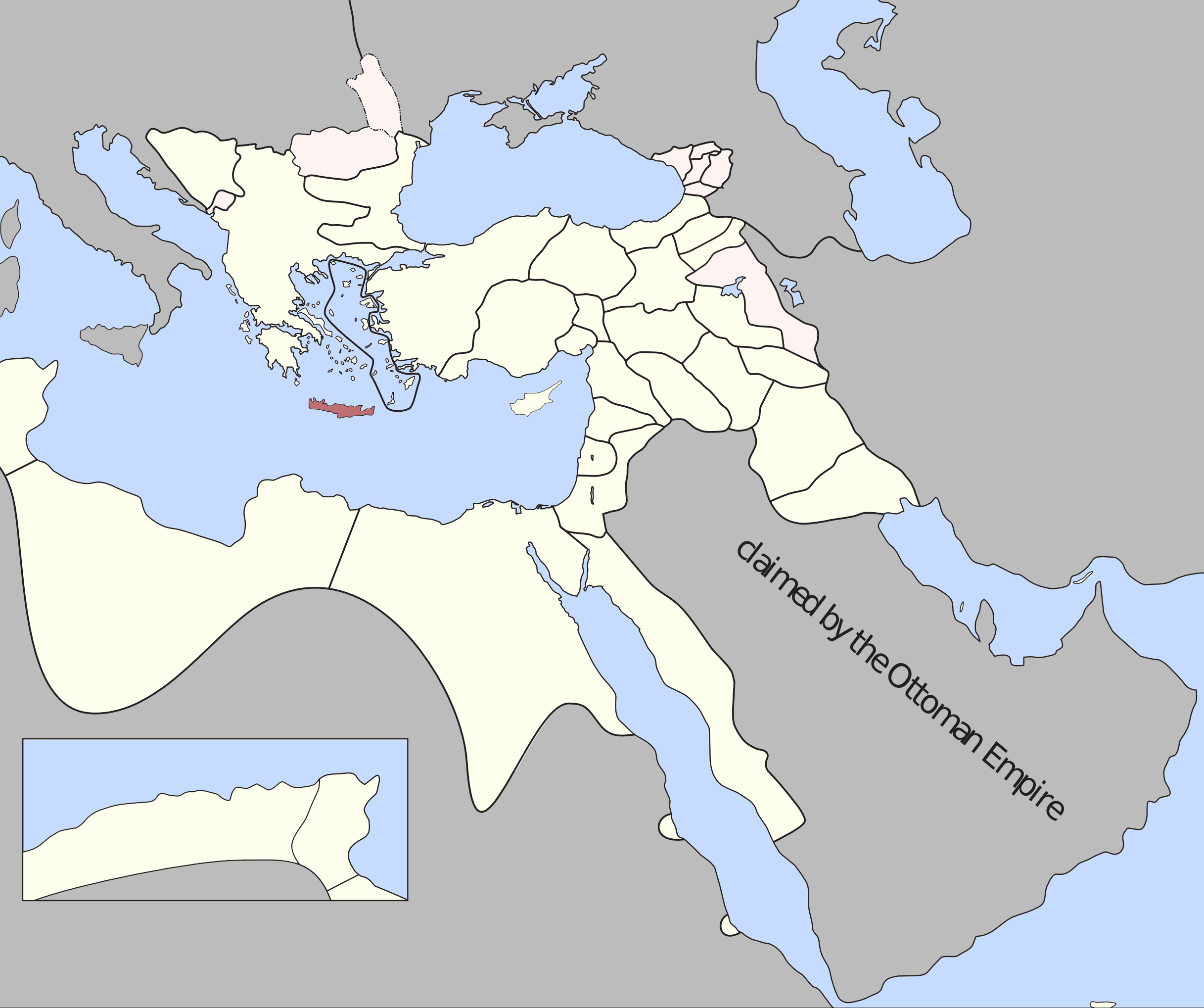
- Crete within the Ottoman Empire in 1795

- Administral divisions in 1670
- Capital: Kandiye (1669–1850); Kanea (1850–1913); 35°20′N 25°8′E
- Wali
  - 1693-1695: Çelebi Ismail Pasha
  - 1898: Shakir Pasha
- History
  - Established: 1667
  - Treaty of London: 1913

Area
- 1876: 7,800 km^{2} (3,000 sq mi)

Population
  - 1870: 280,000
  - 1876: 220,000
| Preceded by | Succeeded by |
| Kingdom of Candia | Cretan State |
- Today part of: Greece

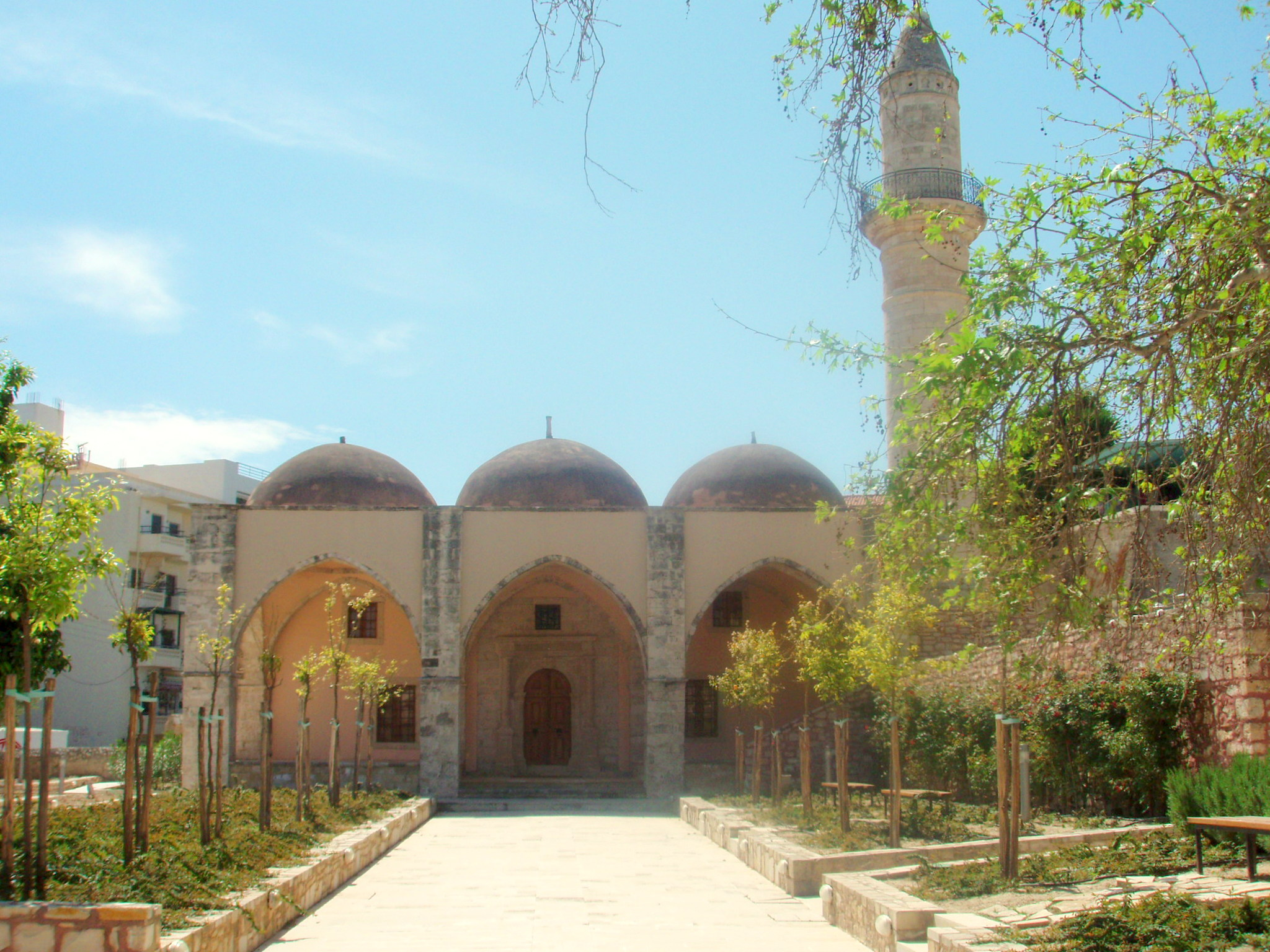
Veli Pasha mosque in Rethymno

The island of Crete (Ottoman Turkish: كریت, romanized: Girit) was declared an Ottoman province (eyalet) in 1646, after the Turks conquered the western part of the island as part of the Cretan War, but the Venetians maintained their hold on the capital Candia, until 1669, when Francesco Morosini surrendered the keys of the town. The offshore island fortresses of Souda, Grambousa, and Spinalonga would remain under Venetian rule until 1715, when they were also captured by Turks.

Crete took part in the Greek War of Independence, but the local uprising was suppressed with the aid of Muhammad Ali of Egypt. The island remained under Egyptian control until 1840, when it was restored to full Ottoman authority. After the Cretan Revolt (1866–1869) and especially the Pact of Halepa in 1878, the island received significant autonomy, but Ottoman violations of the autonomy statutes and Cretan aspirations for eventual union with the Kingdom of Greece led to the Cretan Revolt (1897–1898) and the Greco-Turkish War (1897). Despite an Ottoman victory in the war, Crete became an autonomous state in 1898 because of intervention in favour of Greece by European powers and was united with Greece after the Balkan Wars.

== History ==
During the Cretan War (1645–1669), Venice was pushed out of Crete by the Ottoman Empire. Most of the island fell in the first years of the war, but the capital Candia (Heraklion) held out during a long siege, which lasted from 1648 to 1669, possibly the second-longest siege in history, two years shorter than the First Siege of Ceuta. The last Venetian outposts, the island fortresses of Souda, Gramvousa and Spinalonga, fell in the Ottoman–Venetian War (1714–1718).

=== Rebellions against Ottoman rule ===
There were significant rebellions against Ottoman rule, particularly in Sfakia.

Daskalogiannis was a famous rebel leader who in 1770 led a heroic but foredoomed revolt, which did not get the expected aid from the Russians, who had instigated it (see Orlov Revolt).

The Greek War of Independence began in 1821, and Cretan participation was extensive. An uprising by Christians met with a fierce response from the Ottoman authorities and the execution of several bishops who were regarded as ringleaders. Between 1821 and 1828, the island was the scene of repeated hostilities. The Muslims were driven into the large fortified towns on the north coast, and it would appear that as many as 60% of them died from plague or famine there. The Cretan Christians also suffered severely by losing around 21% of their population. During the great massacre of Heraklion on 24 June 1821, remembered in the area as "the great ravage" ("ο μεγάλος αρπεντές", "o megalos arpentes"), the Turks also killed the metropolite of Crete, Gerasimos Pardalis, and five more bishops.

As Ottoman Sultan Mahmud II had no army of his own available, he was forced to seek the aid of his rebellious vassal and rival, Muhammad Ali of Egypt, who sent an expedition to the island. In 1825, Muhammad Ali's son, Ibrahim, landed in Crete and began to massacre the majority-Greek community.

Britain decided that Crete should not become part of the new Kingdom of Greece on its independence in 1830, evidently for fear that it would become a centre of piracy, as it had often been in the past, or a Russian naval base in the East Mediterranean. Rather than being included in the new Greek state, Crete was administered by Mustafa Naili Pasha (known as Mustafa Pasha), whose rule attempted to create a synthesis of Muslim landowners and the emergent Christian commercial classes.

Though subsequent Greek nationalist historiography has portrayed the Pasha as an oppressive figure, as reported by British and French consular observers, he seems to have been generally cautious and pro-British and to have tried harder to win the support of the Cretan Christians (having married the daughter of a priest and allowed her to remain Christian) than the Cretan Muslims. In 1834, however, a Cretan committee was set up in Athens to work for the union of the island with Greece.

In 1840, Egypt was forced by Palmerston to return Crete to direct Ottoman rule. Mustafa Pasha angled unsuccessfully to become a semi-independent Prince of Greece, but the Christian Cretans instead of supporting him, rebelled and once more drove the Muslims temporarily into siege in the towns. An Anglo-Ottoman naval operation, restored control in the island and Mustafa Pasha was confirmed as the governor of the island but under command from Constantinople. He remained there until 1851 when he was summoned to Constantinople, where, despite relatively advanced age (his early fifties) he had a successful career, he became grand vizier several times.

After Greece had achieved its independence, Crete became an object of contention, as the Christian part of its population revolted several times against Ottoman rule. Revolts in 1841 and in 1858 secured some privileges, such as the right to bear arms, equality of Christian and Muslim worship and the establishment of Christian councils of elders with jurisdiction over education and customary law. Despite those concessions, the Christian Cretans maintained their ultimate aim of union with Greece, and tensions between the Christian and Muslim communities ran high. In 1866, the Cretan Revolt this began.

The uprising, which lasted for three years, involved volunteers from Greece and other European countries, where it was viewed with considerable sympathy. Despite early successes of the rebels, who quickly confined the Ottomans to the northern towns, the uprising failed. Ottoman Grand Vizier 'Aali Pasha personally assumed control of the Ottoman forces and launched a methodical campaign to retake the rural districts, which was combined with promises of political concessions, notably by the introduction of an Organic Law, which gave the Cretan Christians equal (in practice, because of their superior numbers, majority) control of local administration. His approach bore fruits, as the rebel leaders gradually submitted. By early 1869, the island was again under Ottoman control. The island was made a vilayet with a special status with a firman dated 18 September 1867.

During the Congress of Berlin in the summer of 1878, there was a further rebellion, which was halted quickly by the intervention of the British and the adaptation of the 1867-8 Organic Law into a constitutional settlement, known as the Pact of Halepa. Crete became a semi-independent parliamentary state within the Ottoman Empire under an Ottoman governor, who had to be a Christian. A number of the senior "Christian Pashas", including Photiades Pasha and Kostis Adosidis Pasha, ruled the island in the 1880s and presided over a parliament in which liberals and conservatives contended for power. Disputes between the two powers, however, led to a further insurgency in 1889 and the collapse of the Pact of Halepa arrangements. The international powers, disgusted at what seemed to be factional politics, allowed the Ottoman authorities to send troops to the island and to restore order but did not anticipate that Ottoman Sultan Abdul Hamid II would use that as a pretext to end the Halepa Pact Constitution and to rule the island by martial-law. That action led to international sympathy for the Cretan Christians and to a loss of any remaining acquiescence among them for continued Ottoman rule.

When a small insurgency began in September 1895, it spread quickly, and by the summer of 1896 the Ottoman forces had lost military control of most of the island.

The new uprising led to the dispatch of a Greek expeditionary force to the island, culminating in the Greco-Turkish War of 1897 in which Greece suffered a heavy defeat. The Great Powers dispatched a multinational naval force, the International Squadron, to Crete in February 1897 and forced the Greek Army to abandon the island. It also bombarded Cretan insurgent forces, placed sailors and marines ashore and instituted a blockade of Crete and key ports in Greece, which ended organised combat on the island by late March 1897. Meanwhile, the International Squadron's senior admirals formed an "Admirals Council", which temporarily governed Crete pending a resolution of the Cretan uprising and eventually decided that Crete should become an autonomous state within the Ottoman Empire.

The International Squadron forced the Ottoman troops to depart Crete in November 1898. Rural Turks and bashi-bazuks (irregular Turkish troops), goaded by the appointment of Stylianos M. Alexiou as the first Christian director of the Revenue Service, on 6 September 1898 (25 August 1898 according to the Julian calendar then in use on Crete, which was 12 days behind the modern Gregorian calendar during the 19th century), as the new clerks were on their way to start work in the town customs house, attacked them and the British detachment escorting them. A Turkish mob rapidly spread throughout the town, as Cretan Greek houses and shops were pillaged and buildings were torched, particularly in the area then known as Vezir Çarşı, the modern-day 25 August Street. Around 700 Cretan Greeks, 17 British soldiers, and the British Consul in Crete were killed. The Great Powers ordered the rapid trial and execution of the Muslim Cretan ringleaders of the riots. In the wake of the Candia massacre, the Great Powers decided that all Ottoman influence on Crete had to cease. On 6 November 1898, under the orders of the Powers, the last Ottoman troops withdrew from the island, marking the end of 253 years of Ottoman rule. The Cretan State, autonomous but under the suzerainty of the Sultan and under international occupation, was established upon the arrival of its first High Commissioner, Prince George of Greece and Denmark, on 21 December 1898 (9 December according to the Julian calendar).

== Demographics ==
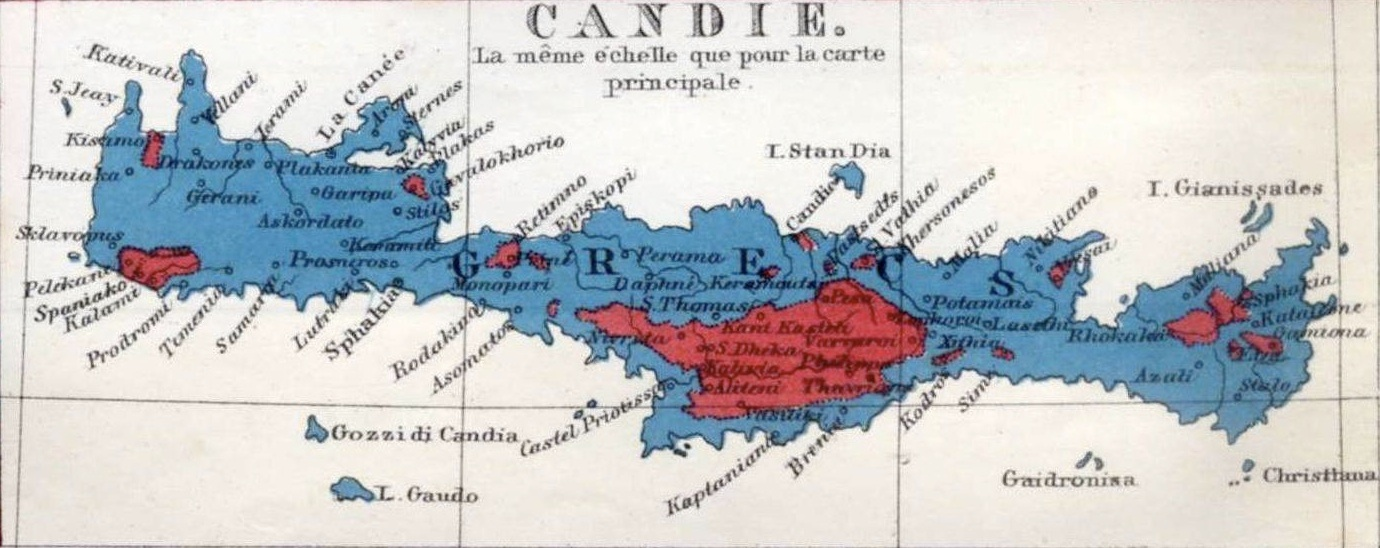
Map of Crete, around 1861. Greek Orthodox Cretan Muslim/Turkish The Muslim population of the island (Cretan Turks) left with the population exchange between Greece and Turkey.

Ottomans never transferred colonists to Crete. The Muslim Turkokritiki were of Cretan origin, mostly speaking exclusively the Cretan dialect. After the Ottoman conquest of 1669, a sizeable proportion of the population gradually converted to Islam. There were also Black Muslim Cretans of sub-Saharan African descent and named Halikoutes and Turkogifti (Turkish Gypsies). Contemporary estimates vary, but on the eve of the Greek War of Independence, up to 45% of the population of the island may have been Muslim. By the last Ottoman census in 1881, Christians were 76% of the population, and Muslims (usually called "Turks" regardless of language, culture or ancestry) 24% of the population, but Muslims were over 60% in the three large towns on the north coast and Monofatsi. Christians were 93% of the population in 1923 of the districts of Crete. The remaining Muslims were forced to leave for Turkey in the population exchange by religion between Greece and Turkey.

== Administrative divisions ==
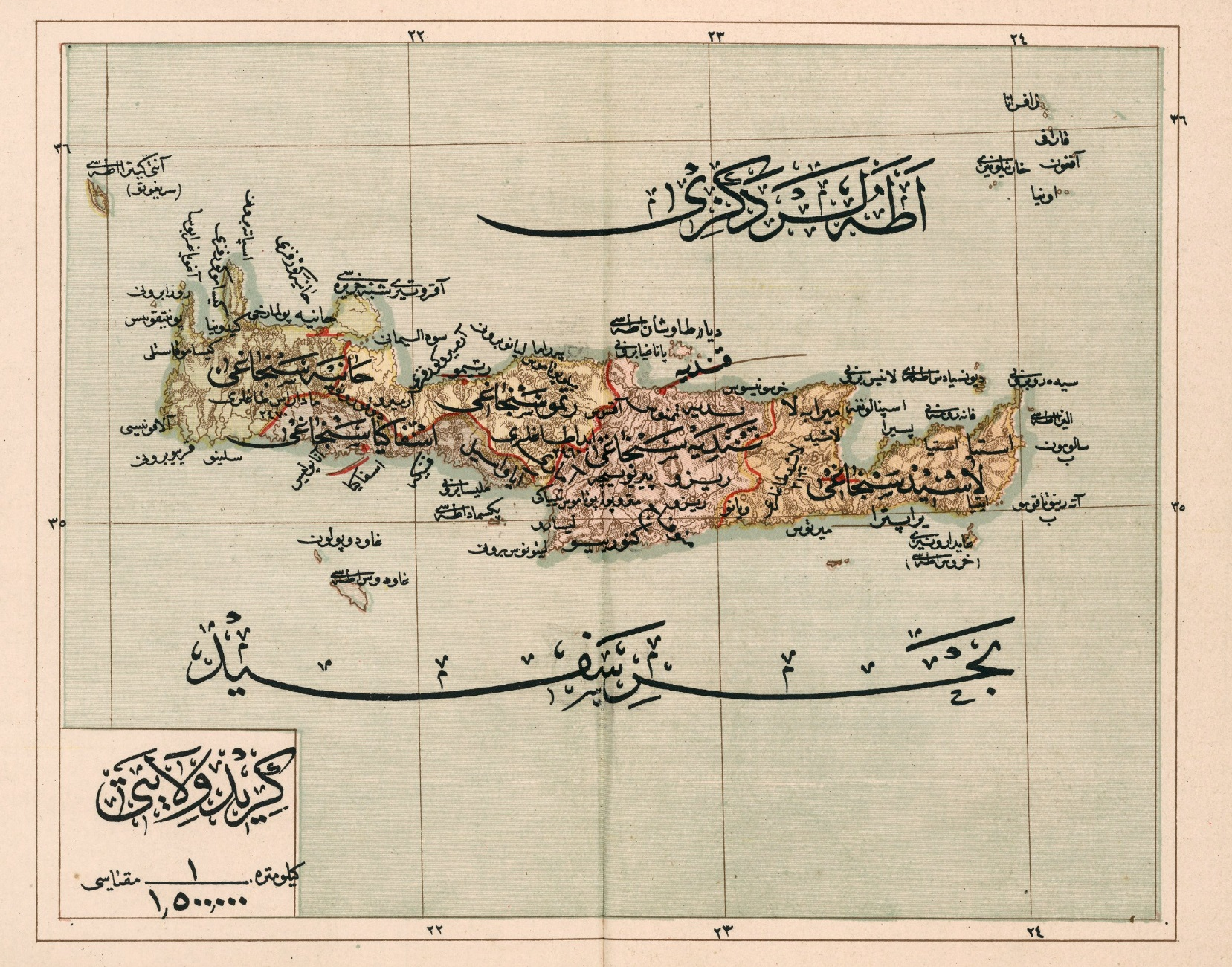
Map of subdivisions of Crete Vilayet in 1907

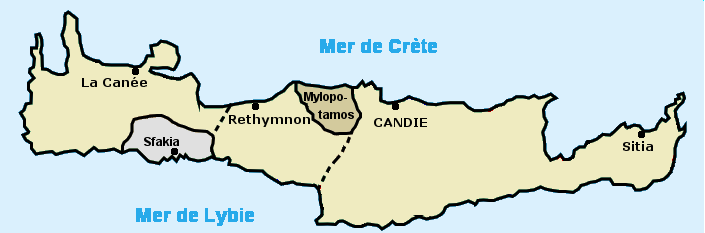
The administrative division of Crete until 1827

Sanjaks of Ottoman Crete in the 17th century:

1. Sanjak of Hanya
2. Sanjak of Resmo
3. Sanjak of Selene

Sanjaks in 1700-1718

1. Sanjak of Kandiye (Seat of the Pasha)
2. Sanjak of Resmo
3. Sanjak of Hanya

Sanjaks, circa 1876:

1. Sanjak of Hanya
2. Sanjak of Resmo
3. Sanjak of Kandiye
4. Sanjak of İsfakya
5. Sanjak of Laşit
