= Dervish Pasha =

Dervish Pasha could refer to the following Ottoman statesmen:

- Darwish Pasha (governor of Damascus), governor of Damascus in 1571–1574
- Dervis Pasha (governor of Diyarbekir) (-1578)
- Dervish Pasha Bajezidagić, twice governor of Bosnia and author of Persian poetry
- Dervish Mehmed Pasha the Bosnian, grand vizier under Ahmed I (1606)
- Koca Dervish Mehmed Pasha, grand vizier under Mehmed IV (1653–54)
- Darwish Pasha al-Kurji, governor of Sidon, Karaman and Damascus (1770–1784)
- Moralı Dervish Mehmed Pasha, who held office under Abdülhamid I (1775–77) on List of Ottoman grand viziers
- Burdurlu Dervish Mehmed Pasha, who held office under Mahmud II (1818–20), see List of Ottoman grand viziers
