= Abd al-Ghani al-Nabulsi =

Syrian Islamic scholar (1641–1731)

- Born: عبدالغنی بن اسماعیل النابلسی Abd al-Ghani al-Nabulsi; 19 March 1641; Damascus, Ottoman Empire, now Syria
- Died: 5 March 1731 (aged 89); Damascus, Ottoman Empire, now Syria
- Known for: Muslim scholar, Sufi

Shaykh 'Abd al-Ghani ibn Isma′il al-Nabulsi (an-Nabalusi) (19 March 1641 – 5 March 1731), was an eminent Sunni Muslim scholar, poet, and author on works about Sufism, ethnography and agriculture.

== Family origins ==
Abd al-Ghani's family descended from the Banu Jama'a, which traditionally provided qadis (chief judges) for the Shafi'i fiqh (school of Islamic law) of Sunni Islam for the Mamluk rulers of Syria and Egypt. The Banu Jama'a hailed from Hama before settling in Jerusalem in the 13th century. One of its principal branches remained in Jerusalem, providing the preachers for the al-Aqsa Mosque, while another principal branch relocated to Cairo, the Mamluk capital, under Badr al-Din Muhammad Ibn Jama'a in 1291 after being appointed by Sultan al-Ashraf Khalil as qadi al-qudat (head judge of the sultanate) and shaykh al-shuyukh (head of the Sufi brotherhoods). Badr al-Din died in 1333 and his direct descendants died out in the 15th century. Abd al-Ghani's family descended from Badr al-Din's younger brother Abd al-Rahman, who had remained in Jerusalem. Shortly after the conquest of Mamluk Syria by the Ottoman Empire in 1516, part of Abd al-Rahman's family moved briefly to Nablus then permanently to Damascus, which attracted numerous people from Palestine in the 16th century. The family became known as "al-Nabulsi" (A Nisba, "Of Nablus" ) after their short stay in Nablus.

The great-grandfather of Abd al-Ghani, Ismai'il al-Nabulsi, was a Shafi'i jurist, the Shafi'i mufti of Damascus and a teacher of the fiqh at the Umayyad Mosque and four madrasas in the city. One of the madrasas, the Darwishiyya Madrasa, was built by the governor Darwish Pasha and endowed specifically for Isma'il and his descendants to teach the Shafi'i fiqh. Isma'il taught there Turkish, Persian and Arabic students, and was fluent in each of the languages. He grew wealthy, owning several villages and farms and gaining connections to the imperial government in Constantinople. He was the founder of the Nabulsi family's wealth and a mausoleum was built for him by Darwish Pasha in the Bab al-Saghir cemetery. Abd al-Ghani's grandfather and namesake inherited wealth from his mother Hanifa bint al-Shihabi Ahmad and owned shops and residences in the Salihiyya neighborhood. He was not known for his scholarship and is remembered by Abd al-Ghani as a generous man.

== Life ==
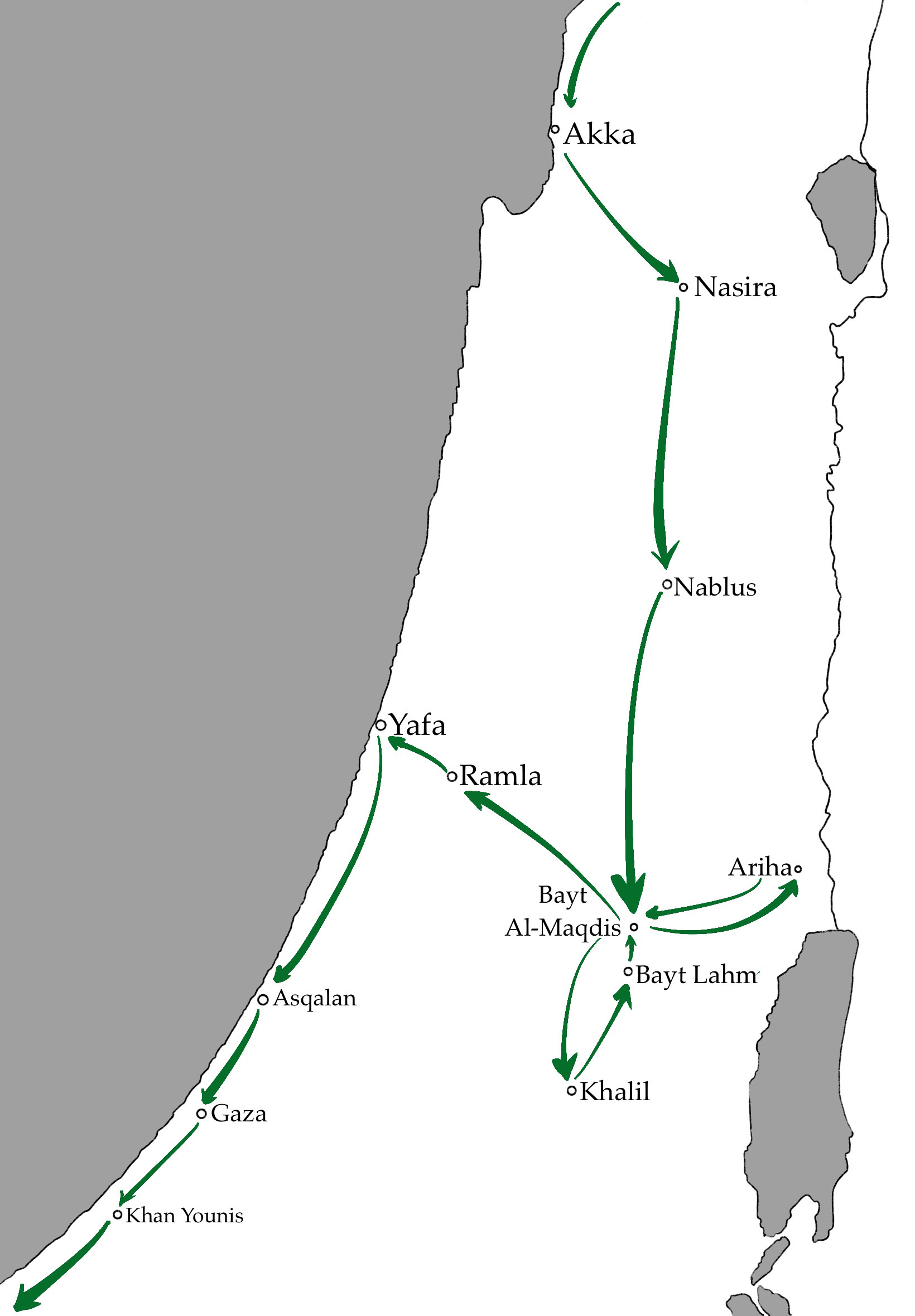
A map detailing the route taken by Abd al-Ghani al-Nabulsi on his travels through Palestine in 1698

Abd al-Ghani was born in Damascus in 1641. His father, Isma'il, was a jurist, and had switched to the Hanafi school of jurisprudence after a debate with a Hanafi student. This school of thought was preferred by Ottoman rulers of Syria. Isma'il was a contributor to Arabic literature, wrote on legal matters, taught at the Umayyad Mosque and Damascene madrasas (Islamic schools) and occupied the post of qadi in Sidon for a certain period. He supervised Abd al-Ghani's early education but died in 1653 when Abd al-Ghani was 12 years old.

Even before the age of 20, Abd al-Ghani al-Nabulusi had started teaching and giving formal legal opinions (fatwa). He joined both the mystical orders Qadiriyya and Naqshbandi and spent seven years in isolation in his house studying the mystics on their expression of divine experiences. He taught in the Umawi Mosque in Damascus and the Salihiyya Madrasa, becoming renowned throughout the region as an accomplished Islamic scholar. He travelled extensively, seeing Istanbul (1664), Lebanon (1688), Jerusalem (1689), Palestine (1689), Egypt (1693), Arabia (1693), and Tripoli (1700). He met with Shaykh Abd al-Razzaq al-Kilani, a descendent of Abd al-Qadir al-Jilani, on his way to Edirne and Istanbul. Some of his travels were documented in memoirs he wrote, such as the four journeys he made between the years 1688 CE and 1700 CE, with one memoir being produced for each. He produced hundreds of scholarly works and was identified by contemporaries and later scholars as a significant local authority.

He was married twice, first to a woman named Musliha, who he had a son named Ismail with, then to a woman named Alma, who he had two daughters named Zaynab and Tahira with.

He died and was buried in Damascus in 1731 at 90 years of age. His was a large and public funeral, attended by the Ottoman governor and chief judge, and he was later entombed in the Salimiyya Mosque near the mausoleum of ibn Arabi.

== His works ==
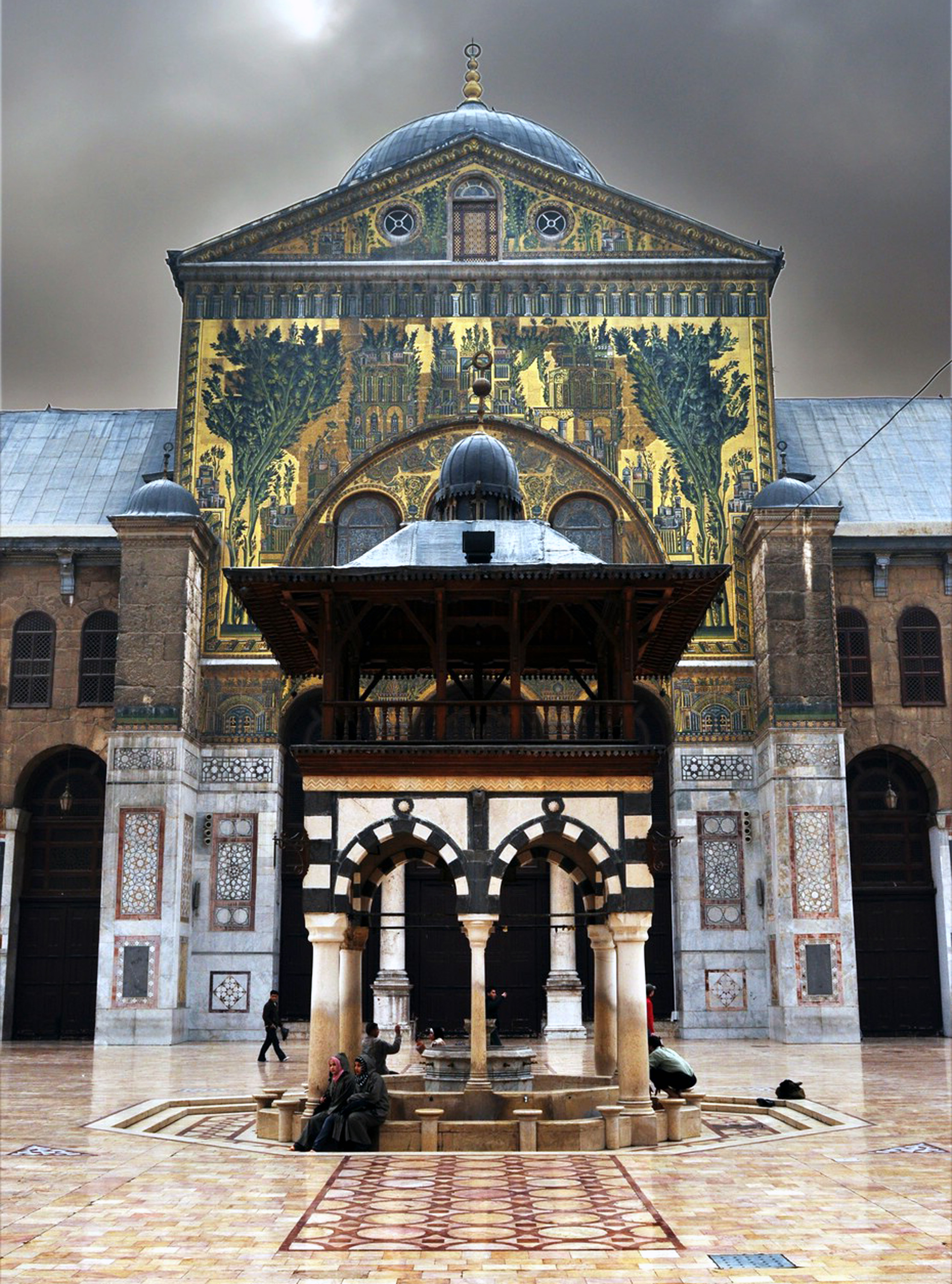
Umayyad Mosque, Damascus, where Nabulsi taught regularly from 1661

He left over 200 written works. Among al-Nablusi's contemporaries, his studies of 13th-century Sufi writer Ibn Arabi were his most famous works.

His views on religious tolerance towards other religions were developed under the inspiration of the works of Ibn Arabi. He made two visits to Palestine, in 1690, and 1693–4, visiting Christian and Jewish sites, as well as sacred Muslim shrines Maqam (shrine), and he enjoyed there the hospitality of local Christian monks.

Subjects he wrote about include Sufism, Rihla, agriculture, and poetry. He also wrote ethnographic works based on his travels to Tripoli, Egypt, Jerusalem, Lebanon and other areas of the Middle East.

=== Select works ===
- Idâh al-Maqsud min wahdat al-wujud ("Clarifying What is Meant by the Unity of Being")
- Sharh Diwan Ibn Farid (Commentary on Ibn al-Farid's Poetry)
- Jam'u al-Asrâr fi man'a al-Ashrâr 'an at-Ta'n fi as-Sufiyah al-Akhyar (Collection of the secrets to prevent the evils castigate the pious Sufis)
- Shifa' al-Sadr fî Fada'il Laylat al-Nisf Min Sha'bân wa Layllat al-Qadr (Curing the heart on the Virtues of the night of Nisfu Sha'ban and The Night of Qadr)
- Nafahat al-Azhar 'Ala Nasamat al-Ashar, a badī‘iyya in praise of the Prophet, 'no doubt' inspired by 'A'isha al-Ba'uniyya's al-Fatḥ al-mubīn fī madḥ al-amīn (Clear Inspiration, on Praise of the Trusted One); both writers accompanied their respective badī‘iyyas with a commentary.
- al-Sulh bayn al-ikhwan fi hukm ibahat al-dukhan, an influential legal treatise advocating the lawfulness of smoking tobacco; ed. Ahmad Muhammad Dahman (Damascus, 1924).
- Ta‘tir al-anam fi tafsir al-ahlam, ed. Taha 'Abd al-Ra’uf Sa‘d, 2 vols. (Damascus, n.d.)
- al-Haqiqa wa al-majaz fi al-rihla ila bilad al-sham wa misr wa al-hijaz, edited by Ahmad 'Abd al-Majid al-Haridi (Cairo, 1986) is the longest rihla. This rihla also goes by the title al-Rihla al-kubra and covers over 500 folios in minuscule. The journey began on Muharram 1005/ September 1693 and ended with the Hajj 388 days later.
- al-Hadra al-Unsiyya fî al-Rihla al-Qudsiyya, also called al-Rihla al-wustd focuses on al-Nablusi's trip to Palestine, specifically Jerusalem and Hebron.
- Nihayat al-murad fi sharh hadiyyat Ibn al-'Imad, a treatise on the rites of prayer; ed. ‘'Abd al-Razzaq al-Halabi (Limmasol, 1994).
- al-Hadiqa al-nadiyya: Sharh al-tariqa al-muhammadiyya, 2 vols. (Lailbur, 1977).
- Hillat al-dhahab al-ibriz fi rihlat Ba'albak wa-al-Biqa' al-'aziz, often known as al-Rihla al-Sughrd, was the first of al-Nabulsi's rihla. It describes a 15-day journey to Lebanon in AH 1100/ AD 1688.
- al-Tuhfa al-Nabulusiyya ft 1-rihla al-Tarabulusiyya was his second rihla, describing a 40-day trip across Lebanon to Tripoli.
- Kitab 'ilm al-malahah fi 'ilm al-falahah ("The science of elegance within the science of agriculture")
- Book of Dreams Kitab al Manam (described as "arguably the most important text in the rich history of Islamic dream interpretation," translated into English in 2022 by Yasmine Seale)

== Bibliography ==
- Sirriyeh, Elizabeth (2005). Sufi Visionary of Ottoman Damascus: 'Abd al-Ghani al-Nabulusi, 1641–1731. Abingdon, Oxon: RoutledgeCurzon. ISBN 0-415-34165-5.
- VIAGGIO A GERUSALEMME - Edizione in Italiano a Cura di Giuditta Andrei (2026). ISBN 979-8-186-62086-0
