= Dervish Mehmed Pasha =

Dervish Mehmed Pasha may refer to:

- Boşnak Dervish Mehmed Pasha, who held office under Ahmed I (1606)
- Koca Dervish Mehmed Pasha, who held office under Mehmed IV (1653–54)
- Moralı Dervish Mehmed Pasha, who held office under Abdülhamid I (1775–77) on List of Ottoman grand viziers
- Burdurlu Dervish Mehmed Pasha, who held office under Mahmud II (1818–20), see List of Ottoman grand viziers

== See also ==
- Mehmed Pasha (disambiguation)
- Derviş
- Dervish (disambiguation)
