= Darwiche–Razzak–Fahda family conflict =

2001–2009 events in Sydney, New South Wales, Australia

Naseam El-Zeyat
- Conviction: Murder (3 counts)
- Penalty: Life imprisonment without parole

Ramzi Aouad
- Conviction: Murder (3 counts)
- Penalty: Life imprisonment without parole

Adnan Darwiche
- Convictions: Murder (2 counts); Attempted murder; Discharging a loaded firearm with intent
- Penalty: Life imprisonment + 20 years without parole

Abass Osman
- Conviction: Murder (2 counts)
- Penalty: 27 years' imprisonment (22 years without parole)

Mohamed Razzak
- Conviction: Shooting with intent
- Penalty: 13 years' imprisonment (9 years without parole)

Bilal Razzak
- Conviction: Contempt of court
- Penalty: 15 months' imprisonment

Darwiche–Razzak–Fahda family conflict
Date	2001-2009
Location	Sydney

Belligerents
Darwiche family	Razzak family, Fahda family

The Darwiche–Razzak–Fahda family conflict was a series of murders and assaults among three Australian families of Lebanese descent in south-west Sydney, New South Wales between February 2001 and March 2009. Some family members were part of rival cannabis operations. Marital breakdowns were also reportedly a factor in the crimes.

== Background ==
In late 2000 and early 2001, second-generation members of the Darwiche and Razzak families were part of rival illegal cannabis operations.

== Families ==
- Darwiche family: Farouk "Frank" Darwiche
  - Children: Albert, Michael, Abdul, Adnan, Ali and Khadjie
    - Associates: Khaled "Crazy" Taleb, Naseam "Erdt" El-Zeyat, Ramzi "Fidel" Aouad, Abass Osman, Mohamed Douar, Rami Homsi, Bassim Said, Michael Darwick, Ahmed "Gary" Awad, Mohammed Touma, "Mr. W" and "Mr. X"
- Razzak family: Jamal Razzak (brother of Ali Abdul)
  - Children: Bilal and Mohamed
- Ali Abdul Razzak (brother of Jamal, cousin of Farouk)
- Farouk "Frank" Razzak (cousin of Ali Abdul)
  - Children: Samear, Mohamad and Jomana
- Ahmed Razzak
  - Child: Rabia Abdul-Razzak ("Balaboof")
- Ziad "Ziggy" and Gehad Razzak (brothers, cousins of Bilal and Mohamed)
- Fahda family: Hussein, Ahmed and Mohammed Fahda (brothers); sister, Donna

Khadjie Darwiche was married to Ali Abdul Razzak, and Ramzi Aouad was married to Donna Fahda. Both marriages broke down, and those breakdowns were said to have been contributing factors to the events which followed.

== Timeline ==
=== Adnan Darwiche vs Bilal Razzak: February 2001 ===
A February 2001 confrontation between Adnan Darwiche and Bilal Razzak at Nemra's Cafe in Bankstown, New South Wales, reportedly sparked the conflict. On 25 February, shots were fired into Darwiche's car at the family residence in Punchbowl. That night, Taleb and Adnan and Abdul Darwiche drove to the Razzak residence in Bankstown and fired shots at the building. On 28 February, family members met in a bid for peace. Adnan Darwiche threatened Razzak, who fled to Lebanon on 7 March. He returned to Australia on 2 May.

=== Shooting of Bilal Razzak: 17 June 2001 ===
Adnan Darwiche and another man (suspected to be Abdul Darwiche, although he was never convicted) entered Razzak's unit in Bankstown. Both men wore full-face balaclavas and dark clothing, and had Glock-style pistols. Bilal Razzak was listening to music with Samear Razzak in his bedroom. Adnan Darwiche fired five shots at Razzak; three struck him. Paralysed after the shooting, he later recovered the use of his legs.

Gehad Razzak was released from prison and met with Adnan Darwiche, who agreed to pay Bilal Razzak compensation for shooting him. Ten to fifteen thousand dollars was paid to Gehad for Bilal.

=== Peace: 2001-2003 ===
Darwiche patriarch Farouk Darwiche died in 2001. His death greatly affected Adnan Darwiche, who abandoned his drug business and became deeply religious (making the Hajj in 2002 and 2003). There was peace among the families.

=== Shooting of Khaled Taleb: 30 July 2003 ===
The feud was reignited more than two years after the shooting of Bilal Razzak. Taleb, Adnan Darwiche's right-hand man in his former drug business, was shot in both legs by two masked men as he spoke to a friend in the Bankstown halal butcher shop. Taleb believed that the gunmen were Gehad and Ziad Razzak, although they were not charged.

=== Yanderra Street shooting: 27 August 2003 ===
Adnan Darwiche believed that the Razzaks were responsible. According to Taleb, Adnan and Abdul Darwiche, Touma and Aouad visited him on 25 August and told him that they had learned that Gehad and Ziad Razzak were living on Yanderra Street in Condell Park.

During the evening of 27 August, Adnan Darwiche and another man (suspected to be Abdul Darwiche, although he was acquitted) took up positions near the Yanderra Street house. Both were armed with SKS semi-automatic rifles. A third man (suspected to be Aouad, although he was not charged) drove to the house and fired 11 shots at a car parked outside it. Farouk Razzak came out of the house to investigate; the gunmen fired 55 rounds, but he was not hit. Neither were the other occupants of the house: his wife Nahla, son Mohamad and daughter Jomana. The gunmen fired wildly, and shots hit 96 Yanderra Street (five houses away). Farouk yelled to Nahla, "Listen, [those] pigs Abdul and Eddie, they shot me".

=== Murder of Ali Abdul Razzak: 29 August 2003 ===
According to Jamal Razzak, he was assaulted by Adnan and Abdul Darwiche and another man in Greenacre at 11:30 am. Although Razzak alleged that Abdul Darwiche pointed an assault-style rifle at him through the passenger window of a vehicle, no charges were filed.

Ali Abdul Razzak was shot and killed at 1:23 pm as he sat in his car, which was parked near the Lakemba Mosque. Witnesses saw a small, black hatchback vehicle which stopped in front of Razzak's car; its driver and a passenger were wearing balaclavas. The passenger, holding a black pistol, got out of the car; he fired at Razzak and got back into the vehicle, which drove off. Fourteen spent cartridge cases were found at the scene.

According to Taleb, he was visited at his sister's house at about 2:00 pm by Adnan Darwiche, Gary Awad and Touma; Darwiche gave Taleb a .40-calibre Glock pistol to dispose of. Darwiche was acquitted of Razzak's murder, and no one else has been charged. The following day, 55 shots were fired at Aouad's family home in Liverpool and 65 at Taleb's Liverpool house.

=== Stolen weapons: September–October 2003 ===
Thirty-one Glock pistols were stolen from Obliging Security in Chester Hill. One was found at the scene of a shootout involving El-Zeyat and Aouad. Ziad and Gehad Razzak went into hiding and stayed with a friend, Ali Hamka, who lived in Greenacre; Hamka's partner, Mervat Nemra, and their two young children left to stay with relatives.

On 30 September 2003, Adnan Darwiche allegedly purchased a rocket launcher from Taha Abdul Rahman for $15,000. Darwiche allegedly purchased six more rocket launchers from Rahman on 9 October, selling five to Mohammad Ali Elomar. Elomar, allegedly involved in a plot to blow up Parliament House or the Lucas Heights reactor, reportedly said: "Look what is happening overseas. It is a war against Muslims. We should do something about it over here". It was thought that the rocket launchers may have been stolen from the Australian Defence Force.

Around 6 October 2003, Taleb witnessed a shootout between Darwiche and Razzak family members outside Aouad's home in Liverpool. About three days later, Adnan Darwiche told Taleb that he had learned where Gehad and Ziad Razzak were staying. According to Taleb, he accompanied Darwiche on a drive past the house. A man (later given the pseudonym "Mr. W") testified that Osman drove him past the house, saying: "Just drive past, I don't want the Razzaks to recognize the car or me. That's not the way they are going to do it. I am going to be in the hotty waiting for them on Roberts Road. Eddie, Fidel and Erdt are going to run down, they are soldiers."

=== Lawford Street murders: 14 October 2003 ===
Nemra decided to stay at Hamka's house on the evening of 13 October 2003. Plans were made for an assault on the house in the early hours of 14 October. According to Mr. W, he was present at Osman's house when he overheard a conversation between Osman and Adnan Darwiche, who told Osman that he would be the driver.

Taleb said that a Nissan Pulsar was stolen and driven to El-Zeyat's house. Adnan Darwiche, Taleb, El-Zeyat, Aouad, Osman Darwiche and Awad were present for a discussion of whether to use the rocket launcher in the assault, and it was decided not to do so. Adnan outlined each man's role: Taleb was to have been the driver but, due to his injuries, he would be a liability if there was trouble. Osman was assigned the role of driver. Adnan and Touma would use the SKS rifles, and Aouad a MAC-10. El-Zeyat, who also wanted to be a shooter, was added to the plans and given a Glock. Adnan told the shooters to fire on the house in an "S" shape, in case its occupants dropped to the floor.

At 3:00 am, Osman dropped the other men off near Lawford Street. They fired 100 rounds, of which 55 hit the house. Ziad Razzak, who was lying on a couch in the lounge room, was hit several times and died in hospital. Nemra, asleep in the front bedroom, was hit in the neck and died within minutes. According to Taleb (who had stayed at El-Zeyat's house with Awad), the group returned.

=== Murder of Ahmed Fahda: 30 October 2003 ===
The marriage of Aouad and Donna Fahda had broken down in August 2003. According to Taleb, Aouad told him that he feared the Fahda brothers would kill him because the marriage was over.

On 30 October 2003, Fahda and Bassam Said were in a 4-wheel drive which ran out of petrol; they pushed it into a service station in Punchbowl. At about 2:00 pm, two men armed with pistols fired 29 rounds at Fahda and fatally injured him. El-Zeyat and Aouad were convicted of the murder, but they appealed their conviction and a new trial was ordered. Both men are currently facing life sentences.

=== Kings Head Tavern shooting: 7 December 2003 ===
Fifty to 70 shots were fired in the car park of the Kings Head Tavern in Hurstville at 3:15 pm, narrowly missing bystanders. Two unidentified gunmen opened fire on El-Zeyat, Aouad and a friend as they left the tavern; the friend was grazed on the leg by a bullet. El-Zeyat and Aouad returned fire; their assailants escaped, and El-Zeyat and Aouad were arrested at the scene. A 9mm Glock found in a skip near the tavern was one of the weapons which had been stolen from Obliging Security about three months earlier.

=== Mons Street shooting: 8 May 2004 ===
At about 5:19 pm, Michael Darwiche, Mohamed Douar, Rami Homsi and Bassim Said were standing at the front of Darwiche's house on Mons Street in Condell Park when they were shot at by three men in a passing vehicle: Mohamed Razzak and (allegedly) Samear Razzak and Rabia Abdul-Razzak. Michael Darwiche was hit by a bullet, but was not seriously injured.

== Arrests, trials and sentencing ==
On 5 November 2003, three men were arrested at Sydney's Star City Casino and questioned about Fahda's murder. Adnan Darwiche was arrested on 28 November.

Adnan and Abdul Darwiche were denied bail on 11 February 2004. Hussein Fahda was arrested on firearms charges, and was also denied bail. On 26 May, El-Zeyat and Aouad were charged with Fahda's murder and denied bail. Bassam Said was charged on 2 June with being an accessory to Fahda's murder. On 21 November, Mr. W became an informer and gave a statement to police. Douar gave police a statement on 2 December about the Mons Street shooting.

On 28 April 2005, El-Zeyat and Aouad were charged with the Lawford Street murders. On 5 August 2005 Adnan and Abdul Darwiche, El-Zeyat, Aouad and Osman were arraigned on charges related to the Yanderra Street shooting, the Lawford Street murders and Fahda's murder on 5 August. Adnan Darwiche's charges included solicitation to murder Fahda and being an accessory after the fact. Abdul Darwiche was charged in relation to the Yanderra Street shooting. On 6 December, Adnan and Abdul Darwiche were charged with the shooting of Bilal Razzak. Three days later, Supreme Court Justice Virginia Bell ordered Abdul Darwiche to be tried separately.

Taleb became an informer on 6 February 2006, and gave a lengthy statement to police in Beirut. His evidence was central to securing convictions. On 13 February, Abdul Darwiche's trial began. The Director of Public Prosecutions decided to pursue Adnan Darwiche on an ex-officio indictment three days later, including a charge of murdering Ali Abdul Razzak. On 8 March, Justice Bell acquitted Abdul Darwiche of the Yanderra Street shooting. Mr. X received text messages threatening his family between 13 and 16 March, before he presented evidence at a hearing. That month, Taleb returned to Australia. On 3 April, Justice Bell began hearing two trials in the Supreme Court of New South Wales: the shooting of Bilal Razzak, the Yanderra Street shooting, the murder of Ali Abdul Razzak and the Lawford Street murders; and the murder of Fahda. The trial in relation to the Mons Street shooting began the following month in the District Court of New South Wales, with Mohamed, Samear and Rabia Abdul Razzak charged. On 16 May, a Supreme Court jury acquitted Adnan Darwiche of charges related to Fahda's murder and convicted El-Zeyat and Aouad. District Court Judge Knox SC dismissed the jury in the Mons Street trial on 20 June because of a Sydney Morning Herald article that day. Two days later, Justice Bell dismissed an application by Osman to be tried separately from the other defendants. Bilal Razzak refused to give evidence at trial on 14 July, and was charged with contempt of court. On 9 August, a Supreme Court jury convicted Adnan Darwiche in relation to the shooting of Bilal Razzak, the Yanderra Street shooting and the Lawford Street murders; he was acquitted of the murder of Ali Abdul Razzak. El-Zeyat, Aouad and Osman were convicted of the Lawford Street murders.

On 10 November, Justice Bell sentenced Adnan Darwiche, El-Zeyat, Aouad and Osman. Adnan Darwiche was sentenced to two terms of life imprisonment and 20 years' imprisonment. El-Zeyat and Aouad were each sentenced to three terms of life imprisonment. Osman was sentenced to 27 years' imprisonment, and would be eligible for parole in 22 years. The four men laughed, joked and talked loudly as they were sentenced. When they were led from the dock, they shouted: "God is great". El-Zeyat verbally attacked Justice Bell. At a police press conference outside court, Abdul Darwiche said: "My brother didn't kill anyone. The person that killed the people, he's out there fishing ... This is a political witch hunt."

On 29 November, Bilal Razzak pleaded guilty to the contempt-of-court charge. Supreme Court Justice Johnson sentenced him on 7 December to 15 months' imprisonment, from 20 August 2007 to 19 November 2008; Razzak was already serving time for a 2001 stabbing incident.

On 5 February 2007, the second Mons Street trial began in District Court. The jury acquitted Samear and Rabia Abdul Razzak of all charges on 23 March, convicting Mohamed Razzak. He was sentenced to 13 years' imprisonment, and eligible for parole after nine years. On 16 December 2008, Razzak appealed his conviction and sentence in the Court of Criminal Appeal. Although the court overturned his convictions for shooting at Douar, Said and Homsi (since it could not be established that he was shooting at anyone other than Michael Darwiche), his sentence remained unchanged.

El-Zeyat and Aouad successfully appealed their conviction for the murder of Ahmed Fahda on 8 April 2011, and a new trial was ordered. The charges were dropped by the Director of Public Prosecutions on 30 May 2012.

== Murder of Abdul Darwiche: 14 March 2009 ==
On 14 March 2009, nearly five years after the last family violence, Abdul Darwiche was executed in front of his family after leaving a restaurant in Bass Hill. A man approached him, and Darwiche reportedly asked: "What are you going to do? Kill me in front of my fucking family?" He was shot several times behind the wheel of his four-wheel drive. Michael Darwiche and Michael Darwick were arrested by officers from Strike Force Lieutenant at 9:00 pm on 19 March in Bankstown. A search of their car allegedly found a street directory and printouts from the internet White Pages directory listing names and addresses of members of the Fahda family. Police later suspected that the gunman was Mohammed Fahda and the killing was revenge for the murder of his brother, Ahmed. Mohammed Fahda was arrested on 28 September 2009; he was convicted of murdering Abdul Dawrwiche, and was sentenced to 14 years' imprisonment. An appeal of his conviction was dismissed.

== Legacy ==
In July 2020, crime journalist Mahmood Fazal released an essay centred upon the conflict, and particularly, on the circumstances of Ramzi Aouad. The report detailed allegations of police corruption, intimidation and coercion in the judicial process which resulted in Aouad's conviction, alongside allegations of financial co-operation between the NSW Police Force and an alleged crime family.
