= Dervish (disambiguation) =

A dervish is a Sufi Muslim ascetic.

Dervish or darvish may also refer to:

== Polities ==
- Dervish movement (Somali), the polity centered in modern Waqooyi Bari

== Music ==
- Dervish (band), an Irish folk band
- Sufi whirling, a type of dance

== People ==
- Mevlevi Order, known as whirling dervishes
- Dervish Ali Astrakhani (died 1558), Khan of the Astrakhan Khanate
- Dervish Bejah (1862–1957), Australian camel driver
- Dervish Cara, Albanian revolutionary leader
- Dervish Grady, a character in the Demonata series by Darren Shan
- Dervish Hima (1872–1928), Albanian politician
- Kamal Derwish (1973–2002), American citizen killed by the CIA
- Yu Darvish (born 1986), Japanese baseball player

== Video games ==
- An early name in development for The Arbiter in the Halo video game series
- A profession in Guild Wars Nightfall
- A type of cat in the Postal 2, expansion Apocalypse Weekend
- A car in the racing game Death Rally
- A heavy fighter aircraft in PlanetSide 2
- A BattleMech in the BattleTech universe

== Other uses ==
- Dervish (rocket), an American air-launched rocket of the 1950s
- Dervish Convoy, the first of the Allied Arctic convoys of World War II

== See also ==
- Derviş, a Turkish surname meaning Dervish
- Darwish
- Dervish Mehmed Pasha (disambiguation)
- Dervish Pasha (disambiguation)
