= Darwish =

Darwish and Darvish (and in French more prominently Darwich and Darwiche) are alternate transliterations of the Persian word "dervish", used in Arabic: درويش, referring to a Sufi aspirant. There is no v sound in most Modern Arabic dialects and so the originally Persian word is usually pronounced with a w sound in Arabic. The word appears as a surname in the Levant or for people descended from Levantine communities, particularly in Lebanon, Syria, and Palestine. In Iraq, the surname, which in Arabic means "wandering, roaming", has been borne by people of Jewish descent as well.

An etymology for the name is given in the Oxford Dictionary of American Family Names:

Status name for a Sufi holy man, from Persian and Turkish derviş ‘dervish’, a member of a Sufi Muslim religious order, from Pahlavi driyosh meaning ‘Wayfarer’, ‘one who goes from town to town’ in search of Knowledge, he had to earn his food by his means. He could not live like a hermit in solitude, he had to live in public.

— Dictionary of American Family Names, Oxford University Press, ISBN 0-19-508137-4

== Notable people ==
Darvish
Refer to Darvish

=== Darwish ===
- Abdullah Nimar Darwish (1948–2017), Arab-Israeli politician, founder of the Islamic Movement in Israel
- Adel Darwish, British political journalist, author, historian, broadcaster, and political commentator of Egyptian origin
- Ahmad Darwish, Syrian footballer
- Ihab Darwish, Emirati composer
- Ishaq Darwish (1896–1974), Palestinian politician
- Karim Darwish (born 1981), Egyptian squash player
- Khalid Darwish (born 1979), Emirati footballer
- Mahmoud Darwish (1941–2008), Palestinian poet and author
- Najwan Darwish (born 1978), Palestinian poet and author
- Nonie Darwish (born 1949), Egyptian-American Zionist
- Sayed Darwish (1892–1923), Egyptian composer and singer, considered the father of Egyptian popular music
- Tiffany Darwish (born 1971), American singer and former teen icon. Known popularly by her mononym Tiffany

=== Darwich/Darwiche ===
- Ahmad Darwich (born 1977), Lebanese-Danish DJ and music producer and co-founder of Kashcow record label
- Adnan Darwiche, Australian double murderer from Sydney, New South Wales, currently serving 2 sentences of life imprisonment
- Fadde Darwich (born 1966), Syria-born Swedish stand-up comedian
- Karim Darwich (born 1998), Lebanese footballer

== See also ==
- Darwiche-Razzak-Fahda family conflict, series of murders and assaults carried out between three Australian families of Lebanese descent in south-west Sydney, Australia between February 2001 and March 2009. The Darwiche family refers to Farouk "Frank" Darwiche and his children Albert, Michael, Abdul, Adnan, Ali and Khadjie
- Darweesh v. Trump, a court case

== See also ==
- Derviş
