= Darvish =

Darvish (also Darvish or Darvich; in Persian: درويش) is a given name and a surname. It is an alternate transliteration of the Persian word "dervish", referring to a Sufi aspirant.

People named Darvish or Darvich include:

- Darvish Fakhr, Canadian-born Iranian-American painter
- Darvish Khan (1872–1926), Persian classical musician
- Darvish Mohammad Khan (died 1551), Khan of Sheki (1524–1551)
- Amir Darvish, American actor
- Kenji Darvish, a member of the Japanese visual kei "air" rock band Golden Bomber
- Khashyar Darvich, American documentary film producer and director
- Noah Darvich, German footballer
- Saeko Darvish (born 1986), Japanese actress; ex-wife of
- Yu Darvish (born 1986), Japanese pitcher in Major League Baseball

== See also ==
- Darwish
- Dervish (disambiguation)
- Derviş
