= Seytan Murad Pasha =

Ottoman statesman

Murad Pasha
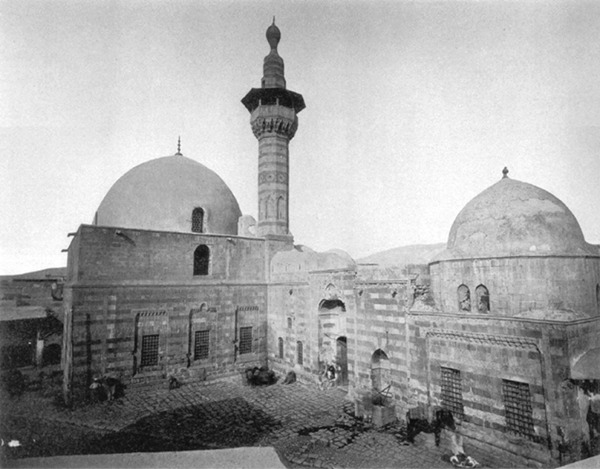
- The Murat Pasha Mosque and Mausoleum which Murat Pasha built and where he was buried, 1890
- Monarch: Selim II

Beylerbey of Damascus
- In office 1568–1570
- Preceded by: Lala Mustafa Pasha
- Succeeded by: Ali Pasha Lankun

Personal details
- Died: 1570 Damascus, Ottoman Empire
- Resting place: Murat Pasha Mosque and Mausoleum, Damascus

Şeytan Murad Pasha (Arabic romanization Murad Pasha al-Shaytan), also known as Kara Murad Pasha, was an Ottoman statesman. After serving stints as beylerbey (provincial governor) of Lahsa, Basra and Shahrizor, he served as governor of Damascus in 1568–1570. He may have been the Murad ibn Abdullah, sanjak-bey (district governor) of Pasin or Kayseri during the reign of Sultan Suleiman the Magnificent (r. 1520–1566), credited by an inscription and the renovated the Haji Bektash Veli Complex.

Murad Pasha was called Kara (Black) by the near contemporary historian İbrahim Peçevi, Şeytan (Devil) by the Ottoman historian Mehmed Sureyya and was known as "the great benefactor" by the 18th-century Damascene chronicler Ibn Jum'a. The contemporary historian Mustafa Âlî met Murad Pasha in Damascus and noted that he was mad and had become the object of ridicule of the Damascenes for keeping dolls representing certain viziers.

During his governorship of Damascus he built a mosque, which was also used a convent for the Naqshbandiyya, a Sufi order. It was situated at the square of Damascus where pilgrims assembled before embarking on the Hajj pilgrimage to Mecca. Murad Pasha died in Damascus in 1570 and was buried in a mausoleum building on the mosque's eastern side. The rooms surrounding the courtyard of the mosque were designated for housing the poor. It is called the Murad Pasha Mosque after him.

== Bibliography ==
- Kafescioğlu, Çiğdem (1999). ""In the Image of Rūm": Ottoman Architectural Patronage in Sixteenth-Century Damascus and Aleppo". In Necipoğlu, Gülru (ed.). Muqarnas: An Annual on the Visual Culture of the Islamic World, Volume 16. Leiden: Brill. pp. 70–96. ISBN 90-04-11482-3.
- Schmidt, Jan (1994). "The Historian as Biographer: Mustafa Ali of Gallipoli's Biographies". CIÉPO Comite international d'etudes pre-ottomanes et ottomanes: VI Symposium Actes. Ankara: Türk Tarih Kurumu Basımevi. pp. 215–223. ISBN 975-16-0548-2.
