= Al-Naqshabandi Mosque =

Mosque in Damascus, Syria

- Arabic: جَامِع النقشبندي
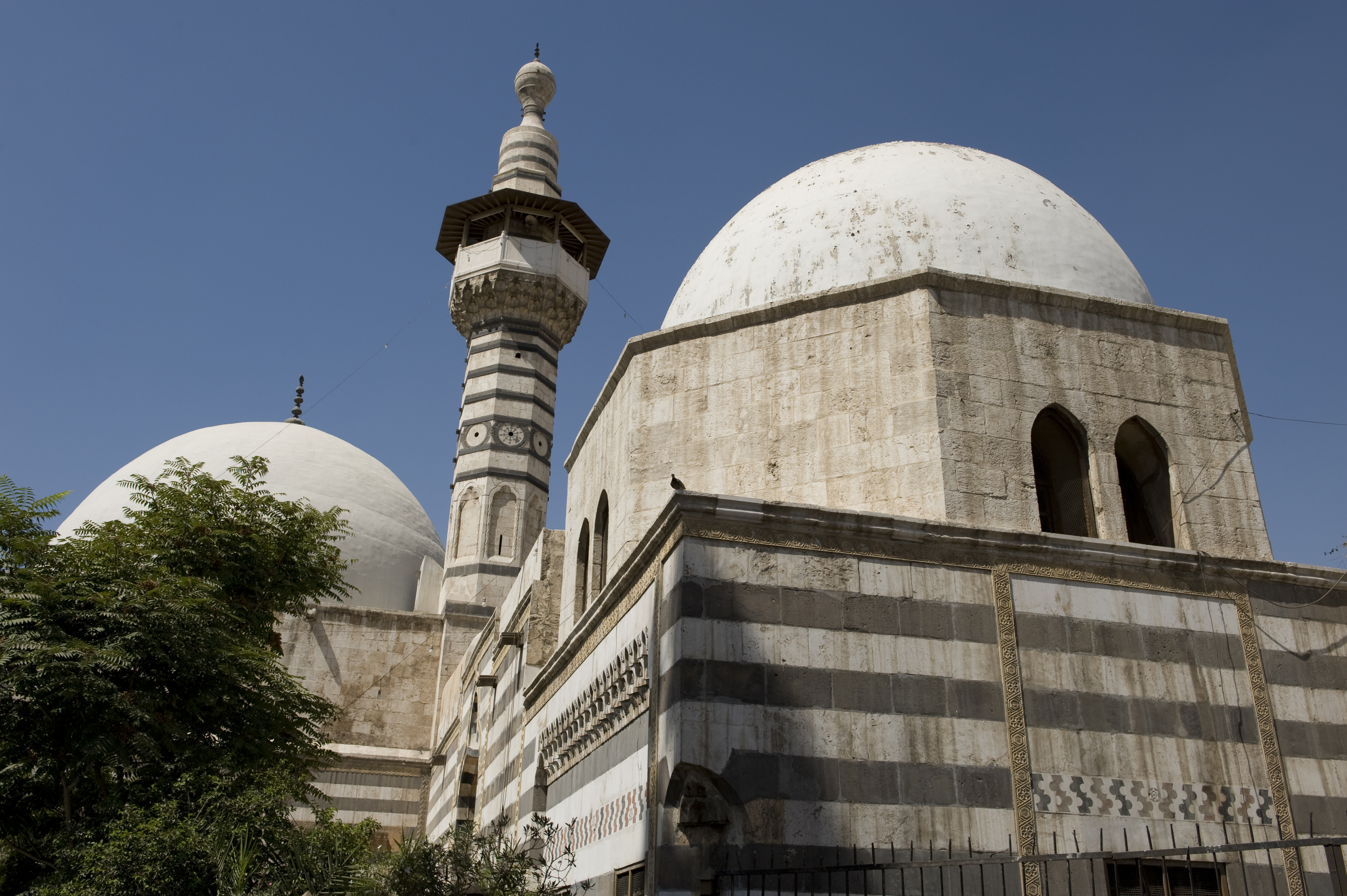
- The mosque in 2021

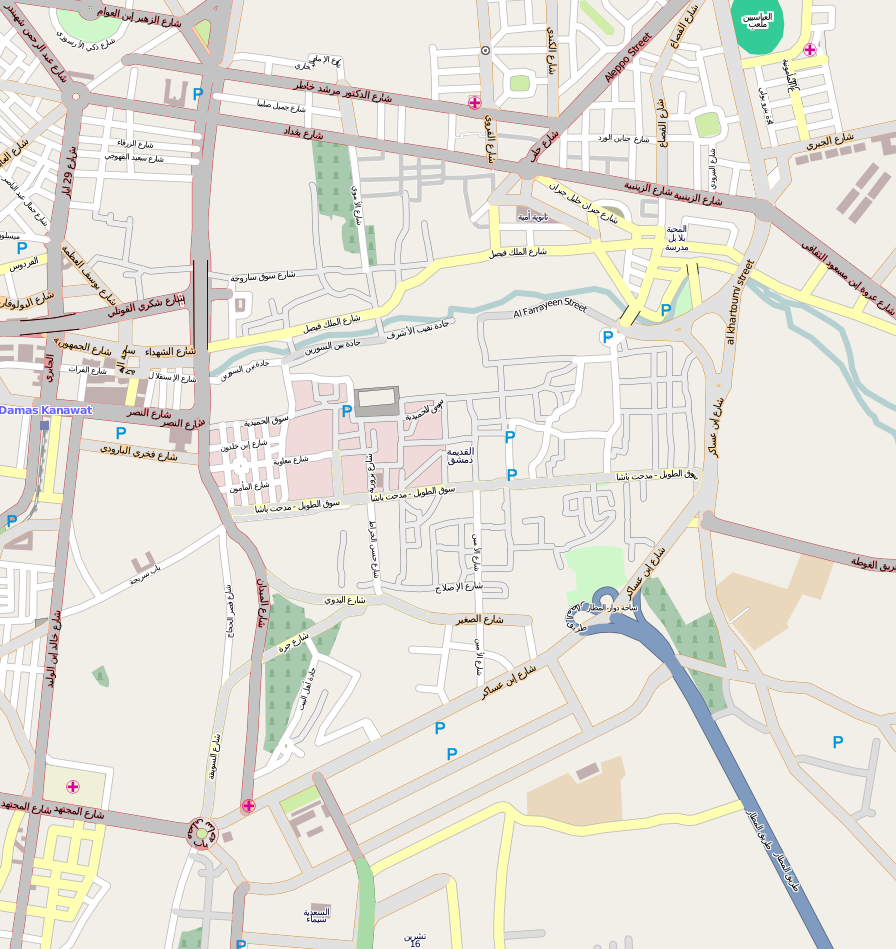
- Location within Old Damascus

Religion
- Affiliation: Sunni Islam
- Ecclesiastical or organisational status: Mosque and mausoleum
- Status: Active

Location
- Location: Al-Midan, Damascus
- Country: Syria
- Interactive map of Al-Naqshabandi Mosque
- Coordinates: 33°30′13″N 36°18′05″E

Architecture
- Type: Islamic architecture
- Style: Ottoman
- Completed: 1568

Specifications
- Dome: 1
- Minaret: 1
- Materials: Stone, marble, tiles

Al-Naqshabandi Mosque (Arabic: جَامِع النَّقْشَبَنْدِي, romanized: Jāmiʿ al-Naqšabandī) after the Naqshbandi Sufi order which it served as a center for. The mosque is also known as Murad Pasha Mosque (Arabic: جَامِع مُرَاد بَاشَا, romanized: Jāmiʿ Murād Bāšā). It is an early Ottoman-era mosque and mausoleum in Damascus, Syria, located in the Suwayqa sector of the Al-Midan quarter. The mosque was erected and named after Murad Pasha, who served as the Ottoman governor ("wali") of Damascus between 1568-1569. The mosque was built in 1568.

== Architecture ==
The mosque is built in the style of central-dome Ottoman mosques, rather than the prevalent Arab-plan hypostyle mosques in Damascus. The building is noted for its similarities with other Ottoman-era mosques in Damascus, including the Sulaymaniyya Takiyya Mosque and the later Darwish Pasha Mosque. The walls of the mosque were built using alternating lines of black and white stones. The mosque is built around a large courtyard ("sahn"), which features an elaborate fountain that was used for ablution ("wudu"). The courtyard is surrounded by an arcade of domed cells ("riwaq"), which were used as sleeping rooms by students and scholars at the mosque. The structure's walls are decorated with elaborate qashani tile panels. The interior rectangular prayer hall is roofed by a typical Ottoman-style lead-covered dome. The prominent hexagonal-shaped minaret is singled out as the only element built in "the image of the minarets of the Arab lands." The mosque also holds in one of its corners the mausoleum where Murad Pasha was buried. The mosque's main gate holds kufic inscriptions that mention the mosque's construction date and its patron's name.

== Road to Mecca ==
During the Mamluk rule, which lasted from 1260 to 1516, Damascus was the main city for the gathering of pilgrims of the region for their five-week journey to Mecca. The city was viewed as a holy one because of the remains in the Umayyad Mosque. Damascus kept this role during the Ottoman rule (1516-1918), and was referred to as the "Gateway to Hajj". Every year approximately 30,000 pilgrims gathered outside the western walls of the Old Town, from where they started their journey. The Murad Pasha Mosque was the first example of an Ottoman-style building along the Road to Mecca, which is why even though the design of the minaret followed local and traditional patterns. The complex, which included a hospice for poor pilgrims, was built on an angle. As a consequence of this, the mosque complex is exceptionally visible.

== Location ==
Al-Naqshabandi Mosque is situated southwest of the old city of Damascus. From the main (western) entrance of al-Hamidiyeh Market, follow the main street, Aal albeit that runs to the south-southeast along the original boundary of the old city walls. This street will pass al-Darwishiyeh Mosque on the right, al-Sibaiyeh Mosque on the right, al-Sinaniyeh Mosque on the left, al-Ajami Mosque on the right, and al-Sabuniyeh Mosque on the right. About one hundred meters beyond this point, a road diverts to the right (southwest), leaving the Murad Pasha Mosque clearly visible on the right.

== Gallery ==
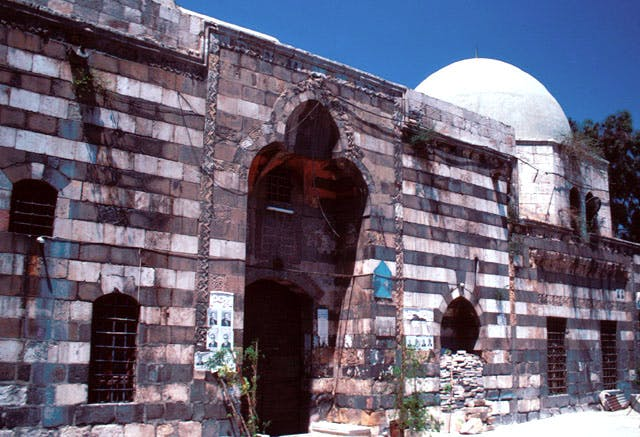
Northern façade

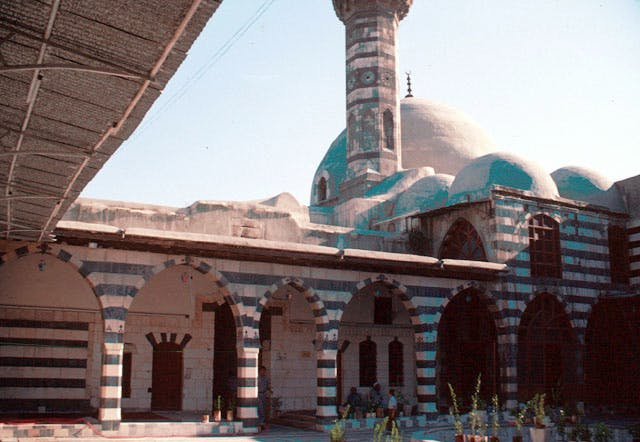
Southern view of the courtyard and mosque

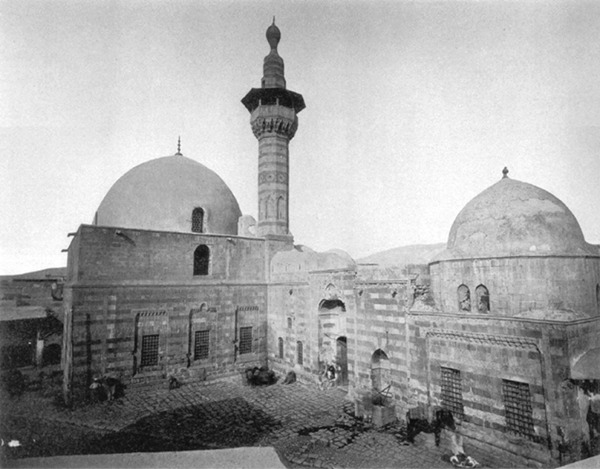
The mosque in 1880

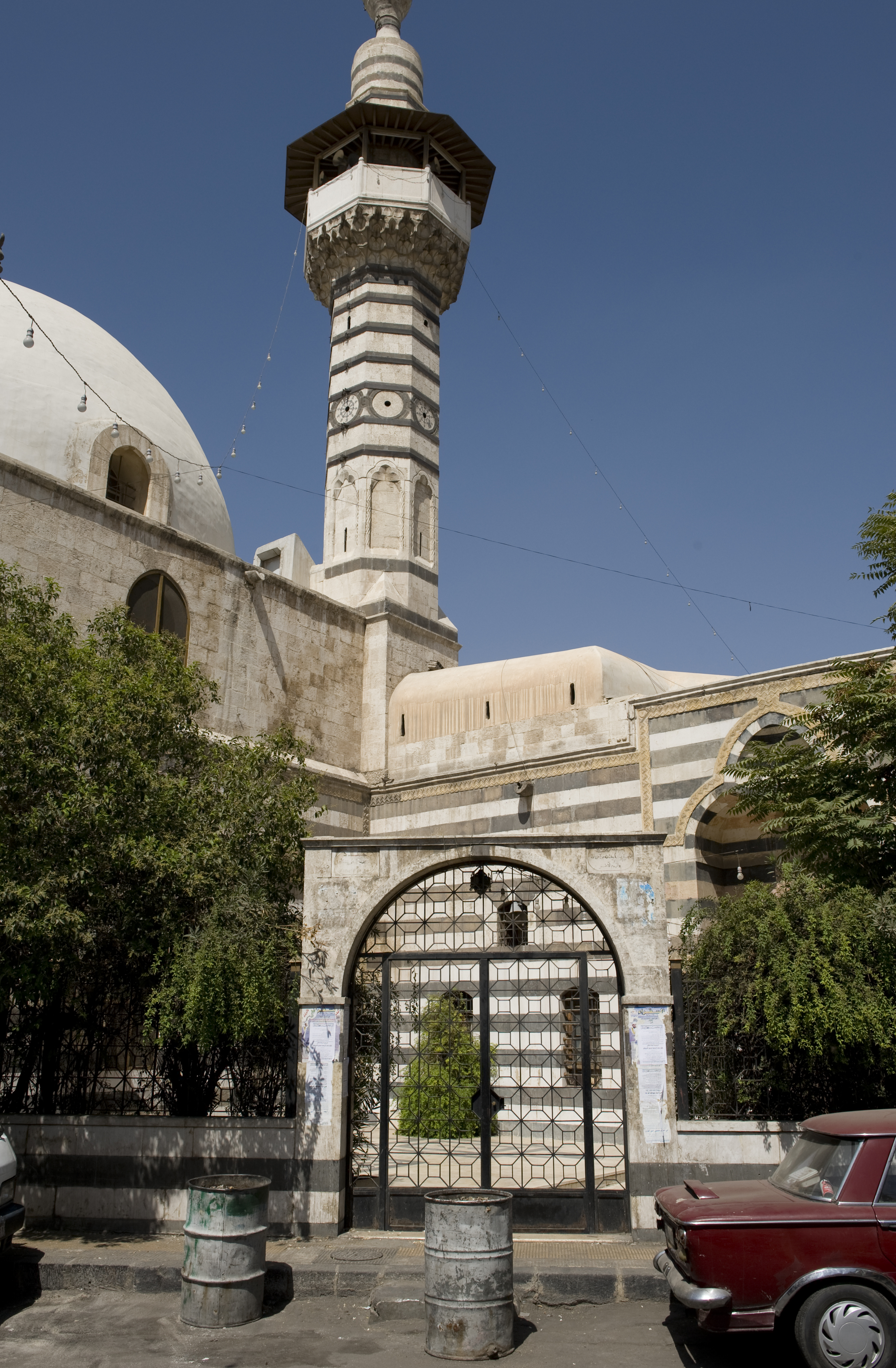
entrance

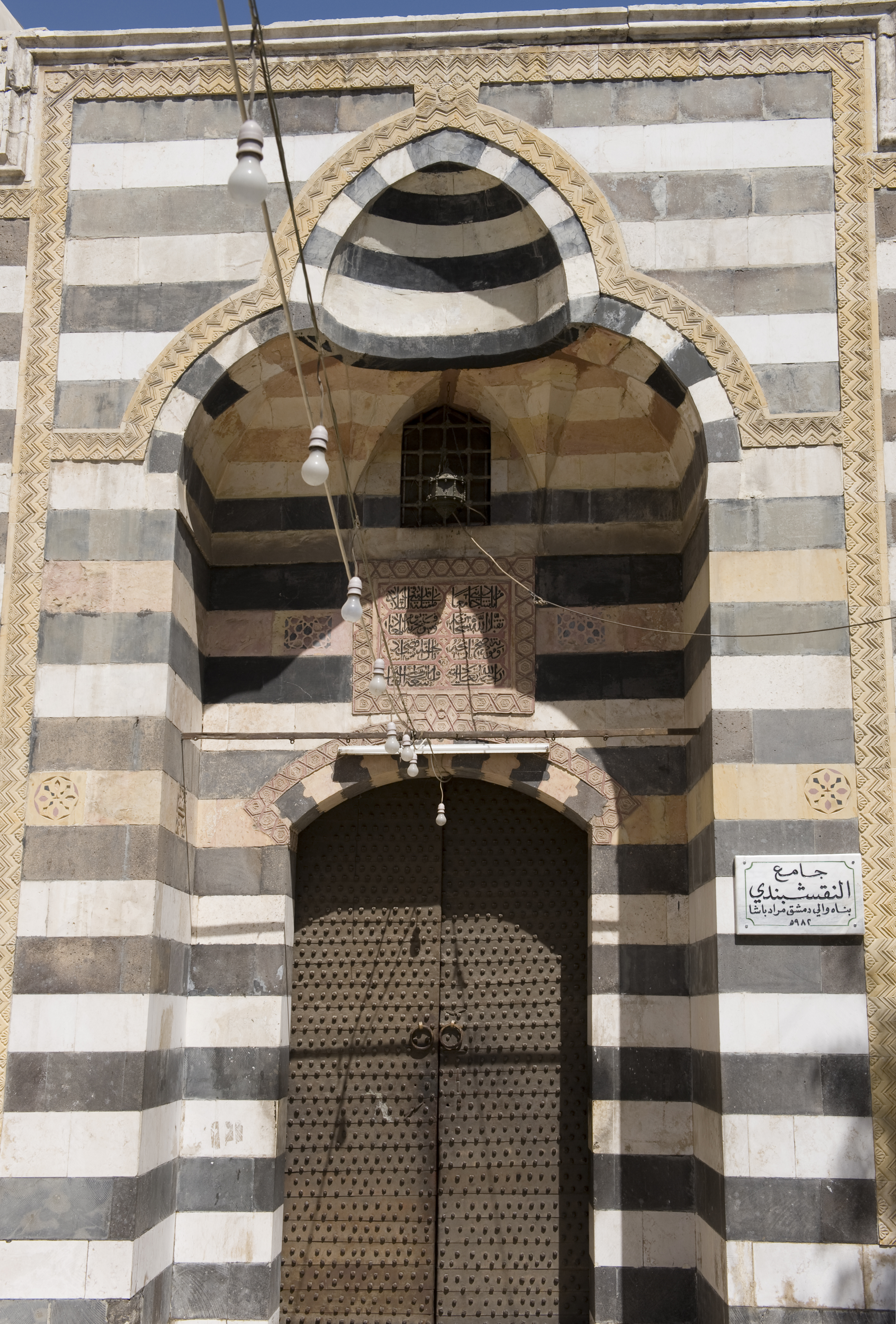
Portal

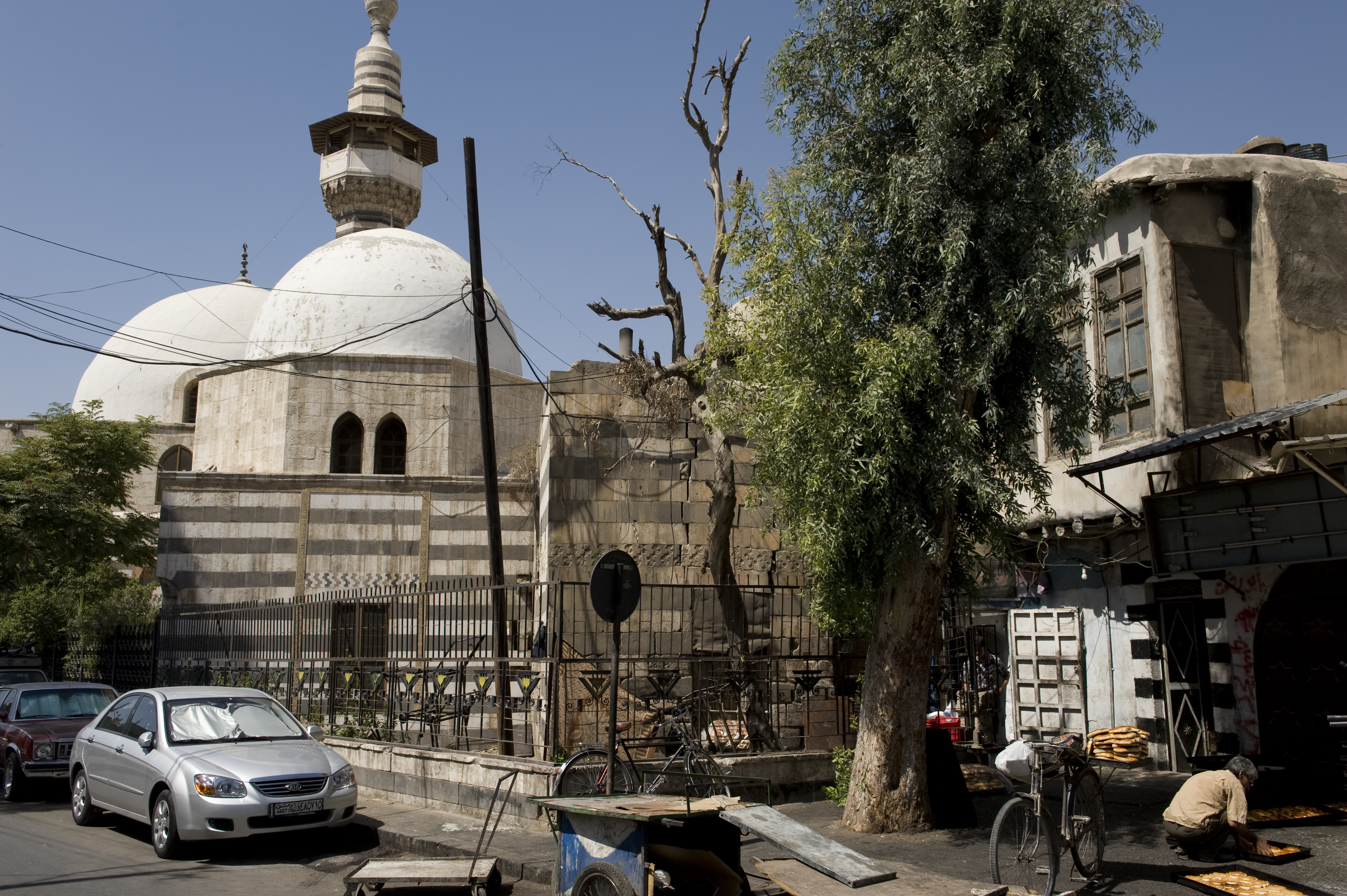
General view

== See also ==
- Islam in Syria
- List of mosques in Syria
