= Derviş =

Derviş is the Turkish and Bosnian (Derviš) spelling of the Persian and Arabic word "darwīš" (درويش), referring to a Sufi aspirant. The word appears as a given name and surname in various forms throughout Arabic, Bosnian (a Slavic language), Persian, and Turkish-speaking communities. An etymology for the name is given in the Oxford Dictionary of American Family Names:

Status name for a Sufi holy man, from Persian and Turkish derviş ‘dervish’, a member of a Sufi Muslim religious order, from Pahlavi driyosh meaning ‘beggar’, ‘one who goes from door to door’.

— Dictionary of American Family Names, Oxford University Press, ISBN 0-19-508137-4

== Given name ==
=== Derviş ===
- Derviş Ali (died 1673), Ottoman calligrapher
- Derviş Ali Kavazoğlu (1924-1965), Turkish Cypriot politician assassinated by Turkish paramilitary group TMT.
- Derviş Eroğlu (born 1938), Turkish Cypriot former president of Northern Cyprus.
- Derviş Kemal Deniz (born 1954), Turkish Cypriot politician
- Dervis Konuralp (born 1980), British Paralympic swimmer of Turkish-Cypriot descent
- Derviş Vahdeti (1870–1909), Cyprus-born Ottoman religious figure and journalist
- Derviş Zaim (born 1964), Turkish Cypriot novelist

=== Derviš ===
- Derviš-beg Alić Sarvanović, Ottoman governor of the sanjak of Montenegro
- Derviš Hadžiosmanović (born 1959), Montenegrin football coach and former player
- Derviš Sušić (1925–1990), Bosnian writer
- Derviš Korkut (1889–1969), Bosnian scholar

=== Dervish ===
- Dervish Mehmed, the title and name of several historical Ottoman people

== Surname ==
- Ahmet Derviş (1881–1932), officer of the Ottoman Army and the general of the Turkish Army
- Kemal Derviş (1949–2023), Turkish economist and politician
- Suat Derviş (1905–1972), Turkish female novelist, journalist, and political activist

== See also ==
- Dervish (disambiguation)
- Darwish
- Darvish (Sufi aspirant)
- Darvish (disambiguation)
