= Darwish Pasha (governor of Damascus) =

Ottoman governor of Damascus (1571–1574)

Darwish Pasha, also spelled Dervish Pasha, was the Ottoman beylerbey (governor-general) of Damascus Eyalet from 1571 to 1574. In 1574 he constructed an Islamic building complex consisting of a mosque, madrasa, mausoleum, and a fountain, which came to be called the Darwishiyya Madrasa after him. The governor endowed the complex as waqf for Isma'il al-Nabulsi, great-grandfather of the Sufi scholar Abd al-Ghani al-Nabulsi, and his descendants to teach the Shafi'i fiqh (jurisprudence). Isma'il attracted Turkish, Persian, and Arab students there and Darwish Pasha built a mausoleum for him at the Bab al-Saghir cemetery.

== Bibliography ==
- Rihawi, Abdulqader (1977). Damascus: Its History, Development and Artistic Heritage. Translated by Paul E. Cheveden. Damascus: Dar al-Bashar.
- Sirriyeh, Elizabeth (2005). Sufi Visionary of Ottoman Damascus: 'Abd al-Ghani al-Nabulusi, 1641–1731. Abingdon, Oxon: RoutledgeCurzon. ISBN 0-415-34165-5.
