= Naseam El-Zeyat =

Australian double murderer from Sydney

Naseam "Erdt" El-Zeyat
- Born: Sydney Australia
- Criminal charges: Murder x 3
- Penalty: 3 x Life imprisonment without parole

Naseam El-Zeyat is an Australian double murderer from Sydney, currently serving two sentences of life imprisonment without the possibility of parole for the murder of two people in October 2003.

== The murders ==
=== The Lawford Street murders: 14 October 2003 ===
El-Zeyat was convicted, along with Adnan "Eddie" Darwiche, Ramzi "Fidel" Aouad and Abass Osman, of the murders of Ziad "Ziggy" Razzak and Mervat Nemra at Greenacre on 14 October 2003. They were killed when the group fired 100 rounds at the house where they were sleeping. Their appeals against their convictions were dismissed.

=== The murder of Ahmed Fahda: 30 October 2003 ===
El-Zeyat was convicted, along with Aouad, of the murder of Ahmed Fahda at a petrol station in Punchbowl on 30 October 2003. 29 rounds were fired at Fahda, killing him. El-Zeyat and Aouad successfully appealed against their conviction and a new trial was ordered. The charges were subsequently dropped by the Director of Public Prosecutions.

== Sentencing ==
On 10 November 2006 El-Zeyat, along with Aouad, was sentenced to 3 counts of life imprisonment with no non-parole period set, Supreme Court Justice Bell noting that "notwithstanding their relative youth, I have determined that the level of culpability of Naseam El-Zeyat and Ramzi Aouad for the commission of each of these three murders is so extreme that the community's interest in retribution, punishment, community protection and deterrence can only be met through the imposition of the maximum sentence".

While El-Zeyat and Aouad successfully appealed against the conviction for the murder of Fahda, they remain serving two sentences of life imprisonment for the murders of Razzak and Nemra.
