= Adnan Darwiche =

Australian convicted murderer

Adnan "Eddie" Darwiche
- Criminal charge: Murder × 2 Attempted murder × 2
- Penalty: 2 × life imprisonment + 20 years

Adnan "Eddie" Darwiche is an Australian double murderer from Sydney, currently serving 2 sentences of life imprisonment plus 20 years without the possibility of parole for two murders and two assaults with a firearm.

== Crimes committed ==
=== Shooting of Bilal Razzak: 17 June 2001 ===
Darwiche was convicted of discharging a loaded firearm with intent to inflict grievous bodily harm to drug rival Bilal Razzak. The second gunman was suspected to be Adnan's brother Abdul, but he was never charged.

=== Yanderra Street shooting: 27 August 2003 ===
Darwiche was convicted of the attempted murder of Farouk "Frank" Razzak at Condell Park on 27 August 2003. Abdul Darwiche was also tried in relation to the shooting, but was acquitted.

=== Lawford Street murders: 14 October 2003 ===
Darwiche was convicted, along with Naseam "Erdt" El-Zeyat, Ramzi "Fidel" Aouad and Abass Osman, of the murders of Ziad "Ziggy" Razzak and Mervat Nemra at Greenacre on 14 October 2003. They were killed when the group fired 100 rounds at the house where they were sleeping.

== Sentencing ==
On 10 November 2006 Darwiche was sentenced to two counts of life imprisonment with no non-parole period set for the two murders, Supreme Court Justice Bell noting that "In my opinion the cold-blooded ruthlessness involved in the planning and execution of the Lawford Street murders is extreme and Adnan Darwiche poses an extreme danger to the community. I have concluded that Adnan Darwiche's level of culpability in the commission of the murders of Ziad Razzak and Melissa Nemra is so extreme that the community's interest in retribution, punishment, community protection and deterrence can only be met through the imposition of a life sentence." For the shooting offences, Darwiche was sentenced to 20 years imprisonment. An appeal against his conviction was dismissed.

== Murder of Abdul Darwiche ==
On 14 March 2009 Abdul Darwiche was murdered at Bass Hill. An underworld source told The Sydney Morning Herald that Adnan Darwiche had sent a message to his brother's killers from behind bars, by way of a text message reading "I'm going to kill you, even if it's kids, I don't care."

== Weapons stolen from the Australian Defence Force ==
On 30 September 2003, at the height of the Darwiche-Razzak-Fahda family conflict, Darwiche allegedly purchased a rocket launcher from Taha Abdul Rahman for $15,000 and on 9 October 2003 allegedly purchased a further 6 rocket launchers from Rahman, on-selling 5 of them to Mohammad Ali Elomar, who was allegedly involved in a plot to blow up parliament house and/or the nuclear reactor at Lucas Heights, saying "Look what is happening overseas. It is a war against Muslims. We should do something about it over here". It was thought that the rocket launchers may have been stolen from the Australian Defence Force. One of the rocket launchers was allegedly planned to be part of the 14 October 2003 Lawford Street attack but was not ultimately used.
