= Dervish Pasha Bajezidagić =

Ottoman official and poet (died 1602/3)

- Born: Unknown; Podhum district, Mostar, Ottoman Empire
- Died: 1602/3; Hungary
- Occupation(s): Official, poet
- Children: Dervishpašazade (son; died 1641)

Dervish Pasha Bajezidagić (died 1602/3) was a Bosnian official and poet under the Ottoman Empire. He served twice as the governor of his native Bosnia, wrote poetry in Persian, and translated literature from Persian into Ottoman Turkish. He played a significant role in promoting Persian literary culture in his native town of Mostar and was instrumental in localizing Persian literary traditions in the city.

== Biography ==
Born in the district (mahala) of Podhum in Mostar, in the Ottoman Eyalet of Bosnia, Dervish Pasha was an initiate of the Mevlevi Order, which had established itself in Mostar soon after the Ottoman conquest, hence his sobriquet "Dervish." Like many members of the order, he recited the Masnavi by Rumi, the renowned medieval Persian poet and mystic, in its original Persian. This language, central to Rumi’s literary and spiritual legacy, held great cultural and intellectual significance among the educated elite of the Ottoman Empire. Dervish Pasha was a student of his kinsman Ahmed Sudi in Constantinople (modern-day Istanbul).

Dervish Pasha died in 1602/1603 during an Ottoman military campaign in Hungary, where he was engaged in defending the garrison located on Csepel Island in the Danube River. His son, Aḥmed Bey Dervishpašazade (died 1641), who adopted the pen name "Ṣabuḥi", was also a member of the Mevlevi order and composed poetry in Persian and Turkish. His surviving verses are notable for their sophisticated use of Arabic vocabulary.

== Literary work ==
Influenced by his Mevlevi ties and his exposure to Persian literature through Sudi, Dervish Pasha embarked on writing a work in the style of Rumi's Masnavi. However, after completing two sections, he reportedly had a vision in which Rumi appeared and advised him to abandon the project, declaring that the Masnavi was "beyond imitation." Consequently, Dervish Pasha ceased his efforts to replicate the Masnavi, though he did compose a complete divan of Persian poetry. Additionally, at the request of Sultan Murad III (r. 1574–1595), he translated Banna'i's Sakha-nameh into Ottoman Turkish, naming his version Muradname. Some critics, such as Kâtip Çelebi, regarded his translation as superior to the original Persian work.

Dervish Pasha played a key role in promoting Persian literary culture in Mostar. He brought a prized manuscript of Muslih al-Din Sururi's commentary on Rumi's Masnavi to the city, which, along with over forty other significant works in Persian, Arabic, and Turkish, formed part of an extensive waqf (endowment) he left behind. This waqf included notable texts by Persian poets such as The Divan of Hafez, Saadi Shirazi's Gulistan, and Jami's Baharistan. Through this, Dervish Pasha institutionalized the teaching and interpretation of Persian literary classics in Mostar, embedding these works into the city's educational and cultural landscape.

In addition to promoting literary education, Dervish Pasha contributed to the physical and cultural infrastructure of Mostar by founding a mosque (Dervishpashina džamija) in 1591–1592, along with a madrasa, maktab, and library. His efforts localized Persian literary traditions in the city, ensuring that Persian works were studied, taught, and preserved, creating a lasting impact on Mostar’s multilingual and multicultural environment.

The contemporaneous historian İbrahim Peçevi defined Dervish Pasha as a "solid poet".

== Sources ==
- Algar, Hamid (2003). "BOSNIA AND HERZEGOVINA". In Yarshater, Ehsan (ed.). Encyclopædia Iranica (Online ed.). Encyclopædia Iranica Foundation.
- Pellò, Stefano (2024). "Shiraz on the Adriatic: Persian Literary Culture, Φαρσί Speakers and Multilingual Locals between Cairo, the Balkans and Venice (ca. 1600–1900)". Iran and the Caucasus. 28 (1): 42–60. doi:10.1163/1573384X-02801004. hdl:10278/5046084.
