= Darwish Pasha Mosque =

Mosque in Damascus, Syria

- جَامِع الدَرْوِيشيَّة
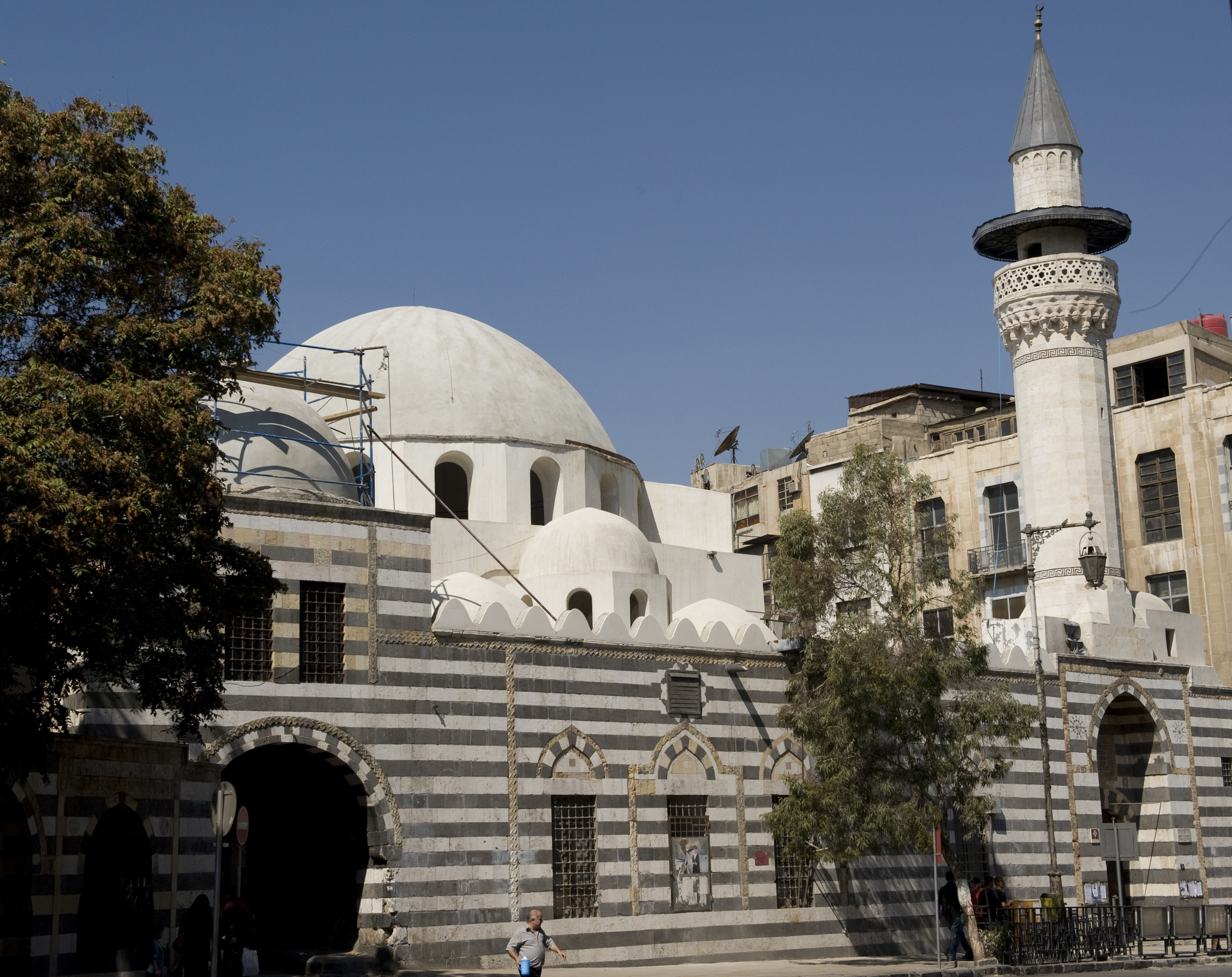

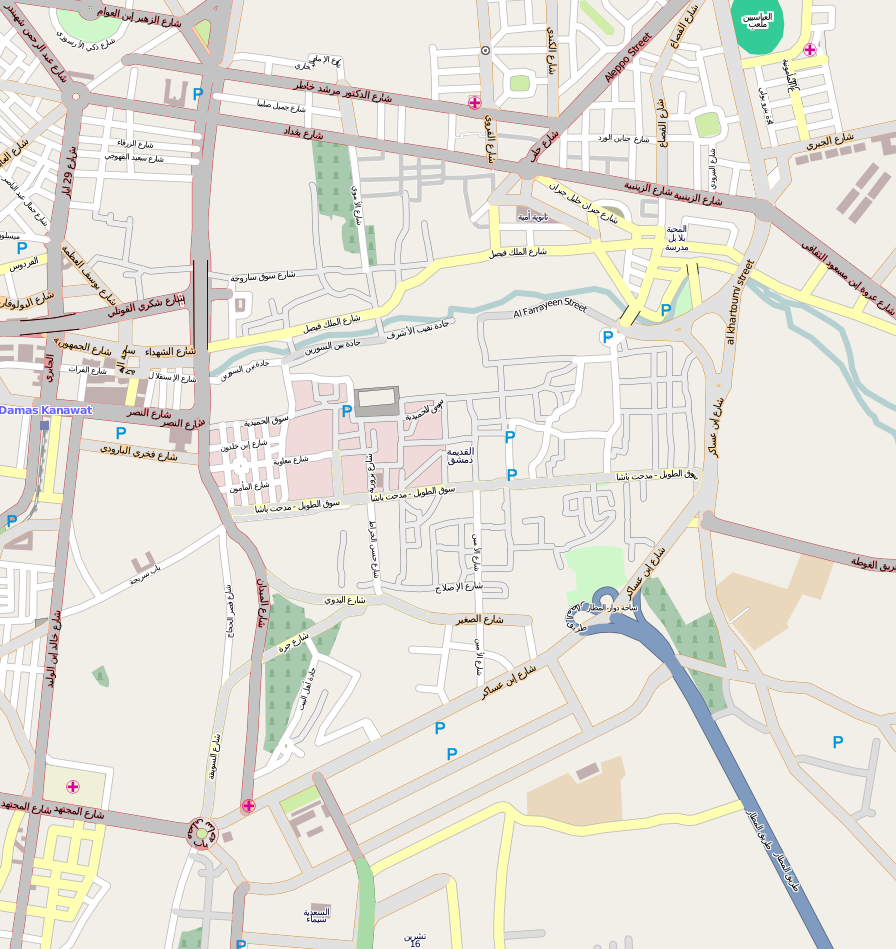
- Location within Old Damascus

Religion
- Affiliation: Islam
- Ecclesiastical or organisational status: Mosque
- Status: Active

Location
- Location: Street Called Straight, Old Damascus
- Country: Syria
- Interactive map of Darwish Pasha Mosque
- Coordinates: 33°30′34″N 36°18′01″E

Architecture
- Type: Mosque
- Style: Ottoman
- Completed: 1574 CE

Specifications
- Dome: 4
- Minaret: 1
- Materials: Stone, marble, tile

The Darwish Pasha Mosque (Arabic: جَامِع دَرْوِيش بَاشَا, romanized: Jāmiʿ Darwīš Bāšā) or Al-Darwishiyya Mosque (Arabic: جَامِع الدرويشية, romanized: Jāmiʿ al-Darwīšiyya) is a 16th-century mosque in the Old City of Damascus, Syria. The mosque was erected in 1574 CE by Darwish Pasha, the Ottoman governor of Damascus.

== See also ==
- Sunni Islam in Syria
- List of mosques in Syria
