= Bab al-Saghir =

Gate of the old city of Damascus

- باب الصغير
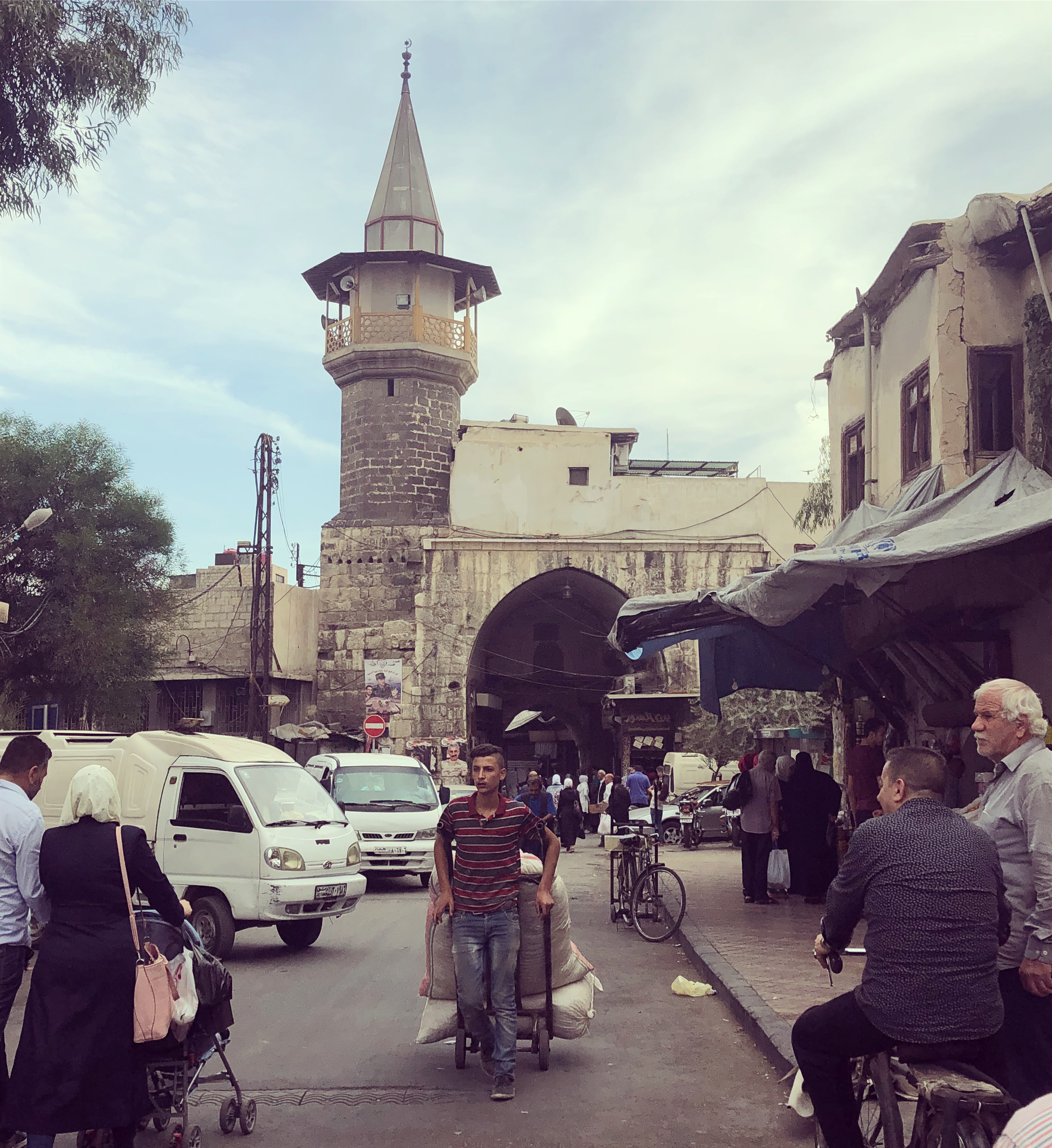
- Interactive map of Bab al-Saghir
- Location: Damascus, Syria
- Coordinates: 33°30′22″N 36°18′23″E
- Type: Gate

Bab al-Saghir (Arabic: باب الصغير, romanized: Bāb al-Ṣaghīr, lit. 'small gate') is one of the seven gates in the Old City of Damascus, Syria. It has qubūr (Arabic: قُبُوْر, graves) on either side of the road, and is located in the Dimashq Neighborhood, southwest of the Umayyad Mosque.

== History ==
The bāb (Arabic: بَاب, gate) was initially built by the Arameans, then it was dedicated to Zeus during the Seleucid era. During the Roman era, the gate was dedicated to Jupiter. In medieval times, Bab as-Saghir was the main southern entrance into Damascus. It was refortified by General Nūr al-Dīn at around 1156 (550 in Islamic years) and then later by the Ayyūbid sultans. Bab as-Saghir was constructed out of mud bricks, causing it to be the weakest entrance to the city. Because of this, it is probable that during the Siege of Damascus (1148), the Crusaders planned on concentrating their forces on the gate. Before any possible plan could be implemented, Damascus's military commander (or atabeg) Mu'in al-Din Abu Mansur Anur launched large-scale attacks on the Crusaders- made up of anyone who could fight- while strengthening the fortifications. After a four-day siege, the Crusaders withdrew from Damascus.

== Cemetery ==
Maqbarat al-Bāb aṣ-Ṣaghīr (Arabic: مَقْبَرَة ٱلْبَاب ٱلصَّغِيْر) is the ancient cemetery, which is adjacent to the gate, and is a site of significant religious importance to Muslims.

== See also ==
Media related to Bab Saghir at Wikimedia Commons

- Holiest sites in Shia Islam
  - Sayyidah Ruqayya Mosque
- Religious significance of the Syrian region
  - Sayyidah Zaynab Mosque
