= Koca Dervish Mehmed Pasha =

Grand Vizier of the Ottoman Empire from 1653 to 1654

Koca Dervish Mehmed Pasha (Adyghe: Дэруищ Мыхьмэд Пащэ; Turkish: Koca Derviş Mehmed Paşa and Bıyıkli Koca Derviş Mehmed Paşa) was an Ottoman military officer and statesman from Circassia.

He was made Kapudan Pasha (Grand Admiral) in 1652 and promoted to Grand Vizier on 21 March 1653. He held the position until 28 October 1654.

== See also ==
- List of Ottoman grand viziers
- List of Kapudan Pashas

Political offices
Preceded by Tarhoncu Ahmed Pasha	Grand Vizier of the Ottoman Empire; 21 March 1653 – 28 October 1654	Succeeded by Ibşir Mustafa Pasha
