= List of sultans of the Ottoman Empire =

Sultan of the Ottoman Empire
- عثمانلو پادشاهی (Ottoman Turkish); Osmanlı padişahı (Turkish)
- Imperial
- Imperial coat of arms (from 1882)

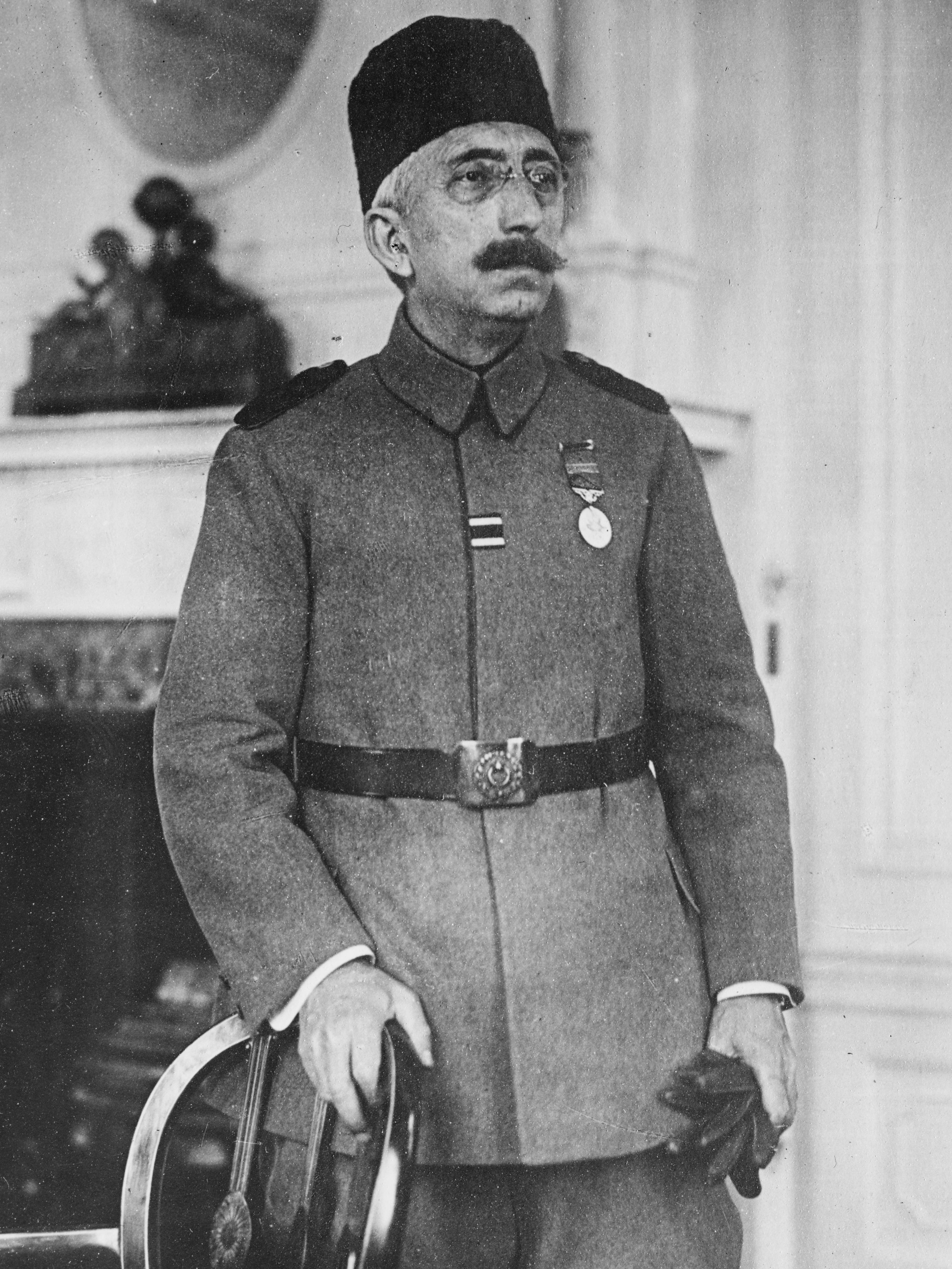
- Last to reign Mehmed VI; 4 July 1918 – 1 November 1922

Details
- Style: His Imperial Majesty
- First monarch: Osman I (c. 1299–1323/4)
- Last monarch: Mehmed VI (1918–1922)
- Formed: c. 1299
- Abolished: 1 November 1922
- Residences: Palaces in Istanbul: Eski Saray; Topkapı (1460s–1853); Dolmabahçe (1853–1889; 1909–1922); Yıldız (1889–1909)
- Appointer: Hereditary

Ottoman Imperial Standard

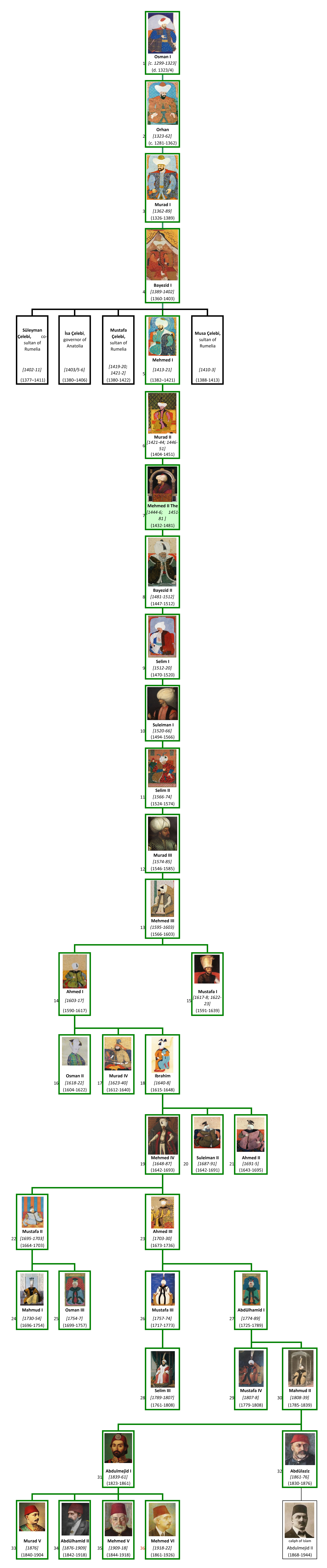
Family tree

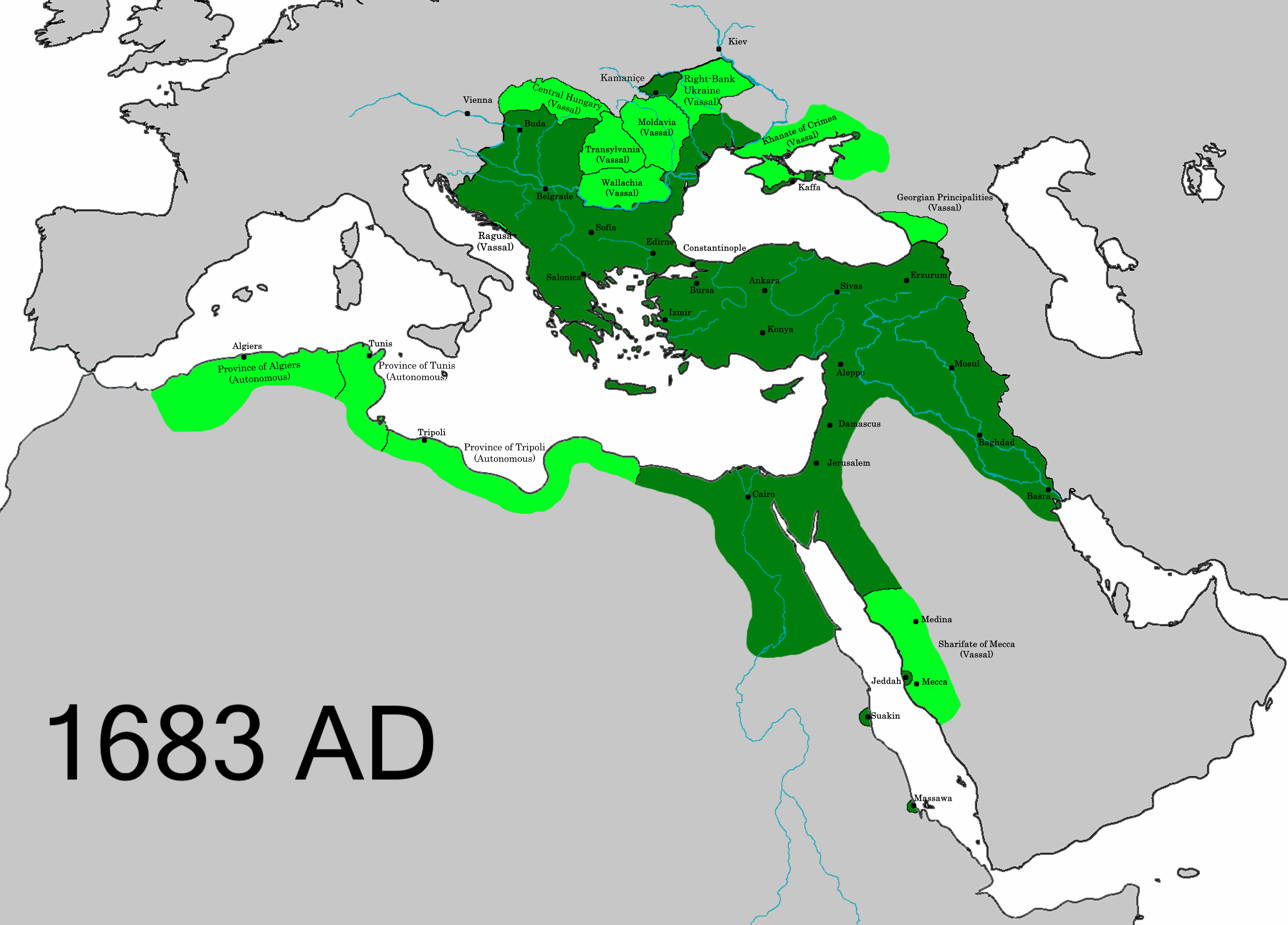
Ottoman Empire in 1683, at the height of its territorial expansion in Europe.

The sultans of the Ottoman Empire (Ottoman Turkish: عثمانلو پادشاهی; Turkish: Osmanlı padişahları), who were all members of the Ottoman dynasty (House of Osman), ruled over the transcontinental empire from its perceived inception in 1299 to its dissolution in 1922. At its height, the Ottoman Empire spanned an area from Hungary in the north to Yemen in the south and from Algeria in the west to Iraq in the east. Administered at first from the city of Söğüt from before 1280 and then from the city of Bursa from 1323 or 1324, the empire's capital was moved to Adrianople (now known as Edirne in English) in 1363 following its conquest by Murad I and then to Constantinople (present-day Istanbul) in 1453 following its conquest by Mehmed II.

The Ottoman Empire's early years have been the subject of varying narratives, due to the difficulty of discerning fact from legend. The empire came into existence at the end of the 13th century, and its first ruler (and the namesake of the Empire) was Osman I. According to later, often unreliable Ottoman tradition, Osman was a descendant of the Kayı tribe of the Oghuz Turks. The eponymous Ottoman dynasty he founded endured for six centuries through the reigns of 36 sultans. The Ottoman Empire disappeared as a result of the defeat of the Central Powers, with whom it had allied itself during World War I. The partitioning of the Empire by the victorious Allies and the ensuing Turkish War of Independence led to the abolition of the sultanate in 1922 and the proclamation of the modern Republic of Turkey in 1922.

== Names ==
The sultan was also referred to as the padishah (Ottoman Turkish: پادشاه, romanized: pâdişâh, French: Padichah). In Ottoman usage the word "Padishah" was usually used except "sultan" was used when he was directly named. In several European languages, he was referred to as the Grand Turk, as the ruler of the Turks, or simply the "Great Lord" (il Gran Signore, le grand seigneur) especially in the 16th century.

Names of the sultan in languages used by ethnic minorities:

- Arabic: In some documents padishah was replaced by malik (ملك, 'king')
- Bulgarian: In earlier periods Bulgarian people called him the tsar (цар). The translation of the Ottoman Constitution of 1876 instead used direct translations of sultan (Султан Sultan) and padishah (Падишах Padišax)
- Greek: In earlier periods the Greeks used the Byzantine Empire-style name basileus (Βασιλεύς). The translation of the Ottoman Constitution of 1876 instead used a direct transliterations of sultan (Σουλτάνος Soultanos) and padishah (Παδισαχ padisach).
- Judaeo-Spanish: Especially in older documents, El Rey ('the king') was used. In addition some Ladino documents used sultan (in Hebrew characters: שולטן and סולטן).

== State organisation of the Ottoman Empire ==
The Ottoman Empire was an absolute monarchy during much of its existence. By the second half of the fifteenth century, the sultan sat at the apex of a hierarchical system and acted in political, military, judicial, social, and religious capacities under a variety of titles.^{[a]} He was theoretically responsible only to God and divine law (the Islamic شریعت şeriat, known in Arabic as شريعة sharia), of which he was the chief executor. His heavenly mandate (Kut) was reflected in Islamic titles such as "shadow of God on Earth" (ظل الله في العالم ẓıll Allāh fī'l-ʿalem) and "caliph of the face of the earth" (خلیفه روی زمین Ḫalife-i rū-yi zemīn). All offices were filled by his authority, and every law was issued by him in the form of a decree called firman (فرمان). He was the supreme military commander and had the official title to all land. Osman (died 1323/4) son of Ertuğrul was the first ruler of the Ottoman state, which during his reign constituted a small principality (beylik) in the region of Bithynia on the frontier of the Byzantine Empire.

After the conquest of Constantinople in 1453 by Mehmed II, Ottoman sultans came to regard themselves as the successors of the Roman Empire, hence their occasional use of the titles caesar (قیصر qayser) of Rûm, and emperor, as well as the caliph of Islam.^{[b]} Newly enthroned Ottoman rulers were girded with the Sword of Osman, an important ceremony that served as the equivalent of European monarchs' coronation. A non-girded sultan was not eligible to have his children included in the line of succession.

Although absolute in theory and in principle, the sultan's powers were limited in practice. Political decisions had to take into account the opinions and attitudes of important members of the dynasty, the bureaucratic and military establishments, as well as religious leaders. Beginning in the last decades of the sixteenth century, the role of the Ottoman sultans in the government of the empire began to decrease, in a period known as the Transformation of the Ottoman Empire. Despite being barred from inheriting the throne, women of the imperial harem—especially the reigning sultan's mother, known as the valide sultan—also played an important behind-the-scenes political role, effectively ruling the empire during the period known as the Sultanate of Women.

Constitutionalism was established during the reign Abdul Hamid II, who thus became the empire's last absolute ruler and its reluctant first constitutional monarch. Although Abdul Hamid II abolished the parliament and the constitution to return to personal rule in 1878, he was again forced in 1908 to reinstall constitutionalism and was deposed. Since 2021, the head of the Osmanoğlu family has been Harun Osman, a great-grandson of Abdul Hamid II.

== List of sultans ==
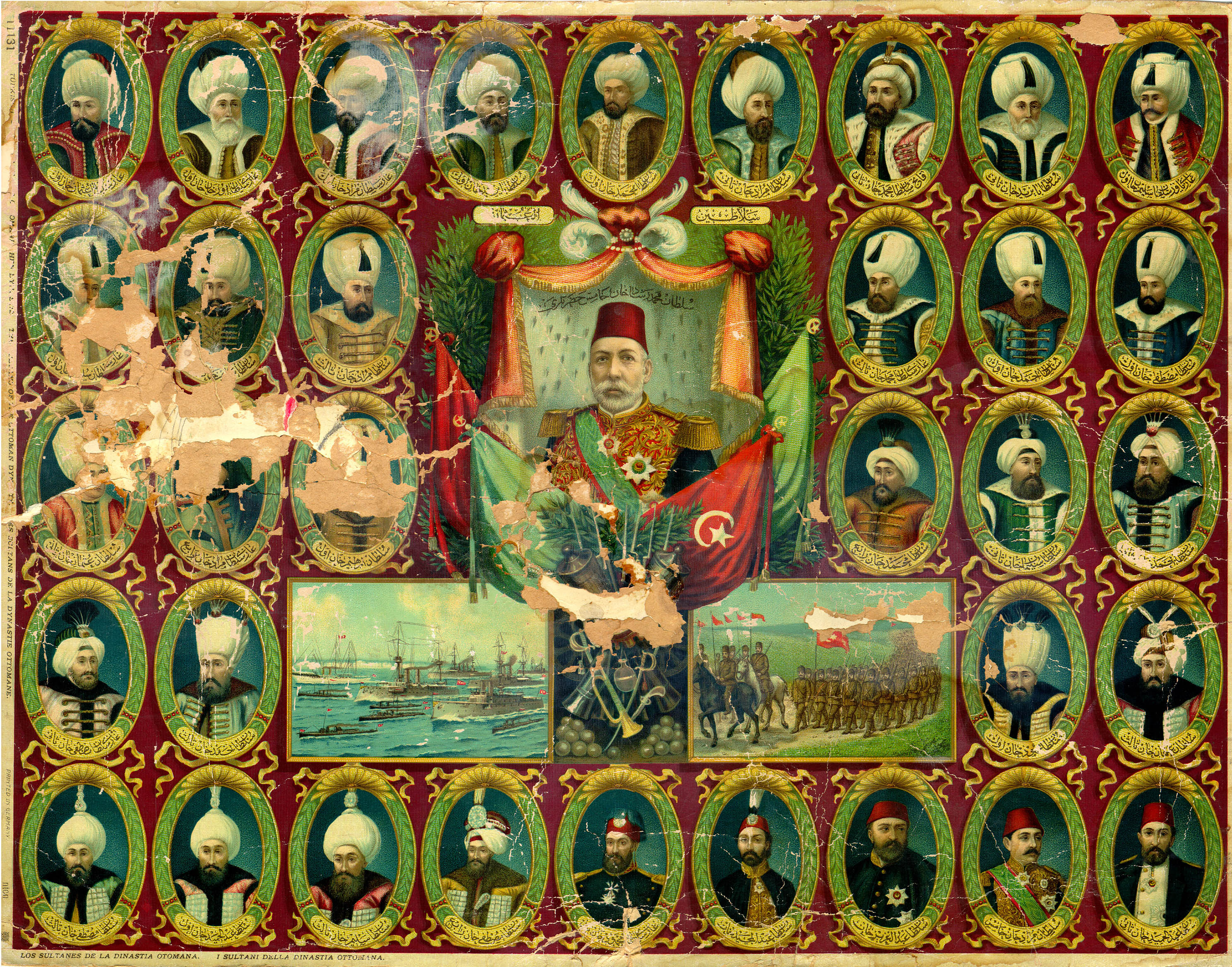
Poster showing sultans of the Ottoman dynasty, from Osman I (upper left corner) to Mehmed V (large portrait in the center)

The table below lists Ottoman sultans, as well as the last Ottoman caliph, in chronological order. The tughras were the calligraphic seals or signatures used by Ottoman sultans. They were displayed on all official documents as well as on coins, and were far more important in identifying a sultan than his portrait. The "Notes" column contains information on each sultan's parentage and fate. Early Ottomans practiced what historian Quataert has described as "survival of the fittest, not eldest, son": when a sultan died, his sons had to fight each other for the throne until a victor emerged. Because of the infighting and numerous fratricides that occurred, there was often a time gap between a sultan's death date and the accession date of his successor. In 1617, the law of succession changed from survival of the fittest to a system based on agnatic seniority (اکبریت ekberiyet), whereby the throne went to the oldest male of the family. This in turn explains why from the 17th century onwards a deceased sultan was rarely succeeded by his own son, but usually by an uncle or brother. Agnatic seniority was retained until the abolition of the sultanate, despite unsuccessful attempts in the 19th century to replace it with primogeniture. Note that pretenders and co-claimants during the Ottoman Interregnum are also listed here, but they are not included in the formal numbering of sultans.

No.	Sultan	Portrait	Reign	Tughra	Notes	Coinage
Rise of the Ottoman Empire (1299–1453)
1	Osman I		c. 1299 – c. 1324 (25 years~)	—N/a^{[c]}	Son of Ertuğrul Bey and an unknown woman.; Reigned until his death.	
2	Orhan		c. 1324 – March 1362 (38 years~)	Tughra of Orhan	Son of Osman I and Malhun Hatun (unclear).; Reigned until his death.	
3	Murad I^{[b]}		March 1362 – 15 June 1389 (27 years, 3 months)	Tughra of Murad I	Son of Orhan and Nilüfer Hatun.; Reigned until his death.; Killed on the battlefield at the Battle of Kosovo on June 15, 1389.	
—	Savcı Bey		1373	—N/a	Son of Murad I.; Rebelled against his father alongside Andronikos IV Palaiologos.; Blinded and perhaps executed by his father.	
4	Bayezid I		15 June 1389 – 20 July 1402 (13 years, 35 days)	Tughra of Bayezid I	Son of Murad I and Gülçiçek Hatun.; Captured on the battlefield at the Battle of Ankara against Timur.; Died in captivity in Akşehir on 8 March 1403.	
Ottoman Interregnum^{[d]} (20 July 1402 – 5 July 1413)
—	İsa Çelebi		January – March/May 1403 (3–5 months)	—N/a	Co-sultan of Anatolia; After the Battle of Ankara, İsa Çelebi defeated Musa Çelebi and took the western Anatolian territories for approximately two years.; Defeated by Mehmed Çelebi in the Battle of Ulubad in March or May 1403.; Strangled in September 1403.	—N/a
—	Süleyman Çelebi (Note: Contemporary sources mention him as a legitimate sultan, but this view is not accepted today.)		20 July 1402 – 17 February 1411 (8 years, 212 days)		Acquired the title of The Sultan of Rumelia for the European portion of the empire, a short period after the Ottoman defeat at Ankara.; Murdered on 17 February 1411.	
—	Musa Çelebi		18 February 1411 – 5 July 1413 (2 years, 137 days)	—N/a	Acquired the title of The Sultan of Rumelia for the European portion of the empire on 18 February 1411, just after the death of Süleyman Çelebi.; Killed on 5 July 1413 by Mehmed Çelebi's forces in the battle of Çamurlu Derbent near Samokov in Bulgaria.	
—	Mehmed Çelebi		1403 – 5 July 1413 (10 years)	—N/a	Acquired the control of Eastern Anatolia as co-Sultan after the Battle of Ankara.; Defeated İsa Çelebi in the battle of Ulubat in 1405.; Became the sole ruler of Anatolia upon İsa's death in 1406.; Acquired the title of Ottoman Sultan Mehmed I Khan upon Musa's death.	
Sultanate resumed
5	Mehmed I		5 July 1413 – 26 May 1421 (7 years, 325 days)	Tughra of Mehmed I	Son of Bayezid I and Devlet Hatun.; Reigned until his death.	—N/a
—	Mustafa Çelebi	—N/a	January 1419 – May 1422 (3 years, 4 months)	—N/a	Sultan of Rumelia; Son of Bayezid I; Executed by Murad II	
6	Murad II		25 June 1421 – August 1444 (23 years, 1 month)	Tughra of Murad II	Son of Mehmed I and Emine Hatun.; Abdicated of his own free will in favour of his son Mehmed II.	
7	Mehmed II		August 1444 – September 1446 (2 years, 1 month)	Tughra of Mehmed II	First reign; Son of Murad II and Hüma Hatun.; Surrendered the throne to his father after having asked him to return to power, along with rising threats from Janissaries.	
(6)	Murad II		September 1446 – 3 February 1451 (4 years, 5 months)	Tughra of Murad II	Second reign; Forced to return to the throne following a Janissary insurgence.; Reigned until his death.	—N/a
Growth of the Ottoman Empire (1453–1550)
(7)	Mehmed II		3 February 1451 – 3 May 1481 (30 years, 89 days)	Tughra of Mehmed II	Second reign; Conquered Constantinople in 1453.; Reigned until his death.	
8	Bayezid II		19 May 1481 – 25 April 1512 (30 years, 342 days)	Tughra of Bayezid II	Son of Mehmed II and Gülbahar Hatun.; Abdicated.; Died near Didymoteicho on 26 May 1512.	
—	Cem Sultan		28 May – 20 June 1481 (23 days)	Tughra of Cem	Son of Mehmed II; Acquired the title Cem bin Mehmed Han.; Died in exile	
9	Selim I		25 April 1512 – 21 September 1520 (8 years, 149 days)	Tughra of Selim I	Conquered Mamluks in 1516–1517.; First Ottoman Caliph.; Son of Bayezid II and Gülbahar Hatun.; Reigned until his death.	
10	Suleiman I		30 September 1520 – 6 September 1566 (45 years, 341 days)	Tughra of Suleiman I	Son of Selim I and Hafsa Sultan.; Died of natural causes in his tent during the Siege of Szigetvár in 1566.	
Transformation of the Ottoman Empire (1550–1700)
11	Selim II		29 September 1566 – 15 December 1574 (8 years, 77 days)	Tughra of Selim II	Son of Suleiman I and Hürrem Sultan.; Reigned until his death.	
12	Murad III		27 December 1574 – 16 January 1595 (20 years, 20 days)	Tughra of Murad III	Son of Selim II and Nurbanu Sultan.; Reigned until his death.	
13	Mehmed III		16 January 1595 – 22 December 1603 (8 years, 340 days)	Tughra of Mehmed III	Son of Murad III and Safiye Sultan.; Reigned until his death	
14	Ahmed I		22 December 1603 – 22 November 1617 (13 years, 335 days)	Tughra of Ahmed I	Son of Mehmed III and Handan Sultan.; Reigned until his death.	
15	Mustafa I		22 November 1617 – 26 February 1618 (96 days)	Tughra of Mustafa I	Son of Mehmed III and Halime Sultan.; Deposed due to his mental instability in favour of his young nephew Osman II.	
16	Osman II		26 February 1618 – 19 May 1622 (4 years, 82 days)	Tughra of Osman II	Son of Ahmed I and Mahfiruz Hatun.; Deposed in a Janissary revolt on 19 May 1622.; Murdered on 20 May 1622 by the Grand Vizier Kara Davud Pasha.	
(15)	Mustafa I		20 May 1622 – 10 September 1623 (1 year, 113 days)	Tughra of Mustafa I	Second reign.; Returned to the throne after the assassination of his nephew Osman II.; Deposed due to his poor mental health and confined until his death in Istanbul on 20 January 1639.	
17	Murad IV		10 September 1623 – 8 February 1640 (16 years, 151 days)	Tughra of Murad IV	Son of Ahmed I and Kösem Sultan.; Ruled under the regency of his mother Kösem Sultan until 1632.; Reigned until his death.	
18	Ibrahim		9 February 1640 – 8 August 1648 (8 years, 181 days)	Tughra of Ibrahim	Son of Ahmed I and Kösem Sultan.; Deposed on 8 August 1648 in a coup led by the Sheikh ul-Islam.; Strangled in Istanbul on 18 August 1648 at the behest of the Grand Vizier Mevlevî Mehmed Paşa (Sofu Mehmed Pasha).	
19	Mehmed IV		8 August 1648 – 8 November 1687 (39 years, 92 days)	Tughra of Mehmed IV	Son of Ibrahim and Turhan Sultan.; Ruled under the regency of his grandmother Kösem Sultan until 1651.; Ruled under the regency of his mother Turhan Sultan from 1651 until 1656.; Deposed on 8 November 1687 following the Ottoman defeat at the Second Battle of Mohács.; Died in Edirne on 6 January 1693.	
20	Suleiman II		8 November 1687 – 22 June 1691 (3 years, 226 days)	Tughra of Suleiman II	Son of Ibrahim and Dilaşub Sultan.; Reigned until his death.	
21	Ahmed II		22 June 1691 – 6 February 1695 (3 years, 229 days)	Tughra of Ahmed II	Son of Ibrahim and Muazzez Sultan.; Reigned until his death.	
22	Mustafa II		6 February 1695 – 22 August 1703 (8 years, 197 days)	Tughra of Mustafa II	Son of Mehmed IV and Gülnuş Sultan.; Deposed on 22 August 1703 by a Janissary uprising known as the Edirne Event.; Died in Istanbul on 8 January 1704.	
Stagnation and reform of the Ottoman Empire (1700–1827)
23	Ahmed III		22 August 1703 – 1 October 1730 (27 years, 40 days)	Tughra of Ahmed III	Son of Mehmed IV and Gülnuş Sultan.; Deposed in consequence of the Janissary rebellion led by Patrona Halil.; Died on 1 July 1736.	
24	Mahmud I		2 October 1730 – 13 December 1754 (24 years, 72 days)	Tughra of Mahmud I	Son of Mustafa II and Saliha Sultan.; Reigned until his death.	
25	Osman III		13 December 1754 – 30 October 1757 (2 years, 321 days)	Tughra of Osman III	Son of Mustafa II and Şehsuvar Sultan.; Reigned until his death.	
26	Mustafa III		30 October 1757 – 21 January 1774 (16 years, 83 days)	Tughra of Mustafa III	Son of Ahmed III and Mihrişah Kadın.; Reigned until his death.	
27	Abdul Hamid I		21 January 1774 – 7 April 1789 (15 years, 76 days)	Tughra of Abdul Hamid I	Son of Ahmed III and Rabia Şermi Kadın.; Reigned until his death.	
28	Selim III		7 April 1789 – 29 May 1807 (18 years, 52 days)	Tughra of Selim III	Son of Mustafa III and Mihrişah Sultan.; Deposed as a result of the Janissary revolt led by Kabakçı Mustafa against his reforms.; Assassinated in Istanbul on 28 July 1808 at the behest of Mustafa IV.	
29	Mustafa IV		29 May 1807 – 28 July 1808 (1 year, 60 days)	Tughra of Mustafa IV	Son of Abdul Hamid I and Sineperver Sultan.; Deposed in an insurrection led by Alemdar Mustafa Pasha.; Executed in Istanbul on 17 November 1808 by order of Mahmud II.	
Modernization of the Ottoman Empire (1827–1908)
30	Mahmud II		28 July 1808 – 1 July 1839 (30 years, 338 days)	Tughra of Mahmud II	Son of Abdul Hamid I and Nakşidil Sultan.; Disbanded the Janissaries in consequence of the Auspicious Incident in 1826.; Reigned until his death.	
31	Abdul Mejid I		1 July 1839 – 25 June 1861 (21 years, 359 days)	Tughra of Abdulmejid I	Son of Mahmud II and Bezmiâlem Sultan.; Proclaimed the Imperial Edict of Gülhane (Tanzimât Fermânı) that launched the Tanzimat period of reforms and reorganization on 3 November 1839 at the behest of reformist Grand vizier Mustafa Reşid Pasha.; Accepted the Islâhat Hatt-ı Hümayun (Imperial Reform Edict) (Islâhat Fermânı) on 18 February 1856.; Reigned until his death.	
32	Abdul Aziz		25 June 1861 – 30 May 1876 (14 years, 340 days)	Tughra of Abdulaziz	Son of Mahmud II and Pertevniyal Sultan.; Deposed by his ministers.; Found dead (suicide or murder) five days later.	
33	Murad V		30 May – 31 August 1876 (93 days)	Tughra of Murad V	Son of Abdul Mejid I and Şevkefza Sultan.; Deposed due to his ill mental health.; Ordered to reside in Çırağan Palace where he died on 29 August 1904.	
34	Abdul Hamid II		31 August 1876 – 27 April 1909 (32 years, 239 days)	Tughra of Abdul Hamid II	Son of Abdul Mejid I and Tirimüjgan Kadın (later became the adoptive son of Rahime Perestu Sultan).; Reluctantly allowed the First Constitutional Era on 23 November 1876 and then suspended it on 13 February 1878.; Forced to restore the Constitution on 3 July 1908.; Deposed after the 31 March incident.; Confined to Beylerbeyi Palace where he died on 10 February 1918.	
35	Mehmed V Reşâd		27 April 1909 – 3 July 1918 (9 years, 67 days)	Tughra of Mehmed V	Son of Abdul Mejid I and Gülcemal Kadın (later became the adoptive son of Servetseza Kadın).; Reigned as a figurehead of Mehmed Talat, İsmail Enver, and Ahmed Cemal Pashas.; Reigned until his death.	
36	Mehmed VI Vahideddin		4 July 1918 – 1 November 1922 (4 years, 120 days)	Tughra of Mehmed VI	Son of Abdul Mejid I and Gülistu Kadın (later became the adoptive son of Şayeste Hanım); Sultanate abolished.; Left Istanbul on 17 November 1922.; Died in exile in Sanremo, Italy on 16 May 1926.	
Caliph under the Grand National Assembly of Turkey (1 November 1922 – 3 March 1924)
—	Abdul Mejid II		19 November 1922 – 3 March 1924 (1 year, 106 days)	—^{[c]}	Son of Abdul Aziz and Hayranidil Kadın; Exiled after the abolition of the Caliphate; Died in Paris, France on 23 August 1944.	—

== See also ==
- Line of succession to the Ottoman throne
- Ottoman sultan family tree
- Ottoman family tree (more detailed)
- Valide sultan
- List of Ottoman grand viziers

== Notes ==
a: The full style of the Ottoman ruler was complex, as it was composed of several titles and evolved over the centuries. The title of sultan was used continuously by all rulers almost from the beginning. However, because it was widespread in the Muslim world, the Ottomans quickly adopted variations of it to dissociate themselves from other Muslim rulers of lesser status. Murad I, the third Ottoman monarch, styled himself sultân-ı âzam (سلطان اعظم, the most exalted sultan) and hüdavendigar (خداوندگار, emperor), titles used by the Anatolian Seljuqs and the Mongol Ilkhanids respectively. His son Bayezid I adopted the style Sultan of Rûm, Rûm being an old Islamic name for the Roman Empire. The combining of the Islamic and Central Asian heritages of the Ottomans led to the adoption of the title that became the standard designation of the Ottoman ruler: Sultan [Name] Khan. Ironically, although the title of sultan is most often associated in the Western world with the Ottomans, people within Turkey generally use the title of padishah far more frequently when referring to rulers of the Ottoman Dynasty.
b^{1} ^{2} ^{3} : The Ottoman Caliphate symbolized their spiritual power, whereas the sultanate represented their temporal power. According to Ottoman historiography, Murad I adopted the title of caliph during his reign (1362 to 1389), and Selim I later strengthened the caliphal authority during his conquest of Egypt in 1516-1517. However, the general consensus among modern scholars is that Ottoman rulers had used the title of caliph before the conquest of Egypt, as early as during the reign of Murad I (1362–1389), who brought most of the Balkans under Ottoman rule and established the title of sultan in 1383. It is currently agreed that the caliphate "disappeared" for two-and-a-half centuries, before being revived with the Treaty of Küçük Kaynarca, signed between the Ottoman Empire and Catherine II of Russia in 1774. The treaty was highly symbolic, since it marked the first international recognition of the Ottomans' claim to the caliphate. Although the treaty made official the Ottoman Empire's loss of the Crimean Khanate, it acknowledged the Ottoman caliph's continuing religious authority over Muslims in Russia. From the 18th century onwards, Ottoman sultans increasingly emphasized their status as caliphs in order to stir Pan-Islamist sentiments among the empire's Muslims in the face of encroaching European imperialism. When World War I broke out, Caliph Mehmed V issued a proclamation for jihad in 1914 against the Ottoman Empire's Allied enemies, unsuccessfully attempting to incite the subjects of the French, British and Russian empires to revolt. Abdul Hamid II was by far the Ottoman sultan who made the most use of his caliphal position, and was recognized as caliph by many Muslim heads of state, even as far away as the Philippines and Sumatra. He had his claim to the title inserted into the 1876 Constitution (Article 4).
c^{1} ^{2} : Tughras were used by 35 out of 36 Ottoman sultans, starting with Orhan in the 14th century, whose tughra has been found on two different documents. No tughra bearing the name of Osman I, the founder of the empire, has ever been discovered, although a coin with the inscription "Osman bin Ertuğrul" has been identified. Abdulmejid II, the last Ottoman Caliph, also lacked a tughra of his own, since he did not serve as head of state (that position being held by Mustafa Kemal, President of the newly founded Republic of Turkey) but as a religious and royal figurehead.
d: The Ottoman Interregnum, also known as the Ottoman Triumvirate (Turkish: Fetret Devri), was a period of chaos in the Ottoman Empire which lasted from 1402 to 1413. It started following the defeat and capture of Bayezid I by the Turco-Mongol warlord Tamerlane at the Battle of Ankara, which was fought on 20 July 1402. Bayezid's sons fought each other for over a decade, until Mehmed I emerged as the undisputed victor in 1413.
e: The dissolution of the Ottoman Empire was a gradual process which started with the abolition of the sultanate and ended with that of the caliphate 16 months later. The sultanate was formally abolished on 1 November 1922. Sultan Mehmed VI fled to Malta on 17 November aboard the British warship Malaya. This event marked the end of the Ottoman Dynasty, not of the Ottoman State nor of the Ottoman Caliphate. On 19 November, the Grand National Assembly (TBMM) elected Mehmed VI's cousin Abdulmejid II, the then crown prince, as caliph. The official end of the Ottoman State was declared through the Treaty of Lausanne (24 July 1923), which recognized the new "Ankara government," and not the old Istanbul-based Ottoman government, as representing the rightful owner and successor state. The Republic of Turkey was proclaimed by the TBMM on 29 October 1923, with Mustafa Kemal as its first President. Although Abdulmejid II was a figurehead lacking any political power, he remained in his position of Caliph until the office of the Caliphate was abolished by the TBMM on 3 March 1924. Mehmed VI later tried unsuccessfully to reinstall himself as caliph in the Hejaz.

== Bibliography ==
- Aşiroğlu, Orhan Gâzi (1992). Son halife, Abdülmecid. Tarihin şahitleri dizisi (in Turkish). Istanbul: Burak Yayınevi. ISBN 978-9757645177. OCLC 32085609.
- Findley, Carter V. (2005). The Turks in World History. New York: Oxford University Press US. ISBN 978-0-19-517726-8. OCLC 54529318.
- Finkel, Caroline (2007). Osman's Dream: The History of the Ottoman Empire. Basic Books. ISBN 978-0465008506.
- Glassé, Cyril, ed. (2003). "Ottomans". The New Encyclopedia of Islam. Walnut Creek, CA: AltaMira Press. ISBN 978-0-7591-0190-6. OCLC 52611080.
- Glazer, Steven A. (1996) [Research completed January 1995]. "Chapter 1: Historical Setting". In Metz, Helen Chapin (ed.). A Country Study: Turkey. Country Studies (5th ed.). Washington, D.C.: Federal Research Division of the Library of Congress. ISBN 978-0-8444-0864-4. OCLC 33898522.
- Jorga, Nicholae (2009). Geschishte des Osmanichen. Vol. 1. Translated by Nilüfer Epçeli. Istanbul: Yeditepe yayınları. ISBN 978-975-6480-17-5.
- Kafadar, Cemal (1995). Between Two Worlds: The Construction of the Ottoman State. Berkeley, CA: University of California Press. ISBN 978-0-520-20600-7. OCLC 55849447.
- Karateke, Hakan T. (2005). "Who is the Next Ottoman Sultan? Attempts to Change the Rule of Succession during the Nineteenth Century". In Weismann, Itzchak; Zachs, Fruma (eds.). Ottoman Reform and Muslim Regeneration: Studies in Honour of Butrus Abu-Manneb. London: I.B. Tauris. ISBN 978-1-85043-757-4. OCLC 60416792.
- Lindner, Rudi Paul (1983). Nomads and Ottomans in Medieval Anatolia. Indiana University Press.
- Lowry, Heath (2003). The Nature of the Early Ottoman State. SUNY Press. ISBN 0-7914-5636-6.
- d'Osman Han, Nadine Sultana (2001). The Legacy of Sultan Abdulhamid II: Memoirs and Biography of Sultan Selim bin Hamid Han. Foreword by Manoutchehr M. Eskandari-Qajar. Santa Fe, NM: Sultana Pub. OCLC 70659193. Archived from the original on 2009-01-05.
- Peirce, Leslie P. (1993). The Imperial Harem: Women and Sovereignty in the Ottoman Empire. New York: Oxford University Press US. ISBN 978-0-19-508677-5. OCLC 243767445.
- Quataert, Donald (2005). The Ottoman Empire, 1700–1922 (2nd ed.). Cambridge University Press. ISBN 978-0-521-83910-5. OCLC 59280221.
- Stavrides, Theoharis (2001). The Sultan of Vezirs: The Life and Times of the Ottoman Grand Vezir Mahmud Pasha Angelović (1453–1474). Leiden: Brill Publishers. ISBN 978-90-04-12106-5. OCLC 46640850.
- Strauss, Johann (2010). "A Constitution for a Multilingual Empire: Translations of the Kanun-ı Esasi and Other Official Texts into Minority Languages". In Herzog, Christoph; Malek Sharif (eds.). The First Ottoman Experiment in Democracy. Würzburg: Orient-Institut Istanbul. (info page on book at Martin Luther University) // CITED: pp. 43–44 (PDF pp. 45–46/338).
- Sugar, Peter F. (1993). Southeastern Europe under Ottoman Rule, 1354–1804 (3rd ed.). Seattle: University of Washington Press. ISBN 978-0-295-96033-3. OCLC 34219399.
- Toprak, Binnaz (1981). Islam and Political Development in Turkey. Leiden: Brill Publishers. ISBN 978-90-04-06471-3. OCLC 8258992.
- Toynbee, Arnold J. (1974). "The Ottoman Empire's Place in World History". In Karpat, Kemal H. (ed.). The Ottoman State and Its Place in World History. Social, Economic and Political Studies of the Middle East. Vol. 11. Leiden: Brill Publishers. ISBN 978-90-04-03945-2. OCLC 1318483.
- Uğur, Ali (2007). Mavi Emperyalizm [Blue Imperialism] (in Turkish). Istanbul: Çatı Publishing. ISBN 978-975-8845-87-3. OCLC 221203375.
- von Hammer, Joseph. Osmanlı Tarihi cilt I. condensed by Abdülkadir Karahan. Istanbul: Milliyet yayınları.
