= Kryezi, Shkodër =

Kryezi
- Village
- Location within Albania
- Coordinates: 42°6′28″N 20°3′6″E
- Country: Albania
- County: Shkodër
- Municipality: Fushë-Arrëz
- Administrative unit: Qafë-Mali
- Time zone: UTC+1 (CET)
  - Summer (DST): UTC+2 (CEST)

Kryezi (Albanian: [kɾyɛˈzi]; Albanian definite form: Kryeziu) is a village in the former municipality of Qafë-Mali in Shkodër County, Albania. At the 2015 local government reform it became part of the municipality Fushë-Arrëz.

In 2018, it was chosen in the "100 Villages" project from the Albanian Ministry of Agriculture and Rural Development.

== Etymology ==
The name, broken down literally as "krye" (head) + "(i) zi" (black), means "black-haired". It is found as a toponym elsewhere in Tirana and Durrës.

== History ==
Kryezi is one of the traditional settlements of the Kabashi tribe.

The village might've been the birthplace of Safiye Sultan, Haseki Sultan and later Valide Sultan of the Ottoman Empire, who is described by Venetian sources as being from the village of "Rezi" (possible corruption of Kryezi) in the Dukagjin Highlands.

== Notable people ==
- Safiye Sultan - favorite concubine of Murad III, mother of Mehmed III and prominent figure of the Sultanate of Women
