= Sineperver Sultan =

Valide Sultan of Ottoman Empire

- Valide sultan

Valide sultan of the Ottoman Empire
- Tenure: 29 May 1807 – 28 July 1808
- Predecessor: Mihrişah Sultan
- Successor: Nakşidil Sultan
- Born: c. 1760
- Died: 11 December 1828 (aged 67–68); Constantinople, Ottoman Empire (present-day Istanbul, Turkey)
- Burial: Eyüp Sultan Mosque, Eyüp, Istanbul
- Consort: Abdul Hamid I
- Issue: Şehzade Ahmed; Esma Sultan; Mustafa IV; Fatma Sultan
Names
- Turkish: Ayşe Sineperver Sultan; Ottoman Turkish: عایشه سینه پرور سلطان
- Religion: Sunni Islam

Ayşe Sineperver Sultan (Ottoman Turkish: عایشه سینه پرور سلطان; c.1760 – 11 December 1828), also known as Ayşe Sineperver Kadın, was a consort of Ottoman Sultan Abdul Hamid I, and Valide Sultan to their son Sultan Mustafa IV of the Ottoman Empire.

== As imperial consort ==
Her origins are unknown. A victim of the Ottoman slave trade, Sineperver entered in the Abdul Hamid's Ottoman imperial harem as a slave concubine in 1774 and was given the title of "Fourth Consort". In 1775, she was elevated to "Third Consort". On 8 December 1776, she gave birth to her first child, a son, Şehzade Ahmed, who died at the age of about two on 18 November 1778.

In 1778, she was elevated to "Second Consort". On 17 July 1778, she gave birth to her second child, a daughter, Esma Sultan. One year later, on 8 September 1779, she gave birth to her third child, a son, Şehzade Mustafa (future Mustafa IV). Afraid that he would become sick and die like her elder son, Ahmed, she called upon her Kethüda for prayers for him after his birth. She also ordered the prisoners, who were imprisoned due to a failure to repay their debts, to be released and their debts to be paid.

In 1780, she commissioned a fountain in Üsküdar near the Cedid Valide Mosque in memory of her son, Ahmed.

Two years later, on 12 December 1782, she gave birth to her third child, a daughter, Fatma Sultan, who died of smallpox at the age of three on 11 January 1786. Sineperver was widowed at Abdul Hamid's death in 1789, after which she settled in the Old Palace.

== Valide Sultan and last years ==
After the accession of her son after the deposition of Sultan Selim III on 29 May 1807, Sineperver became the Valide Sultan. Yusuf Agha, who had been a kethüda of Selim's mother Mihrişah Sultan was an intimate of Selim. He was persuaded and finally killed by the machinations of Kabakçı Mustafa in the uprising against Selim in 1808, after which his tax farm was given to Sineperver.

After reigning as the sultan for fourteen months, Mustafa was deposed as a result of an insurrection led by Alemdar Mustafa Pasha on 28 July 1808. He was later executed by order of the next Sultan Mahmud II. After his death, she retired, and devoted herself to her daughter, Esma Sultan. She apparently fell on hard times, for she wrote Sultan Mahmud a letter in which she asked him for a house to live in.

In 1810, she commissioned a school and a fountain near Adapazarı. In order to meet the expenses, she also allocated some of her revenues to theses endowments, which came from shops and farms. These were later increased in 1814. In 1825, she commissioned a fountain in Istanbul between Hirka-i Serif and Karagümrük.

She lived more than twenty years after the execution of her son, and died on 11 December 1828 in Istanbul. Her burial place is located at The Fountain (Şadırvan) Courtyard of Eyüp Sultan Mosque in Eyüp, Istanbul. Her daughter outlived her by twenty years, dying in 1848.

== Issue ==
Together with Abdul Hamid, Sineperver had four children, two sons and two daughters:

- Şehzade Ahmed (8 December 1776 – 18 November 1778, buried in Tomb of Abdul Hamid I);
- Esma Sultan (17 July 1778 – 4 June 1848, buried in Tomb of Mahmud II), married 29 May 1792, Damat Küçük Hüseyin Pasha (died 8 January 1803), foster-brother of Sultan Selim III;
- Mustafa IV (8 September 1779 – 16 November 1808, buried in Tomb of Abdul Hamid I), Sultan of the Ottoman Empire from 1807 to 1808;
- Fatma Sultan (12 December 1782 – 11 January 1786, buried in Tomb of Abdul Hamid I);

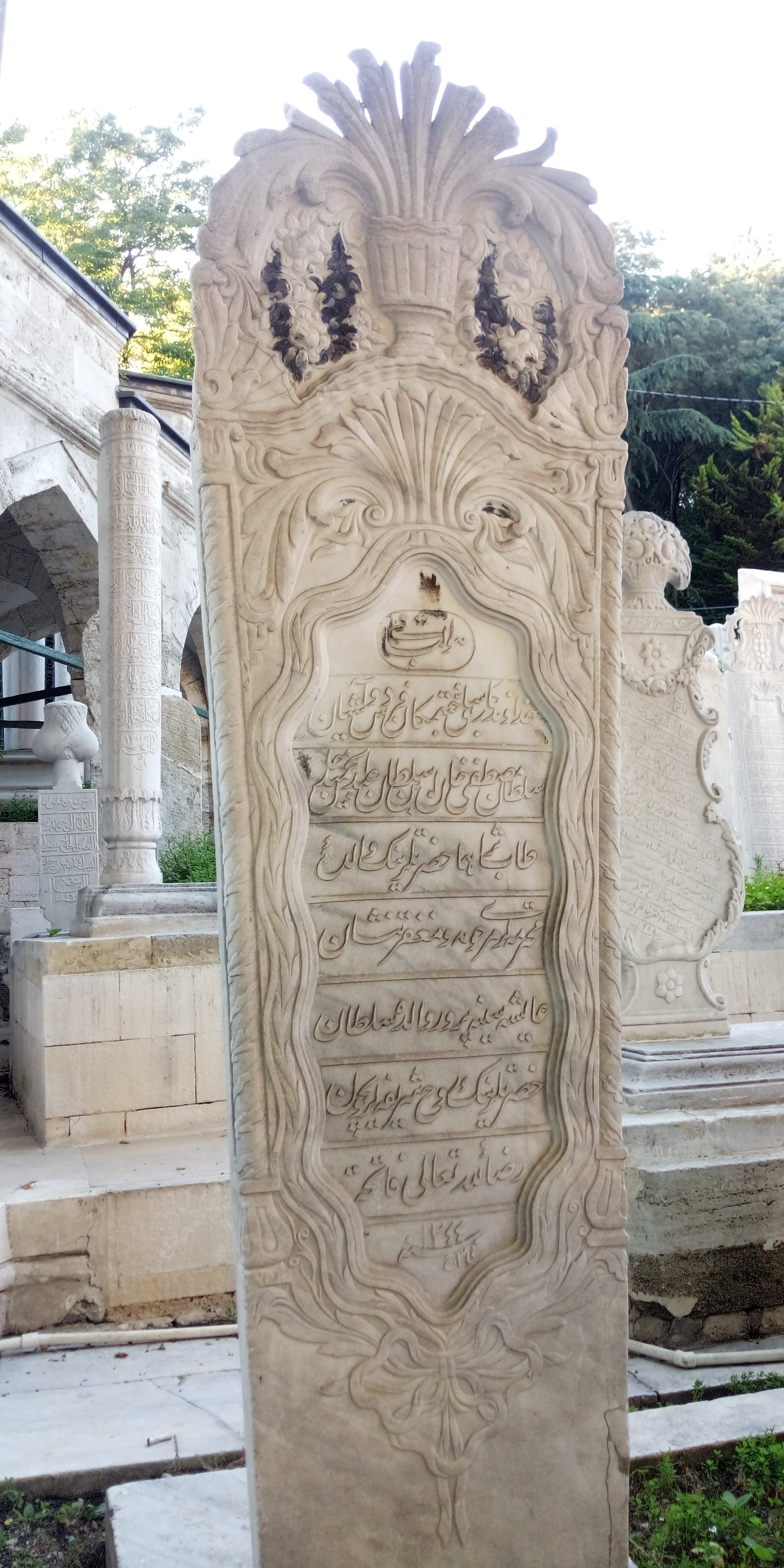
Tombstone of Ayşe Sineperver Sultan located in the Eyüpsultan Mosque cemetery in Istanbul

== In popular culture ==
- "Sultana" by Prince Michael of Greece (NY: Harper & Row, 1983), ISBN 0-06-015166-8
- In 1989, Swiss-American drama film The Favorite, Sineperver is portrayed by Swedish actress Maud Adams.
- In 2018, Turkish historical fiction TV series Kalbimin Sultanı, Sineperver is portrayed by Turkish actress Itır Esen.

== See also ==
- Ottoman Imperial Harem
- List of consorts of the Ottoman sultans
- Ottoman family tree

== Sources ==
- Uluçay, M. Çağatay (2011). Padişahların kadınları ve kızları. Ötüken. ISBN 978-9-754-37840-5.
- Duran, Türkan (2007). I. Abdülhamid'in Kızı Esma Sultan'ın Hayatı (1778–1848).
- Haskan, Mehmet Nermi (January 1, 2018). Hamîd-i Evvel Külliyesi ve Çevresi. Istanbul Ticaret Borsasi. ISBN 978-6-051-37663-9.

Ottoman royalty
Preceded by Mihrişah Sultan	Valide Sultan; 29 May 1807 – 28 July 1808	Succeeded by Nakşidil Sultan
