= Esma Sultan (daughter of Abdul Hamid I) =

Ottoman princess, daughter of Abdul Hamid I and Sineperver Sultan

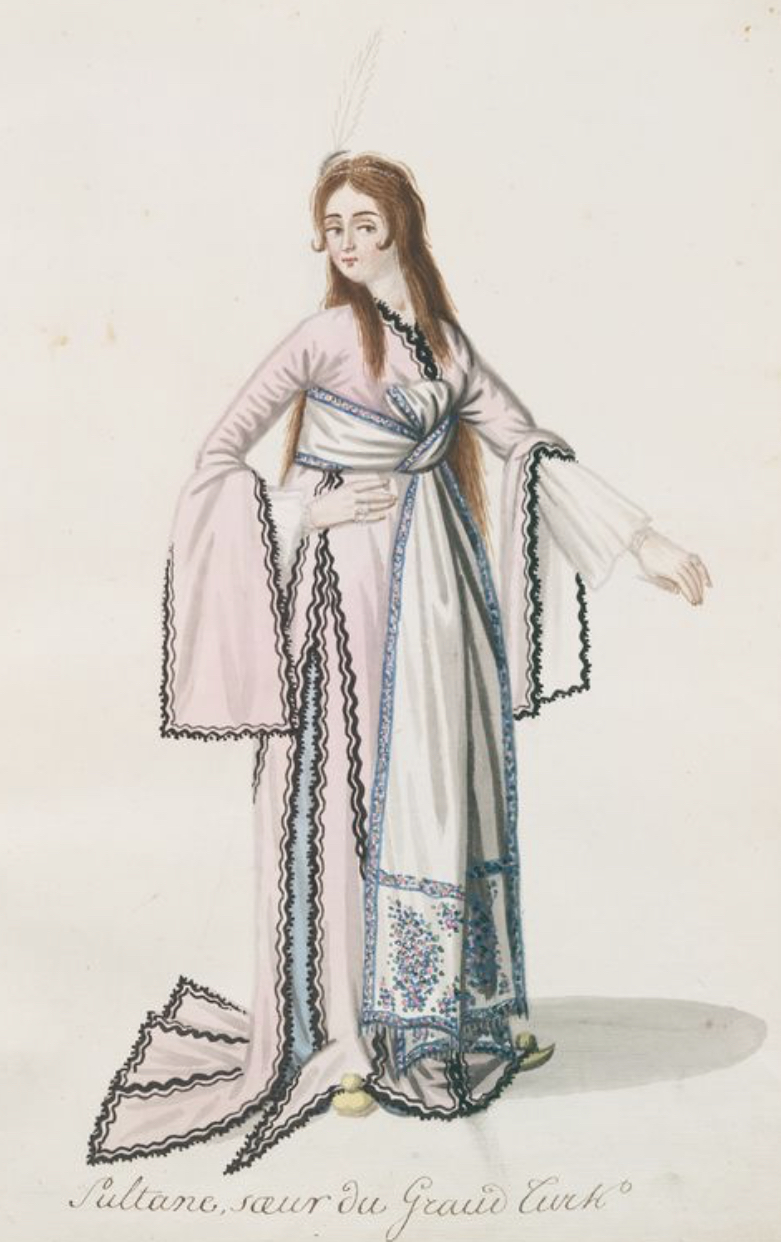
- Born: 17 July 1778; Topkapı Palace, Constantinople, Ottoman Empire
- Died: 4 June 1848 (aged 69); Constantinople, Ottoman Empire
- Burial: Mahmud II Mausoleum, Divanyolu, Istanbul
- Spouse: Küçük Hüseyin Pasha (m. 1792; died 1803)
- Issue: Adopted; Perestu Kadın; Nazif Hanım
- Dynasty: Ottoman
- Father: Abdul Hamid I
- Mother: Sineperver Sultan
- Religion: Sunni Islam

Esma Sultan (Ottoman Turkish: اسما سلطان; 17 July 1778 – 4 June 1848), also called Küçük Esma, (Esma "the younger"), was an Ottoman princess, daughter of Sultan Abdul Hamid I and Sineperver Sultan. She was the full-sister of Sultan Mustafa IV and half-sister of Sultan Mahmud II.

== Early life ==
Esma Sultan was born on 17 July 1778 in the Topkapı Palace. Her father was Abdul Hamid I and her mother was Sineperver Sultan. She had an elder brother Şehzade Ahmed, two years older than her, a younger brother Mustafa IV, one year younger than her, and a younger sister Fatma Sultan, four years younger than her. She was nicknamed Küçük Esma (Esma the younger) to distinguish her from her aunt Büyük Esma (Esma the eldest), whom she was named after.

In 1785, when she was seven years old, she had officially memorised the Quran, and her father celebrated the special occasion. In 1789, when she was eleven years old, her father died and she and her mother were sent to the old palace. Since Mustafa was only ten years old at the time of his father's death. Şehzade Selim ascended to the throne as Selim III as he was the eldest male member of the Ottoman Empire.

Esma Sultan spent her time in her childhood by reading books, playing musical instruments and games; her mother, Sineperver, was most likely to manage these entertainments in her apartment.

== Marriage ==
In 1792, when Esma was fourteen, her cousin Selim III arranged her marriage to Küçük Hüseyin Pasha, who was captain of the seas. Hüseyin Pasha was born in 1758, and was of Georgian origin, he was presented to the palace by Silahtar Ibrahim Pasha, and has taken his education from Enderûn, he entered in the service of Şehzade Mehmed, the half-brother of Sultan Selim that died in infancy, as Lala (tutor). On 10 March 1792, he rose to the rank of Kapudan Pasha.

The engagement took place on 29 May 1792. The wedding processions were held in Istanbul, the deputy of Esma Sultan was Darussade Agha. Following the engagement, a major disturbance took place in the Aegean Islands, Hüseyin Pasha left Istanbul and the wedding as a result was postponed, Hüseyin Pasha returned to Istanbul on 29 September 1792. Three months later on 19 December 1792, the wedding of Esma Sultan and Hüseyin Pasha took place. The next day she was transferred to Yeşil Palace at Divanyolu, which had been allocated to her.

Valuable gifts were also sent by Mihrişah Sultan at the wedding of Esma Sultan. The gifts of the Valide Sultan were as follows: one medium-sized and 706 small rose diamonds and a chandelier decorated with red rubies and diamonds; For the palace of the sultan's house in Divanyolu, 18 pieces of Austrian footbed pillows, 3 pieces of Polish-made striped and fringed, solid wire upper mat cushion, 3 pieces of mattress.

Esma and her husband were socially active and used to organise parties in their palaces, these events caused various rumours to spread around the capital, it is said that Esma had fondness for bright eyed young men. Esma was said to be very social, well versed and beautiful.

In 1797, Hüseyin Pasha was sent to Vidin to execute Pasvantoğlu Osman, who had rebelled against Selim. Following that, he besieged the Vidin Castle, due to lack of soldiers and intense cold, resentment grew against Hüseyin and other statesmen, and Pasvantoğlu was pardoned. On 2 July 1798, Napoleon Bonaparte landed in Egypt in order to take over during the French campaign in Egypt and Syria, Hüseyin Pasha and the navy sailed to the Mediterranean, and on 27 June 1801, the Ottomans decisively defeated the French with the help of the British Navy and signed the peace treaty with France. Esma Sultan was delighted to hear the success of the Pasha of liberating Egypt from the French. Hüseyin Pasha died on 8 December 1803 and was buried in Mihrişah Sultan Mausoleum at Eyüp. Like the princesses of her generation, she never remarried.

== Widowhood ==
=== Lifestyle ===
Esma Sultan was widowed at the young age of twenty five, she is notable for her lifestyle and fashion. Even after being widowed, she continued her worldly lifestyle. Mahmud's favour granted her a degree of freedom never before granted to a princess.

She was the center of Istanbul's social life and continually inspired new fashions. Each evening she offered concerts in his palace, which could also be heard from boats on the Bosphorus. One of the sons of French king Louis-Philippe I and Maria Amalia of Naples and Sicily, on a visit, was fascinated by the princess. Her parties were known for the constant presence of young and beautiful boys, and for the behaviour that was inappropriate for the time. Although the Sultan occasionally had some of her dancers or servants executed, he loved his sister too much to impose any limits on her.

Admirer of European fashion, she promoted it among the women of the Ottoman elite, who imitated her clothes and jewels, and forced everyone in her palace to dress European. However, Julia Pardoe, an English writer who was her guest, implied that, even if Esma and her maids did not realize it, their concept of "European style" was rather caricatured in relation to reality. In addition to the clothes, she remodeled his palaces to be decorated and furnished in English styles.

She is known for her trips in the country with her concubines. She was also known for her attraction to young men, it was said that her men would roam around the city and find young men, and they would tie the feet and hand of these men and bring them to Esma's palace. After spending a night with them, the next day, she would order the young men to be poisoned, and after that they were secretly buried.

=== Adoptive children ===
She lived with luxury in her magnificent villa in Istanbul, but still her life passed in sadness because she could not have the one thing she wished for most; a child. At length she decided to adopt a child. After reaching satisfactory terms with the mother and father, she adopted Rahime Perestu, one year of age.

Rahime was particularly diminutive, delicate and graceful, so she renamed her Perestu, the Persian word for swallow. All the kalfas in Esma Sultan's villa behaved toward this child as though she were a daughter of an Ottoman imperial princess, and indeed her disposition and manners were so lovely that they became devoted to her. In 1844, her nephew Abdulmejid I asked in hand for the marriage for Perestu, firstly, she refused to give Perestu's hand in marriage but consented on the condition that the Sultan legally marries her and not consider her a concubine, which he did. One week after that, Perestu was sent off to Topkapı Palace to the harem. She also had adopted Nazif Hanım, whose mother died when she was still a child, she was raised excellently in her household.

In addition to these, was also educated in the house of Esma the future Bezmiâlem Sultan, who became one of the consort of Esma's half-brother, Mahmud II and the mother of Abdulmejid I, Zernigar Kadın and Hüsnimelek Hanım, who also became the consorts of Mahmud II, and some Abdülmejid's consorts, as Servetseza Kadın and Tirimüjgan Kadın. However, these were not considered daughters, but only girls who were brought up for the harem by noble Ottoman women as was the custom.

== Political influence ==
Unlike other princesses, Esma was politically active. Along with her mother, she played a vital role in Kabakçı revolt, which had the aim of overthrowing Selim from the throne. Following the overthrowing of Selim III, her brother Mustafa IV, succeeded to the throne.

She is said to have played a vital role in the murder of Selim III, following his murder, her brother was overthrown from the throne by her half brother Mahmud II and Alemdar Mustafa Pasha. In response, she planned a mutinous rebellion during the reign of Mahmud to restore her brother Mustafa IV to the throne. She personally had sent letters to Janissaries for restoring Mustafa back to the throne and met them personally. Mahmud who knew about her political activities, didn't intervene in the affairs as he loved her like his own sister. Alemdar Pasha committed suicide on 15 November 1808.

On the eve of Mustafa's execution on 16 November 1808, the Janissaries gathered in front of Mahmud's palace and threatened to have him dethroned and place Esma Sultan on the throne. Following these events, she and her half-sister Hibetullah Sultan were kept under close surveillance by Mahmud, and they both were forbade to have communications with the outsiders.

Following these events, Mahmud and Esma relations with each other improved rather than deteriorating. She exercised great influence over her brother Mahmud during his reign of 31 years; she became his chief advisor and was consulted regularly on state matters. Mahmud loved his sister very much and she also esteemed him. They always visited each other at their palaces. She became the empire's affluent woman at that time. She was the owner of Eyüp Palace, Maçka Palace and Tirnakçı Palace. She also owned several lands to in Crete, Kemer, Edremit and Biga. Esma Sultan enjoyed a delightful life in her coastal palace known as "Hançerli Sultan Mansion" and in her mansion at Ortaköy, which belonged to her aunt Esma Sultan "the Elder".

== Properties and charities ==
Esma Sultan, bought many farms around Istanbul, built palaces in Eyüp, Maçka, and Tirnakçı and Kuruçeşme mansions in Boğaziçi. Thanks to the high position of her husband, she had important influence over Ottoman society. She owned a palace in Divanyolu, kiosks in Çamlıca, Maçka and Eyüp and a waterfront mansion in Kuruçeşme at Bosporus. In 1830, her nephew Abdulaziz was born in her palace. She was a pioneer of provoking to fellow western fashion among her family. Her famous palace known as the "Esma Sultan Mansion" had been given to her grand-niece Esma Sultan, daughter of her nephew Abdulaziz, when she married Kabaskal Mehmed Pasha. She commissioned a fountain in Çamlıca.

As the guest of Esma Sultan, Miss Julia Pardoe, who went to Tirnakçı, gave detailed information about the mansion. Miss Pardoe described the mansion as follows: After the waiting hall leading up the stairs, after passing several rooms and a hall with twelve windows on one side overlooking the Bosphorus and on the mansion gardens, the harem apartment was coming.

Esma Sultan was interested in British culture; she was said to have furnished her palace with Western furniture, putting all of the traditional Ottoman furniture in a storage room. After her death, all of her English furniture was put away in the same storage room and the old oriental ones taken out once again. Mahmud died in her palace on 1 July 1839.

== Death ==
Esma Sultan died on 4 June 1848, during the reign of her nephew Sultan Abdulmejid I, at the age of sixty nine. She was buried in the mausoleum of her brother Mahmud in Divanyolu, and was the last surviving child of Abdul Hamid I.

Following her death, her properties and wealth were bequeathed to her niece Adile Sultan, and later her daughter Hayriye Hanımsultan.

== In popular culture ==
- In 2018 Turkish historical fiction TV series Kalbimin Sultanı, Esma is portrayed by Turkish actress Emel Çölgeçen.

== See also ==
- List of Ottoman princesses

== Sources ==
- Brookes, Douglas Scott (2010). The Concubine, the Princess, and the Teacher: Voices from the Ottoman Harem. University of Texas Press. ISBN 978-0-292-78335-5.
- Duran, Türkan (2007). I. Abdülhamid'in Kızı Esma Sultan'ın Hayatı (1778–1848).
- Sakaoğlu, Necdet (2008). Bu mülkün kadın sultanları: Vâlide sultanlar, hâtunlar, hasekiler, kadınefendiler, sultanefendiler. Oğlak Yayıncılık. ISBN 978-9-753-29623-6.
- Uluçay, Mustafa Çağatay (2011). Padişahların kadınları ve kızları. Ankara: Ötüken. ISBN 978-9-754-37840-5.
