= Valide sultan =

Title used for the mother of an Ottoman sultan

Valide Sultan of the Ottoman Empire
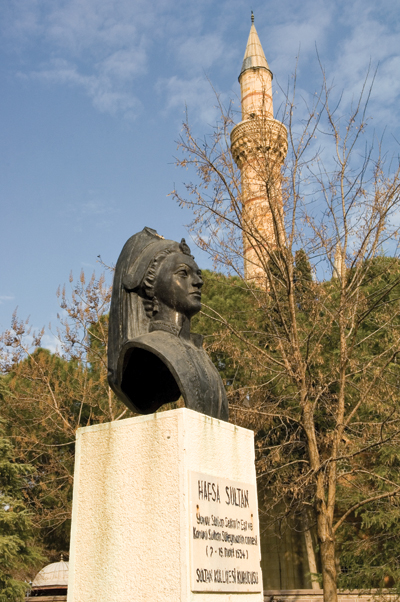
- A bust of the first valide sultan, Hafsa Sultan, in Manisa, Turkey
- Residence: Topkapı Palace; Dolmabahçe Palace; Yıldız Palace
- Formation: 30 September 1520
- First holder: Hafsa Sultan
- Final holder: Rahime Perestu Sultan
- Abolished: 1 November 1922

Valide Sultan (Ottoman Turkish: والده سلطان, lit. "Sultana Mother") was the title held by the mother of a ruling sultan of the Ottoman Empire. The title was supposedly created by Suleiman the Magnificent in the 16th century for his mother Hafsa Sultan, superseding the previous epithets of mehd-i ulya ("cradle of the great"). Normally, the living mother of a ruling sultan held this title; mothers who died before their sons' accession to the throne never received it. In special cases, there were grandmothers, stepmothers, adoptive mothers of the ruling sultans who, although not officially holding the title, assumed the role of valide sultan like

== Term ==
The word valide (والده) literally means 'mother' in Ottoman Turkish, from Arabic wālida. The Turkish pronunciation of the word valide is [vaː.liˈde].

Sultan (سلطان, sulṭān) is an Arabic word originally meaning 'authority' or 'dominion'. By the beginning of the 16th century, this title, carried by both men and women of the Ottoman dynasty, was replacing other titles by which prominent members of the imperial family had been known (notably hatun for women and bey for men). This usage underlines the Ottoman conception of sovereign power as family prerogative. Consequently, the title valide hatun (title for living mother of reigning Ottoman sultan before 16th century) also turned into valide sultan. This usage underlines the Ottoman conception of sovereign power as family prerogative.

Western tradition knows the Ottoman ruler as sultan, but the Ottomans themselves used padişah (emperor) or hünkar to refer to their ruler. The emperor's formal title consisted of sultan together with khan (for example, Sultan Suleiman Khan). In formal address, the sultan's children were also entitled sultan, with imperial princes (şehzade) carrying the title before their given name, with imperial princesses carrying it after. For example, Şehzade Sultan Mehmed and Mihrimah Sultan were the son and daughter of Suleiman the Magnificent. Like imperial princesses, the living mother and main consort of reigning sultans also carried the title after their given names, for example, Hafsa Sultan, Suleiman's mother and first valide sultan, and Hürrem Sultan, Suleiman's chief consort and first haseki sultan. The evolving usage of this title reflected power shifts among imperial women, especially between the Sultanate of Women, as the position of main consort eroded over the course of 17th century, the main consort lost the title sultan, which replaced by kadïn, a title related to the earlier khatun. Henceforth, the mother of the reigning sultan was the only person of non-imperial blood to carry the title sultan.

== Role and position ==
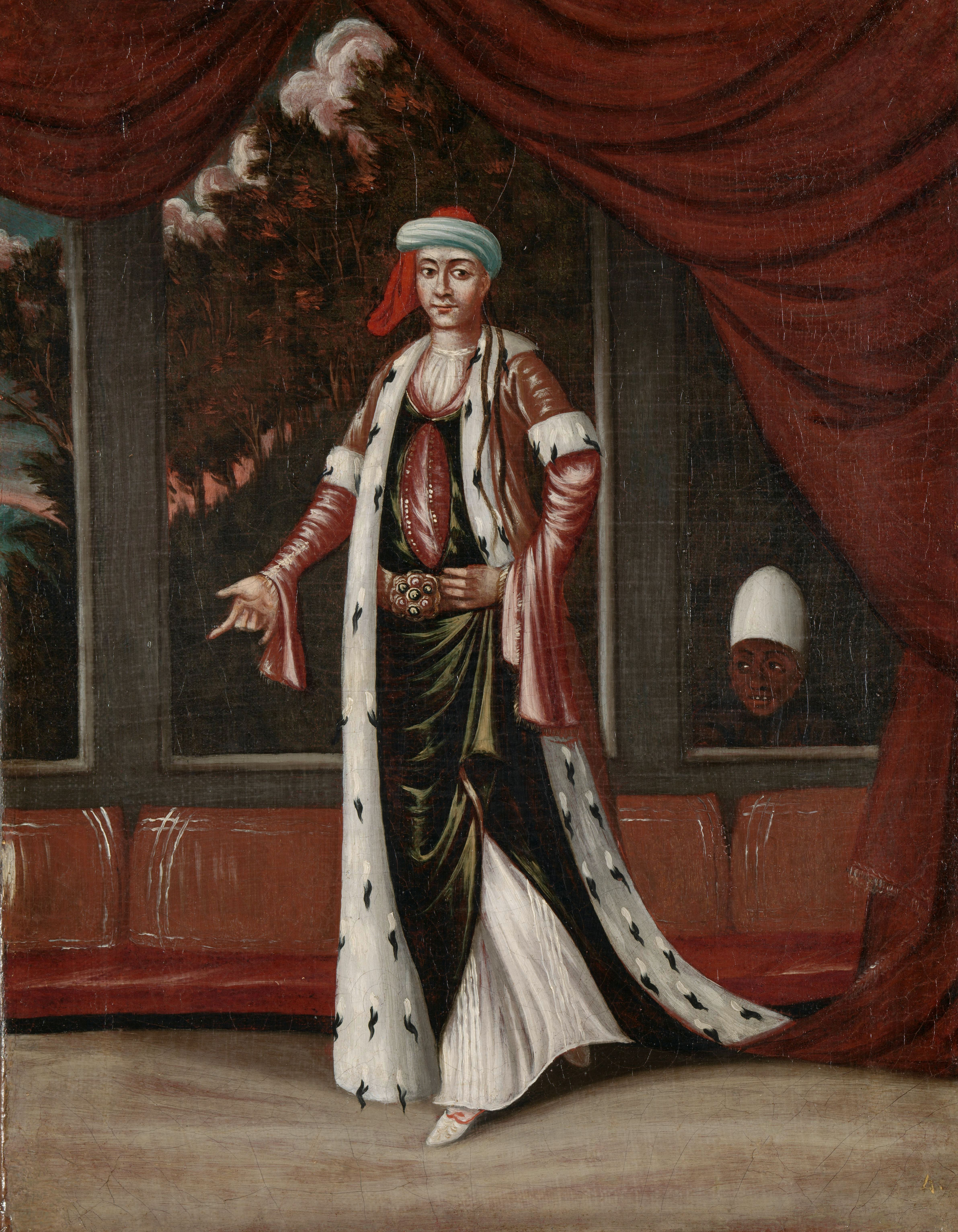
Painting of a Valide Sultan (Saliha Sultan), c. 1730 by Jean Baptiste Vanmour.

Valide sultan was, in most cases, the most important position in the Ottoman Empire after the sultan himself. As the mother to the sultan, by Islamic tradition ("A mother's right is God's right"), the valide sultan would often have a significant influence on the affairs of the empire. She had great power in the court and her own rooms (always adjacent to her son's) and state staff. The valide sultan had quarters within the New Palace, where the Sultan himself resided, beginning in the 16th century.

As the Valide Sultan (Sultana mother), who had direct and intimate access to the Sultan's person, often influenced government decisions bypassing the Imperial Council and the Grand Vizier altogether or the grille-covered window from which the Sultan or Valide Sultan could observe Council meetings. This left her at the heart of the political ongoings and machinations of the Ottoman Empire. Valide Sultan also traditionally had access to considerable economic resources and often funded major architectural projects, such as the Atik Valide Mosque Complex in Istanbul. Many Valide Sultans undertook massive philanthropic endeavors and buildings, as this was seen as one of the main ways to demonstrate influence and wealth. Valide Sultans were also conveniently one of the few people within the empire with the status and means to embark on these expensive projects. Nurbanu Sultan's daily stipend as Valide Sultan to her son, Murad III, was 2000 aspers, an extraordinary sum for the time, which revealed the highly influential position she held at court.

The valide sultan also maintained special privileges that other harem members could not. A valide sultan had mobility outside of the harem, sometimes through ceremonial visibility to the public or veiled meetings with government officials and diplomats. Additionally, the valide sultan led a crucial elements of diplomacy within the empire’s court: marriages of royal princesses. The most powerful and influential valide sultans forged crucial alliances through the marriages of their daughters. During the 17th century, in a period known as the Sultanate of Women, a series of incompetent or child sultans raised the role of the valide sultan to new heights. Two Valide sultans acted as regents for their sons, assuming the vast power and influence the position entailed.

The most powerful and well-known of all Valide Sultans in the history of the Ottoman Empire were Kösem Sultan, Turhan Sultan, Safiye Sultan and Nurbanu Sultan.

Nurbanu Sultan became the first of the great Valide Sultans during the 16th century, as Haseki Sultan as well as legal wife to Sultan Selim II. Nurbanu’s influential career as Valide Sultan established the precedent of Valide Sultan maintaining more power than her nearest harem rival, the Haseki Sultan, or favorite concubine of the reigning Sultan. The following influential Valide Sultans, Kösem Sultan, Turhan Sultan and Safiye Sultan, maintained this precedent and occupied positions of great power within the Ottoman imperial court. These positions, as well as helping them solidify their own power within the imperial court, also eased diplomatic tensions internationally.

Most harem women who were slaves were never formally married to the Sultans. Nevertheless, their children were considered fully legitimate under Islamic law if recognized by the father.

== List of Valide Hatuns ==
The list does not include the complete list of mothers of the Ottoman sultans. Ayşe Gülbahar Hatun, who died before her son's accession to throne, never assumed the title of Valide Hatun.

Name	Birth name	Origin	Consort of	Became valide	Ceased to be valide	Death	Sultan
Nilüfer Hatun نیلوفر خاتون	unknown	Byzantine Greek	Orhan	March 1362 son's ascension	1363		Murad I (son)
Gülçiçek Hatun كلچیچك خاتون	unknown	Byzantine Greek	Murad I	16 June 1389 son's ascension	c. 1400		Bayezid I (son)
Devlet Hatun دولت خاتون	unknown	unknown	Bayezid I	5 July 1413 son's ascension	26 May 1421 son's death	1422	Mehmed I (son)
Emine Hatun امینہ خاتون	Emine	Turkish	Mehmed I	26 May 1421 son's ascension	August 1444 son's abdication		Murad II (son)
Emine Hatun امینہ خاتون	Emine	Turkish	Mehmed I	September 1446 son's reinstatement	1449		Murad II (son)
Hüma Hatun هما خاتون	unknown	disputed	Murad II	August 1444 son's first ascension	September 1446		Mehmed II (son)
Gülbahar Hatun گل بھار مکرمه خاتون	unknown	Albanian, Greek or Serbian	Mehmed II	3 May 1481 son's ascension	1492		Bayezid II (son)

== List of Valide Sultans ==
The list does not include the complete list of mothers of the Ottoman sultans. Most who held the title of Valide Sultan were the biological mothers of the reigning sultans. The mothers who died before their sons' accession to throne, never assumed the title of Valide Sultan, like Hürrem Sultan, Mahfiruz Hatun, Muazzez Sultan, Mihrişah Kadın, Şermi Kadın, Tirimüjgan Kadın, Gülcemal Kadın and Gülistu Kadın. In special cases, there were grandmothers, stepmothers and adoptive mothers of the reigning sultans who, although not officially holding the title, assumed the role like Rahime Perestu Sultan.

Appearance	Name	Maiden name	Origin	Became valide	Ceased to be valide	Death	Sultan(s)
	Ayşe Hafsa Sultan حفصه سلطان	unknown	Unknown	30 September 1520 son's ascension	19 March 1534		Suleiman the Magnificent (son)
	Afife Nurbanu Sultan نور بانو سلطان	Cecilia Venier-Baffo or Kalē Kartanou or Rachel	Venetian or Greek or Jewish	15 December 1574 son's ascension	7 December 1583		Murad III (son)
	Safiye Sultan صفیه سلطان		Albanianor Venetian	15 January 1595 son's ascension	22 December 1603 son's death	January/April 1619	Mehmed III (son)
	Handan Sultan خندان سلطان	unknown	Bosnian or Greek	22 December 1603 son's ascension	9 November 1605		Ahmed I (son)
	Halime Sultan حلیمه سلطان	unknown	Abkhaz	22 November 1617 son's ascension (first tenure); 19 May 1622 son’s second ascension	26 February 1618 son's first deposition (first tenure); 10 September 1623 son’s second deposition (second tenure)	after 1623	Mustafa I (son)
	Mahfiruz Hatice Sultan خدیجه ماه فیروز سلطان	Unknown	Unknown	26 February 1618 (disputed)	26/28 October 1620 or 20 May 1622 (disputed)	1608 or 1628	Osman II (son)
	Mahpeyker Kösem Sultan ماه پیکر كوسم سلطان	Anastasía (?)	Greek or Bosnian	10 September 1623 son's ascension	8 August 1648 son's deposition	2 September 1651	Murad IV (son); Ibrahim (son)
	Hatice Turhan Sultan ترخان خدیجه سلطان		Russian, Circassian or Ukrainian	8 August 1648 son's ascension	4 August 1683		Mehmed IV (son)
	Saliha Dilaşub Sultan صالحه دل آشوب سلطان	unknown	unknown	8 November 1687 son's ascension	4 December 1689		Suleiman II (son)
	Emetullah Rabia Gülnuş Sultan رابعه گلنوش سلطان	Evmania Voria Verzini	Greek or Venetian from the island of Crete	6 February 1695 son's ascension	6 November 1715		Mustafa II (son); Ahmed III (son)
	Sebkati Saliha Sultan صالحه سلطان	unknown	unknown,	20 September 1730 son's ascension	21 September 1739		Mahmud I (son)
	Şehsuvar Sultan شهسوار سلطان	unknown	Unkown, Russian	13 December 1754 son's ascension	27 April 1756		Osman III (son)
	Mihrişah Sultan مهر شاه سلطان		Georgian or/ and Genoese	7 April 1789 son's ascension	16 October 1805		Selim III (son)
	Ayşe Sineperver Sultan سینه پرور سلطان	unknown	Bulgarian, Circassian or Georgian	29 May 1807 son's ascension	28 July 1808 son's deposition	11 December 1828	Mustafa IV (son)
	Nakşidil Sultan نقش دل سلطان	unknown	Georgian or Circassian	28 July 1808 son's ascension	22 August 1817		Mahmud II (son)
	Bezmiâlem Sultan بزم عالم سلطان	unknown	Georgian or Circassian	2 July 1839 son's ascension	2 May 1853		Abdülmecid I (son)
	Pertevniyal Sultan پرتو نهال سلطان	Besime	Kurd, Romanian or Circassian	25 June 1861 son's ascension	30 May 1876 son's deposition	5 February 1883	Abdülaziz I (son)
	Şevkefza Sultan شوق افزا سلطان		Mingrelian and Circassian	30 May 1876 son's ascension	31 August 1876 son's deposition	17 September 1889	Murad V (son)
	Rahime Perestu Sultan رحيمه پرستو سلطان	Rahime Hanim	Ubykh adoptive daughter of Esma Sultan	31 August 1876 step-son's ascension	11 December 1904		Abdul Hamid II (adoptive son)

== Büyük Valide Sultan ==
The title of Büyük Valide Sultan (Senior Valide Sultan) or Büyükanne Sultan (Grandmother Sultana) was created by Kösem Sultan and officially used only by her during the reign of her grandson Mehmed IV, thus limiting the power of Turhan Sultan who was deemed too young to fulfill the title of Valide Sultan.

Appearance	Name	Maiden name	Note	Became Büyük valide	Ceased to be Büyük valide	Death	Sultan(s)
	Büyük Valide Mahpeyker Kösem Sultan ماه پیکر كوسم سلطان	Anastasía (?)	Following Mehmed IV's accession, she proclaimed herself as Büyük Valide Sultan	8 August 1648 – her death	2 September 1651		Mehmed IV (grandson)

== See also ==
- Hanımefendi
- Harem
- Haseki Sultan
- Kadınefendi
- List of mothers of the Ottoman sultans
- List of Ottoman titles and appellations
- Ottoman family tree
- Seraglio
- Sultana (title)

== Bibliography ==
- Akyıldız, Ali (2009). "Saliha Sultan" (PDF). Islam Ansiklopedisi. Vol. 36. Istanbul: İslâm Araştırmaları Merkezi. p. 45.
- Arbel, Benjamin (1992). "Nur Banu (c. 1530-1583): A Venetian Sultana?". Turcica (24): 241–259.
- Baer, Marc David (2011). Honored by the Glory of Islam: Conversion and Conquest in Ottoman Europe. Oxford University Press. ISBN 9780199797837.
- Carsten, F. L. (1961). The New Cambridge Modern History. Vol. V. The Ascendancy of France, 1648–88. Cambridge University Press. pp. 505–506. ISBN 9780521045445.
- Cooke, Miriam; Göknar, Erdağ M.; Parker, Grant Richard (2008). Mediterranean passages: readings from Dido to Derrida. University of North Carolina Press. ISBN 9780807831830.
- Davis, Fanny (1970). The Palace of Topkapi in Istanbul. Scribner. OCLC 636864790.
- İpşirli, Mehmet (1996). Gülnûş Emetullah Sultan (PDF). Vol. 14. İstanbul: İslâm Araştırmaları Merkezi. pp. 248–249.
- Karaca, Filiz (2012). "Turhan Sultan". Islam Ansiklopedisi (in Turkish). Vol. 41. İslâm Araştırmaları Merkezi. pp. 423–425.
- Peirce, Leslie P. (1993). The Imperial Harem: Women and Sovereignty in the Ottoman Empire. Oxford University Press. ISBN 978-0-19-508677-5.
- Somel, S. A. (2003). Historical Dictionary of the Ottoman Empire. The Scarecrow Press, imprint of Rowman & Littlefield. ISBN 0810866064.
- Sakaoğlu, Necdet (2008). Bu mülkün kadın sultanları: Vâlide sultanlar, hâtunlar, hasekiler, kadınefendiler, sultanefendiler. Oğlak Yayıncılık. ISBN 978-9753296236.
- Sakaoğlu, Necdet (2015). Bu mülkün kadın sultanları (in Turkish). İstanbul: ALFA Basım Yayım Dağıtım San. ve T ic. Ltd. Şti. pp. 279–291. ISBN 978-605-171-079-2.
- Uluçay, M. Çağatay (2011). Padişahların Kadınları ve Kızları (in Turkish). Is.: Ötüken. pp. 105–107. ISBN 978-9754378405.
