= Qafë-Mali =

- Administrative unit
- Interactive map of Qafë-Mali
- Location within Albania
- Coordinates: 42°5′24″N 20°5′29″E
- Country: Albania
- County: Shkodër
- Municipality: Fushë-Arrëz
  - Administrative unit: 143.13 km^{2} (55.26 sq mi)

Population (2011)
  - Administrative unit: 1,548
  - Administrative unit density: 10.82/km^{2} (28.01/sq mi)
- Time zone: UTC+1 (CET)
  - Summer (DST): UTC+2 (CEST)

Qafë-Mali is a village and a former municipality in the Shkodër County, northern Albania. At the 2015 local government reform it became a subdivision of the municipality Fushë-Arrëz. The population at the 2011 census was 1,548.

== Settlements ==
There are 9 settlements within Qafë-Mali:

1. Armiraj
2. Kryezi
3. Lajthizë
4. Lumbardhë
5. Mollkuqe
6. Orosh
7. Qafë-Mali
8. Srriqe
9. Tuç
