= Blerim =

- Administrative unit
- Location within Albania
- Coordinates: 42°11′N 20°9′E
- Country: Albania
- County: Shkodër
- Municipality: Fushë-Arrëz

Population (2011)
  - Administrative unit: 913
- Time zone: UTC+1 (CET)
  - Summer (DST): UTC+2 (CEST)

Blerim is a village and a former municipality in Shkodër County, northern Albania. At the 2015 local government reform it became a subdivision of the municipality Fushë-Arrëz. The population at the 2011 census was 913. It is part of the wider Pukë region.

== Settlements ==
The municipal unit of Blerim includes the following seven villages:

1. Flet
2. Xeth
3. Kulumri
4. Trun
5. Blerim
6. Dardhë
7. Qebik
