= Nakşidil Sultan =

Valide Sultan of the Ottoman Empire from 1808 to 1817

- Valide sultan
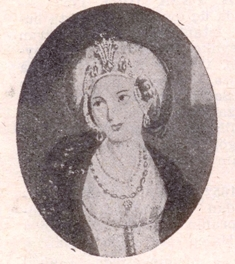
- Portrait in bust of Nakşidil Sultan, 18th Century

Valide Sultan of the Ottoman Empire
- Tenure: 28 July 1808 – 28 July 1817
- Predecessor: Sineperver Sultan
- Successor: Bezmiâlem Sultan
- Born: c. 1761; Georgia
- Died: 28 July 1817 (aged 55–56); Beşiktaş Palace, Constantinople, Ottoman Empire (present day Istanbul, Turkey)
- Burial: Türbe of Nakşidil Sultan, Fatih Mosque, Istanbul, Turkey
- Consort: Abdul Hamid I
- Issue: Şehzade Murad Seyfullah; Mahmud II; Saliha Sultan
Names
- Turkish: Nakşidil Sultan; Ottoman Turkish: نقش دل سلطان
- Religion: Sunni Islam, previously Georgian Orthodox

Nakşidil Sultan (Ottoman Turkish: نقش دل سلطان; also called Nakşi Sultan; c. 1761 – 28 July 1817) was a consort of Sultan Abdul Hamid I, and Valide Sultan to their son Mahmud II, Sultan of the Ottoman Empire.

== Background ==
=== Origins ===
According to various scholars, she came from a family with origins in the Caucasus region (via the Black Sea slave trade). Fikret Saraçoğlu has found in the archives of the Topkapı Palace in Istanbul documents pertaining to her death and funeral. Others like Necdet Sakaoğlu and Ibrahim Pazan traced these origins further and claim she was actually a Georgian. By custom the consorts of the Ottoman sultans were normally concubines of Christian origin, who came to the Ottoman Imperial harem via the Ottoman slave trade, converted to Islam and were given a slave name after their arrival. She was raised in the Ottoman palace and was given thoroughly Turkish Islamic education.

=== Controversy over identity ===
There is a fanciful legend that Nakşidil was Aimée du Buc de Rivéry, who had gone missing at sea in 1788, and was a distant cousin-in-law of the former Empress Josephine, wife of Napoleon Bonaparte. According to this myth, Aimée du Buc de Rivéry was captured by Barbary pirates and sold as a harem concubine, but modern historians have debunked this.

Several older myths, dating as far back as the early 16th century, claimed links between the French and Ottoman monarchies. These have turned out to be politically motivated fabrications designed to justify alliances between the two (supposedly related) monarchies. The Aimée-Nakşidil story has several clear parallels with these older stories. During the monarchy, stories of kidnapped French princesses weren't denied by French officials in order to maintain good relations with the Ottoman inventors of the stories. In later times, these and similar harem tales have been used in France to perpetuate a view of Turkey, the Middle East, and Islam in general as mysterious and despotic in nature, despite more accurate accounts.

However, fifty years later, in 1867, when Sultan Abdulaziz, son of Mahmud, went to Paris to be entertained by Napoleon III, he was greeted with great enthusiasm by Napoleon, who told the press that their grandmothers were related. Another invented tradition concerning a French woman with royal connections in the Ottoman harem was being created to support the political aspirations of the rulers of the Ottoman Empire and France. As in other examples of invented traditions, this legend was loosely connected with a historical phenomenon. Initially this legend also emphasized the relationship between the two rulers, just as the earlier myth had done.

== As imperial consort ==
Nakşidil, who had been a lady-in-waiting to Esma Sultan, daughter of Sultan Ahmed III, became one of the consorts to Abdul Hamid I in 1782. She was given the title of "Seventh Consort". On 22 October 1783, she gave birth to her first child, a son, Şehzade Murad Seyfullah, who died at the age of two of smallpox on 21 January 1785.

One year later, on 20 July 1785, she gave birth to her second child, a son, Şehzade Mahmud (future Sultan Mahmud II). One year later, on 27 November 1786, she gave birth to her third child, a daughter, Saliha Sultan, who died at the age of one on 10 April 1788.

In 1788, Nakşidil commissioned a fountain in Sultanahmet next to the prison known as the "Nakşi Kadın Fountain". She was widowed at Abdul Hamid's death in 1789.

== Widowhood and Valide Sultan ==
In 1807, after the accession of her stepson, Sultan Mustafa IV, her daily and weekly allocations were raised. During these years, the monthly and annual income sources of Nakşidil came from the three farms located in Taşçı Han, near the Fatih Mosque.

In 1808, assassins sent by his half-brother Mustafa, aided by the Ulema, sought to murder Mahmud. Nakşidil saved her son by concealing him, so that he lived to become the next sultan, Mahmud II. Mahmud became sultan after having ordered the death of his half-brother, Mustafa, who had previously ordered the deaths of Mahmud himself and of their cousin, Selim III, whom Mustafa had deposed as sultan, and Nakşidil became the Valide Sultan.

In 1809, she commissioned a fountain near Sarıkadı Village in Üsküdar known as "Nakşidil Sultan fountain". In 1817, she established another fountain, kitchen, and her own mausoleum in Fatih.

== Death and aftermath ==
In 1816, Nakşidil was struck by a severe illness. Two Greek doctors treated her but were unable to heal her. The chief physician advised Nakşidil to have some rest at the mansion of Gümrükçü Osman Ağa at Çamlıca, but the weather there affected her health, and so she returned to Beşiktaş Palace, where she died on the anniversary of her son's accession to the throne on 28 July 1817 of tuberculosis. She was buried in her own mausoleum located at Fatih, Istanbul.

The wife of a French ambassador was present in Istanbul at the time of Nakşidil's death writes in her diary, validating the contemporary rumors about the sultana's legendary French origins:

The Valide sultan is dead. . . . It is said that the deceased Sultane was French, of American origin, and that she was born in Nantes; it is added that at barely two years old, her parents embarked with her for America and they were captured by a corsair who took them to Algiers, where they perished. The little girl was purchased by a slave merchant, who judged by her beauty at such a tender age, that she would one day amply compensate him for the care that he lavished upon her. He was not mistaken in his expectation; at fourteen she was a dazzling beauty, sold to the Dey of Algiers to be included in the tribute that he owed to the Grand-Seigneur. She was sent to Abdul Hamid, who found her beautiful and elevated her to the rank of Kadine, that is to say he married her. She gave him Mahmud, the reigning sultan. Mahmud has always had a great respect for his mother. It is said that she greatly surpassed in amiability the Circassians or Georgians which is not surprising since she was French.

In 1818, her son Sultan Mahmud commissioned a fountain (sebil) known as "Nakşidil Sultan Sebil" in the memory of his mother. Her son, and her grandson Abdulmejid I also died of tuberculosis in 1839 and 1861 respectively.

== Issue ==
Together with Abdul Hamid, Nakşidil had three children, two sons and a daughter:

- Şehzade Murad Seyfullah (Topkapı Palace, 22 October 1783 – Topkapı Palace, 21 January 1785);
- Mahmud II (Topkapı Palace, 20 July 1785 – Istanbul, Turkey, 1 July 1839, buried in Mahmud II Mausoleum), 30th Sultan of the Ottoman Empire;
- Saliha Sultan (Topkapı Palace, 27 November 1786 – Topkapı Palace, 10 April 1788);

== Gallery ==
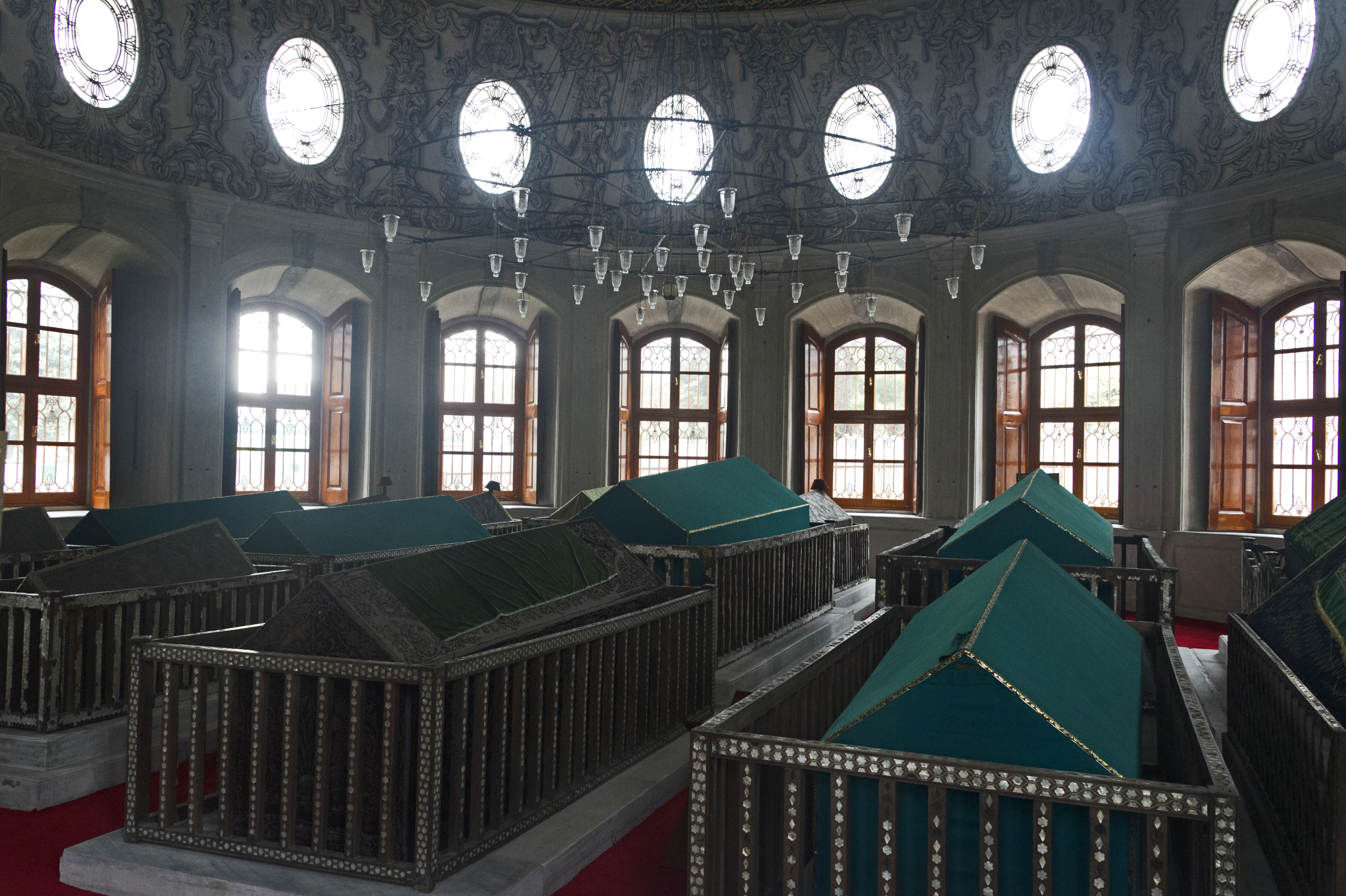
Naksidil Valide Sultan Mausoleum interior

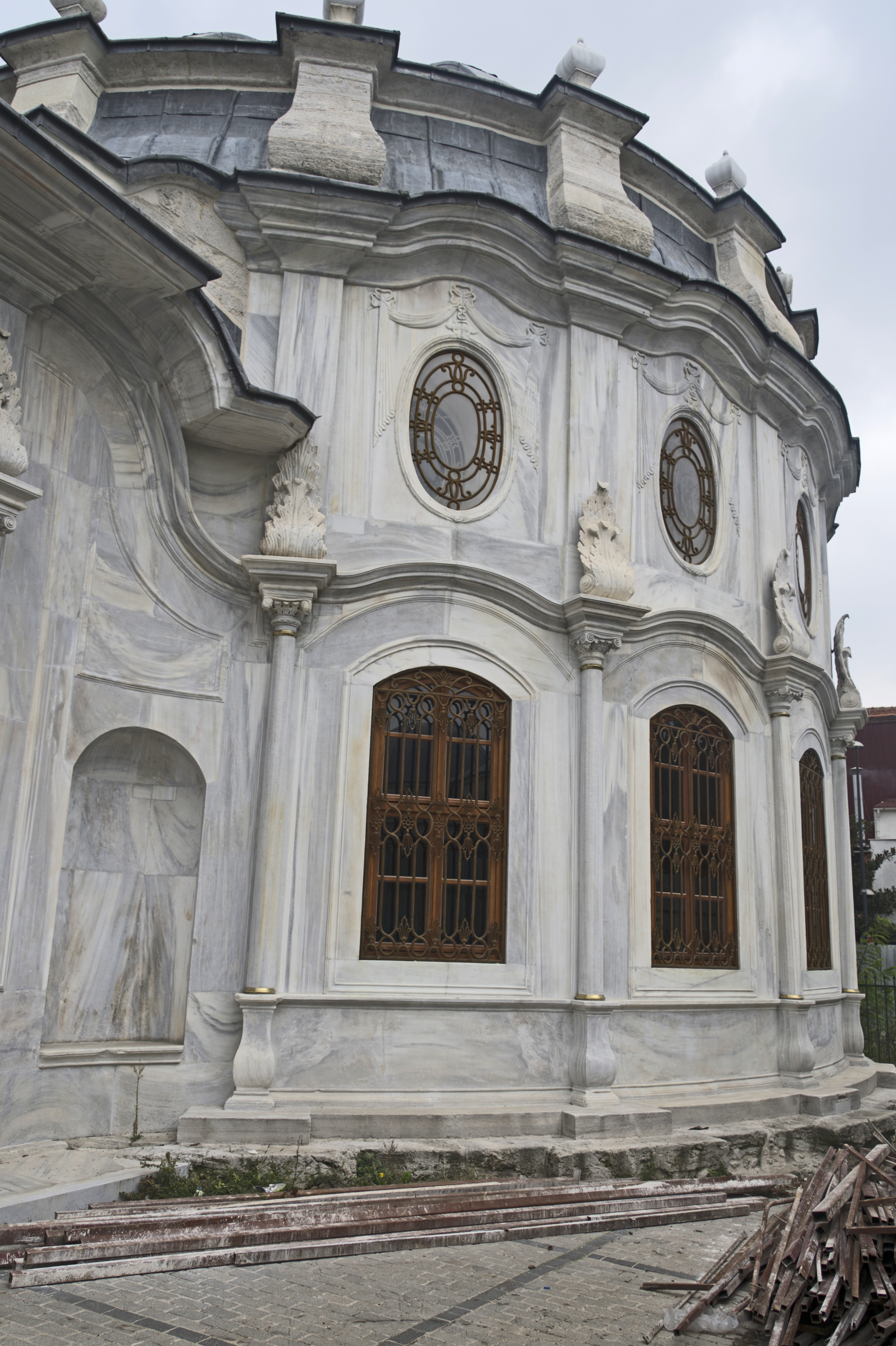
Naksidil Valide Sultan Mausoleum south side

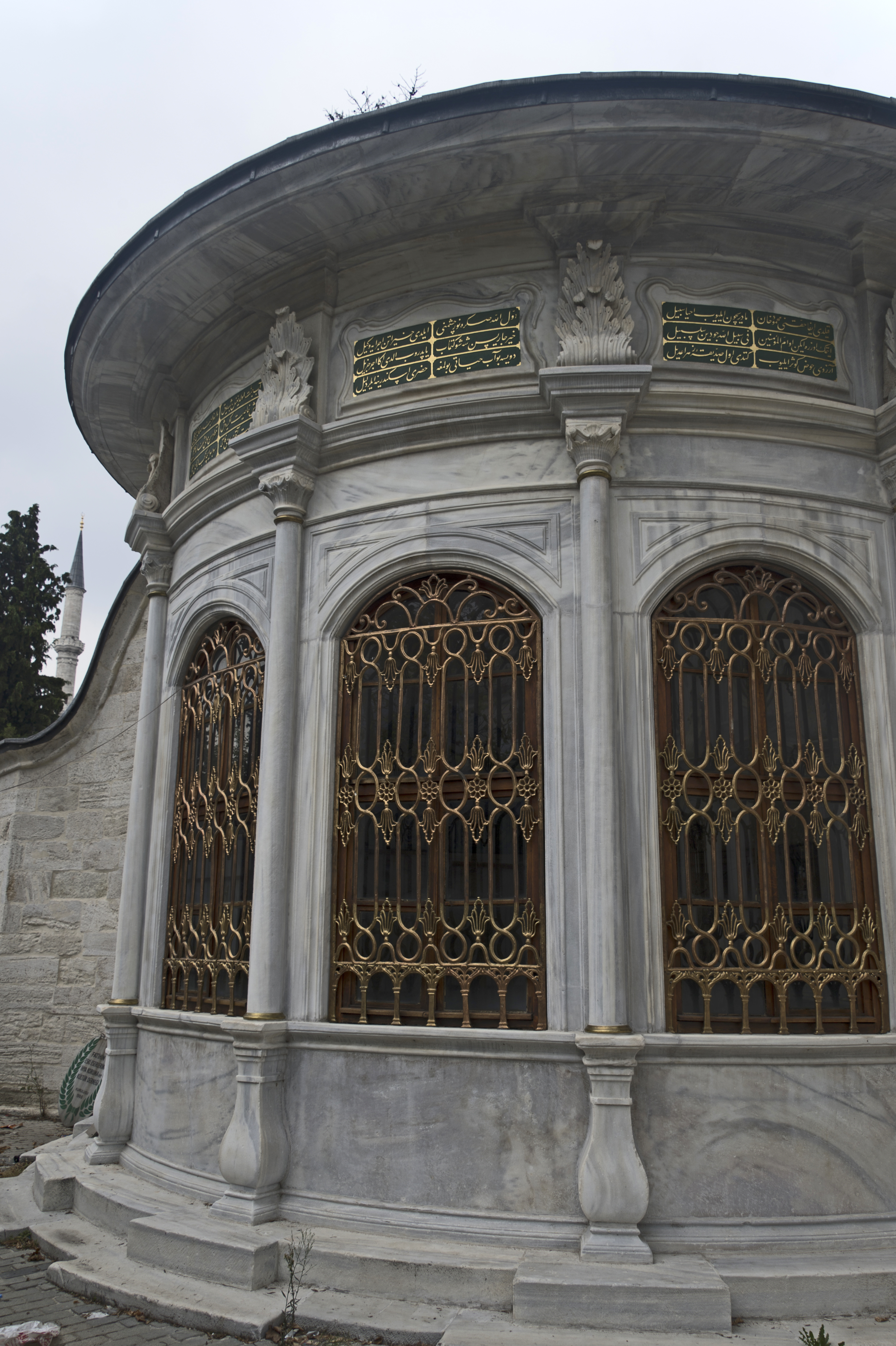
Naksidil Valide Sultan Mausoleum Sebil

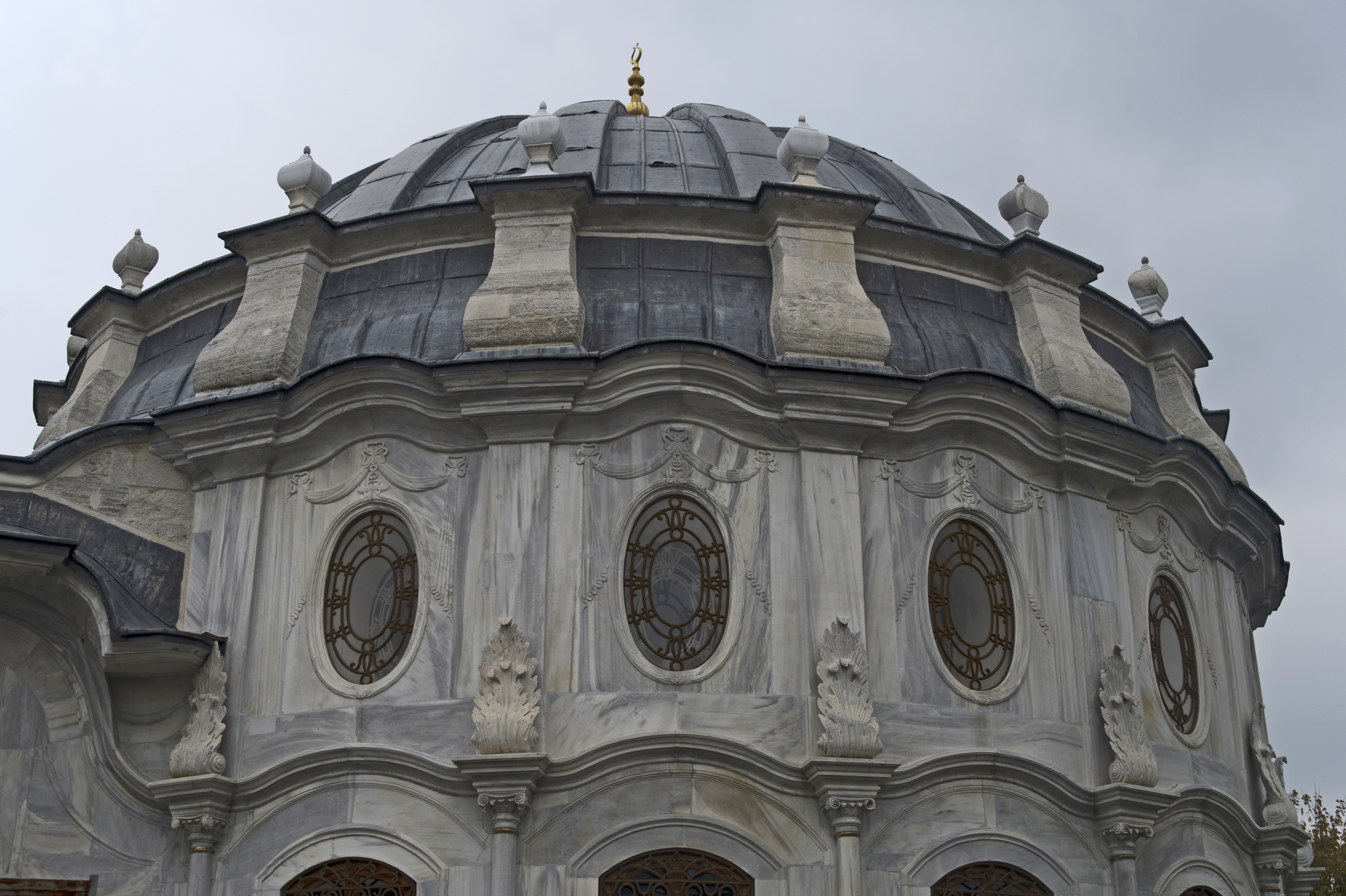
Naksidil Valide Sultan Mausoleum dome

== See also ==
- Ottoman dynasty
- Ottoman family tree
- List of Valide Sultans
- List of consorts of the Ottoman Sultans
- Aimée du Buc de Rivéry

== Sources ==
- Isom-Verhaaren, Christine (June 2006). "Royal French Women in the Ottoman Sultans' Harem: The Political Uses of Fabricated Accounts from the Sixteenth to the Twenty-first Century". Journal of World History. 17 (2): 159–196. doi:10.1353/jwh.2006.0038. JSTOR 20079373. S2CID 53349842.
- Uluçay, M. Çağatay (2011). Padişahların kadınları ve kızları. Ötüken. ISBN 978-9-754-37840-5.

Ottoman royalty
| Preceded by Sineperver Sultan | Valide Sultan; 28 July 1808 – 22 August 1817 | Succeeded by Bezmiâlem Sultan |
