= Fushë-Arrëz =

Municipality in Albania

- Municipality
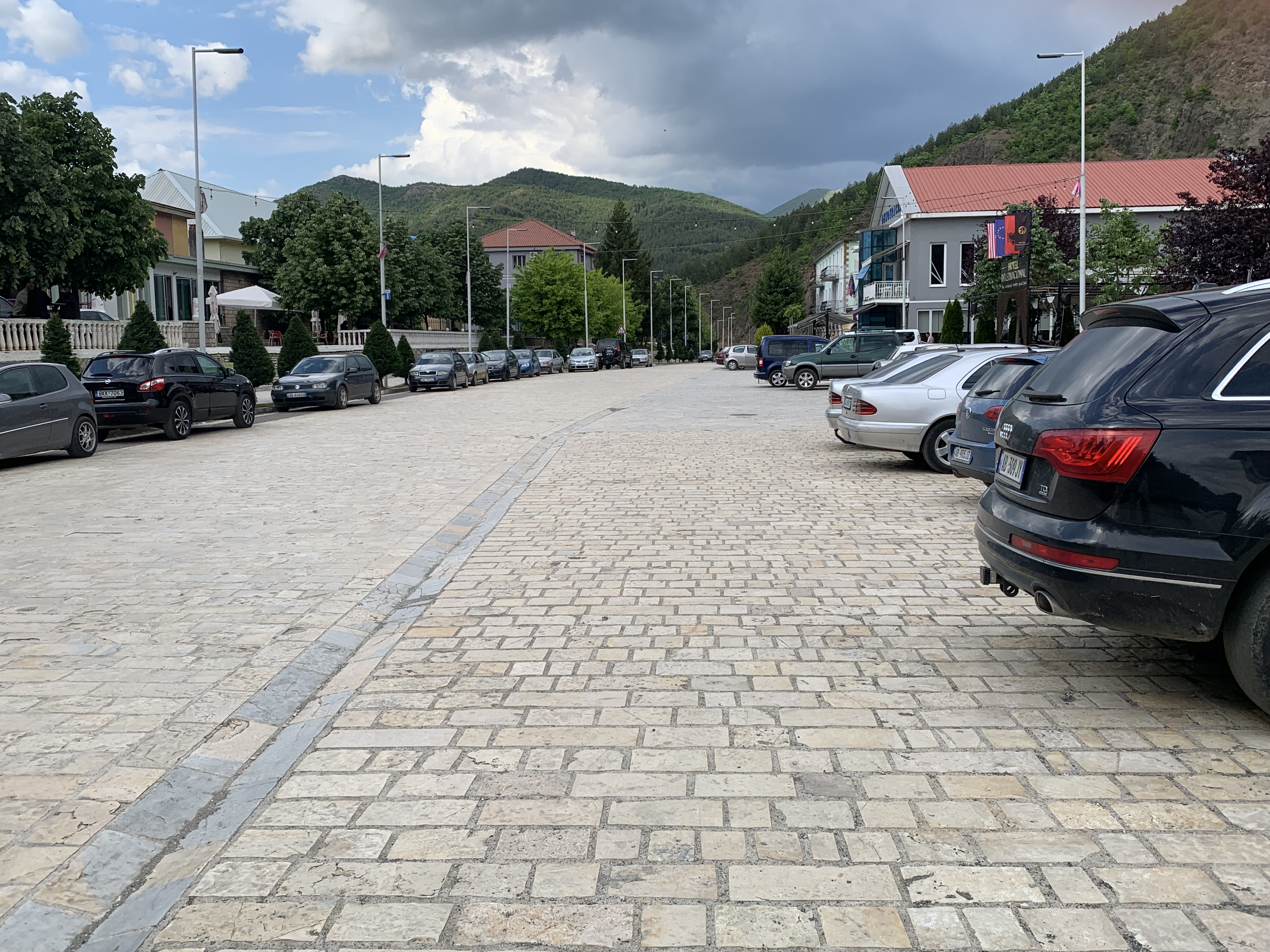
- Fushë-Arrëz main boulevard

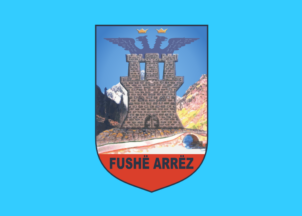
- Flag Emblem

- Coordinates: 42°12′N 20°25′E
- Country: Albania
- County: Shkodër

Government
  - Mayor: Hil Curri (BF)

Area
  - Municipality: 540.42 km^{2} (208.66 sq mi)

Population (2011)
  - Municipality: 7,405
  - Municipality density: 13.70/km^{2} (35.49/sq mi)
  - Administrative unit: 2,513
- Time zone: UTC+1 (CET)
  - Summer (DST): UTC+2 (CEST)
- Postal Code: 4402
- Area Code: (0)271
- Website: www.bashkiafushearrez.gov.al

Fushë-Arrëz (Albanian: [ˈfuʃə ˈarəz]; Albanian definite form: Fushë-Arrëzi) is a municipality and town in Shkodër County, northwestern Albania. The municipality consists of the administrative units of Blerim, Fierzë, Iballë, Qafë-Mali with Fushë-Arrëz constituting its seat. As of the Institute of Statistics estimate from the 2011 census, there were 2,513 people residing in Fushë-Arrëz and 7,405 in Fushë-Arrëz Municipality. The area of the municipality is 540.42 km^{2}. The etymology of Fushë Arrëz from the Albanian language translates to in English as “Field of nutlets”. The settlement of Fushë-Arrëz is historically part of the Mirditë region.
