= Kabakçı Mustafa =

Rebel leader in the Ottoman Empire

Kabakçı Mustafa (c. 1770 – 14 July 1808) was a rebel leader who caused the delay of Ottoman reformation in the early 19th century.

== Yamaks and Kabakçı ==
Yamaks were a special class of soldiers who were responsible in defending Bosphorous against Cossack pirates from Ukraine. Unlike janissaries they were from Black Sea Region of Turkey and not devshirme. But they liked to share the prestige of janissaries and considered themselves as a part of janissary. Kabakçı Mustafa was a sergeant of these yamaks in the castle of Rumelifeneri, on the European side of Bosphorous. He was from Rize, and probably about 35 years of age in 1807. According to legend, prior to being a yamak, he had fought against Russians in Anapa. The epithet Kabakçı which meant leader probably refers to his former battles. But except that almost nothing is known about his origin. He always appeared with two of his younger relatives both using the same name; Mustafa of Of and Mustafa of Pazar.

== Background ==
The reformist sultan Selim III (reigned 1789–1807) who was under the influence French Revolution tried to reform the institutions of the empire. His program was called Nizamı cedit (New Order). However, these efforts met with criticism of the reactionaries . The janissaries were afraid of being trained in western style and religious figures opposed non-Moslem methods in medieval institutions. The middle-class city dwellers also opposed Nizamı Cedit because of the new taxes to support the program and the general corruption of the Ottoman Porte.

== The beginning of the rebellion ==
On 25 May 1807 Raif Mehmet, the minister of Bosphorous, tried to persuade the yamaks to wear the new uniforms. It was clear that the next step would be the modern training. But the yamaks refused to wear these uniforms and they killed Raif Mehmet. This incident is usually considered as the beginning of the revolt. The yamaks then began marching to Constantinople, the capital about 30 km (19 mi) away. At the end of the first day they decided to elect a leader and they elected Kabakçı Mustafa as their leader. According to historians at this point it was an easy matter to suppress the revolt because the camp of well trained Nizamı cedit troops was nearby. But Köse Musa, a member of the porte whose title is roughly equivalent to interior minister (Turkish: sadaret kahyası) refused to use the modern troops against the yamaks and Selim III who was quite pacifist approved Köse Musa. In a few days it became clear that Köse Musa was supporting the rebels whose numbers had increased with accretion of many people including janissaries who were staying in the capital. (Ottoman Empire was in an uneasy armistice with Russian Empire during the War of the Fourth Coalition between French Empire and Russian Empire, so the main bulk of the army was in battle front. see Russo-Turkish War (1806–12))

== Kabakçı Mustafa as the de facto ruler of the empire ==
Kabakçı reached Constantinople in two days and began to rule the capital. In fact, Kabakçı was under the influence of Köse Musa and the Sheikh ul-Islam Topal Ataullah. He established a court and listed 11 names of high rank Nizami Cedit adherents to be executed. In several days those names were executed some with torture. Then he asked to abolish all institutions formed within the scope of Nizamı Cedit which the sultan had to agree. He also announced his distrust in the sultan and asked to take the two Ottoman princes (the future sultans namely Mustafa IV and Mahmud II) under his protection. After this last step Selim III resigned (or forced to resign by a fetwa of Ataullah) on 29 May 1807. Mustafa IV was enthroned as the new sultan.

== During the reign of Mustafa IV ==
The new sultan appointed Kabakçı as the new minister of Bosphorous. Kabakçı returned to his base. But his headquarters was quite near to Constantinople and he was still the de facto ruler of the capital. This period was one of the most chaotic periods of Constantinople history. Both the janissaries and the yamaks plundered the city. Soon it became clear that even Kabakçı was unable to cope with the anarchy. This period continued for about 14 months.

Meanwhile, Alemdar Mustafa, a derebey (lord) in Rusçuk (modern Ruse in North Bulgaria, then an Ottoman province) who was a supporter of former sultan Selim III decided to re-enthrone Selim to end the chaos. But before intervening he sent a squadron of 50 under commandship of Uzun Hacı Ali secretly to Kabakçı's headquarters. Unaware of the squadron, on the very same day (13 July 1808) Kabakçı had married. After the night full of marriage ceremony and potation, it was an easy matter for the squadron to raid the headquarters and kill Kabakçı. Soon after Alemdar Mustafa Pasha also marched to Constantinople and after some fighting yamaks were subdued.

== Aftermath ==
Mustafa IV was dethroned. But as a last minute precaution, he had ordered the execution of both Selim and Mahmud to be the sole male member of the Ottoman house. However, unlike unlucky Selim, Mahmud managed to survive and it was Mahmud who was enthroned as the new sultan.
