= Mustafa IV =

Sultan of the Ottoman Empire from 1807 to 1808

- Custodian of the Two Holy Mosques
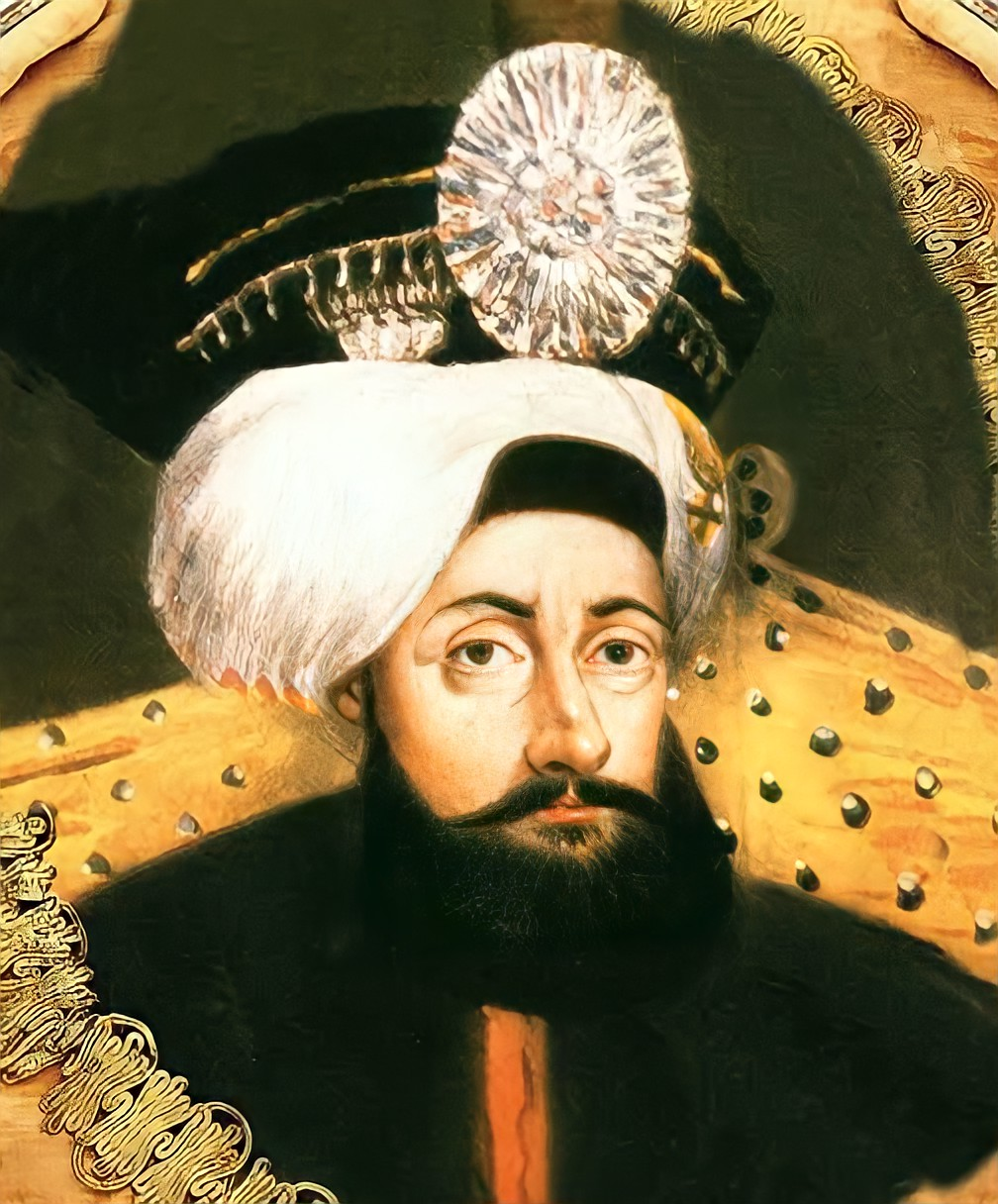

Sultan of the Ottoman Empire (Padishah)
- Reign: 29 May 1807 – 28 July 1808
- Predecessor: Selim III
- Successor: Mahmud II

Ottoman Caliph (Amir al-Mu'minin)
- Predecessor: Selim III
- Successor: Mahmud II
- Born: 8 September 1779; Constantinople, Ottoman Empire
- Died: 16 November 1808 (aged 29); Constantinople, Ottoman Empire
- Burial: Tomb of Abdul Hamid I, Fatih, Istanbul
- Consorts: Şevkinür Kadın; Peykidil Kadın; Dilpezir Kadın; Seyare Kadın
- Issue: Şehzade Ahmed; Emine Sultan
Names
- Mustafa bin Abdul Hamid
- Dynasty: Ottoman
- Father: Abdul Hamid I
- Mother: Sineperver Sultan
- Religion: Sunni Islam
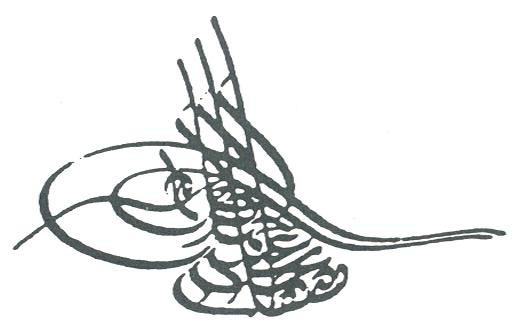
- Tughra

Mustafa IV (/ˈmʊstəfə/; Ottoman Turkish: مصطفى رابع, romanized: Muṣṭafâ-yi râbiʿ; 8 September 1779 – 16 November 1808) was the sultan of the Ottoman Empire from 1807 to 1808.

== Early life ==
Mustafa IV was born on 8 September 1779 in Constantinople. He was the son of Sultan Abdul Hamid I (1774–1789) and Sineperver Sultan.

Both he and his half-brother, Mahmud II, were the last remaining male members of the House of Osman after their cousin, the reformist Sultan Selim III (1789–1807). They alone were therefore eligible to inherit the throne from Selim, by whom they were treated favorably. Since Mustafa was the elder, he took precedence over his brother to the throne. During his short reign, Mustafa would save his cousin's life and order him murdered. Mustafa was Sultan Selim III's favourite crown prince, but he deceived his cousin and cooperated with the rebels to take his throne.

== Reign ==
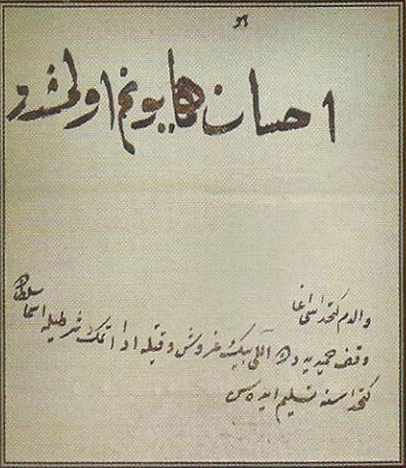
Document issued in the name of Mustafa IV

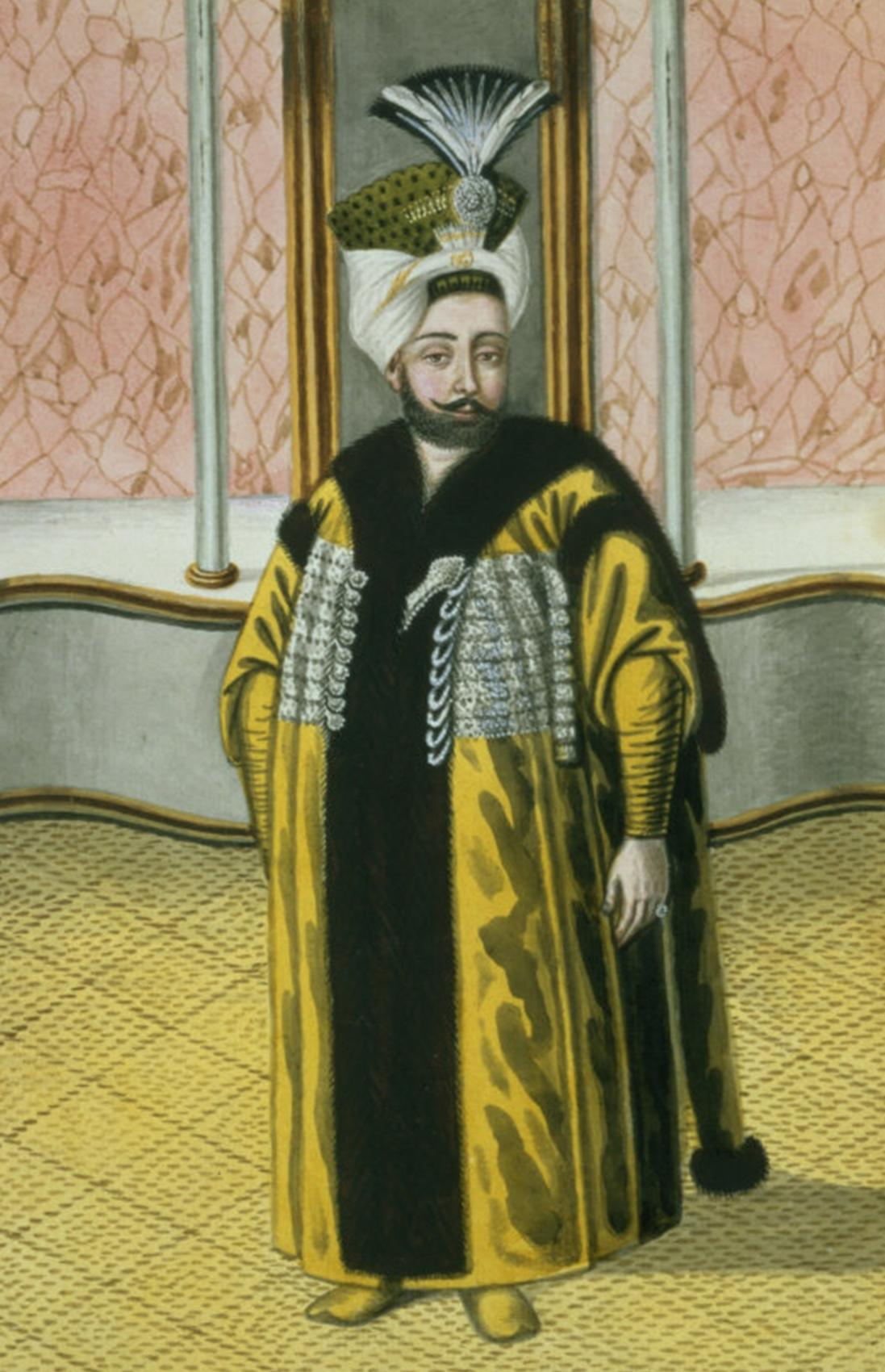
Portrait of Mustafa IV by John Young, published 1815

Mustafa ascended to the throne after the deposition of his cousin, Selim, on 29 May 1807. He came to the throne in the wake of the turbulent events that led to the fatwa against Selim for "introducing among the Muslims the manners of infidels and showing an intention to suppress the Janissaries". Selim fled to the palace, where he swore fealty to his cousin as the new sultan, and attempted to commit suicide. Mustafa spared his life by smashing the cup of poison that his cousin tried to drink.

Mustafa's brief reign was turbulent. Immediately upon ascending to the throne, the Janissaries rioted throughout Constantinople, looting and murdering anyone who appeared to support Selim. More threatening, however, was a truce signed with the Russians, which freed Mustafa Pasha, a pro-reformist commander stationed on the Danube, to march his army back to Constantinople to restore Selim. With the aid of the Grand Vizier of Adrianople, the army marched on the capital and seized the palace.

Sarıbeyzade Aleko, the interpreter of Fenerli Divan-ı Hümayun, was executed on 11 September 1807 because he was involved in spying on government affairs unrelated to his job. It was written on the label hanging around his neck that he gave state secrets to the enemy. This execution strained relations with France. French envoy Sebastiani protested the execution of Aleko, who was under the government's patronage, by going to Babıali. After the cease-fire agreement signed in the Russian lada and the turmoil in the Silistra army, the Ottoman troops returned to Edirne, who had no army character left.

Meanwhile, in Istanbul and Edirne, after a long winter with severe frosts, shortages and wood shortages were experienced. Troops starved, and the cadre of Edirne was devastated. Soldiers were asked to dispatch soldiers from the provincial governors until only a few had come from places near Istanbul, such as Izmit and Şile. The pro-New Order protestors in Anatolia and Çapanoğlu Süleyman Bey, in the first place, had cut all kinds of aid towards Istanbul.

Attempting to secure his position by positing himself as Osman's only surviving heir, Mustafa ordered Selim and his brother Mahmud murdered at Topkapı Palace in Constantinople. He then ordered his guards to show the rebels Selim's body, and they promptly tossed it into the palace's inner courtyard. Mustafa then ascended his throne, assuming that Mahmud was also dead, but the prince had been hiding in a bath furnace. Just as the rebels demanded that Mustafa "yield his place to a worthier", Mahmud revealed himself, and Mustafa was deposed. The failure of his short reign prevented the efforts to undo the reforms, which continued under Mahmud.

== Death ==
Mustafa was later killed on Mahmud's orders on 16 November 1808 and was buried in his father's mausoleum.

== Family ==
Due to his short reign, Mustafa IV did not have a large family. He had four known consorts, a son and a daughter, who died newborn.

=== Consorts ===
Mustafa IV had four known consorts:

- Şevkinür Kadın. BaşKadin (first consort). She died in 1812 and was buried in Abdülhamid I's mausoleum.
- Peykidil Kadın. She was executed in August 1808 by Mahmud II, accused of plotting against him with Mustafa IV and Alemdar Mustafa Pasha. According to sources, she was tied to a weight and thrown into the sea from the Maiden's Tower. Along with her, several concubines accused of being her accomplices were also executed.
- Dilpezir Kadın. She died in 1809 and was buried in Abdülhamid I's mausoleum.
- Seyare Kadın. She died in 1817 and was buried in Abdülhamid I's mausoleum.

=== Sons ===
Mustafa IV had only one son:

- Şehzade Ahmed (1809–1809). Born posthumously.

In the decades following Mustafa's death, a certain Ahmed Nedir, a Georgian man, claimed to be Mustafa IV's secret son, born after his mother, a Russian woman, was forced to flee Constantinople while she was pregnant following Mustafa IV's death. According to another version, Ahmed Nedir was the Şehzade Ahmed himself, whose death was faked in order to hide the child abroad, for fear that Mahmud II execute him. His claims were never proven or taken into consideration.

=== Daughters ===
Mustafa IV had only one daughter:

- Emine Sultan (6 May 1809 – October 1809). Born posthumously, she is buried with her father in the Hamidiye mausoleum. Her wet nurse was Muhtaviye Hatun, wife of Said Bey (died 16 November 1812, buried in Karacaahmet Cemetery).

== Sources ==
- Haskan, Mehmet Nermi (1 January 2018). Hamîd-i Evvel Külliyesi ve Çevresi. Istanbul Ticaret Borsasi. ISBN 978-6-051-37663-9.
- Sakaoğlu, Necdet (2015). Bu Mülkün Sultanları. Alfa Yayıncılık. ISBN 978-6-051-71080-8.

Mustafa IV House of Osman Born: 8 September 1779 Died: 15 November 1808
Regnal titles
Preceded by Selim III	Sultan of the Ottoman Empire; 29 May 1807 – 15 November 1808	Succeeded by Mahmud II
Sunni Islam titles
Preceded by Selim III	Caliph of the Ottoman Caliphate; 29 May 1807 – 15 November 1808	Succeeded by Mahmud II
