= Alemdar Mustafa Pasha =

Ottoman military commander (died 1808)

Alemdar / Bayraktar Mustafa Pasha
- بایراکتار مصطفی پاشا
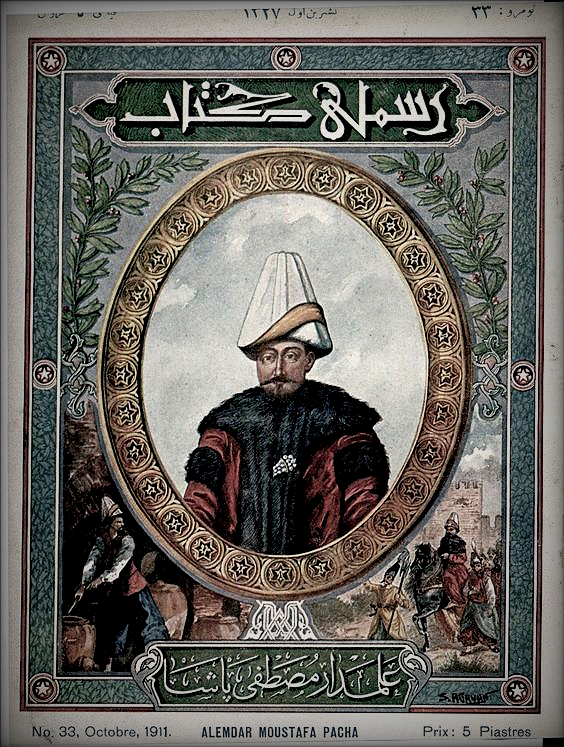

Grand Vizier of the Ottoman Empire
- In office 29 July 1808 – 15 November 1808
- Monarch: Mahmud II
- Preceded by: Çelebi Mustafa Pasha
- Succeeded by: Çavuşbaşı Memiş Pasha

Personal details
- Born: c.1750
- Died: 15 November 1808 (aged 57–58) Constantinople, Ottoman Empire (modern Istanbul, Turkey)

Alemdar Mustafa Pasha (also called Bayraktar Mustafa Pasha; 1750 – 15 November 1808) was an Ottoman military commander, serving as grand vizier in 1808.

He was born into the family of a Janissary, possibly in Rusçuk (modern-day Ruse, Bulgaria), although varying information exists about his birthplace. He received the epithet bayraktar or alam-dar, both meaning 'flag-bearer', in Turkish and Persian respectively, and probably referring to his military rank in the janissary corps, during the Russo-Turkish War of 1768–1774. After the war, he left the corps and eventually became a powerful notable and military commander in Rumelia. He became a strong supporter of Selim III's reforms and became a rallying point for opponents of the new regime after Selim's deposition in 1807. In July 1808, he took power in a military coup, replacing Sultan Mustafa IV with Mahmud II and becoming grand vizier. He established a dictatorship shortly after the coup with the Sultan as the figurehead. He attempted to revive Selim's reform program, likely to keep up technologically with the rest of Europe, modernize the Ottoman army, and prevent further humiliation caused by the wars lost in the Balkans, but he himself was killed only months later, during a new rebellion by the Janissaries.

Alemdar Mustafa Pasha is often regarded as a pioneering figure who recognized the need for a modern army. He was instrumental in setting up the French military mission in 1796.

== Early career ==
Alemdar Mustafa is believed to have been born in about 1750 or 1765 in Hotin (modern-day Khotyn, Ukraine) into the family of a prosperous janissary. He was of Albanian origin and hailed from the village of Goskovë near Korçë. He rose to power through the janissary corps, and, having been promoted to commandership, took part in the wars against Austria and the Russian Empire. It was during his service in the Russo-Turkish War of 1768–1774 that he acquired the epithet bayraktar or alemdar, both meaning 'flag-bearer' and probably referring to his military rank in the janissary corps, although another source suggests that he received it later. He left the janissaries after the Russo-Turkish War of 1787–1792 and became a large-scale cattle-dealer and agriculturalist, living near Rusçuk. He became a close associate of Ismail Ağa Tirseniklioğlu, the leader of Rusçuk and a powerful provincial notable in the Ottoman Balkans (Rumelia). Mustafa showed his military prowess in his battles against the rebel Osman Pazvantoğlu. In 1803, Ismail Ağa appointed Mustafa the ayan (in this period, a semi-official local leadership position) of Hezargrad, near Rusçuk. After Ismail Ağa's death in 1806, Mustafa replaced him and became the most powerful leader in present-day eastern Bulgaria.

The deposition of the reforming Sultan Selim III in 1807, and his replacement with the reactionary Mustafa IV by the Janissaries and other opponents of reform, provoked Alemdar Mustafa Pasha to lead his army of Albanians and Bosnians to Constantinople in an attempt to reinstate Selim III and restore his reforms. After Alemdar's arrival, Mustafa IV ordered the killing of Selim III and Mahmud II, succeeding in the former case. Seeing Selim III dead, Alemdar offered fealty to Mahmud II (Selim's cousin), who was instated as sultan, with Alemdar as his grand vizier.

As grand vizier, Alemdar purged the soldiers who had rebelled against Selim, removed conservatives from government positions and replaced them with men sympathetic to reform. He modernised the army and navy and attempted to reform the Janissaries, but Mahmud, fearing a political backlash by the elite corps, halted these changes. Alemdar's power and influence and his arrogance in wielding it caused a rebellion against him . In November 1808, the Janissaries attacked the Porte and laid siege to the stone powder magazine where he and his personal guard had taken refuge. As the Janissaries were about to break in, the powder barrels exploded, killing Alemdar, his guard, and several hundred Janissaries.

== Alemdar Incident ==
Alemdar Mustafa Pasha had always been a keen supporter of Sultan Selim III. With Mustafa IV on the throne and rebels commanded by Kabakçı Mustafa in command of the Ottoman capital, Alemdar summoned a council in Rusçuk and decided to take action.

On 21 June 1808, Alemdar and his army of about 15,000 men arrived in Constantinople in an event that came to be known as the Alemdar Incident (Turkish: Alemdar Vakası). They easily took control, and Alemdar ordered the rebels to be killed or exiled.

After Mustafa IV learned of these events, he decided to have his uncle, Selim III, and his younger brother, Prince Mahmud, killed so that he should be the only surviving member of the imperial family. The executioners first arrived in Selim III's room in the palace. Selim III, who was playing a reed flute and had no weapons, resisted with his flute, but his efforts proved futile and he was strangled to death. His dead body was brought to Alemdar who wept, thinking that he had failed in all his objectives.

His men warned him that Mustafa IV's men planned to kill Prince Mahmud as well. The executioners had raided the prince's room, but the servants hid him on the roof. Alemdar and his men broke down the palace doors, killed the rebels and eventually saved the prince.

Alemdar Mustafa Pasha declared Mahmud the new sultan (Mahmud II), and became his grand vizier.

== In the service of Sultan Mahmud II ==
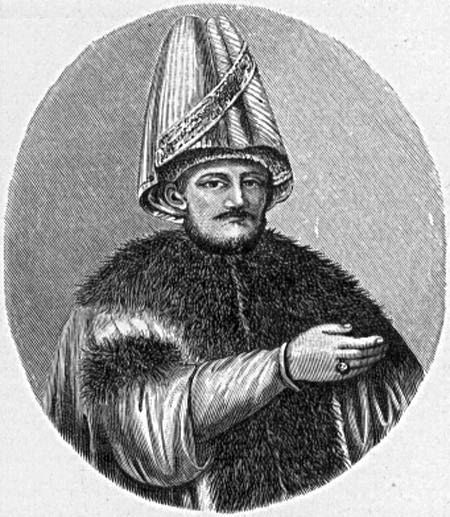
A picture of Alemdar Mustafa Pasha.

But differences of opinion soon emerged between the new sultan Mahmud II and Alemdar. First of all, Alemdar made an agreement with the rebel representative from Anatolian lands, which was called the Charter of Alliance (Sened-i Ittifak). Sultan Mahmud thought that this agreement threatened his authority and withdrew his support for the pasha.

Secondly, he re-established the army of Nizam-i Djedid ('New Order'), calling it the Sekban-I Cedid Army. The Nizam-ı Cedid Army was a hated rival to the Janissaries so the new name has been interpreted as an effort to appease them. Furthermore, Alemdar conducted an investigation into the Janissary corps and fired men who were not actually Janissaries but receiving Janissary salaries all the same.

== Death ==
Alemdar's measures laid the ground for later reforms in the Ottoman Empire. But meanwhile, the ruling elite resented him. On 15 November 1808, about a thousand Janissaries raided Alemdar Mustafa Pasha's house. Realising he could not survive the assault, he ignited the gunpowder reserves in the cellar of his house, killing himself and approximately 400 Janissaries in the ensuing explosion. He was buried in the courtyard of the Zeynep Sultan Mosque in Istanbul.

A street in Istanbul near the Sublime Porte is named after Alemdar Mustafa Pasha. A plaque there stating that his father was a Janissary from Ruscuk.

== See also ==
- List of Ottoman grand viziers
- Ottoman military reforms
- Selim III

== General references ==
- Shaw, S. J.; Shaw, E. Z. (1997) [1977]. History of the Ottoman Empire. Vol. 2. Cambridge University Press.
- Ortayli, İlber (1983). İmparatorluğun En Uzun Yüzyılı [Longest century of the empire] (in Turkish). Istanbul: Hil Yayinlari. (English translation: Ortayli, İlber (2021). The Empire's Longest Century. Translated by Ross, Jonathan. Istanbul: Kronik. ISBN 9786257631266.)

Political offices
Preceded by Çelebi Mustafa Pasha	Grand Vizier of the Ottoman Empire; 29 July 1808 – 15 November 1808	Succeeded by Çavuşbaşı Memiş Pasha
