= Beyhan Sultan (daughter of Mustafa III) =

Ottoman princess, daughter of Mustafa III and Adilşah Kadın

- Born: 13 January 1766; Topkapı Palace, Constantinople, Ottoman Empire
- Died: 7 November 1824 (aged 58); Constantinople, Ottoman Empire
- Burial: Mihrişah Sultan Complex, Eyüp, Istanbul
- Spouse: Çelik Mustafa Pasha (m. 1784; died 1799)
- Issue: Hatice Hanımsultan
- Dynasty: Ottoman
- Father: Mustafa III
- Mother: Adilşah Kadın
- Religion: Sunni Islam

Beyhan Sultan (Ottoman Turkish: بیحان سلطان; 13 January 1766 – 7 November 1824) was an Ottoman princess, the daughter of Sultan Mustafa III and his consort Adilşah Kadın. She was the half sister of Sultan Selim III.

== Early life ==
Beyhan Sultan was born on 13 January 1766 in the Topkapı Palace. Her father was Sultan Mustafa III, and her mother was Adilşah Kadın. She had a sister, Hatice Sultan, two years younger than her. The sisters remained very close to each other throughout their lives.

After her father's death in 1774, when she was nine years old, she followed her mother and sister to the Old Palace. Due to the isolated environment, both Beyhan and her sister developed symptoms of depression, anxiety, and other troubling behaviours. In particular, Beyhan fainted frequently and had hysterical episodes of screaming and crying. Her mother, then wrote to the new sultan, Abdul Hamid I, half-brother of Mustafa III, to allow her daughters to marry, which would allow them to leave confinement in the Palace. The sultan granted her request and found husbands for the two princesses.

== Marriage ==
When Beyhan was eighteen, her mother wrote a letter to Sultan Abdul Hamid I requesting him to get her daughters married. In 1784, her uncle Sultan Abdul Hamid I arranged her marriage to Silahdar Mustafa Pasha, the governor of Aleppo. The marriage took place on 22 April 1784, after the pasha's return to Istanbul. On 5 May, her trousseau, and the next day, Beyhan Sultan herself were transported from the Topkapı Palace to her palace at Cağaloğlu. She was nineteen years old.

The two together had a daughter named Hatice Hanımsultan, born in 1785, she was married in 1799. Beyhan was widowed at her husband's death in March 1799, and like most of the princesses of her generation she did not remarry. Her brother Selim used to visit her every Wednesday and they went to numerous concerts together. Although her sister Hatice Sultan became the most famous and influential princess of their generation, Beyhan was also active in supporting Selim's reforms and innovation and sharing her interest in Europe, especially art, architecture and design and fashion. She even organized parties for the wives of foreign ambassadors.

Beyhan had educated the future imperial consort Hoşyar Kadın, who was to become the wife of her cousin Sultan Mahmud II and the mother of Mihrimah Sultan and Zeynep Sultan.

== Lands and endowments ==
Beyhan was a wealthy princess and received many mukata'as from her brother Selim III and her uncle Abdul Hamid. She owned two palaces on the Bosphorus (Beşiktaş, Arnavutköy). She was also given the Old Çırağan Palace, one of the sites of the Lale Devri (Tulip period) entertainments, and Beyhan had it demolished with the approval of Selim III and began construction of a European-style palace on the site in 1791. The new palace was ready in 1795, just when his sister Hatice was busy building her seaside palace with the help of Melling, a European designer. She built twin palaces in Yeşillioğlu, giving the other to her sister Hatice. She received malikanes in the district of Andrusa, Kalamata, Fanar, Karitena and Londar on 1802. In 1796, she appointed Numan ağa, the voyvoda of these districts, to act as her agent (kethüda) to collect the cizye and 'avariz dues from her çiftliks. In 1802, she appointed Al-Hac Hasan ağa as her kethüda when Hüseyn ağa, a former voyvoda, was too oppressive. She also appears to have received the malikane of the island of Andros and Syros in 1789.

In 1801, she had a fountain built in her name in the Kuruçeşme neighbourhood of Istanbul. In 1804, she built another fountain in her name on the banks of Akıntıburnu. In 1817, she repaired the Mesih Pasha Fountain located in the Hırka-i Şerif. She also built two fountains near her palaces during the reign of brother Selim. Beyhan Sultan built a school in the vicinity of Yeşilioğlu Palace, opposite of Hatice Sultan Palace in the memory of her mother.

The Beyhan Sultan Fountain, which is one of the most beautiful works of the Ottoman art of its kind in the Turkish era, was completely dismantled, but it has not been revived until today, in case of street expansion. Although the Beyhan Sultan Fountain was created entirely under the influence of Western art, it was a monument that marked the location of a beach adorned this coast, apart from being a work that added beauty to the Bosphorus.

== Patroness of arts ==
Beyhan, her brother Selim, and her sister Hatice Sultan had a considerable enthusiasm for European arts. Both Beyhan, and Selim admired Mevlevi Sheikh Galib, probably a major poet of the age, and were his patrons. Born and educated in Istanbul, the son of a Mevlevi dervish, he became the sheyh of the Galata lodge. She also had copies made of his poems.

== Death ==
Beyhan Sultan died on 7 November 1824, at the age of fifty eight, and was buried in the mausoleum of Mihrişah Sultan located in Eyüp.

== Issue ==
By her husband, Beyhan Sultan had a daughter:

- Hatice Hanımsultan (1785 - After 1799). Called after Beyhan's sister, Hatice Sultan. She married in 1799.

== See also ==
- List of Ottoman princesses

== Sources ==
- Sakaoğlu, Necdet (2008). Bu mülkün kadın sultanları: Vâlide sultanlar, hâtunlar, hasekiler, kadınefendiler, sultanefendiler. Oğlak Yayıncılık. ISBN 978-9-753-29623-6.
- Uluçay, Mustafa Çağatay (2011). Padişahların kadınları ve kızları. Ankara: Ötüken. ISBN 978-9-754-37840-5.
- Ersöz, Burçak (2020). III. Mustafa'nin kızı Beyhan Sultan'in Hayatı (1766-1824) (in Turkish). Istanbul University Institute of Social Sciences.
