= Hatice Sultan (daughter of Mustafa III) =

Ottoman princess, daughter of Mustafa III and Adilşah Kadın

- Born: 14 June 1768; Topkapı Palace, Constantinople, Ottoman Empire
- Died: 17 July 1822 (aged 54); Constantinople, Ottoman Empire
- Burial: Mihrişah Sultan Complex, Eyüp, Istanbul
- Spouse: Seyyid Ahmed Pasha (m. 1786; died 1798)
- Issue: Sultanzade Alaeddin Pasha
- Dynasty: Ottoman
- Father: Mustafa III
- Mother: Adilşah Kadın
- Religion: Sunni Islam

Hatice Sultan (Ottoman Turkish: خدیجه سلطان; 14 June 1768 – 17 July 1822) was an Ottoman princess, the daughter of Sultan Mustafa III and his consort Adilşah Kadın. She was the half sister of Sultan Selim III.

== Early life ==
Hatice Sultan was born on 14 June 1768 in the Topkapı Palace. Her father was Sultan Mustafa III, and her mother was Adilşah Kadın. She had a full sister named Beyhan Sultan, two years elder to her. The two sisters were particularly close throughout their lives. After her father's death in 1774, when she was six years old, she followed her mother and sister to the Old Palace.

Due to the isolated environment, both Hatice and her sister developed symptoms of depression, anxiety, and other troubling behaviors. Her mother, Adilşah Kadın, then wrote to the new sultan, Abdul Hamid I, half-brother of Mustafa III, to allow her daughters to marry, which would allow them to leave confinement in the Palace. The sultan granted her request and found husbands for the two princesses.

== Marriage ==
On 3 November 1786, her uncle Sultan Abdul Hamid I betrothed her to the guardian of Khotin, Vezir Seyyid Ahmed Pasha. The spouse was over fifty and already father of many children. The marriage took place six days later on 9 November, and on the same day she and her trousseau was carried to her palace located in Arnavutköyü.

By her husband, Hatice had a son, Sultanzade Alaeddin Pasha (1788/1789 – 1812). She was allowed to accompany her husband when he was exiled to İzmit. However, three years later, when he was appointed the governor of Egypt, she had to return to Istanbul. She was widowed at his death in 1798, and like most of the princesses of her generation she didn't remarry. Their son Alaeddin Pasha married her cousin Hibetullah Sultan, daughter of Abdul Hamid I.

== Patroness of architecture ==
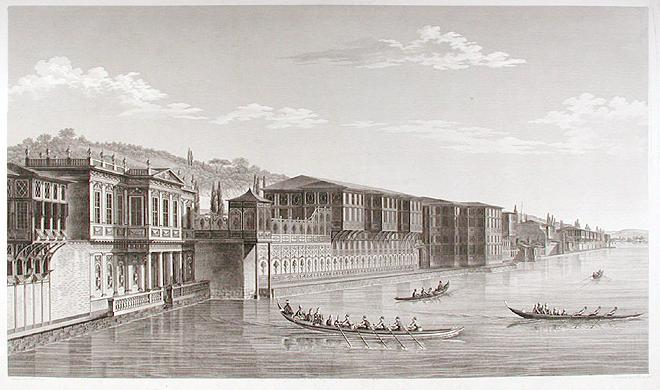
Engraving of the Hatice Sultan Mansion, by Antoine Ignace Melling, about 1800

Antoine Ignace Melling, an architect-cum-designer, began working for her in the 1790s. Melling, born in Karlsruhe to a family of artists from Lorraine, a region in France, lived in Istanbul for eighteen years from 1784 to 1802. The multi-talented artist caught the attention of the princess while working for Friedrich Hübsch, the Danish chargé d'affaires, whom she had visited at his villa in Büyükdere. She was a collector of porcelain, she had developed interest of porcelain from Saxony, a state in Holy Roman Empire, as well as from Austria and France.

Hatice had been allocated the Neşatabad Palace in 1791, at Defterdarburnu on the European shores of the Bosphorus. The reconstruction of her palace took three years, and was completed in 1794. She took insatiable interest in the decoration of her palace. After her death her palace was allocated to Adile Sultan, the daughter of her cousin Mahmud II, after her marriage in 1845, she spent her winters in Neşatabad Palace until 1866.

Sultan Selim III is known to have paid frequent visits to his half-sisters, which became all the more regular during Ramadan. He visited Hatice repeatedly for iftar banquets, and even had apartments reserved for overnight stays at Defterdarburnu. Hatice was close to Selim, who cared for her genuinely. Selim shared with her his detailed plans to acquaint the "devout and unbending" Muslims with European arts and civilisation. She appears to have adopted Selim's ideas and preferences as her own. Hatice became known as the most important and influential princess of her generation.

Melling acquired European goods for Hatice and also taught her the Latin alphabet. Melling's beautiful sketches of the newly built mansions along the waterfront clearly exhibit the influence of French neoclassical, baroque, and rococo styles used in the construction, decoration, and furnishings of the palace of Hatice Sultan and those of other dignitaries in Istanbul.

The letters testify not only to Hatice's insatiable interest in the decoration of her palace, but also to her drive and desire to be in command at all times a few letters concerning some chairs, perhaps (imitations of) French imports in the French kings Louis XV and Louis XVI style, are a case in point. at the time chairs and armchairs were a novelty in Ottoman interiors.

Hatice had an alleged intimate relationship with Melling from 1796 to 1800, and she caused scandal when she invited him to reside in her palace, after which Selim distanced himself from her. In 1800 Melling was apparently forced to quit her service, and in mid-1802 he left Istanbul for good. Immediately afterwards, Selim recommenced his visits to her.

In 1805, Hatice commissioned Adilşah Kadın Mosque and Şişehane Mosque in the memory of her mother. In 1806, Hatice commissioned a fountain in her name around the Spice Bazaar in Istanbul.

== Death ==
Hatice Sultan died on 17 July 1822, at the age of fifty four, and was buried in the mausoleum of Mihrişah Sultan located in Eyüp.

After her death, her belongings were assigned to her sister Beyhan; her probate inventories included more than five hundred pieces of European porcelain, which appear to have been kept in three different parts of her palace. Her debts were covered by her cousin Mahmud II.

== Issue ==
By her husband, Hatice Sultan had a son:

- Sultanzade Alaeddin Pasha (c. 1788 – January 1812, Scutari). On 3 February 1803 he married her cousin Hibetullah Sultan, a daughter of Sultan Abdul Hamid I, without known issue.

== See also ==
- List of Ottoman princesses

== Sources ==
- Artan, Tülay (2011). Eighteenth century Ottoman princesses as collectors: Chinese and European porcelains in the Topkapı Palace Museum.
- Davis, Fanny (1986). The Ottoman Lady: A Social History from 1718 to 1918. Greenwood Publishing Group. ISBN 978-0-313-24811-5.
- Sakaoğlu, Necdet (2008). Bu mülkün kadın sultanları: Vâlide sultanlar, hâtunlar, hasekiler, kadınefendiler, sultanefendiler. Oğlak Yayıncılık. ISBN 978-9-753-29623-6.
- Uluçay, Mustafa Çağatay (2011). Padişahların kadınları ve kızları. Ankara: Ötüken. ISBN 978-9-754-37840-5.
