= Adilşah Kadın =

Consort of Sultan Mustafa III

- Born: c. 1748
- Died: 19 December 1803 (aged 54–55); Constantinople, Ottoman Empire (now Istanbul, Turkey)
- Burial: Mustafa III Mausoleum, Laleli Mosque, Istanbul
- Consort: Mustafa III
- Issue: Beyhan Sultan; Hatice Sultan
Names
- Turkish: Ayşe Adilşah Kadın; Ottoman Turkish: عادل شاہ قادین
- Religion: Sunni Islam

Ayşe Adilşah Kadın (Ottoman Turkish: عادل شاہ قادین; "the living one" or "womanly" and "fairness/justice of the Şah"; c. 1748 - 19 December 1803) was a consort of Ottoman Sultan Mustafa III.

== Life ==
Of Circassian descent, Adilşah became a concubine consort of Mustafa III via the Black Sea slave trade. She was given the title of 'Third Consort'. On 13 January, 1766, she gave birth to her first child, a daughter, Beyhan Sultan in the Topkapı Palace. Two years later, on 14 June 1768 she gave birth to her second child, a daughter, Hatice Sultan, in the Topkapı Palace.

After the death of Mustafa in 1774, she and her daughters settled in the Old Palace. Due to the isolated environment, both her daughters developed symptoms of depression, anxiety, and other troubling behaviors. Adilşah then wrote to the new sultan, Abdülhamid I, half-brother of Mustafa III, to allow her daughters to marry, so that they could leave their confinement in the Palace. The sultan granted her request and found husbands for the two princesses.

She had two foundations in the VGM Archive, which are recorded in the book numbered K.171. In her original foundation, dated 1795, it is seen that she devoted the mosque she had built in Istanbul, determined the officers of the mosque, the services they were assigned and their wages. She also devoted three large farms and a plot of trees and buildings to constitute the income of the foundation. In the zeyl foundation, dated 1797, there are provisions regarding the reorganization of the foundation's trustees.

After her death, her daughter Beyhan Sultan built a school in the vicinity of Yeşilioğlu Palace, opposite of Hatice Sultan Palace in memory of her mother. In 1805, Hatice Sultan built Adilşah Kadın Mosque in her memory.

The mosque was located in a large embankment site surrounded by a uniform wall. On the other hand, the primary school in her name was on the opposite side of the courtyard in front of the Tekfur Palace, adjacent to the Şişehane, and was made of wood.

== Death ==
Adilşah Kadın died on 19 December 1803 during the month of Ramadan and was buried in Mustafa III's mausoleum, Laleli Mosque, Istanbul.

== Issue ==
Together with Mustafa, Adilşah had two daughters:

- Beyhan Sultan (Topkapı Palace, 13 January 1766 – Istanbul, 7 November 1824, buried in Mihrişah Sultan Mausoleum, Eyüp), married with issue;
- Hatice Sultan (Topkapı Palace, 14 June 1768 – Istanbul, 17 July 1822, buried in Mihrişah Sultan Mausoleum, Eyüp), married with issue;

== See also ==
- Ottoman Imperial Harem
- List of consorts of the Ottoman sultans

== Sources ==
- Uluçay, Mustafa Çağatay (2011). Padişahların kadınları ve kızları. Ankara, Ötüken.
- Sakaoğlu, Necdet (2008). Bu mülkün kadın sultanları: Vâlide sultanlar, hâtunlar, hasekiler, kadınefendiler, sultanefendiler. Oğlak Yayıncılık. ISBN 978-9-753-29623-6.
- Kala, Eyüp (2019). OSMANLI DÖNEMİ HANIM SULTAN VAKIFLARI VE SOSYAL POLİTİKA UYGULAMALARI.
- Eyice, Semavi (2011). İstanbul'un Ortadan Kalkan Bazi Tarihi Eserleri.
