= Alev Alatlı =

Turkish author and academic (1944–2024)

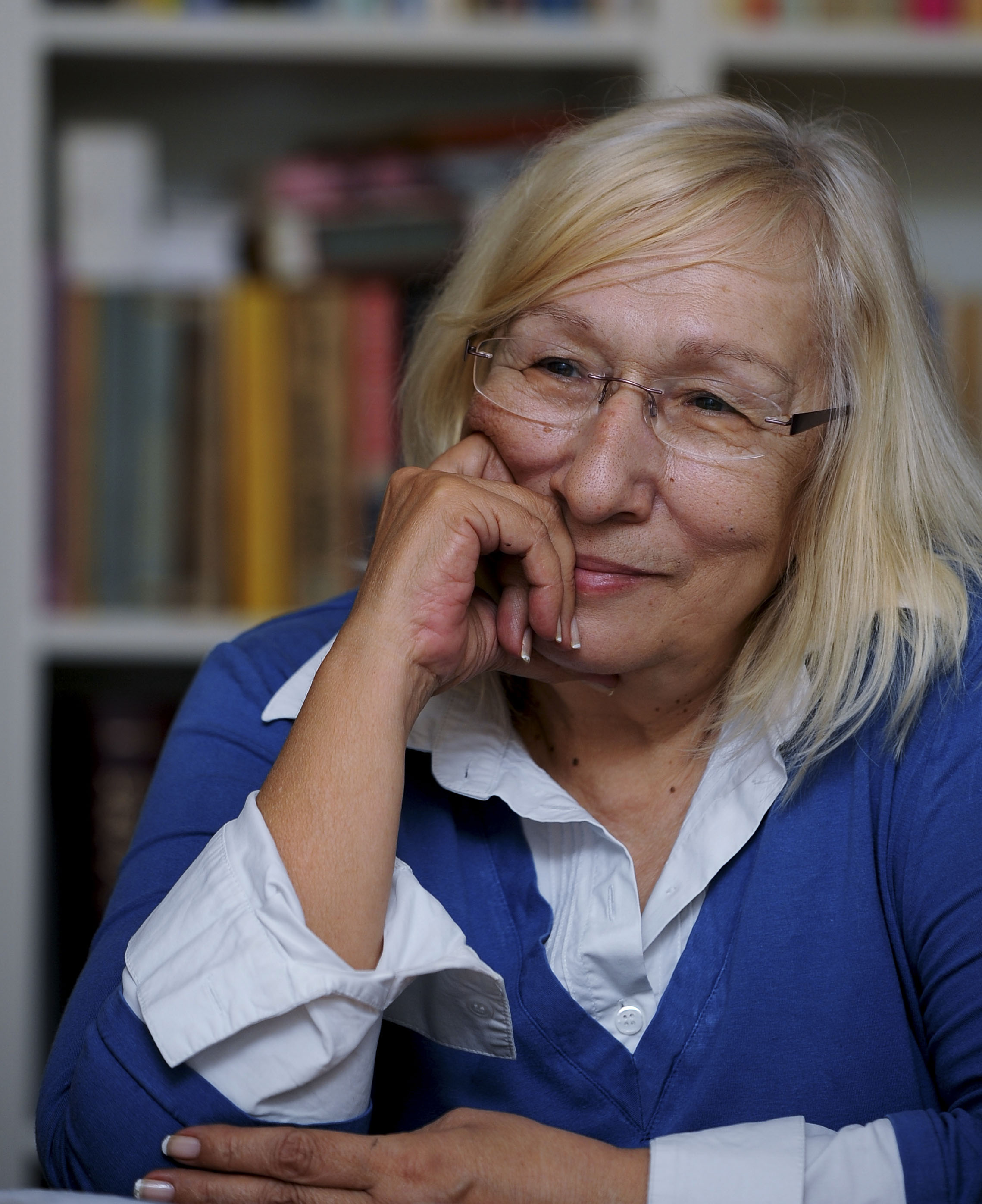
- Alatlı in 2009
- Born: 16 September 1944; Menemen, İzmir, Turkey
- Died: 2 February 2024 (aged 79); Istanbul, Turkey
- Resting place: Mihrişah Sultan Complex, Istanbul
- Education: American School in Japan; Middle East Technical University (BS); Vanderbilt University (MA)
- Occupations: Novelist; academic; economist
- Spouse: Alper Orhon (m. 1963; div. 2001)
- Children: 2
- Writing career
- Years active: 1968–2023
- Genre: Novel
- Notable awards: Presidential Culture and Arts Grand Award (2014)
- Website: www.alevalatli.com.tr

Alev Alatlı (16 September 1944 – 2 February 2024) was a Turkish columnist, bestselling novelist, academic and economist.

== Early years ==
Alev Alatlı was born on 16 September 1944 in the town of Menemen, İzmir to a military officer's family. She spent her childhood in Japan, where her father was appointed as the Military attaché in the Embassy of Turkey and also as the liaison officer of the Turkish Brigade in Korea to the United Nations.

Alatlı attended the American School in Japan in Nakameguro, Tokyo. After finishing high school there, her family returned to Turkey, and Alev studied economics at the Middle East Technical University in Ankara, graduating in 1963 with a Bachelor of Science degree.

Following graduation, she married her classmate Alper Orhon, a Turkish Cypriot. She was granted a Fulbright Scholarship and her husband a scholarship from the Ford Foundation to conduct postgraduate study in the USA. Educated at Vanderbilt University in Nashville, Tennessee, she earned a Master of Arts in Development Economics and Econometrics.

By this time, she had started to think about the importance of formulas and figures in explaining the world, and decided to pursue studies in philosophy. Although she enrolled at Dartmouth College in New Hampshire for doctoral studies on philosophy of religion and philosophy of history she didn't have a Ph.D. degree.

In 1974, Alatlı returned to Turkey. She worked for a while as a lecturer at Istanbul University and later at the State Planning Organization (DPT) in Ankara in her capacity as an economist.

In the next five years after her return from the US, Alev Alatlı spent her time mainly in studying Islam. She was also involved in a psycholinguistic project of the University of California, Berkeley on language learning patterns of Turkish children. She published a magazine titled "Bizim İngilizce" (English: Our English Language) in co-operation with the newspaper Cumhuriyet for Turks based on native tongue and culture.

== Career ==
In 1982, Alatlı quit other activities to stay at home and to devote herself to writing. Her first book titled "Aydın Despotizmi..." (Despotism of the Intellectuals...) was a philosophical study.

Alatlı's next work and first novel "Yaseminler Tüter mi Hala?" (Are Jasmines Still Smoking?) appeared in 1985. It was inspired by the true story of a Greek Cypriot woman. Born and christened at the Apostolos Andreas Monastery on the Karpas Peninsula of Cyprus, she dies in a tragic manner at 32 in Piraeus, Greece, after two marriages – one with a Muslim Turkish Cypriot, the other with an Orthodox Greek – and five children.

Alatlı's next works were two translations into Turkish of books by Edward Said titled "Covering Islam" (Haberlerin Ağında Islam) and "The Question of Palestine" (Filistin’in Sorunu), for which she was awarded with an honorary medal by Yaser Arafat.

Her novella "İşkenceci" (The Torturer), published in 1987, served as a prelude to her next four novels Viva la Muerte! - Yaşasın Ölüm! in 1992, ’Nuke’ Türkiye! (Nuke Turkey) in 1993, Valla, Kurda Yedirdin Beni! (You Sure Made Me Prey to the Wolves) in 1993 and O.K. Musti! Türkiye Tamamdır. (OK Mustafa, Turkey's Done!) in 1994.

The highly realistic novel "Kadere Karşı Koy A.Ş." (Format Your Fate Formidably, Inc.), another bestseller by Alatlı, followed in 1995.

Alatlı's first poetry book "Eylül '98" (September 1998) came out in 1999.

Alatlı wrote two futuristic books, "Kabus" (The Nightmare) in 1999 and "Rüya" (The Dream) in 2000 comprising "Schrodinger's Cat".

Alatlı's next novels "Grace over Enlightenment", "World Sentry" and "Eyy Uhnem! Eyy Uhnem!" are the first three books of a four-volume work on Russia called "Gogol'un İzinde" (In Gogol's Footsteps). In 2006, she was awarded the "Mikhail Aleksandrovich Sholokhov 100th Anniversary Novel Award" for her third novel in the series.

From 2002, she wrote bi-weekly a column in the right-wing Gülenist newspaper Zaman. In February 2008, an article of her on the women's Islamic headgear turban was not allowed to be published by the newspaper's editor-in-chief with the argument "our readers are not ready for that". A book published in 2003 under the title "Şimdi Değilse, Ne Zaman?" (If not now, when?) brought out a collection of her articles that had appeared in the newspaper Zaman.

== Death ==
Alatlı died in Istanbul on 2 February 2024, at the age of 79. She was buried at the Mihrişah Sultan Complex following the religious service held at Eyüp Sultan Mosque attended by high-ranked politicians.

== Books ==
=== Novels ===
- Aydın Despotizmi..., Alfa Basım Yayım Dağıtım (1982)
- Yaseminler Tüter mi Hala?, Everest Yayınları (1985)
- İşkenceci (1987)
- Viva la Muerte! - Yaşasın Ölüm! - Or'da Kimse Var mı? 1. Kitap, Everest Yayınları (1992)
- ’Nuke’ Türkiye!- Or'da Kimse Var mı? 2. Kitap, Everest Yayınları (1993)
- Valla, Kurda Yedirdin Beni! - Or'da Kimse Var mı? 3. Kitap, Everest Yayınları (1993)
- O.K. Musti! Türkiye Tamamdır. - Or'da Kimse Var mı? 4. Kitap, Alfa Basım Yayım Dağıtım (1994)
- Kabus - Schrödinger'in Kedisi 1. Kitap, Everest Yayınları (1999)
- Rüya - Schrödinger'in Kedisi 2. Kitap, Everest Yayınları (2000)
- Aydınlanma Değil, Merhamet! - Gogol'ün İzinde 1. Kitap, Everest Yayınları (2004)
- Dünya Nöbeti - Gogol'ün İzinde 2. Kitap, Everest Yayınları (2005)
- Eyy Uhnem! Eyy Uhnem! - Gogol'ün İzinde 3. Kitap, Everest Yayınları (2006)
- Hollywood'u Kapattığım Gün, Everest Yayınları (2009) 360 pp., ISBN 978-975-289-600-0
- Aklın Yolu da Bir Değildir... , Destek Yayınları (2009) 176 pp., ISBN 978-9944-2-9831-5
- Beyaz Türkler Küstüler - Or'da Hâlâ Kimse Var mı? 5. Kitap, Everest Yayınları (2013) 460 pp., ISBN 9786051416366

=== Non-fiction ===
- Şimdi Değilse, Ne zaman?, Zaman Kitap (2003) 268 pp., ISBN 975-8578-23-5
- 'Hayır!' Diyebilmeli İnsan, Zaman Kitap (2005) 182 pp., ISBN 975-8578-71-5

=== Poems ===
- Eylül '98 (September 1998)

=== Translations ===
- Haberlerin Ağında İslam (1985)
- Filistin’in Sorunu (1986)
- En Emin Yol "Akvem ül-Mesalik’li Marifat Ahval el-Memalik" Tunuslu Hayreddin Paşa (1986)

=== Theater plays ===
Kadere Karşı Koy A.Ş. (2002)
