= American School in Japan =

Coordinates: 35°40′51″N 139°31′17″E

The American School in Japan
- アメリカンスクール・イン・ジャパン

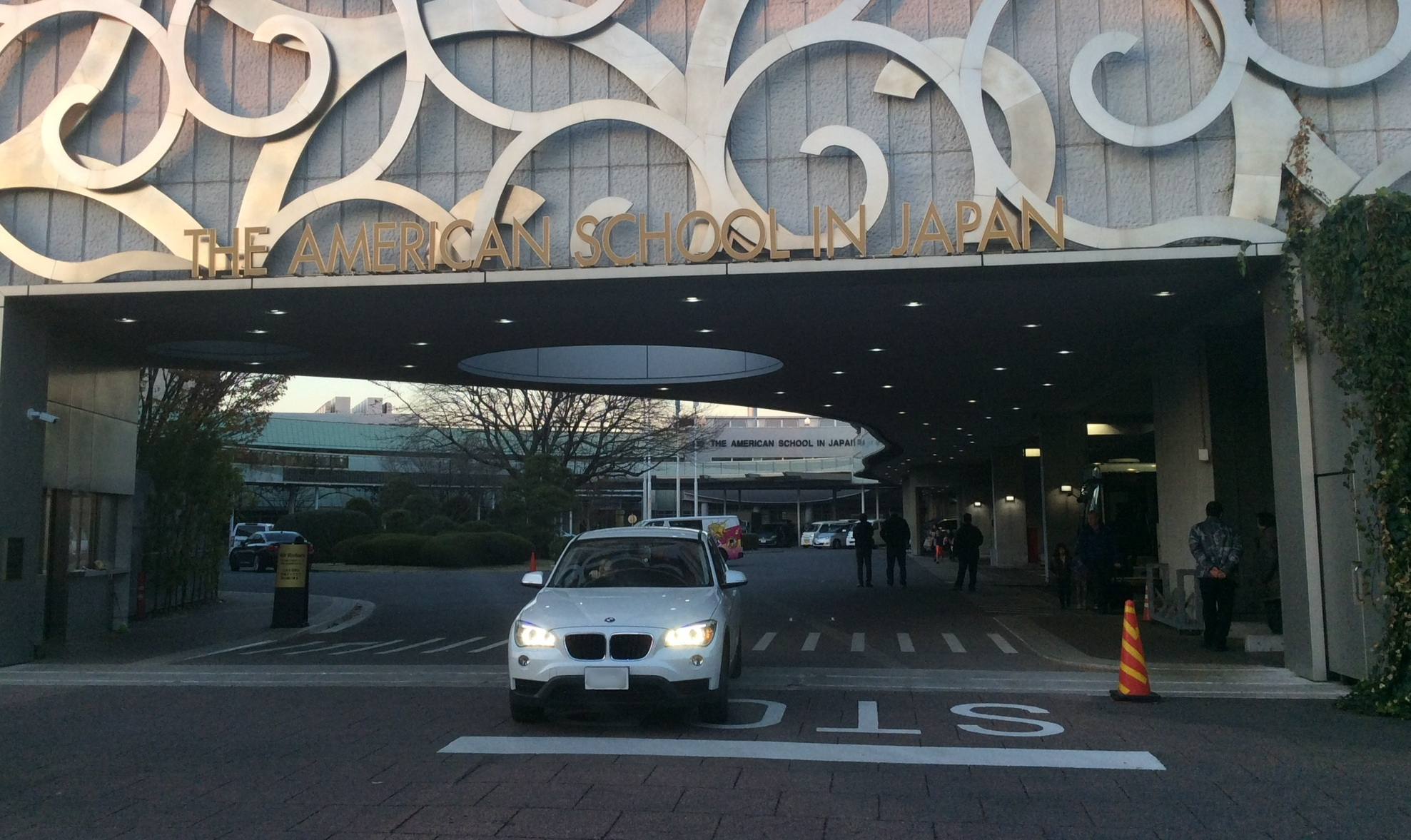
- Chōfu, Tokyo, Japan; Japan

Information
- Type: Private
- Motto: Fostering a community of inquisitive learners and independent thinkers, inspired to be their best selves, empowered to make a difference
- Established: 1902
- Head of school: Eric F Niles
- Grades: Pre-K to 12
- Enrollment: 1647
- Mascot: Mustang
- Accreditation: WASC
- Affiliation: none
- Website: www.asij.ac.jp

The American School in Japan (ASIJ; Japanese: アメリカンスクール・イン・ジャパン) is an international private day school located in the city of Chōfu, Tokyo, Japan. The school consists of an elementary school, a middle school, and a high school, all located on the Chōfu campus. There is also an early learning center (nursery-kindergarten) for children aged 3–5 located in the Roppongi Hills complex in downtown Tokyo. Instruction is in English and follows an American-style curriculum. About two thirds of the school's students are the children of citizens of a wide variety of countries who are on temporary assignment in Japan, and the remaining one third are Japanese students who speak English.

== History ==
Officially founded in 1902, The American School in Japan was started by a group of women who recognized the need for a school among the growing foreign community. Beginning life in rented rooms in the Kanda YMCA, the Tokyo School for Foreign Children, as it was then known, quickly attracted a growing numbers of students from around the world and soon needed to move to a more permanent home in Tsukiji. In 1921, the school moved to a new 3 story building in Shibaura. The building was deemed unsafe after the Great Kanto earthquake, and classes resumed on the Friends Mission compound in Shiba, in the former home of the Bowles family.

In the early 1920s Frank Lloyd Wright, who was in Tokyo building the Imperial Hotel, drew designs for a proposed new campus, as did Antonin Raymond. Although neither of the designs were constructed, Raymond assisted in the move and repurposing of some buildings when the school moved to Nakameguro in 1927. In 1933, local expatriate architect William Merrell Vories was asked to design and build a new main concrete building for the campus, which was completed in 1934. After closing during the war years, the school reopened in 1946. The current campus in Chofu was opened in 1963.

A series of major improvements to the main campus began in the late 1990s, with seismic updates, a new elementary school gym, and an expansion to the high school which included a redesigned entrance. A new cafeteria building with classrooms and administrative offices on the second and third floors opened in 2003. In 2004, the school's Early Learning Center opened in Roppongi Hills, moving from Nakameguro. A new theater complex opened in 2005. Between 2006 and 2009, athletic fields and playgrounds were upgraded and solar panels were installed. Between 2010 and 2013, a series of changes designed by Paul Tange addressed campus traffic flow, added new athletic facilities (including raised tennis courts with covered bus drop-off below, and replaced the Multipurpose Room, along with the Elementary music and art classrooms with the CADC (Creative Art Design Center) which not only houses the music and art classrooms, but also houses multiple rooms for the high school and middle school Design Technology classes, a Japanese Culture center, and holds multiple meeting rooms.

=== Jack Moyer sexual abuse ===
In March 2014, the school publicly announced that a teacher, Jack Moyer, had sexually abused students during his tenure from 1963~1988. He also continued to be involved in the school's 7th grade Miyake outdoor program until 2002, when the erupting island volcano ended that locale for the program. The school stated that the current administration and board had found out about this abuse in November 2013. However, victims of Moyer allege that past administrators were informed as far back as 1968. The school says that it has no record of this earlier reporting. Moyer committed suicide in 2004. Alumni called on the school to commission an independent investigation into a possible years-long cover-up by the school's administration over the abuse allegations. The school announced on 4 June 2014 that it had contracted the law firm Ropes & Gray to conduct an independent investigation into the allegations against Moyer and how ASIJ responded to the allegations.

In June 2015, the ASIJ Board of Directors released a letter admitting that an independent investigation found that Jack Moyer's abuse of students was extensive and that the abuse was covered up by faculty and administrators for years. The board apologized for the harm this has caused and promised to release the report in English and Japanese by mid-June, 2015. The full report, released by Ropes & Gray LLP on June 15, 2015, concluded "[i]n light of all of the evidence we have examined, it is apparent to us that Moyer was a serial pedophile who, in our assessment, sexually abused female ASIJ students". Lawyers for 13 of the victims also released their report on June 15, 2015.

== Curriculum ==
ASIJ follows a broadly American curriculum and Advanced Placement courses are offered for high school sophomores, juniors and seniors. There is a Japanese language program, which begins in the first grade. Other languages taught are Spanish and Chinese. All the students in the Elementary School must learn Japanese for one period every other day.

The Early Learning Center's philosophy is heavily influenced by the Reggio Emilia Approach and the curriculum is project based. The elementary school uses the Columbia Writing Program and Everyday Math program in addition to curriculum units developed by faculty. In 2011, ASIJ joined Global Online Academy, a consortium of leading independent schools that offers courses taught by consortium member teachers to member school students. GOA courses are designed to give students an opportunity to offer their local perspective to global issues.

== Environmental sustainability ==
Reflective paint on building roofs, reflective film on windows, and the installation of more double pane windows and LED lighting were largely accomplished in 2008. In 2009, with the help of government funding and private and corporate donors, the school installed solar panels on top of the gym and pool buildings which have a maximum capacity of 80 kWh. ASIJ also promotes energy conservation each year by not turning on the heat or air-conditioning during October and April, aka NO HEAT-NO COOL months, and has reduced PET bottle consumption by promoting the use of water bottles such as SIGG and replaced regular PET bottles in vending machines with Coca-Cola's I Lohas bottles.

== Notable alumni ==
- Alev Alatlı, Turkish economist, columnist and bestselling novelist
- Thelma Aoyama, Japanese pop and R&B singer
- Agnes Chan, Japanese singer, television personality, university professor
- John Cornyn, American politician
- Bobak Ferdowsi, NASA flight engineer
- Norma Field, author
- Joan Fontaine, British-American actress
- Beate Sirota Gordon, American performing arts presenter and women's rights advocate
- Yu Hayami, Japanese singer
- Ernest Higa, entrepreneur
- Kaz Hirai, Japanese businessman
- Joi Ito, Japanese businessman
- Mizuko Ito, Japanese cultural anthropologist
- Lisa (Japanese musician, born 1974), Japanese singer
- Lois Lowry, American writer
- Daryl F. Mallett, American author, editor and publisher
- May J., Japanese singer
- Saori Minami, Japanese retired J-pop singer-songwriter
- Hikaru Nishida, Japanese singer
- Judy Ongg, Taiwanese-Japanese singer, actress, author, and woodblock-print artist
- Vladimir Ossipoff, American architect
- Rudolph Pariser, physical and polymer chemist
- Oliver Platt, Canadian-born American actor
- Linda Purl, American actress and singer
- Edwin O. Reischauer, American diplomat, educator, and professor at Harvard University
- Haru M. Reischauer, Japanese-American writer
- Frederik L. Schodt, American translator, interpreter and writer
- Steven Smith (astronaut), American astronaut
- Norman Tindale, Australian anthropologist, archaeologist, entomologist and ethnologist
- Oleg Troyanovsky, ambassador
- Hikaru Utada, Japanese-American pop singer
- Oswald Wynd, Scottish writer

== See also ==
- List of high schools in Tokyo
- List of Japanese international schools in the United States
- Americans in Japan
