= Antoine Ignace Melling =

French painter

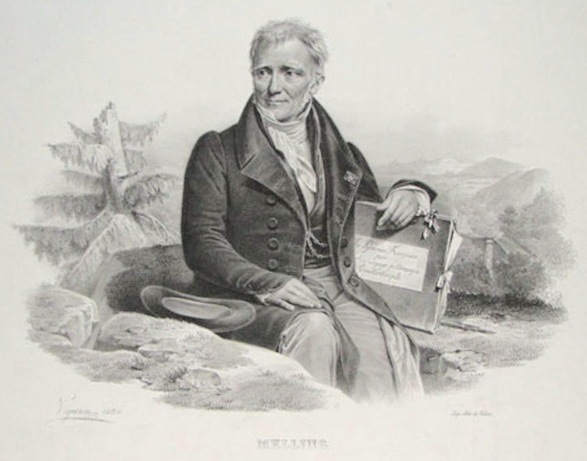
Antoine-Ignace Melling, in 1830, by Pierre-Roch Vigneron

Antoine Ignace Melling (27 April 1763 – November 1831) was a painter, architect and voyager who is counted among the “Levantine Artists”. He is famous for his vedute of Constantinople, a town where he lived for 18 years. He was imperial architect to Sultan Selim III and Hatice Sultan and later landscape painter to the Empress Josephine of France. His most influential work is published as Voyage pittoresque de Constantinople et des rives du Bosphore.

Melling's two given names are often written in hyphenated form as Antoine-Ignace.

== Biography ==
Melling was born Anton Ignaz Melling in Karlsruhe, Baden, in 1763. After the death of his sculptor father, he lived with his painter uncle, Joseph Melling, in Strassbourg (Alsace). As a young man he visited his older brother, and studied Architecture and Mathematics at Klagenfurt. At the age of 19, he went to Italy, Egypt, and finally Constantinople as a member of the Russian Ambassador's retinue and household with the aim of drawing pictures for various dignitaries. He was introduced to princess Hatice Sultan, sister and confidant of the Ottoman Sultan Selim III.

At Hatice Sultan's suggestion, Melling was employed as Imperial Architect by Selim III. In 1795 the princess commissioned Melling to design a labyrinth for her palace at Ortaköy in the style of the Danish ambassador Baron Hübsch's garden. Delighted with the result, she asked Melling to redecorate the palace interior, and subsequently, a completely new neoclassical palace at Defterdarburnu. He also designed clothes and jewellery for her.

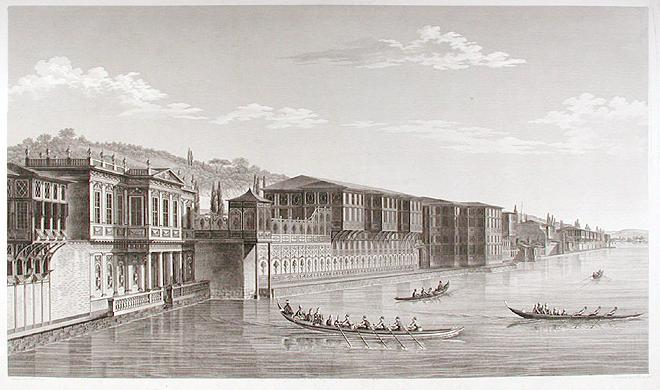
Engraving of Hatice Sultan Palace by Melling, about 1800

Melling Pasha's eighteen years as Imperial Architect gave him a privileged opportunity to observe the Ottoman Court. He became more familiar with the Ottoman palace than any Western artist since Gentile Bellini. He made many detailed drawings of the Sultan's palaces, Ottoman society, and vedute of Constantinople and its environs. He was rightly known as "the unrivalled painter of the Bosphorus". As stated in an anonymous travelogue written in about 1817, "Sometimes these pictures contain an excessive amount of detail in an endeavour to reflect the reality but they depict the modern buildings and landscapes of this city, every view of which is attractive, in a manner more successful than that achieved in the most sensitive written descriptions." He worked in a far more realistic manner than Matthäus Merian (1593–1650). Merian's panorama engraving of Constantinople, published in 1653 and extensively reprinted, whilst claiming to represent the view of the city from the heights of Galata and Beyoğlu, depicts Ottoman capital as a city consisting only of minarets.

== Paris ==
He went to Paris in 1803, and published a prospectus for the Voyage pittoresque de Constantinople et des rives du Bosphore. With the help of Talleyrand Melling was appointed landscape painter to the Emperor Napoleon's wife, the Empress Josephine. By 1809 he had set up an engraving studio for the purpose of reproducing completed images of his drawings. A series of facsimiles were sent out to subscribers, between 1809 and 1819. Examples of etchings with engraving by Schroeder, Duplessi-Bertaux, and Pigeot after Melling, with later professional hand-colouring, include:

- Cérémonie d'une noce turque.
- Fontaine de Sari-Yéri, près de Buyuk-Déré.
- Intérieur d'une partie du Harem du Grand-Seigneur.
- Kiâhd-Hané, Lieu de Plaisance du Grand-Seigneur.
- Prairie de Buyuk-Déré; Sur la Rive Européenne du Bosphore, à quatre lieues de Constantinople.
- Vue de l'un des Bend, dans la forêt de Belgrade.
- Vue d'Aïnali-Kavak près de l'Arsenal, dans l'intérieur du port de Constantinople.
- Vue d'une partie de la Ville de Constantinople, avec la pointe du Sérail, Prise du Faubourg de Péra, Résidence des Ministres Etrangers.
- Vue de Hounkiar-Iskelesi, Échelle du Grand-Seigneur.
- Vue de Kara-Aghatch, au fond du port.
- Vue de l'embouchure de la mer Noire.
- Vue de l'Isle de Ténédos, dans l'Archipel.
- Vue de la grande Arcade de l'aqueduc de Baktché-Kieuï, et du vallon de Buyuk-Dèrè.
- Vue de la partie Orientale de Buyuk-Dèrè, Sur la Rive Européenne du Bosphore.
- Vue de la première cour de sérail.
- Vue de la Seconde Cour Intérieure du Sérail.
- Vue de la Ville de Scutari, prise à Péra.
- Vue du Champ des Morts, près de Péra.
- Vue du château des Sept-Tours, et de la ville de Constantinople, telle qu'elle se présente du côté de la mer de Marmara.
- Vue du grand Bend, dans la forêt de Belgrade.
- Vue du Village Tarapia, sur la rive européenne du Bosphore.
- Vue générale de Constantinople, prise du chemin de Buyuk-Déré.

== Travels ==
His 1812 journey to the Netherlands (under French rule at the time) is documented by Melling not only by a large number of surviving drawings but also by the letters sent to his family in Paris. The joys and inconveniences of that journey, which took him as far as the Hanseatic towns, are reported in a lively style, as are various aspects of Dutch life, the monuments and inhabitants of large cities, like Rotterdam and Amsterdam, and the "overwhelming appeal" of villages such as Broek in Waterland and the peaceful Sunday atmosphere of Zwolle. The illustrated and annotated letters, preceded by an introduction – like a travel diary intended for a Voyage pittoresque – were never published. In 1815 he traveled with his daughter, drawing the capitals of all the French départements, and visited Britain in 1817.

After 1821, he was sent by the French Government to document the Pyrenees and demonstrate that their natural beauty rivalled that of the Alps. Seventy-two fine aquatints, based on original sepia watercolours, were issued - together with text by Joseph Antoine Cervini - as Voyage Pittoresque dans les Pyrénées Françaises et les Départements Adjacents (Picturesque Travels in the French Pyrenees and the Adjacent Areas), Treuttel and Wurtz, Paris: 1826–30, (Bibliographie nationale Française, BnF, The French national Bibliography ISBN 2-911715-12-8). Examples of hand-coloured aquatints from this work include:

- Port de Vénasque
- Le Pont d'Espagne
- Le Lac de Gaube
- Vue prise de l'Hôtel Gassion à Pau
- Le Perthus et le Fort de Bellegarde
- Le Lac de Séculejo et ses Cascades
- Grotte du Mas-d'Azil
- Site de la Vallée d'Aure
- Ermitage de Saint-Antoine de Galamus
- Fontestorbes

== Legacy ==
The Nobel Prize-winning Turkish novelist, Orhan Pamuk dedicates a whole chapter to Melling in his autobiographical memoir, Istanbul: Memories and the City. Pamuk claims that Melling saw the city like an Istanbullu but painted it like a cleareyed Westerner.

On the occasion of the 700th anniversary of the foundation of the Ottoman State, correspondence between Antoine Ignace Melling and Hatice Sultan, between 1763 and 1801; was reviewed in a paper by Fréderic Hitzel - at the 1999 International Congress on Learning and Education in the Ottoman World. The International Congress organised by IRCICA in cooperation with the Turkish Historical Society and the Turkish Society for History of Science, with the support of the Ministry of Foreign Affairs of the Republic of Turkey. The congress took place under the patronage and in presence of the President of Turkey. 175 scholars and researchers from 28 countries participated in it. The papers presented - subsequently revised by their authors - are published in three separate volumes: Arabic, (Vol. 1), English, (Vol. 2), and Turkish, (Vol. 3), respectively.

Melling is included in the Sabancı University Faculty of Arts & Social Science course: Major Works of Ottoman Culture, (HUM 203). This course, "focuses on a selected few masterpieces of Ottoman artistic and literary production, picked on the basis of not only their high aesthetic qualities, but also their representativeness across different genres and historical periods".

The Ertuğ & Kocabıyık facsimile edition of the complete Voyage pittoresque de Constantinople et des rives du Bosphor was produced from the original "elephant folio", an unfolded first edition in the collection of Ahmet Ertuğ. The technical aspects of the project were done under the supervision of Ertuğ in Switzerland by facsimile specialists. This facsimile edition was available in two different bindings. One is bound in Japanese cloth and the other is a very limited edition of only 50 copies bound in leather - intended for connoisseurs of fine books. The binding and decoration of all the leather-bound copies were done by hand. The book includes 48 views of Constantinople in the late 18th century and also three maps. The facsimile publishers also offered 25 copies of an edition of the unfolded image plates presented in a leather-bound case. The text for this edition is bound separately and presented in a pocket in the leather case. The descriptions of the views in the facsimile edition are in the original French, with an English translation.

== Sources ==
- Antoine Ignace Melling, Lettres de Hollande et des villes anséatiques. La correspondance d'un artiste-voyageur avec sa famille à Paris en 1812. (Letters from Holland and the Hanseatic towns. Correspondence of an artist-traveller with his family in Paris in 1812). Presented and annotated by C. Boschma, Waanders, Zwolle/Fondation Custodia, Paris-1997.
- Souren Melikian (December 22, 2006). "From Turkey, a new genre in art publishing". International Herald Tribune. Report on the Ertuğ & Kocabıyık facsimile edition of the complete Voyage pittoresque de Constantinople et des rives du Bosphor.
- Voyage pittoresque de Constantinople et des rives du Bosphore,(Paperback, 350 pages), Antoine Ignace Melling, Adamant Media Corporation, (in French), ISBN 0-543-97318-2 ISBN 978-0-543-97318-4.
- Correspondence between Antoine Ignace Melling (1763–1801) and Hatice Sultan, Fréderic Hitzel, Session VII, C. Papers in English (Vol. 2): Proceedings of the International Congress on Learning and Education in the Ottoman World on the Occasion of the 700th Anniversary of the Foundation of the Ottoman State, Istanbul, 12–15 April 1999 in 3 volumes. 2000–2002, IRCICA Publications. ISBN 92-9063-090-6
- Elisabeth A. Fraser, "Miniatures in Black and White: Melling's Istanbul," in Mediterranean Encounters: Artists Between Europe and the Ottoman Empire, 1774-1839, Penn State University Press, 2017. ISBN 978-0-271-07320-0
