= Imaret =

Charitable institution in the Ottoman Empire

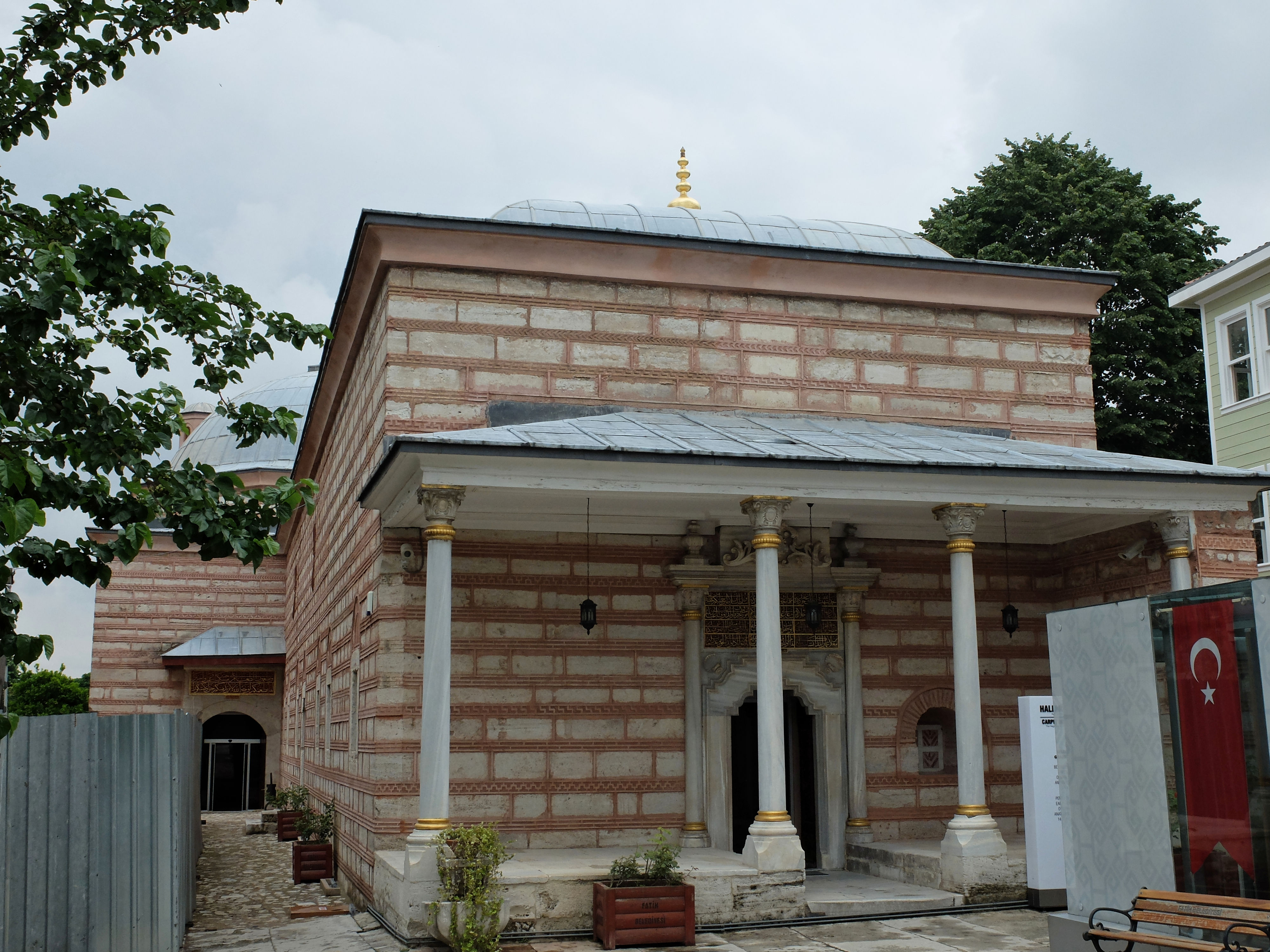
The imaret of the Hagia Sophia complex in Istanbul, built in 1743

Imaret, sometimes also known as a darüzziyafe, is one of several names used to identify the public soup kitchens built throughout the Ottoman Empire from the 14th to the 19th centuries. These public kitchens were often part of a larger complex known as a külliye, which could include hospices, mosques, caravanserais, and colleges. The imarets provided food that was free of charge to specific groups of people and unfortunate individuals. Imarets were not invented by the Ottomans but developed under their rule as highly structured groups of buildings.

== Etymology ==
The Turkish word imaret comes from Arabic 'imāra, which signified "habitation and cultivation" or "the act of building, making habitable". The shift in the word's meaning to denote a religious complex or public kitchen appears to be unique to the Ottoman context.

== History ==
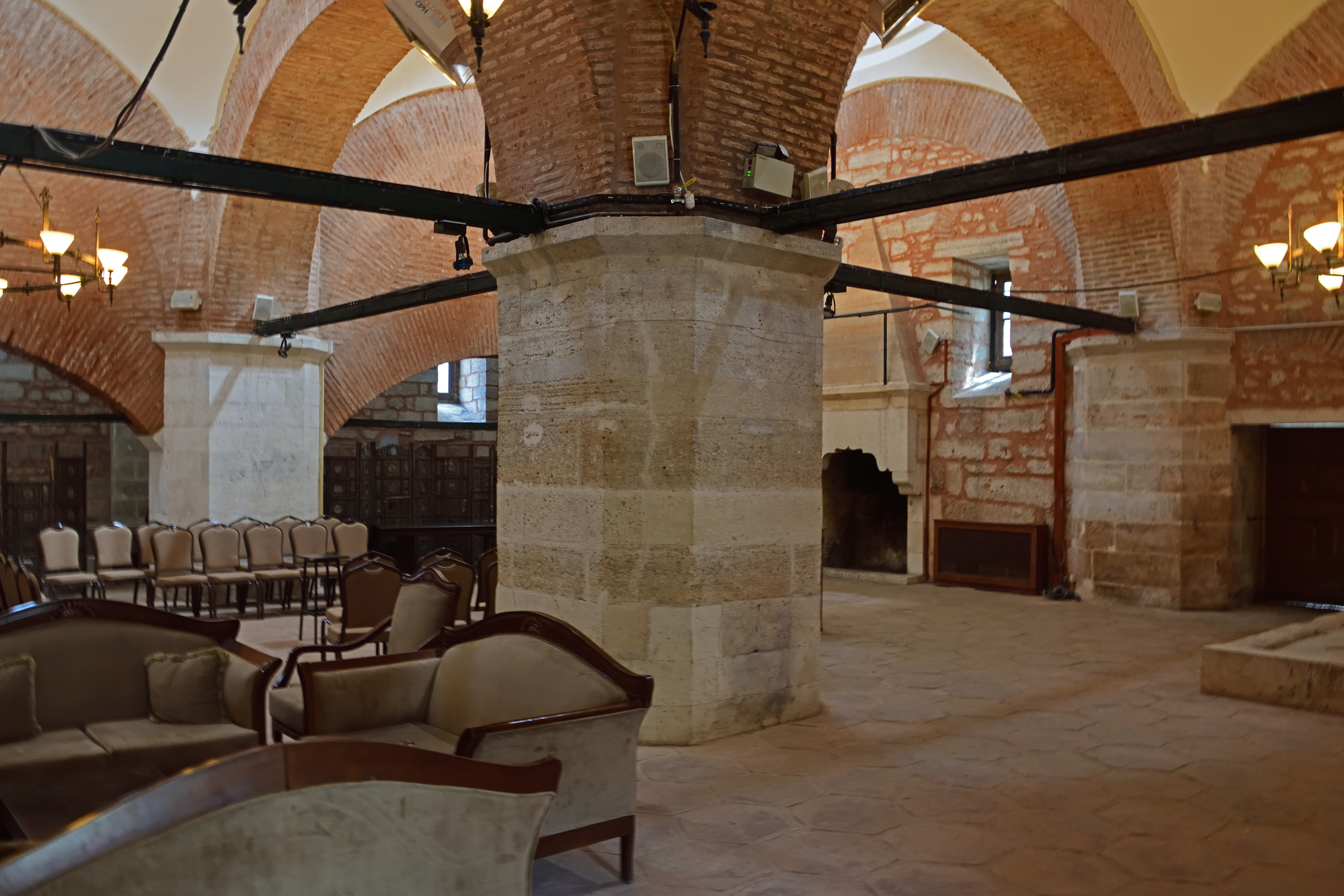
Interior of the imaret of the Şehzade complex in Istanbul (16th century)

According to historian Amy Singer, the imaret is an institution that is "perhaps unique to the Ottomans in its proliferation and purpose." It was found throughout the Ottoman Empire and did not exist in the same manner elsewhere. The distribution of food to the public masses in times of emergency was known in the Middle East before the Ottomans, but the regular distribution of food on a large scale was not. Some exceptions to this existed in certain holy cities, namely Mecca, Medina, and Hebron. In Hebron, the simat al-Khalil ("table of Abraham") was a guesthouse that provided daily food to all visitors to the city, a practice going back centuries and described by the 11th-century writer Nasir Khusraw. Mecca and Medina also had measures in place for the regular distribution of grain since at least the Mamluk period (13th to early 16th centuries). These examples may have inspired later Ottoman rulers.

Doğan Kuban notes that in early Ottoman architecture the term imaret was employed more flexibly to denote an entire religious complex (like a külliye), typically with a zaviye at its center – a religious building that catered to Sufi brotherhoods. This term appears in the original waqf documents of these complexes. The Nilüfer Hatun complex in Iznik, for example, is called an "imaret" but consists of a large zaviye used for Sufi religious activities. In later periods, the term imaret came to denote more strictly a public kitchen. Late Ottoman sources referred to earlier imaret-zaviye buildings as mosques, regardless of what their waqf documents said (also reflecting the fact that many zaviyes had been converted to formal mosques by then).

The first few imarets were built in Iznik and Bursa in the 1330s. Over the following centuries, the number of imarets grew in the cities as the religious complexes founded by the sultans expanded in size. By the 1530s, there were 83 imarets in the Ottoman Empire. Amy Singer estimates there were around 100 imarets by the beginning of the 17th century.

Imarets and other religious complexes served as community centres of their neighbourhoods. Many such complexes were built throughout the Ottoman Empire, but particularly in the central areas of Ottoman rule such as the Balkans (known as Rumelia) and Anatolia, including the capital cities of Bursa, Edirne, and Istanbul. It is estimated that by the end of the 18th century, the imarets in Istanbul were feeding up to 30,000 people a day.

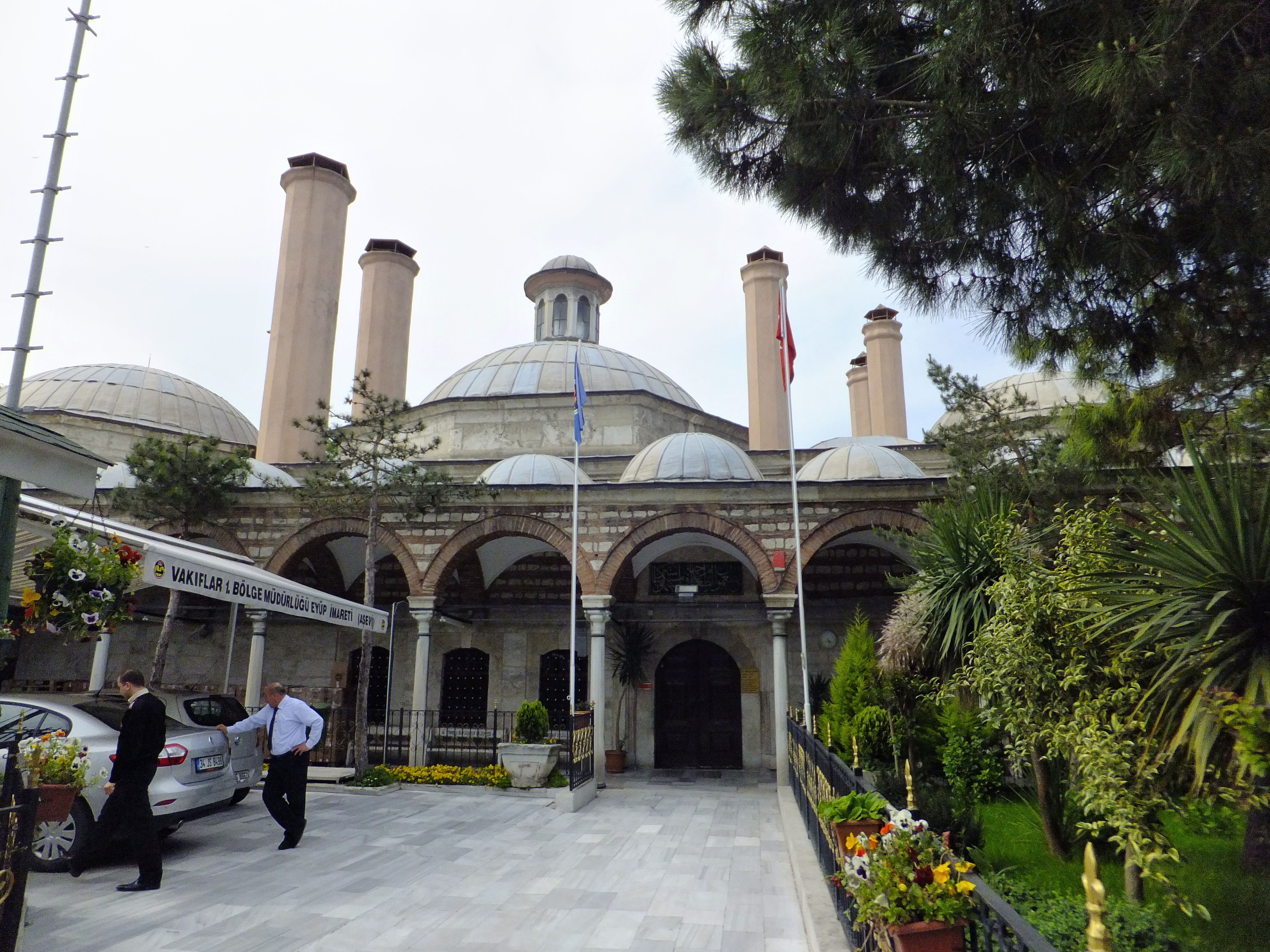
The imaret of the Mihrişah Sultan Complex, completed in 1796 and still operating today

Today, the only Ottoman imaret still serving its original charitable function is the Mihrişah Sultan Complex in the Eyüp neighbourhood of Istanbul, which dates from 1796 and was founded by Mihrişah Sultan, the mother of Sultan Selim III.

== Function ==
=== Charity ===
Imarets served many different types of people and came to be seen as symbols of "charitable and beneficent work". They were philanthropic institutions established as part of voluntary beneficence, which was considered charity under Muslim law. Additionally, the distribution of food itself was seen as a charitable act. Imarets belong to a particular category of voluntary charity, known as sadaqa. Sadaqa as voluntary charity could take many forms, including a prayer or a blessing for the sick and disabled, or a selfless act, all contributed towards good deeds in Ottoman society.

Imarets established by sultans and members of the imperial household were icons of charitable donations as well as imperial power. Each institution was named after its founder, and these places were not able to maintain the direct connection between those who provided charity and those who received it, as was often the case in private homes. The imarets and the imperial household created connections to the Ottoman dynasty as a whole and reinforced the legitimacy of the empire. The public kitchen illustrated how the Ottoman Empire was able to provide benefits for different sectors of people within the empire.

=== Endowment ===
A waqf (vakıf in Turkish) is an "Islamic trust" that was instrumental in establishing imarets and other religious or charitable establishments within the Muslim world. The waqf was a legal mechanism that earmarked sources of revenue to endow mosques, soup kitchens, and hospitals. This enabled the sultan and other wealthy benefactors to fund essential services for citizens.

=== Distribution ===
The importance of food in the imaret underscores the generosity of wealthy individuals who provided for the needs of neighbors, families, and servants. The recipients of food in imarets were categorized by class and profession, with some coming regularly and others as travelers. Despite the open-handed nature of the imarets, they were strictly regulated establishments that carefully monitored the movement of people and the benefits they received. Regulations dictated who could eat, what they could eat, how much they could consume, and in what order.

At the Haseki Sultan Imaret in Jerusalem, employees received one ladle of soup and two loaves of bread, guests received one ladle of soup and one loaf of bread, and the poor and Sufis received half a ladle of soup and one loaf of bread per meal. Meals were served in shifts: employees first, guests second, and the poor last. Sufis had the privilege of sending someone to collect their food on their behalf, while others had to eat within the imaret.

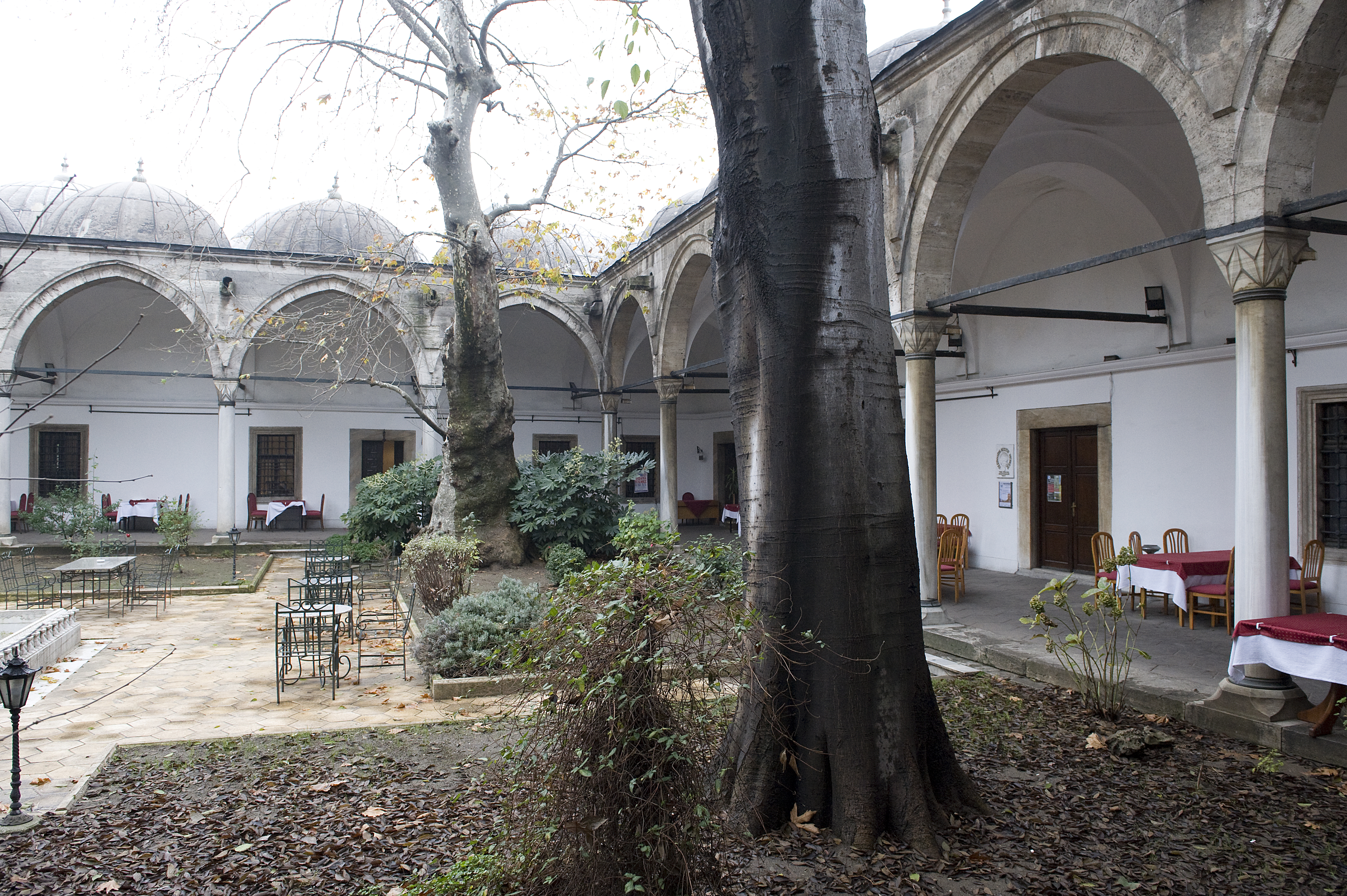
Courtyard of the imaret of the Süleymaniye complex in Istanbul (16th century)

The Süleymaniye complex in Istanbul has strict regulations on removing food from the imaret, but these regulations varied at different imarets. Occasionally, strangers would arrive with buckets to collect food to take home; however, since these individuals were not on the approved list of recipients, they were not allowed to take food. Poor people who were scholars or disabled were exceptions and received food delivered to them. Individuals of low economic status ate with others of the same social class. In addition, because there was such a wide distribution of food to various citizens of the Ottoman Empire, there were times when insufficient food remained after feeding notable individuals. As a result, poor women and children would sometimes go unfed.

== Foods ==
A special menu was prepared for holidays and other special days on the Ottoman calendar. These special meals were based on ceremonial staples that were enjoyed across the empire. On such occasions, everyone was entitled to dishes like dane (mutton and rice) and zerde (rice coloured and flavoured with saffron and sweetened with honey or sugar)." On regular days, the food served in imarets changed seasonally. The morning meal typically consisted of rice soup with butter, chickpeas, onions, and salt. The evening meal consisted of a crushed wheat soup made with butter.

== Notable examples ==
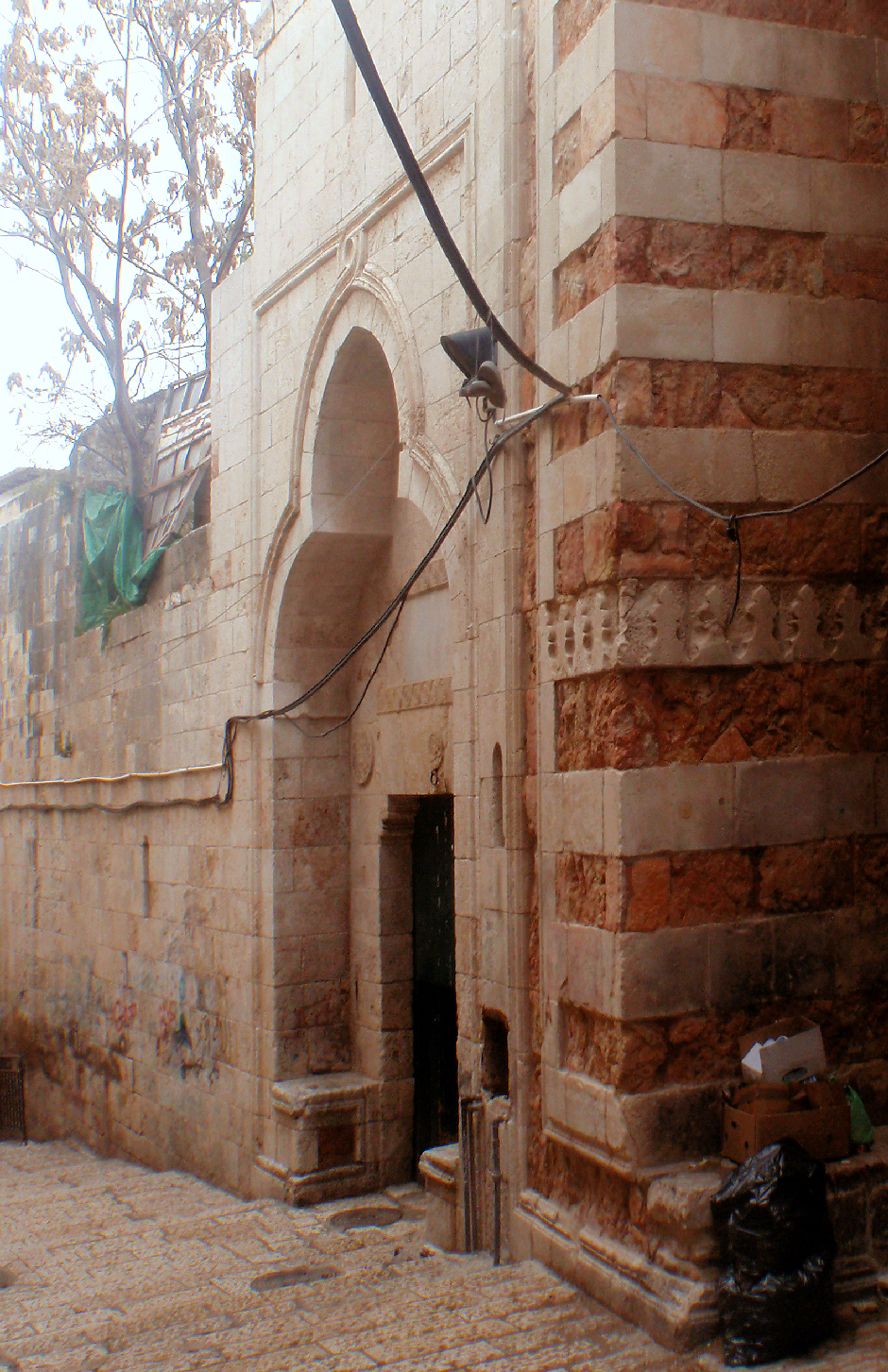
The entrance to Haseki Sultan Imaret in Jerusalem, founded by Hurrem Sultan in 1552

The first institution of this kind is said to have been founded in 1336 by Sultan Orhan I in Iznik, Anatolia. Since then, imarets became an integral part of the urban landscape in most Muslim cities of the Ottoman Empire.

Hurrem Sultan, a wife of Suleiman I, established the Haseki Sultan Imaret in Jerusalem in mid-16th century. This imaret distributed around 1,000 loaves of bread daily. The recipients of bread and soup included employees, residents of the imaret's caravanserai, the followers of a local Sufi shaykh, and 400 people characterized as "poor and wretched, weak and needy." It became one of the largest and best-known imarets throughout the empire, serving a wide variety of people, including the ulama, the poor, pilgrims and wealthy and prominent members of Jerusalem.

Another notable institution was the Fatih Mosque complex in Istanbul, constructed between 1463 and 1471 by Mehmed II the Conqueror. The imaret located within this complex served a diverse group of people including dignitaries, travelers, scholars, and students from the Fatih colleges. Hospital staff and workers of the mosques and tombs were also provided meals. After feeding these groups, any remaining food was given to the poor. Similar to other imarets, the Fatih imaret served rice soup in the morning and wheat soup in the evening. Travellers who stayed overnight at the hotel within the complex received honey and bread to help revitalise them after a long journey. The Fatih complex provided meals for over 160 high-ranking guests. They received dishes such as dane and zerde. These special dishes were given to the other members of the imaret only once a week. Nobles were treated to dishes including pumpkin jam, cinnamon, cloves, and considerable portions of meat and rice.

== See also ==
- Langar (Sikhism)
- Langar (Sufism)
