= Mihrişah Sultan Complex =

Historic building and charitable complex in Istanbul, Turkey

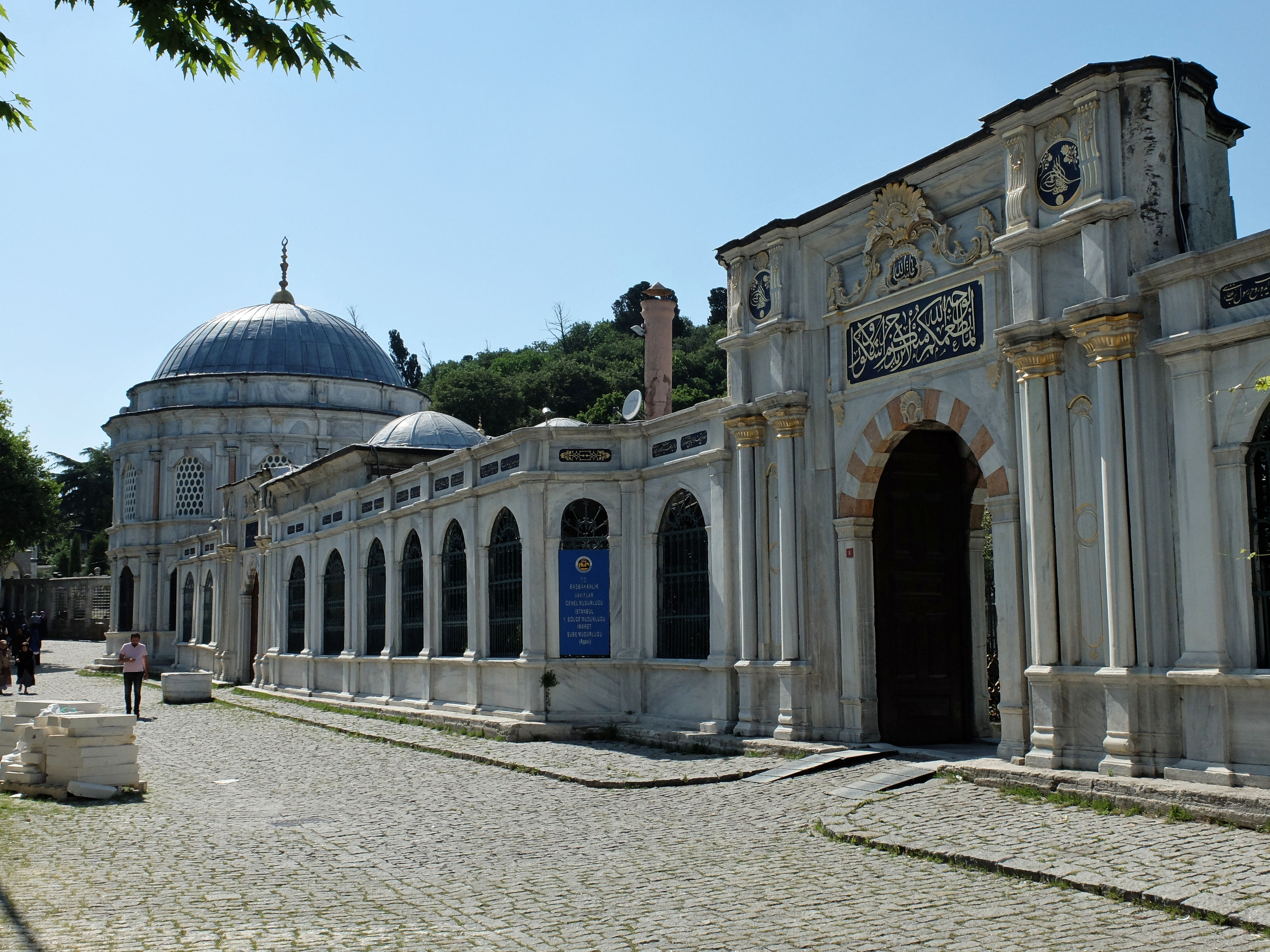
- Mausoleum (left) and main gate (right)
- Interactive map of the Mihrişah Sultan Complex area

General information
- Architectural style: Ottoman Baroque
- Coordinates: 41°02′54.5″N 28°56′4.7″E
- Groundbreaking: 1792
- Completed: 1796

The Mihrişah Sultan Complex (Turkish: Mihrişah Valide Sultan Külliyesi) is an Ottoman architectural complex and charitable foundation (külliye) founded by Mihrişah Sultan in the late 18th century. The complex is located next to the Eyüp Sultan Mosque complex in Istanbul, Turkey. The complex's largest component is an imaret (soup kitchen) which is notable for being one of the last imarets in Istanbul to still serve its original purpose. The rest of the complex is also notable for the founder's mausoleum and for its ornate street-facing sebil, all built in the Ottoman Baroque style.

== Historical background ==
Construction of the complex took place between 1792 and 1796 and was commissioned by Mihrişah Sultan, the mother of Sultan Selim III. The complex is located next to the Eyüp Sultan Mosque in the Eyüp neighbourhood of Istanbul. Selim III's reign (1789–1807) saw renewed Ottoman dynastic interest in this area, as he was responsible for rebuilding the Eyüp Sultan Mosque between 1798 and 1800.

== Architecture ==
The complex consists of a large imaret (soup kitchen) and a mektep (primary school), but from the street its most visible elements are a sebil and Mihrişah Sultan's mausoleum. This urban configuration of the complex was similar to the earlier Hamidiye Complex (partly demolished today) in the Eminönü neighbourhood, which was commissioned by Selim III's predecessor Abdülhamid I. The façade of the Mihrişah Sultan complex, with its vibrantly Baroque sebil and tomb, is one of the most notable exterior façade designs in Ottoman Baroque architecture and one of the grandest Ottoman charitable complexes from this period.

=== Imaret ===
The imaret consists of a large U-shaped building with a garden courtyard in the center, entered via a monumental gate from the street. The courtyard is flanked on three sides by porticos lining the imaret building. The imaret has a traditional design of domed rooms, fireplaces, and openings in and around the dome for ventilation. The mektep is located along a portico on the outer western side of the building. Next to this western portico is a cemetery, from which the mausoleum is accessed. A second, smaller street entrance provides direct access to this area.

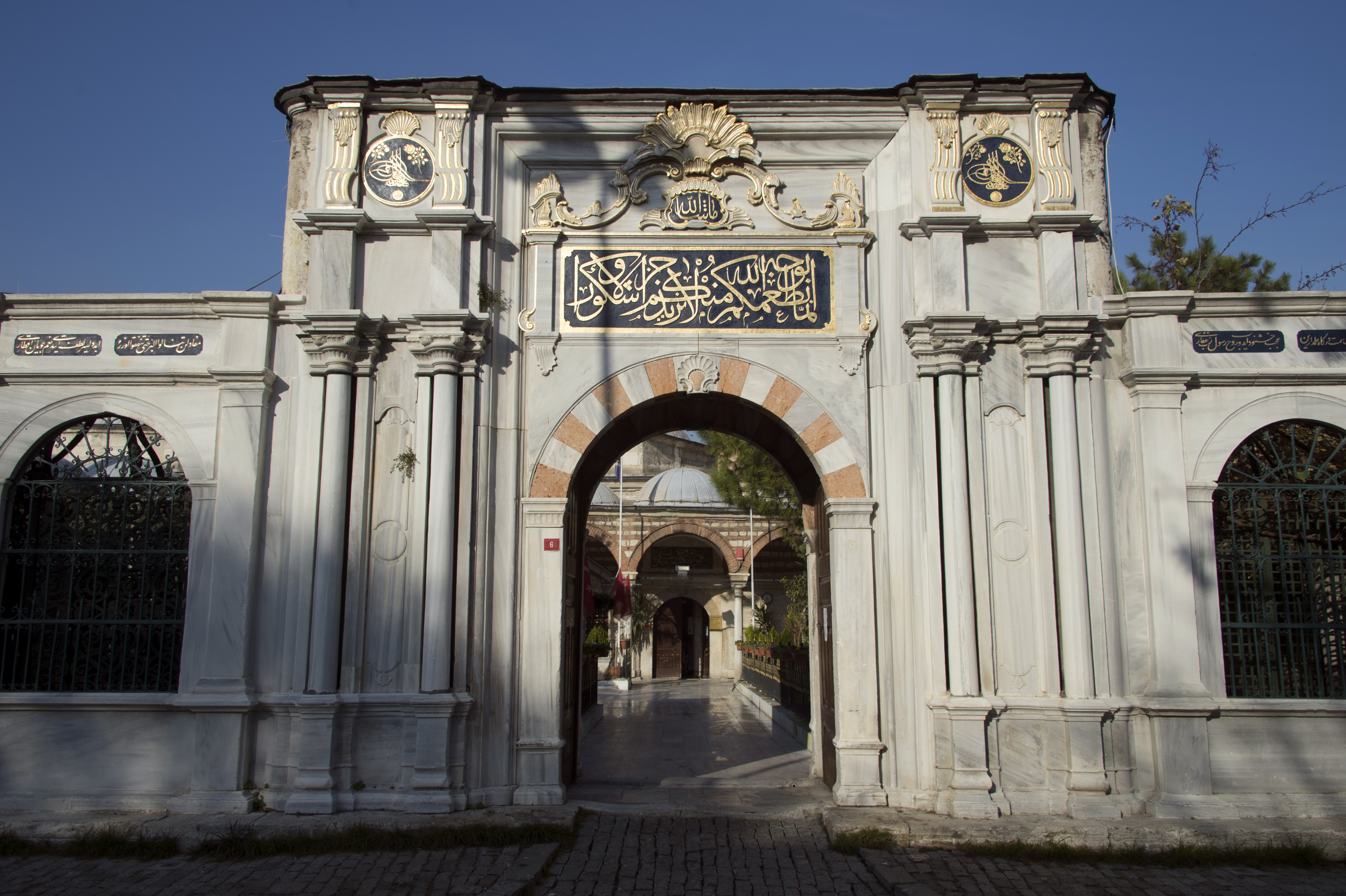
Main gate of the complex, leading to the imaret

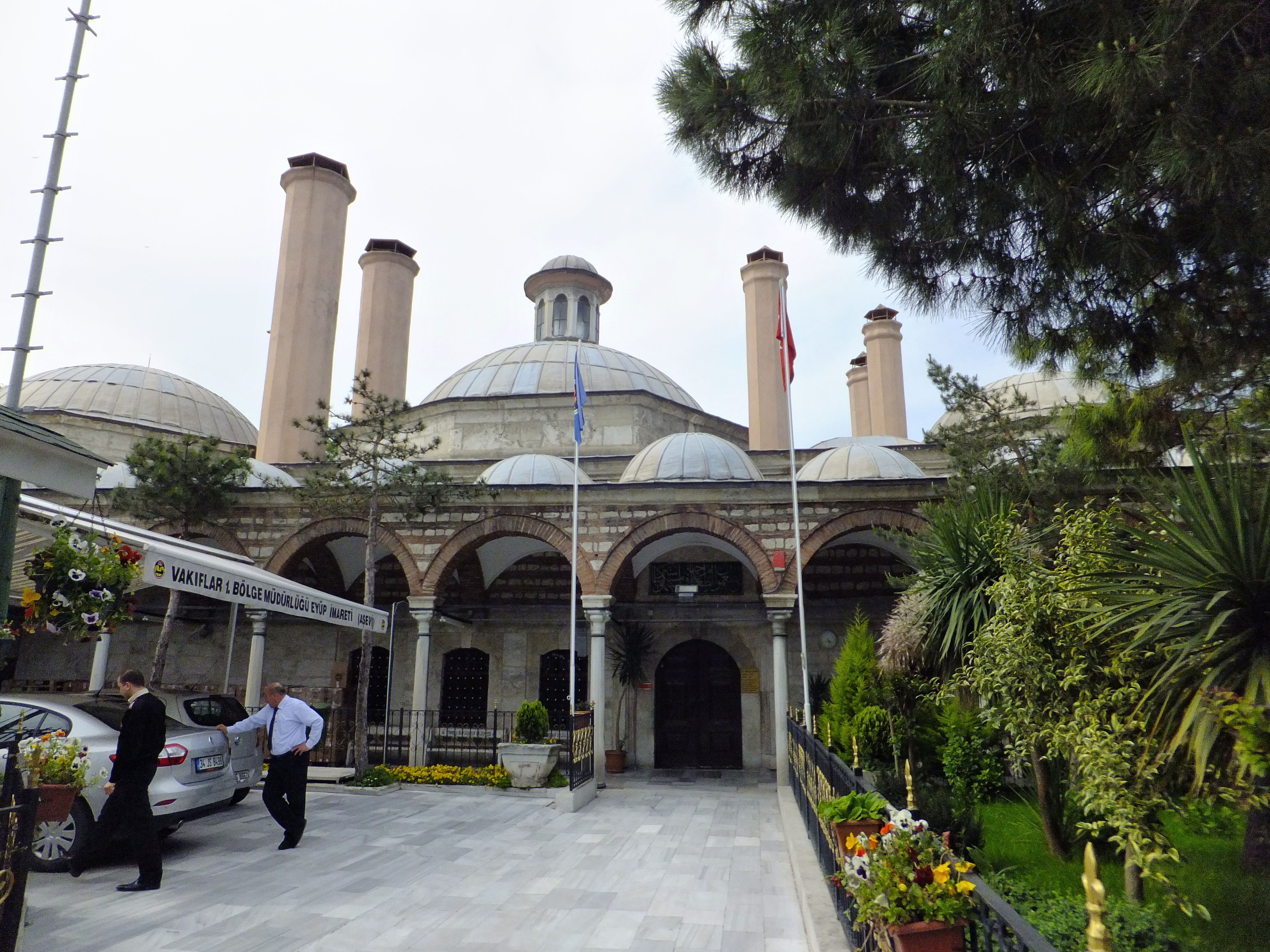
The imaret building, seen from the central courtyard

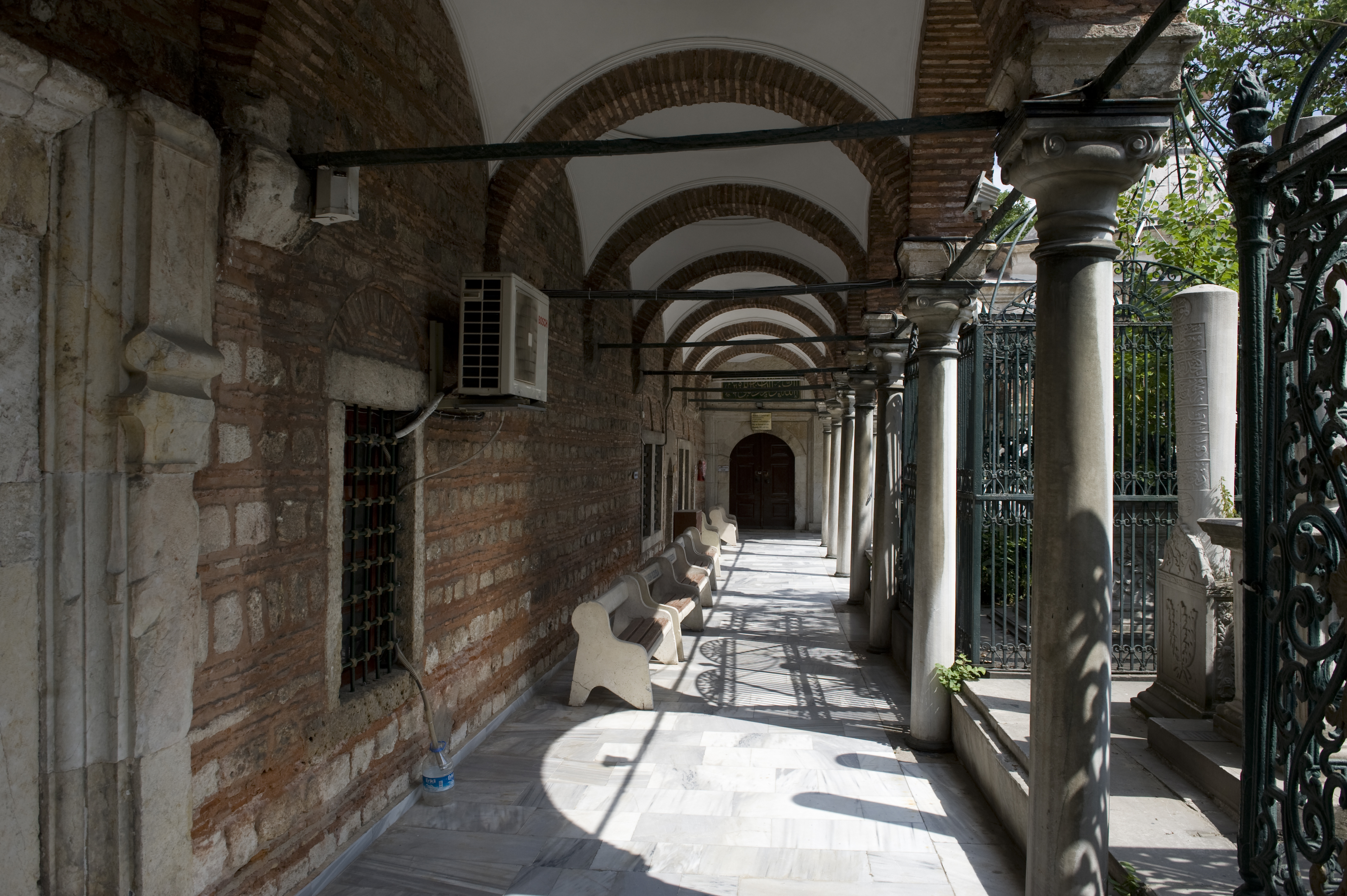
One of the porticos around the courtyard

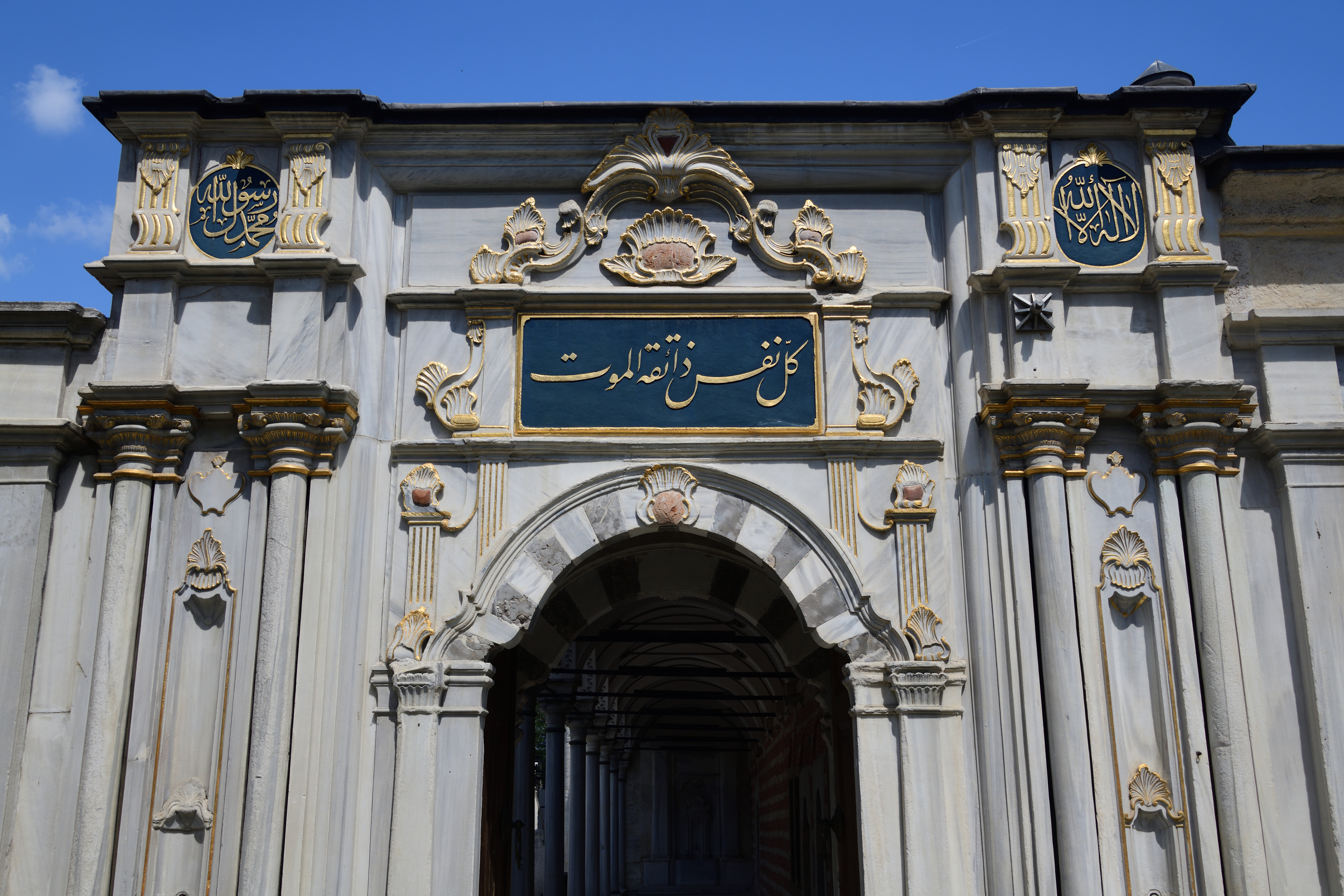
The western gate of the complex, leading to the mektep and the cemetery

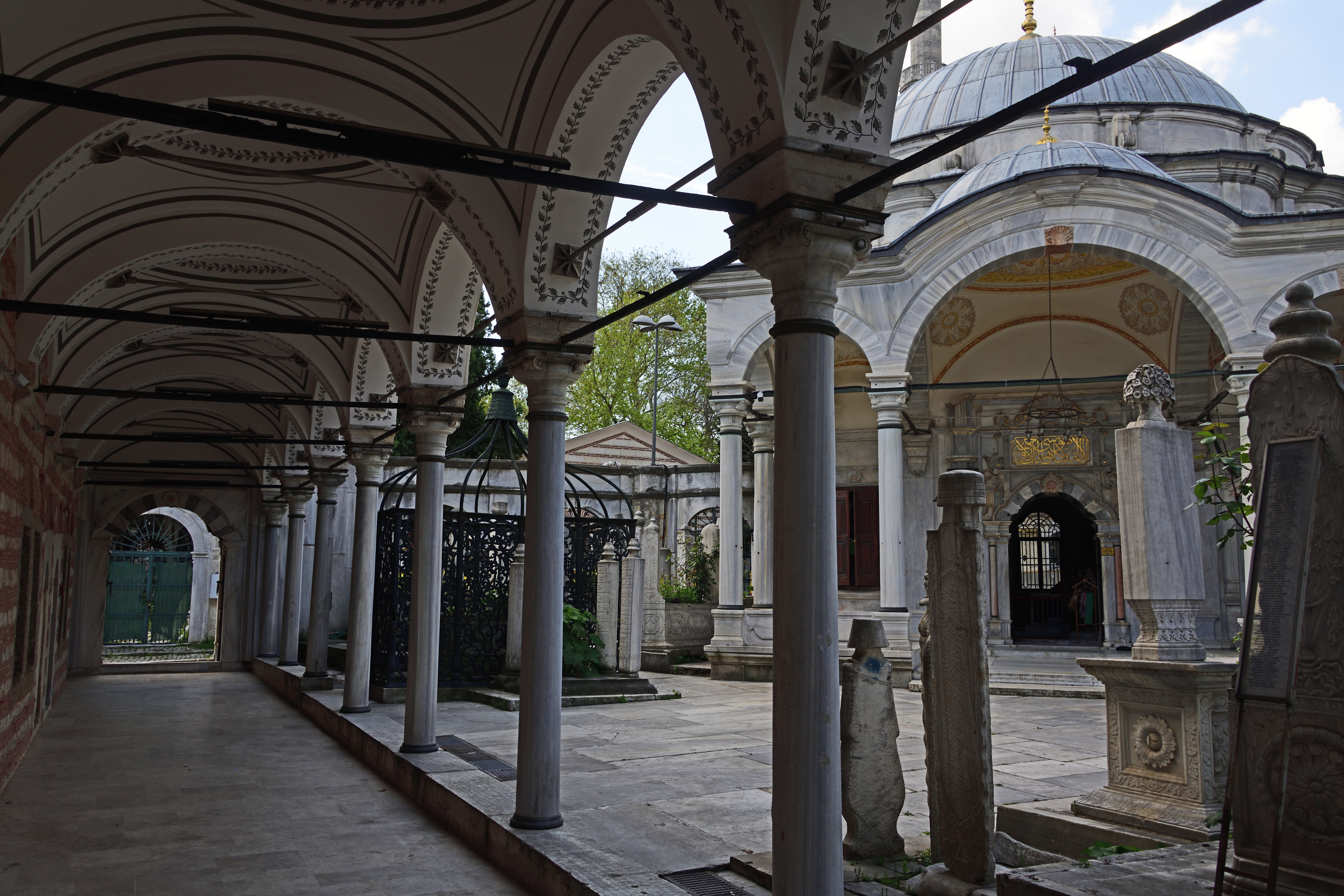
The western outer portico of the complex, part of the mektep, with the cemetery on the right

=== Mausoleum ===
The mausoleum (or türbe) is a circular structure covered by a dome. Its exterior façade is divided into twelve convex sections, each containing two windows (one above, one below) and bordered by engaged columns. The façade is further divided into horizontal zones by projecting cornices. The engaged columns on the lower half are made of verd antique and the upper ones are made of pink granite. The curved baroque windows have slightly projecting pink keystones.

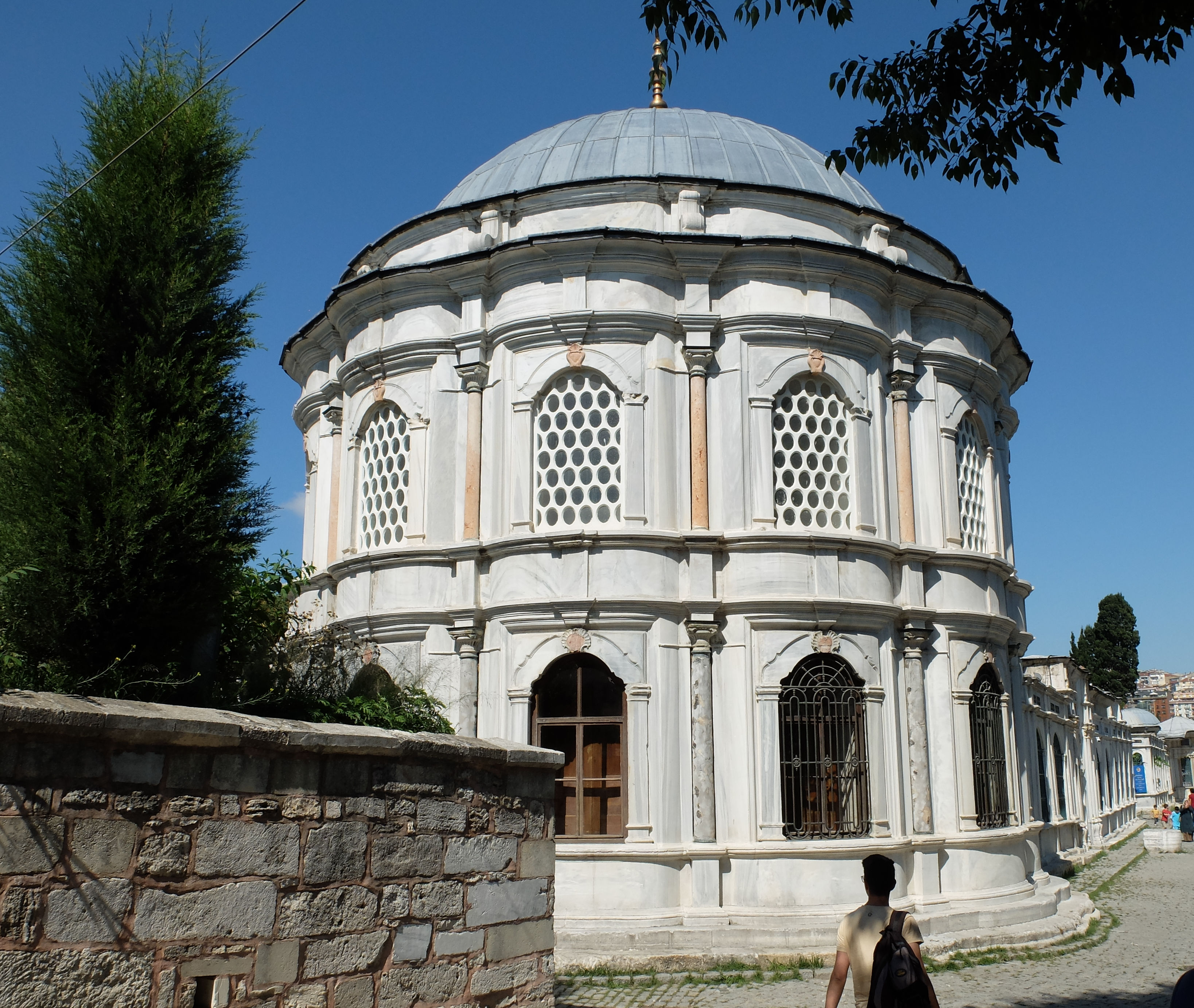
The mausoleum, located at the southwest corner of the complex

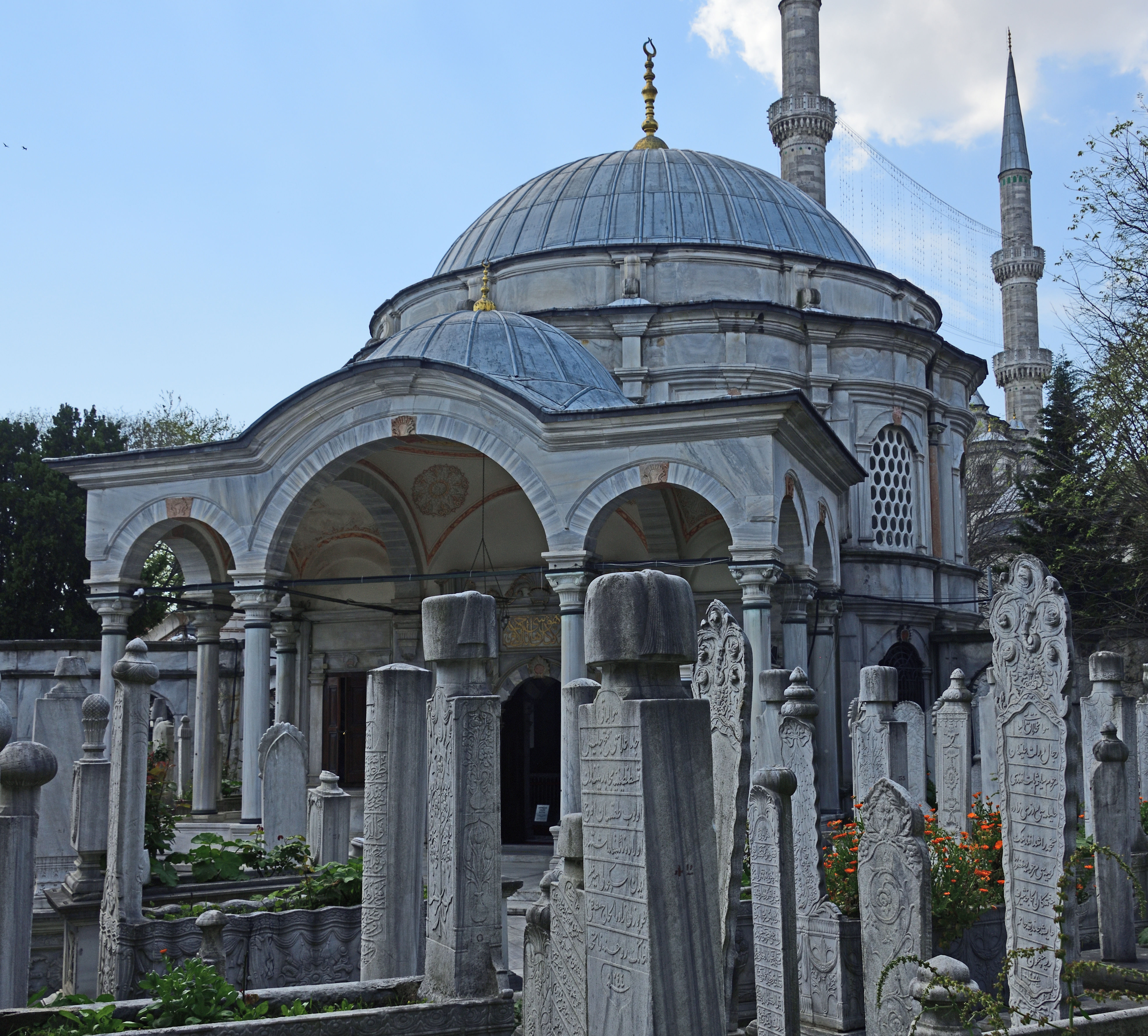
View of the mausoleum and its entrance porch from the north, inside the cemetery

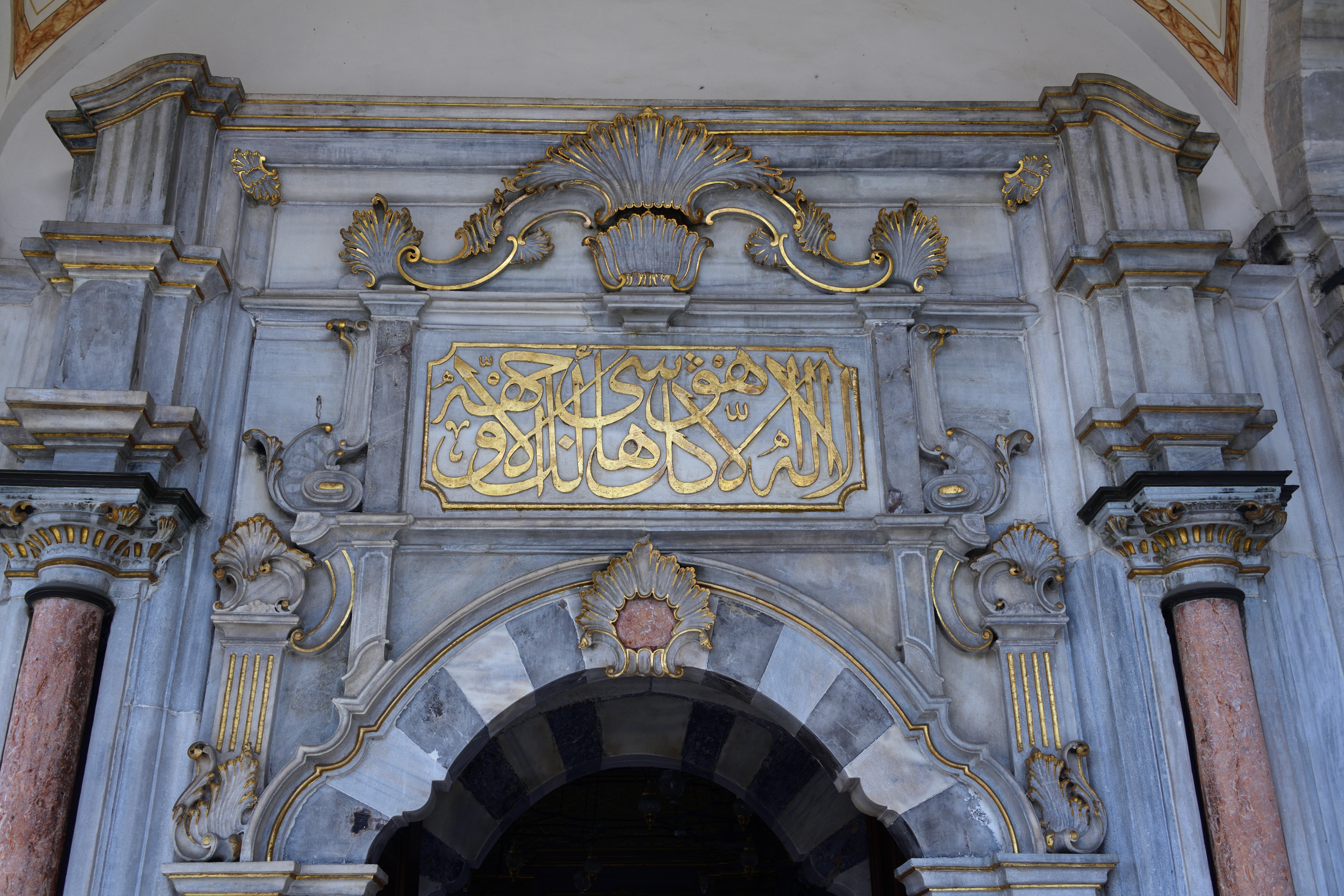
Decoration above the mausoleum's entrance doorway

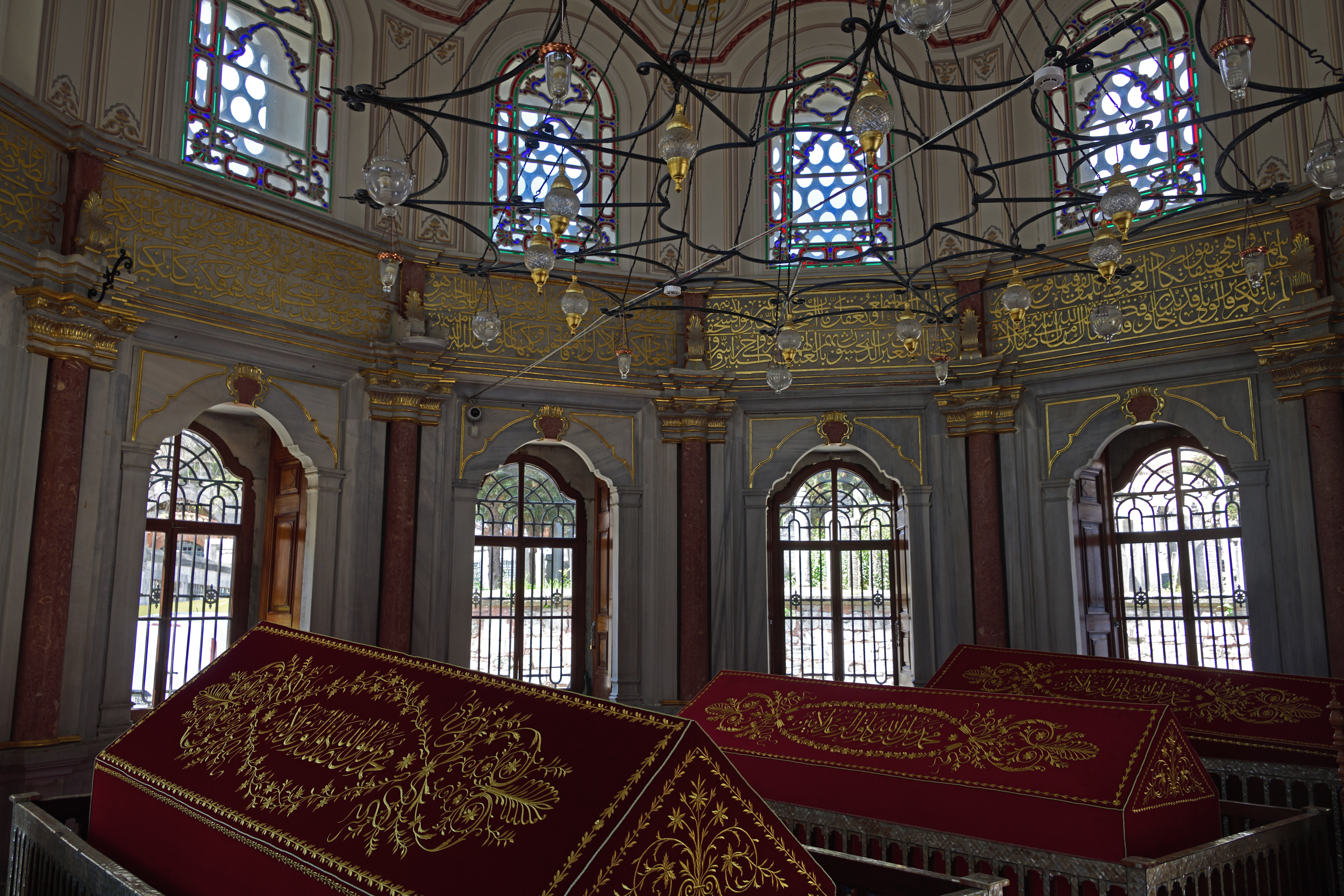
The mausoleum interior

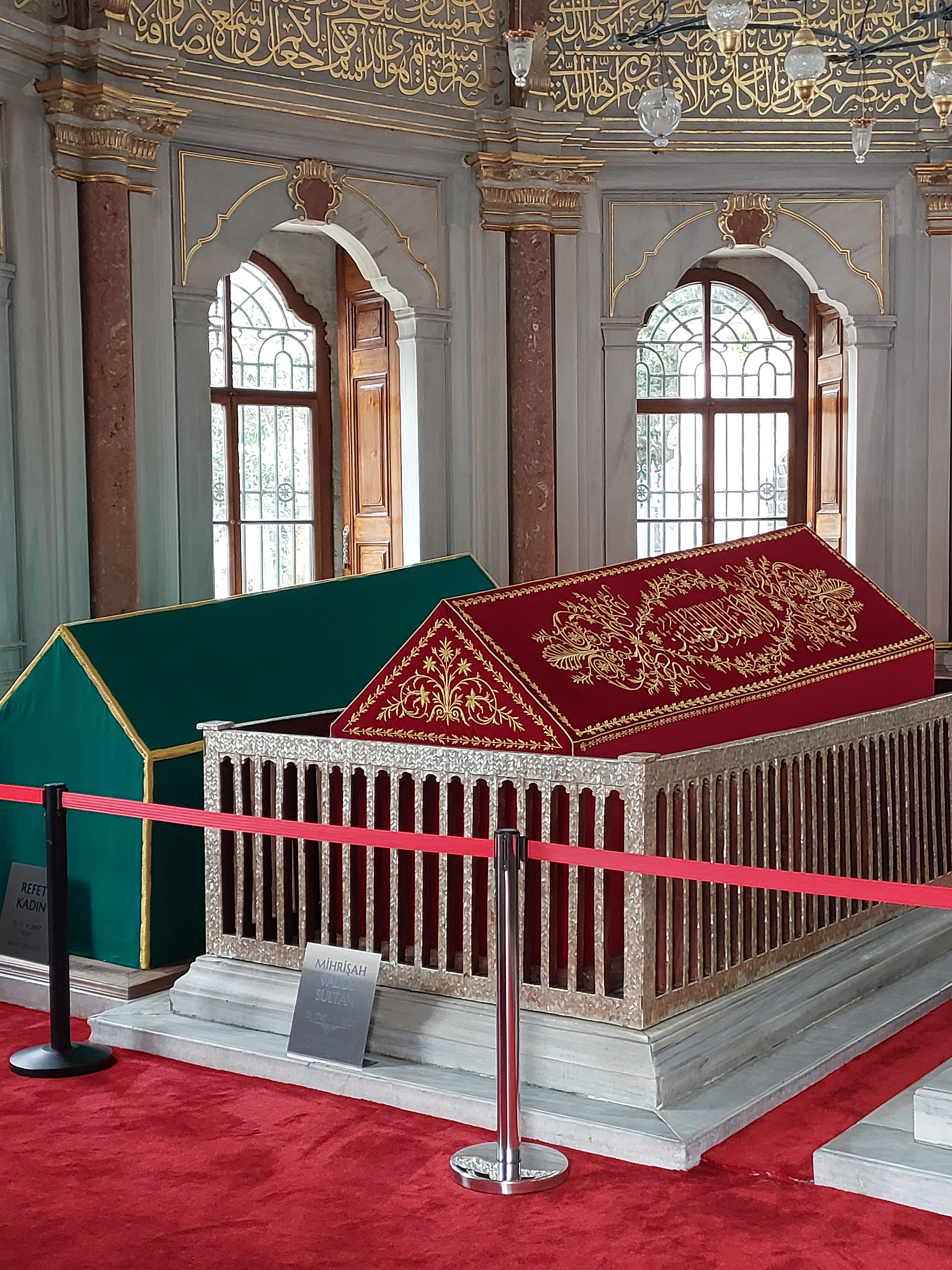
The cenotaph of Mihrişah Sultan

=== Sebil ===
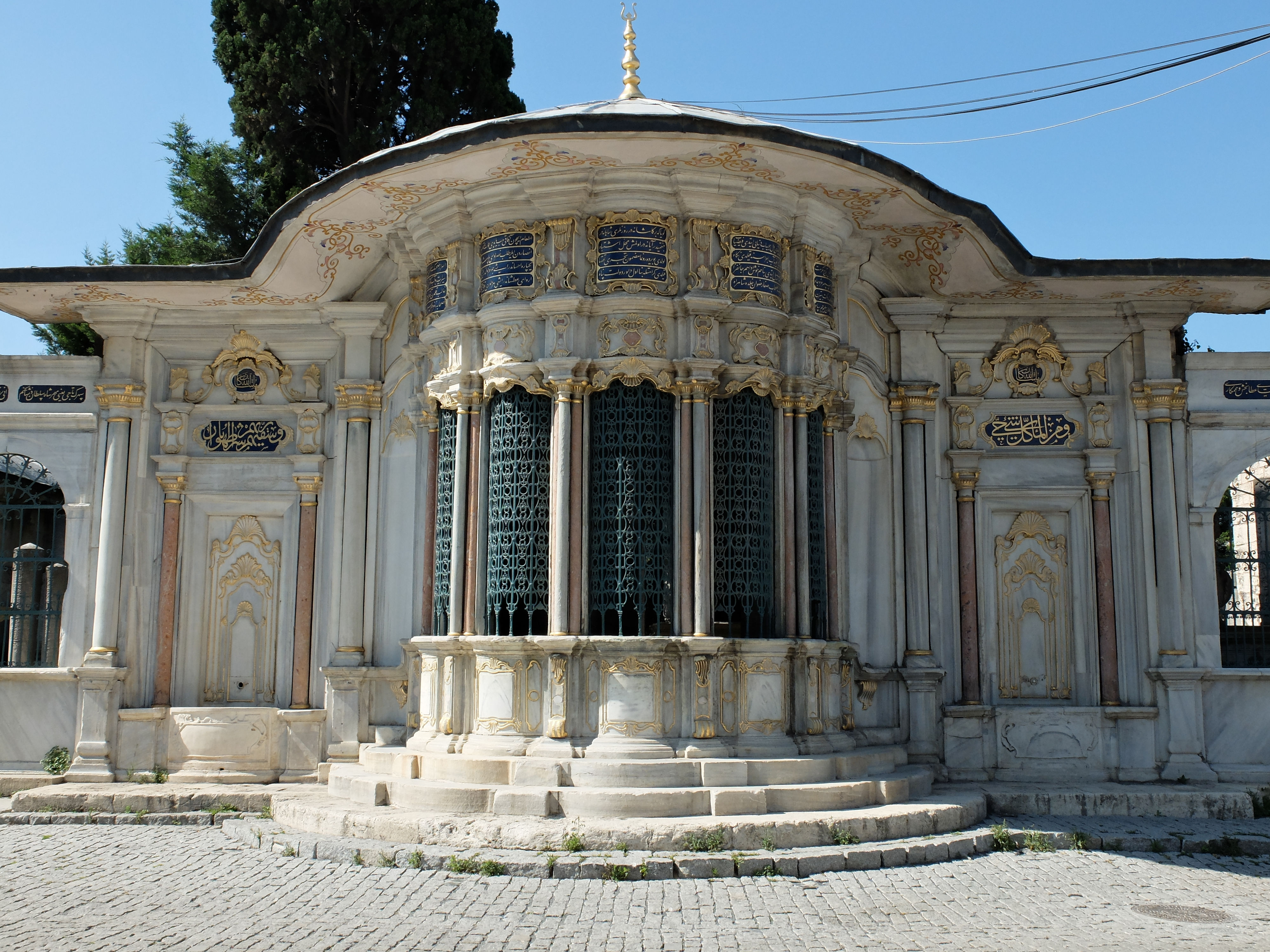
The sebil (center), flanked by two wall fountains

The semi-circular sebil, dated to 1795, is located on the street façade of the complex. It has five grilled windows used for providing water to visitors or passersby on the street. Similar to the tomb, the façade is divided into multiple convex sections, but the compositions are even more curved and ornate. Groups of colonettes and pilasters divide these sections. The ornamentation diverges further from traditional Ottoman decoration in the shape of its arches and in the three-dimensional sculpting of shells and shell-like leaves. This type of decoration extends to the two adjoining wall fountains on either side of the sebil. Scholar Doğan Kuban compares the sebil's ornamentation to the French Rocaille style and notes its similarities with the ornamentation found in the apartments of Abdülhamid I and Selim III at Topkapı Palace from around the same era.

== Burials ==
- Mihrişah Sultan (mother of Selim III) (c. 1745–1805)
- Hatice Sultan (daughter of Mustafa III) (1768–1822)
- Beyhan Sultan (daughter of Mustafa III) (1766–1824)
- Rahime Perestu Sultan (c. 1830–c. 1906), first legal wife of Sultan Abdulmejid I
- Alev Alatlı (1944–2024), writer, economist
