= Hatice Sultan Mansion =

Historical waterside mansion

Coordinates: 41°02′56.40″N 29°01′46.56″E

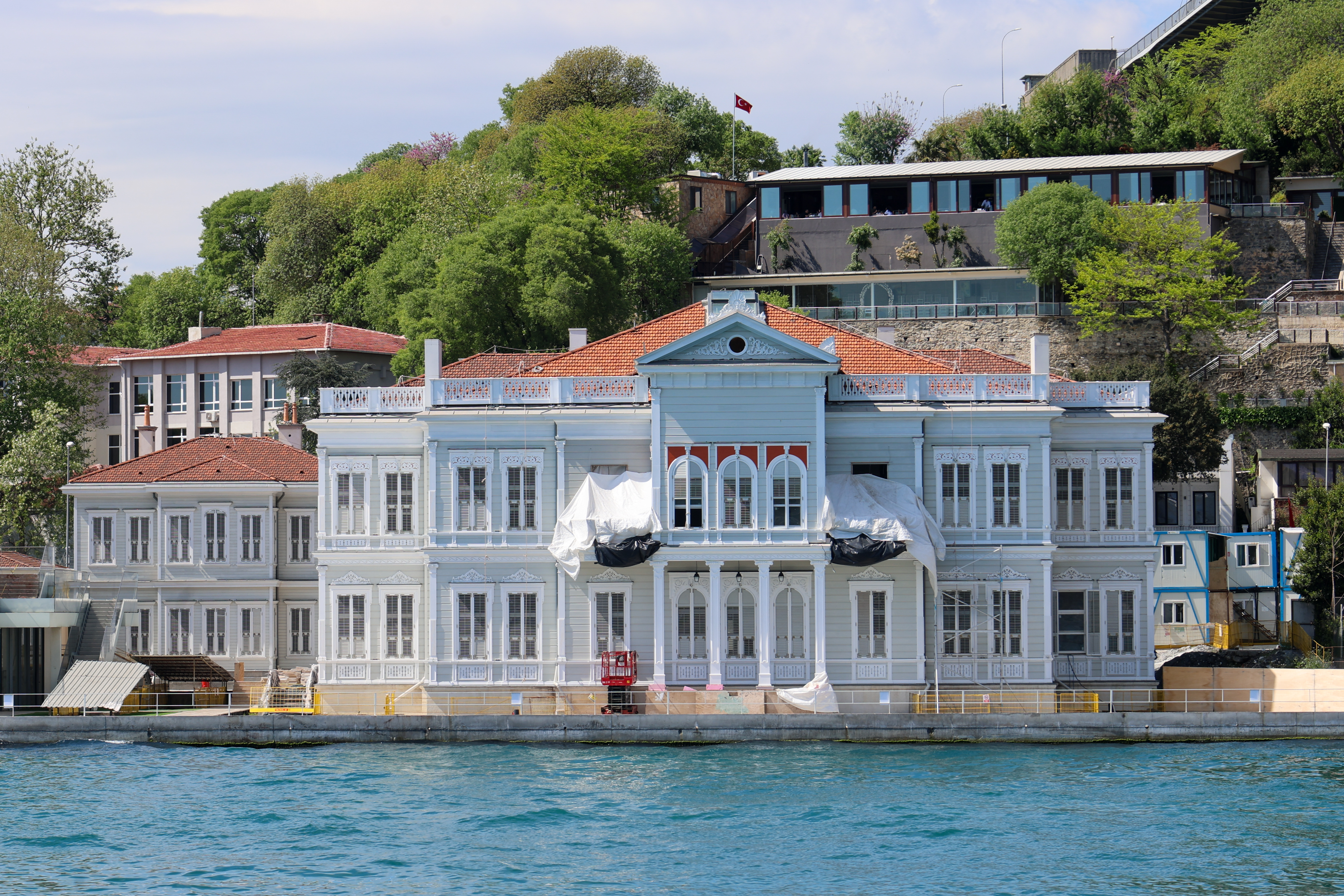
Hatice Sultan Mansion

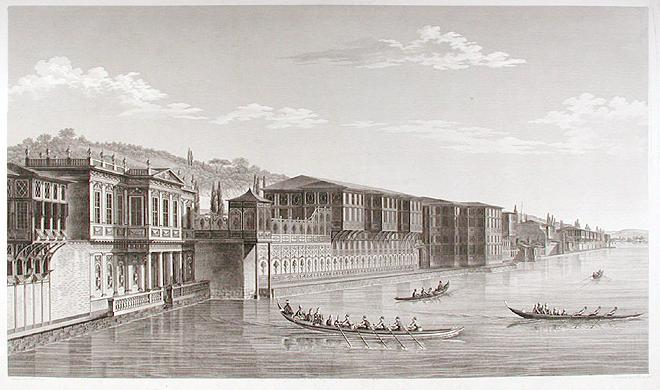
Hatice Sultan Mansion

The Hatice Sultan Mansion (Turkish: Hatice Sultan Yalısı), a historical yalı (English: waterside mansion) located on the Bosphorus in the Ortaköy neighborhood of Istanbul, Turkey, and named after its original owner Hatice Sultan, is used today as the building of a water sports club.

The residence at Defterdarburnu (Defterdar Point) in Ortaköy was used as an orphanage and later as a primary school after the Ottoman dynasty was exiled following the foundation of the Turkish Republic.

== See also ==
- Ottoman architecture
