= Mihrişah Sultan (mother of Selim III) =

Valide Sultan of the Ottoman Empire from 1789 to 1805

- Valide sultan

Valide sultan of the Ottoman Empire
- Reign: 7 April 1789 – 16 October 1805
- Predecessor: Şehsuvar Sultan
- Successor: Sineperver Sultan
- Born: c. 1745; Georgia
- Died: 16 October 1805 (aged 59–60); Constantinople, Ottoman Empire (now Istanbul, Turkey)
- Burial: Mihrişah Sultan Complex, Eyüp, Istanbul
- Consort: Mustafa III
- Issue: Hibetullah Sultan; Selim III; Fatma Sultan
Names
- Turkish: Mihrişah Sultan; Ottoman Turkish: مھرشاہ سلطان
- Religion: Sunni Islam (converted)

Mihrişah Sultan (Ottoman Turkish: مهرشاہ سلطان; c. 1745 – 16 October 1805) was a consort of Sultan Mustafa III, and the mother of Selim III of the Ottoman Empire, and his Valide sultan for 16 years from 1789 until her death in 1805.

== Early life ==
Of ethnic Georgian origin, Mihrişah was born in 1745 in Georgia, but there were also rumors that she was in part Genoese. She was considered beautiful, and was called "the Georgian Beauty" (Turkish: Gürcü güzeli).

== As imperial consort ==
Mihrişah entered Mustafa III's harem via the Black Sea slave trade circa 1757 and became one of his consorts and then the become his chief consort. On 17 March 1759, she gave birth to her first child, a daughter, Hibetullah Sultan. For the previous thirty years, no child had been born in the imperial family, hence, Hibetullah's birth was celebrated in the whole of Istanbul.

On 24 December 1761, she gave birth to her second child, a son, Şehzade Selim (future Selim III). His birth was accompanied by celebrations that lasted a week. On 9 January 1770, she gave birth to her third child, a daughter, Fatma Sultan, who died at the age of two on 26 May 1772.

She was widowed in 1774, after which she settled in the Old Palace. An archival document from the Topkapı Palace shows that Mustafa III borrowed money from her and that, due to his death, the debt was not repaid.

Mihrişah and her son Selim were both members of the Mevlevi Order, which practiced Sufi whirling.

== As Valide Sultan ==
=== Selim's accession and political influence ===
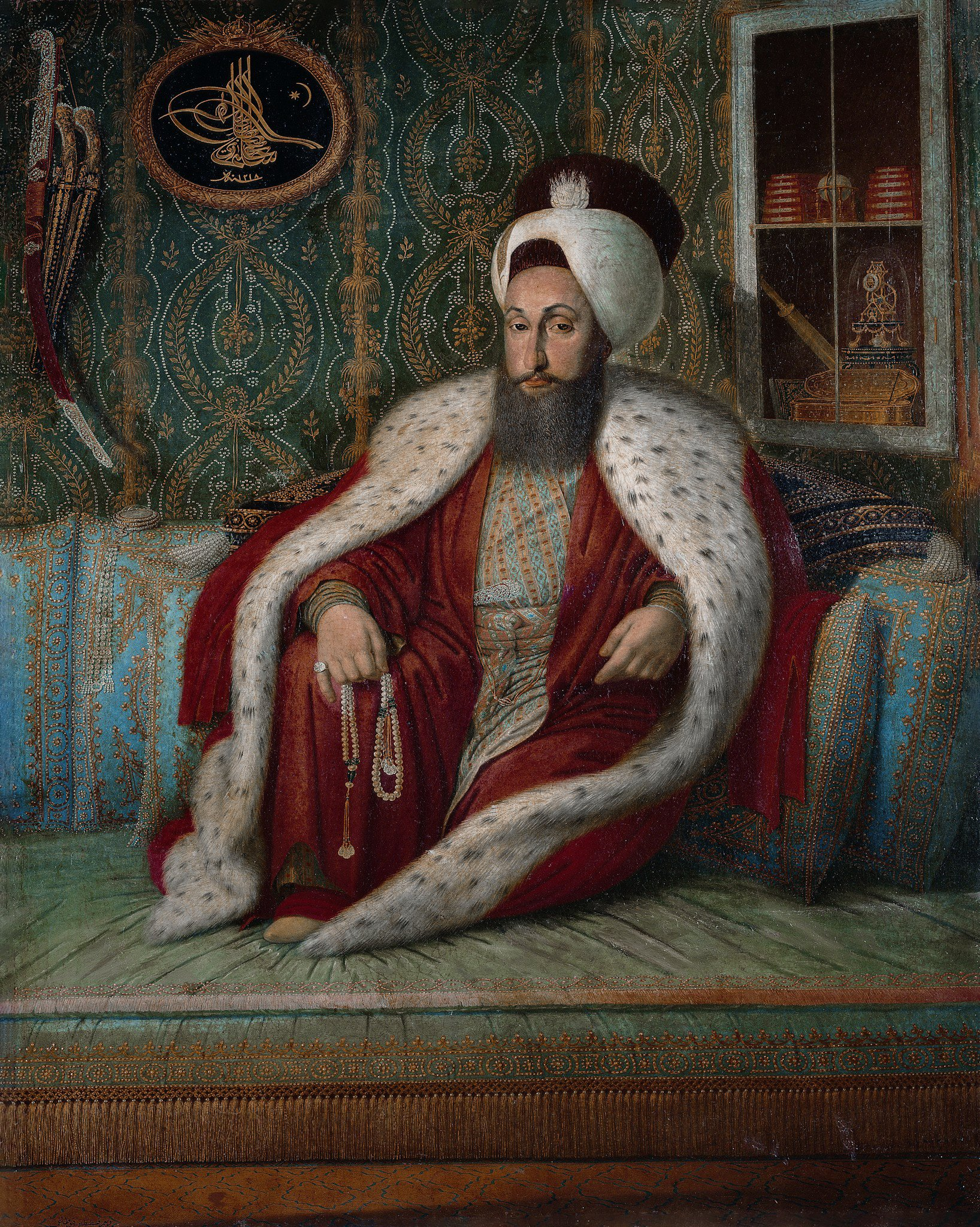
The son of Mihrişah Valide Sultan Selim III

During the reign of Sultan Abdul Hamid I, which lasted for fifteen years, Şehzade Selim remained closed in the Topkapı Palace, and the Mihrişah was sent to live in the Old Palace. Upon Abdul Hamid's death in 1789, Selim ascended the throne after which Mihrişah became the Valide Sultan, and was the first Valide Sultan since the death of Şehsuvar Sultan, the mother of Osman III, as the mothers of both Mustafa III and Abdul Hamid I had died prior to their son's accession to the throne.

She occasionally approached her son to beg a favour or an act of mercy. When he launched his Nizam-I Cedid (New Order), both Mihrişah and her Kethüda, by then Yusuf Agha, were his strong supporters. To encourage the reforms so dear to her son's heart, Mihrişah built a mosque for the Humbaracıhane (barracks of the bombardiers) at Hasköy on the Asiatic shore, and founded a school of medicine at Üsküdar.

Yusuf Agha was her second kethüda, who had replaced her first kethüda Mahmud Agha, when he died during tenure of his office. He was capable, and an intimate of Selim. He was persuaded and finally killed by the machinations of Kabakçı Mustafa in the uprising against Selim in 1808, after which his tax farm was given to Sultan Mustafa IV's mother, Sineperver Sultan.

On 19 December 1792, she attended the wedding of Esma Sultan, the daughter of Abdul Hamid I and Sineperver Sultan to Küçük Hüseyin Pasha. Mihrişah had sent Esma several valuable gifts as part of her dowry.

=== Patroness of architecture ===
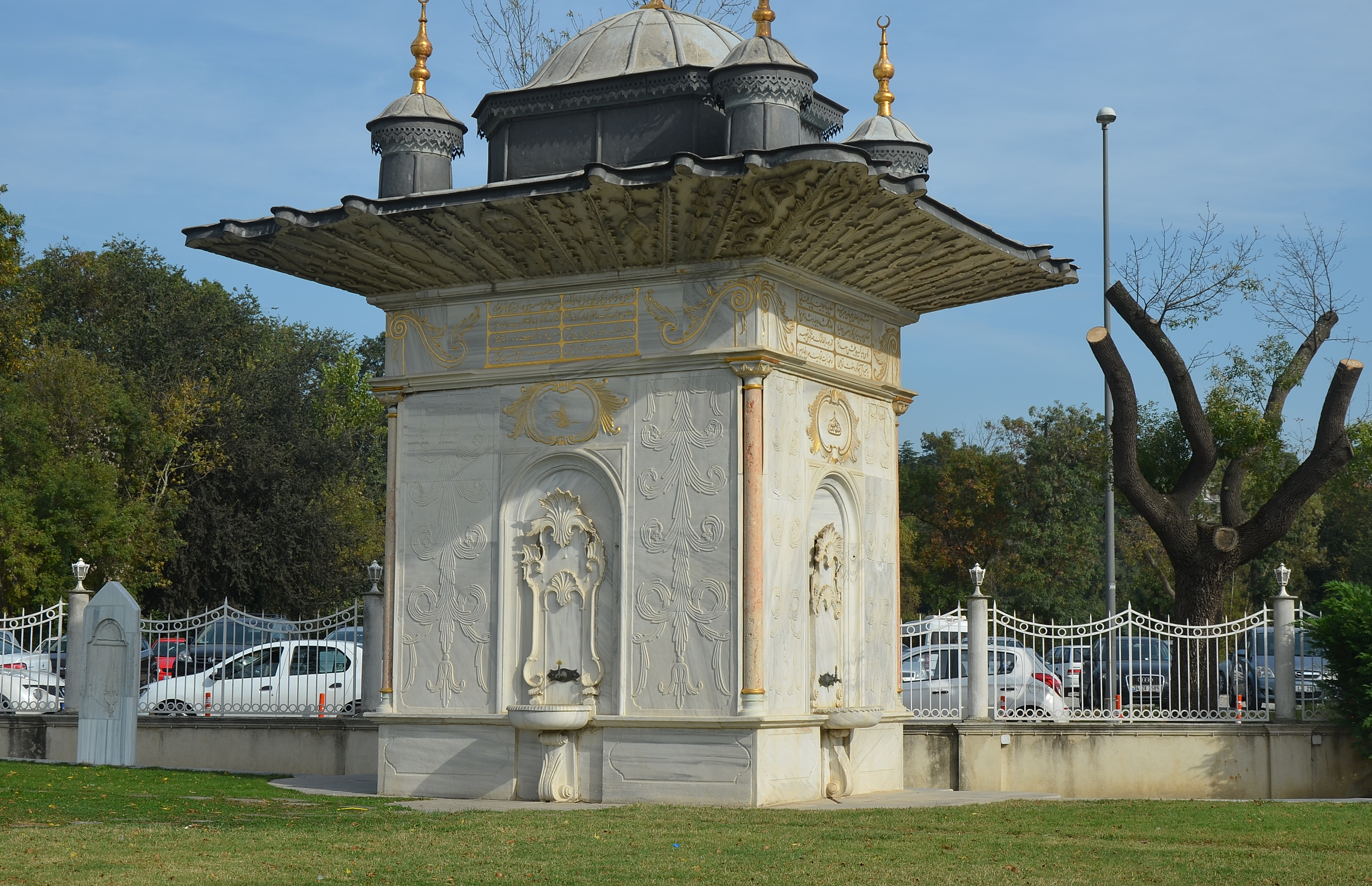
Mihrişah Sultan Fountain in Yeniköy

Mihrişah was very active in the 1790s as a patron of architecture, especially schools and mosques.

She founded the Humbarahane Barracks, in 1792, which were considered the first modern example of large-scale military buildings. In addition to that, she also commissioned the Humbarahane Barracks Mosque in the same area.

She constructed the Mihrişah Sultan Complex, which she founded in 1792 and which was completed in 1796, is in the neighbourhood of Eyüp in Istanbul. It includes her mausoleum and an imaret (soup kitchen), today the last still-functioning Ottoman imaret. It also included three fountains, a primary school and her own tomb.

In 1793, Mihrişah founded Halıcıoğlu Mosque, and reconstructed it. She was responsible for the building of the Valide Dam on the eastern branch of Istanbul, to provide additional water supply to the general population.

Mihrişah also built a number of fountains:

- a fountain in Üsküdar İhsaniye in memory of her daughter Hibetullah Sultan, in 1791
- a fountain in memory of her daughter Fatma Sultan, in 1792
- repairs on the Silahtar Yusuf Pasha Fountain in Kağıthane, in 1794
- a fountain between Eminönü and Balıkpazarı in honor of Çaşnigir Zeynep (later called Mihrişah Vâlide Fountain), in 1796
- two fountains on either side of the sebil built for her complex Eyüp, in 1796
- a fountain in Fındıklı Mollabayırı, in 1797
- a fountain in Kılıçali District in Beşiktaş, in 1797
- a fountain in memory of her daughter Fatma Sultan (later called Mihrişah Valide Sultan Fountain) in Yeniköy, Istanbul, in 1805

Fountains built by Mihrişah met the water needs of people in the Beyoğlu, Galata and Boğaziçi neighbourhoods.

== Death ==
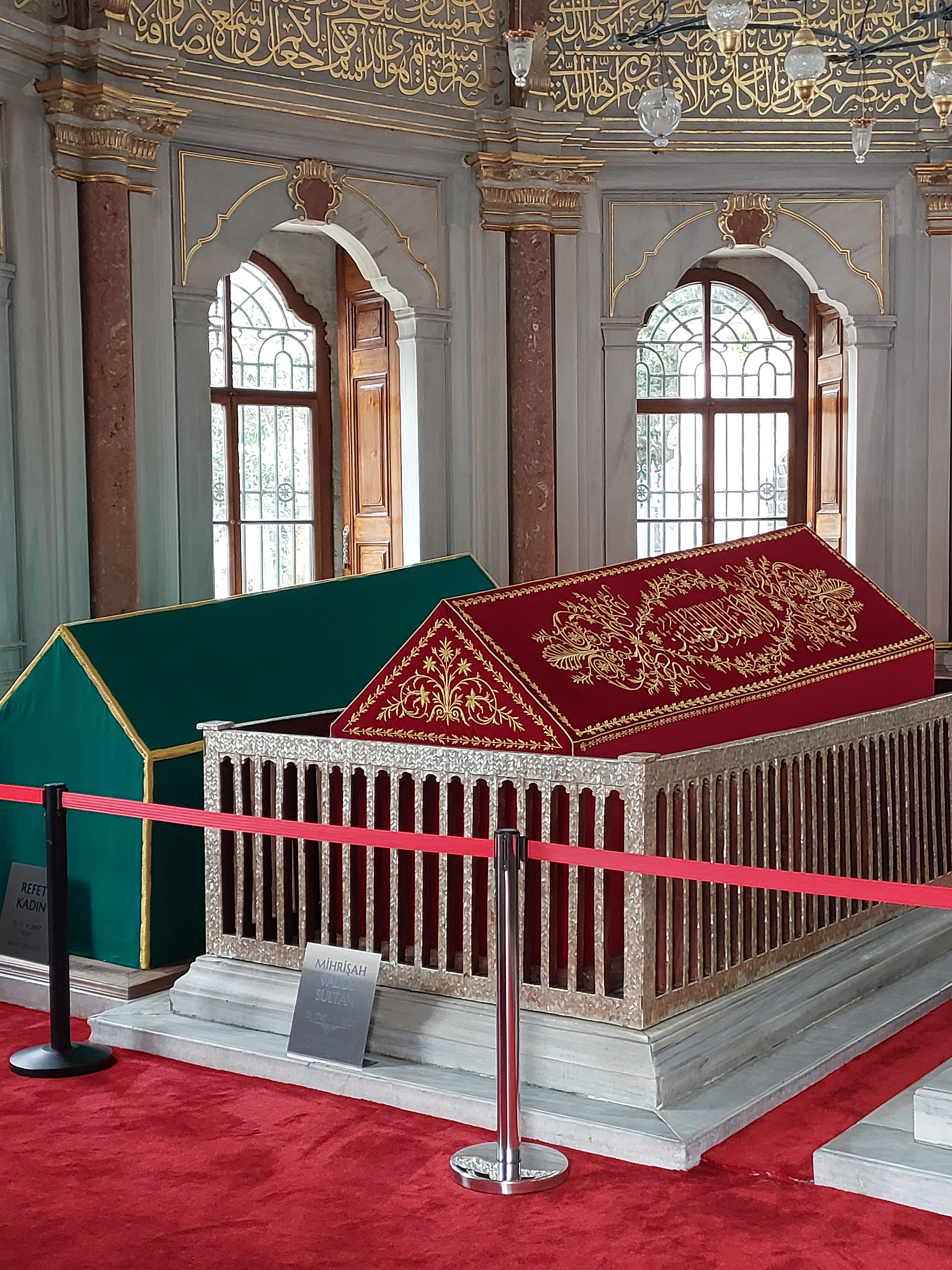
Tomb of Mihrişah Sultan, located within her charitable complex in Eyüpsultan, Istanbul

Mihrişah Sultan died on 16 October 1805 of unknown causes. She was buried in her charitable complex located at Eyüp, Istanbul.

== Issue ==
Together with Mustafa III, Mihrişah had a son and two daughters:

- Hibetullah Sultan (17 March 1759 – 7 June 1762, buried in Mustafa III Mausoleum, Laleli Mosque, Istanbul), Her birth was the first imperial birth in 29 years, and was therefore celebrated for ten days and ten nights in an extremely luxurious way. Her nurse was Emine Hanım, sister of Aynülhayat Kadın, and, being Mustafa's mother, Mihrişah Kadin, died, was his sister, Saliha Sultan, wife of the Grand Vizier, who presided over her Cradle Procession. On 2 June 1759, at three months, she was betrothed to Mahir Hamid Hamza Paşah. In the luxurious ceremony, her father gave her the lands of Gümrükçü, but she died of illness at the age of three before being able to celebrate the marriage. She was buried in the Mustafa III mausoleum.
- Selim III (Topkapı Palace, 24 December 1761 – 28 July 1808, buried in Mustafa III Mausoleum), 28th Sultan of the Ottoman Empire.
- Fatma Sultan (9 January 1770 – 26 May 1772, buried in Mustafa III Mausoleum, Laleli Mosque, Istanbul).

== In popular culture ==
- In 1989 Swiss-American drama film The Favorite, Mihrişah is portrayed by French actress Andréa Parisy.
- In 2012 Turkish miniseries Esir Sultan, Mihrişah is portrayed by Turkish actress Ipek Tenolcay.

== See also ==
- Ottoman dynasty
- Ottoman Imperial Harem
- List of Valide Sultans
- List of consorts of the Ottoman Sultans
- List of mothers of the Ottoman sultans

== Sources ==
- Akkurt, Ibrahim (2018). Mihrişah Vâlide Sultan ve Külliyesi.
- Davis, Fanny (1986). The Ottoman Lady: A Social History from 1718 to 1918. Greenwood Publishing Group. ISBN 978-0-313-24811-5.
- Goodwin, Godfrey (1971). A History of Ottoman Architecture. Thames & Hudson. ISBN 0-500-27429-0.
- Kazancıoğlu, Habibe (2016). Mihrişah Valide Sultan Su Bendi.
- Rüstem, Ünver (2019). Ottoman Baroque: The Architectural Refashioning of Eighteenth-Century Istanbul. Princeton University Press. ISBN 9780691181875.
- Uluçay, M. Çağatay (2011). Padişahların kadınları ve kızları. Ankara, Ötüken.

Ottoman royalty
Preceded by Şehsuvar Sultan	Valide Sultan; 7 April 1789 – 16 October 1805	Succeeded by Sineperver Sultan
