= Dürrüşehvar Sultan (disambiguation) =

Dürrüşehvar Sultan may refer to:

- Dürrüşehvar Hanım (1767 - 1831) - Ottoman princess, daughter of Sultan Abdülhamid I
- Dürrüşehvar Sultan (1914-2006) - Ottoman princess, daughter of Caliph Abdülmecid II
