= Rabia Şermi Kadın =

Consort of Sultan Ahmed III

Şermi Kadın
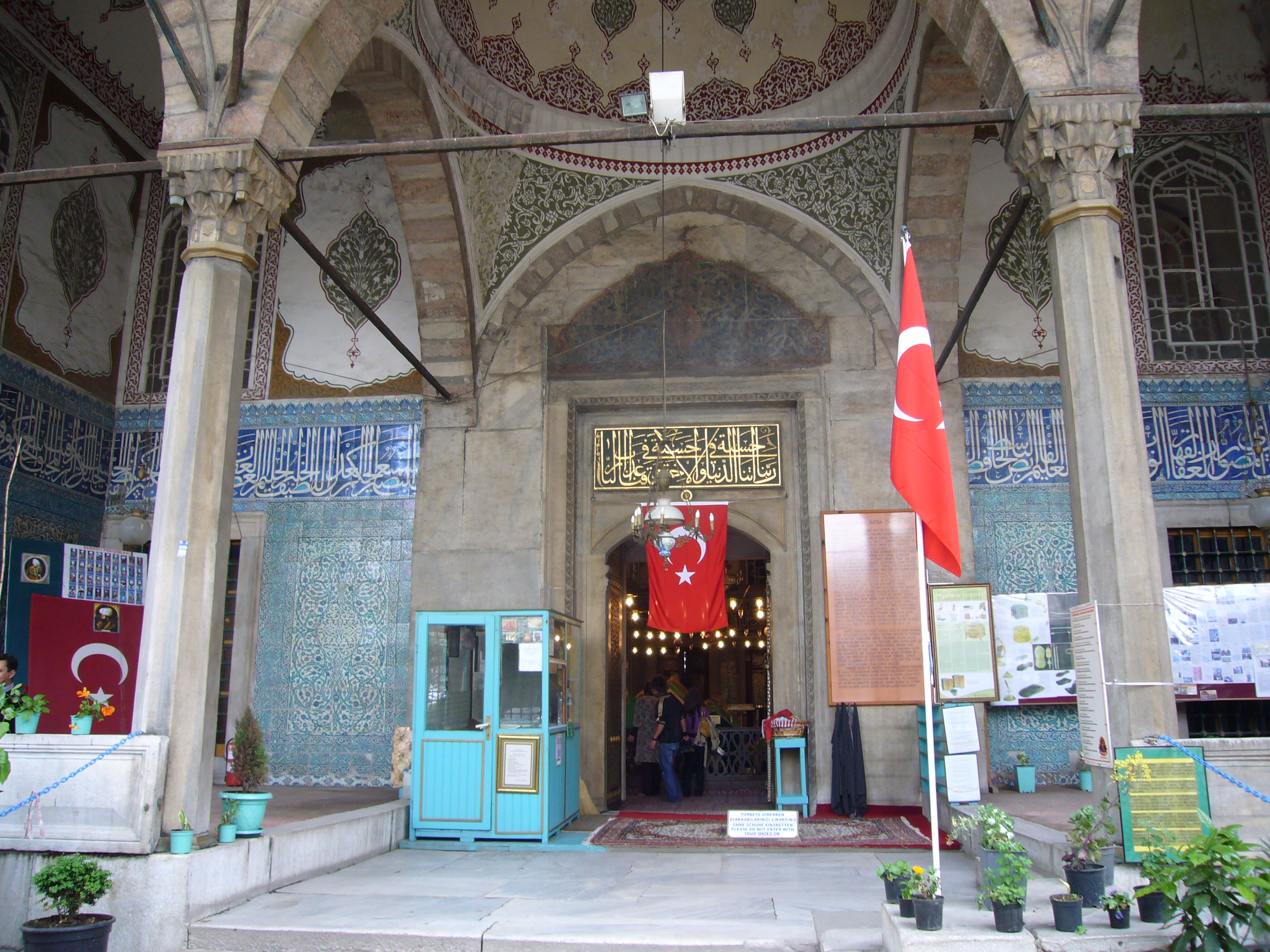
- The burial place of Rabia Şermi Kadın is located inside The Cedid Havatin outbuilding of the mausoleum of Turhan Sultan, next to the tomb of her fellow consort Mihrişah Kadın, in New Mosque at Eminönü in Istanbul.
- Died: c. 1732; Eski Palace, Beyazıt Square, Constantinople, Ottoman Empire (modern-day Istanbul, Turkey)
- Burial: Imperial ladies Mausoleum, New Mosque, Eminönü, Istanbul
- Consort of: Ahmed III
- Issue: Rabia Sultan; Abdul Hamid I
Names
- Turkish: Rabia Şermi Kadın; Ottoman Turkish: رابعه شرمى قادين
- Religion: Sunni Islam

Rabia Şermi Kadın (Ottoman Turkish: رابعه شرمی قادین; died c. 1732) was a consort of Sultan Ahmed III of the Ottoman Empire and the mother of Sultan Abdul Hamid I.

== Life ==
Her birthplace and date are unknown. She fell victim to the Ottoman slave trade and was placed in the Ottoman Imperial harem as the concubine of Ahmed III. According to the rules of the court, her name was changed to Şermi which means insatiable beauty.

On 19 November 1719, she gave birth to her first child, a daughter Rabia Sultan. The princess died young. On 20 March 1725 she gave birth to her second child, a son Şehzade Abdul Hamid. Şermi paid great zeal of attention towards Abdul Hamid's education. In 1728, when he was three she commissioned a fountain in Şemsipaşan and Üsküdar. Ahmed was deposed in 1730, and his nephew Mahmud I ascended the throne. Şermi along with other ladies of Ahmed's harem went to the Old Palace, at Beyazıt Square.

== Death and aftermath ==
Şermi died in 1732, leaving Abdul Hamid motherless at the age of seven. He was then entrusted to the care of his elder half-brother Mustafa III. She was buried in the mausoleum of imperial ladies, in the New Mosque in Istanbul next to her fellow consort Mihrişah Kadın.

Abdul Hamid ascended the throne in 1774 after the death of his elder half-brother Mustafa III. However, she was never Valide Sultan, as she had died 42 years before Abdul Hamid ascended the throne. In 1778, under the architect Tahir Ağa, he commissioned the construction of Beylerbeyi Mosque in memory of his mother. The complex also included a soup kitchen, a primary school and public bath.

== Issue ==
Together with Ahmed, Şermi had one son and one daughter:

- Rabia Sultan (19 November 1719 – c. 1724, buried in New Mosque)
- Abdul Hamid I (Topkapı Palace, 20 March 1725 - Istanbul, Turkey, 7 April 1789, buried in Tomb of Abdul Hamid I, Fatih, Istanbul). He was the 27° Sultan of the Ottoman Empire, after forty-four years of reclusion in the Kafes.

== See also ==
- Ottoman Empire
- Ottoman dynasty
- Ottoman family tree
- List of sultans of the Ottoman Empire
- Line of succession to the Ottoman throne
- Ottoman Emperors family tree (simplified)
- List of consorts of the Ottoman Sultans
