= Abdelkrim Ragoun =

Moroccan diplomat

Rais Abdelkrim Ragoun was a Moroccan diplomat.

== Career ==
In 1766, Sultan Mohammed ben Abdallah (Sultan Mohammed III) appointed Abdelkrim Ragoun as the Moroccan Ambassador to the Ottoman Empire, reflecting the sultan's support for the Islamic realm following the Russo-Turkish War. Ragoun, originally from Tetouan, was sent to the court of Ottoman Sultan Mustafa III to convey this solidarity.

Ragoun started his diplomatic mission in 1766 with the aim to support the Turks, who had recently experienced conflict with the Russians. Upon reaching the Ottoman capital, Constantinople, Ragoun presented a message from Sultan Mohammed III, expressing alignment with the Ottoman Empire. The ambassador remained in the Ottoman capital for a year before returning to Morocco.

In 1777, Ragoun's efforts culminated in Ottoman Sultan Mustapha III's gift of a battleship to the Moroccan Sultan, symbolizing the strengthened bond between the two empires.
