= Şah Sultan (daughter of Mustafa III) =

Daughter of Sultan Mustafa III

- Born: 21 April 1761; Topkapı Palace, Constantinople, Ottoman Empire
- Died: 11 March 1803 (aged 41); Cağaloğlu Palace, Constantinople, Ottoman Empire
- Burial: Şah Sultan Mausoleum, Eyüp, Istanbul
- Spouse: Nişancı Seyyid Mustafa Pasha (m. 1778)
- Issue: Şerife Havva Hanımsultan; Aliye Hanımsultan; New Hanim (adopted)
- Dynasty: Ottoman
- Father: Mustafa III
- Mother: Rifat Kadın
- Religion: Sunni Islam

Şah Sultan (Ottoman Turkish: شاہ سلطان; 21 April 1761 – 11 March 1803) was an Ottoman princess, the daughter of Sultan Mustafa III and his consort Rifat Kadın. She was the half sister of Sultan Selim III.

== Early life ==
Şah Sultan was born on 21 April 1761 in the Topkapı Palace. Her father was Sultan Mustafa III, and her mother the consort Rifat Kadın, a freeborn woman. Previously, it has been suggested that her mother was Mihrişah Kadin, but it has been established that Şah was born only eight months before Mihrişah's certain son, Selim III.

On 24 April 1764, when Şah was three years old, her father betrothed her to the Grand Vizier Köse Bahir Mustafa Pasha. However, he was dismissed from his post and killed in 1765.

On 2 January 1768, when Şah was seven years old, she was betrothed to Nişancı Yağlıkçızade Mehmed Emin Pasha. He became the Grand Vizier the same year, and was killed in 1769.

In 1774 Mustafa III died and Şah was relegated, together with her half-sisters and her father's consorts, to the Old Palace.

== Marriage ==
On 6 November 1778, during the reign of her uncle Sultan Abdul Hamid I, when Şah was seventeen years old, she married vizier Nişançı Seyyid Mustafa Pasha. The wedding procession followed the bride to Cağaloğlu Palace, located on the Divanyolu street. The wedding reception took place the next day. The couple together had two biological daughters and an adopted one.

Şah Sultan may have suffered health problems because she lived in a villa by the sea and was significantly less active than her other two half-sisters, Beyhan Sultan and Hatice Sultan. Selim III often visited them, staying for days and summoning the Grand Vizier there to discuss affairs of the state.

== Issue ==
By her marriage, Şah Sultan had two daughters:

- Şerife Havva Hanımsultan (1780 - six months after). Buried in Mustafa III's mausoleum.
- Aliye Hanımsultan (? - ?). Died aged around six months. Buried in Mustafa III's mausoleum.

After her daughters' death, she adopted one daughter:

- New Hanim (? - ?). She died at 18.

== Charities ==
In Tarih-i Cevdet it is claimed that Şah was an impeccable Muslim, who protected and helped the poor.

In 1792, Şah Sultan commissioned a fountain near the Kasım Gönanî Mosque in Yeşildirek. In 1800, she commissioned her own mausoleum, a school, and another fountain near Zal Mahmud Pasha's mausoleum in Eyüp.

The facade of the complex is located on the street in the east direction. There is a tomb with a small fountain on both sides on the left, a courtyard door to the right of the tomb, and a fountain with a median school on the far right. The entire facade is made of marble except for the decorated section with a cut stone braid on the far left of the courtyard facade, a rectangular shaped door and three window openings with bite iron. The courtyard door has a round arch.

== Death ==
Şah Sultan died on 11 March 1803 in the Çağaloğlu Palace, and was buried in her own mausoleum located in Eyüp. Her husband outlived her by ten years, dying in 1813.

== Sources ==
- Uluçay, Mustafa Çağatay (2011). Padişahların kadınları ve kızları. Ankara, Ötüken.
- Sakaoğlu, Necdet (2008). Bu mülkün kadın sultanları: Vâlide sultanlar, hâtunlar, hasekiler, kadınefendiler, sultanefendiler. Oğlak Yayıncılık. ISBN 978-9-753-29623-6.
