= Beylerbeyi Mosque =

Mosque in Beylerbeyi, Istanbul, Turkey

- Beylerbeyi Cami
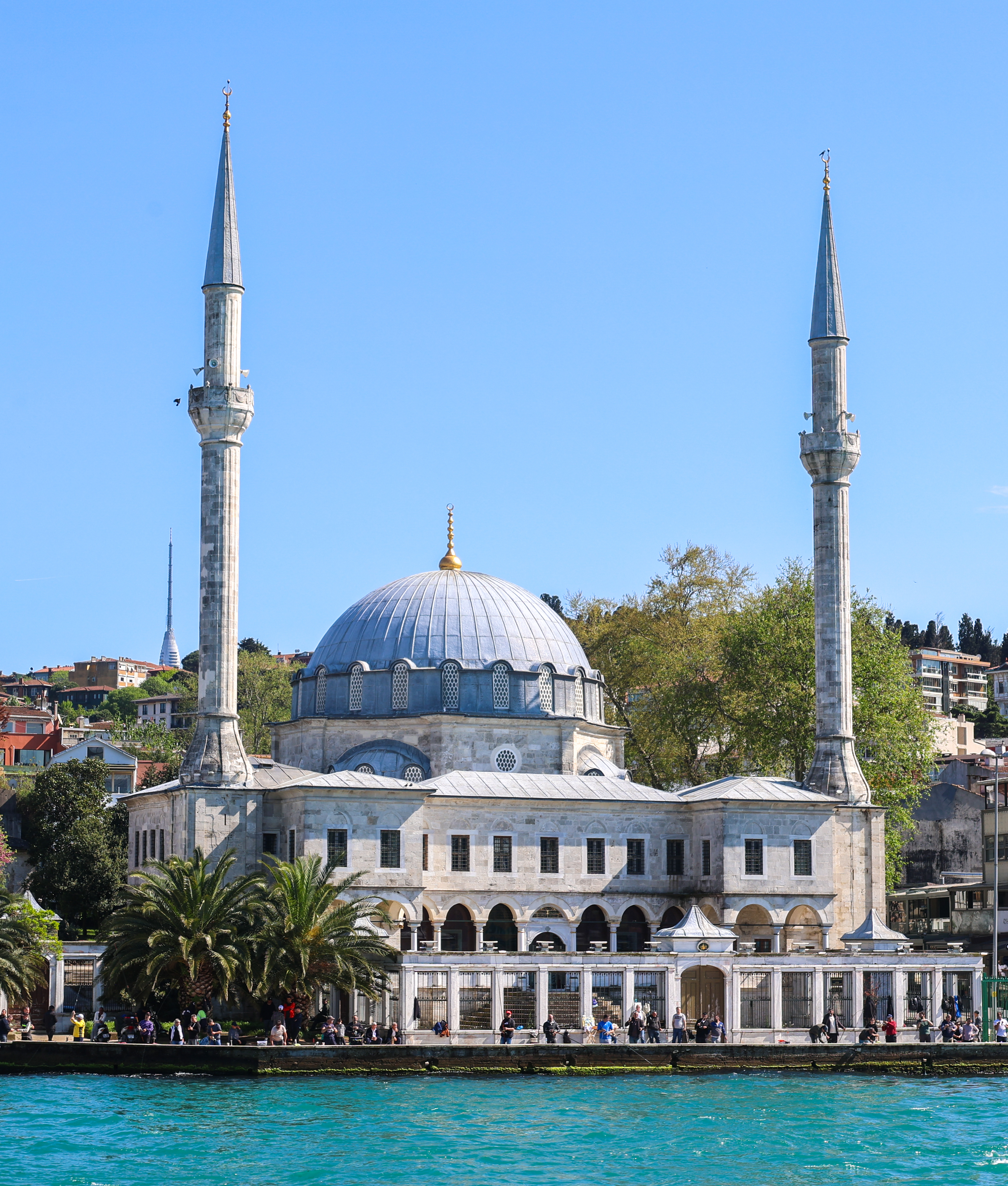

Religion
- Affiliation: Islam

Location
- Location: Beylerbeyi, Istanbul, Turkey
- Interactive map of Beylerbeyi Mosque
- Coordinates: 41°02′42.3″N 29°02′44.8″E

Architecture
- Type: Mosque
- Style: Ottoman Baroque
- Completed: 1777–1778 (original), 1820–1821 (renovation)

Specifications
- Dome dia. (inner): 14.5 m
- Minaret: 2
- Materials: cut stone, marble

The Beylerbeyi Mosque (Turkish: Beylerbeyi Camii), also known as the Hamid i-Evvel Mosque (Turkish: Hamid-i Evvel Camii), is a mosque located in the Beylerbeyi neighbourhood in Istanbul, Turkey. It was first built in 1777–1778 by the Ottoman sultan Abdul Hamid I, but was later modified by Mahmud II in 1820–1821.

== Historical background ==
Abdulhamid I (r. 1774–1789) built the Beylerbeyi Mosque in 1777–1778. Soon afterwards he also built the Emirgan Mosque (1781–82), and both are located in suburbs of Istanbul on the shores of the Bosphorus. During the reign of Abdulhamid I more foreign architects and artists arrived in Istanbul and the Ottoman Baroque style was being further consolidated. The architect of the mosque may have been Mehmed Tahir, the chief imperial architect at this time, but it has also been suggested that it could have been Edirneli Agop Ağa. The mosque was also constructed around the same time that Abdülhamid renovated the Imperial Hall in Topkapı Palace, and the decoration of this hall resembles the decoration of the mosque's interior. The Beylerbeyi Mosque was dedicated to his mother, Rabia Şermi Kadın (wife of Ahmed III). It was built on the site of a previous palace, the Istavroz Palace, which had been recently demolished.

The Beylerbeyi Mosque was later renovated and modified by Mahmud II (r. 1808–1839) in 1820–1821. According to Doğan Kuban, the mosque's present appearance today owes much to Mahmud II's renovation, and some elements of the complex were added in the Empire style that was introduced during his reign. The first mosque had only one minaret and its dome was made of wood, whereas Mahmud II's modifications introduced two symmetrical minarets. The imperial apartment (or at least a part of it) existed in the original mosque design, but Kuban believes it may have been modified by Mahmud II as well. Scholar Ünver Rüstem, in a recent study of Ottoman Baroque architecture, discusses this imperial pavilion as part of the original mosque.

== Architecture ==
In Ottoman architectural history, the Beylerbeyi Mosque is notable for being oriented towards the water; while some Istanbul mosques had been built along the waterside before, the Beylerbeyi Mosque is the first one which was clearly designed to present its main façade towards the shoreline. The mosque was intended to serve as the sultan's prayer space when he was residing in one of his palaces along the Bosphorus. Like most imperial Ottoman mosques, it was accompanied by other facilities and annexes, including a hammam (bathhouse), primary school and two fountains, which were built under Abdülhamid I. During Mahmud II's modifications, a clock room and another fountain were added.

The prayer hall is a traditional single-domed space, but the mosque's most innovative and influential feature is the wide two-story pavilion structure that occupies its front façade, replacing the traditional courtyard or entrance portico. This was an evolution of the imperial pavilions which were attached to the side or back of earlier mosques, but now taking on a more residential function as a royal apartment and forming an integrated part of the mosque's appearance. This new configuration was repeated in the design of later imperial mosques.

The mosque's main dome is 14.5 metres in diameter. On the entrance side of the hall is a U-shaped gallery which was probably part of the mosque's original design. On top of it is the sultan's loge (hünkâr mahfili), which has a Baroque style but also features a naturalistic landscape painting on its back wall which probably dates from the 19th century. The entrance gallery is supported by marble columns with Corinthian-like capitals that imitate those seen in monuments from the reign of Mahmud I (r. 1730–1754), at the beginning of the Baroque period. The mosque's mihrab, made of marble, is situated in a rectangular space projecting from the back of the mosque, covered by a semi-dome and flanked by marble columns at its corners. The interior decoration of the mosque today may not date from the original construction. It consists of painted decoration and a mix of local and imported foreign tiles, including reused Iznik tiles and Kütahya tiles from the 16th and 17th centuries.

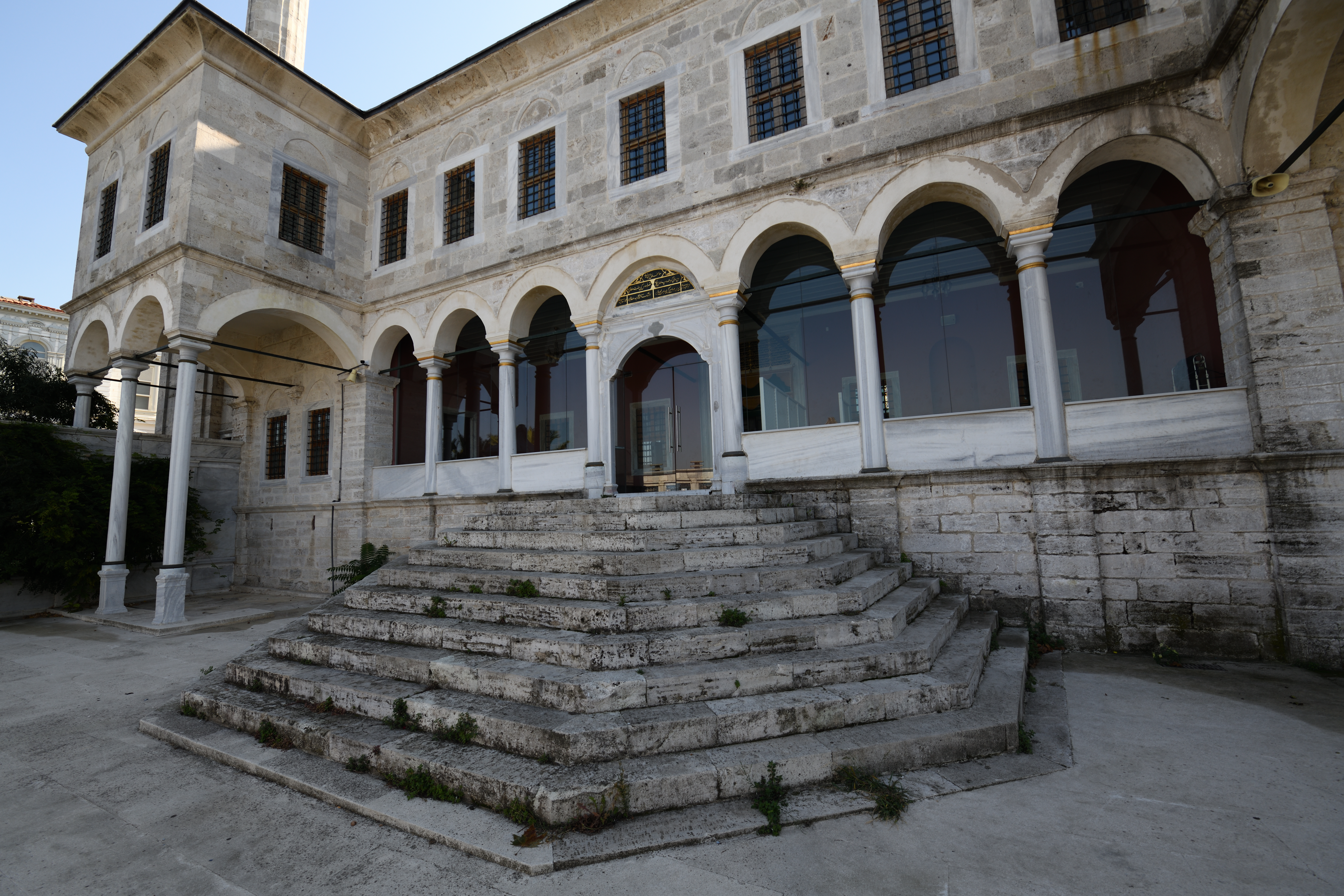
Front portico of the mosque, with the imperial pavilion above

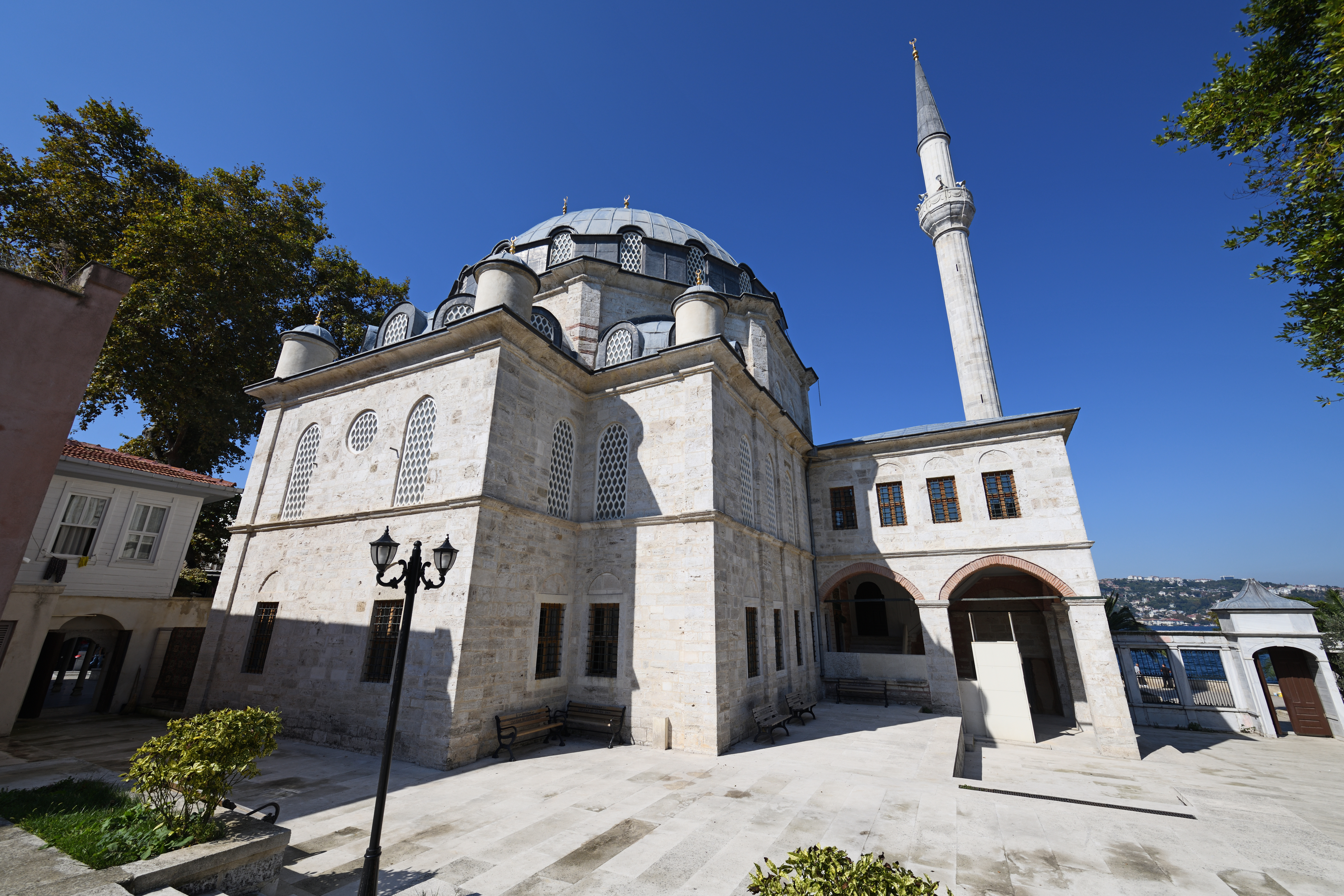
Back side of the mosque

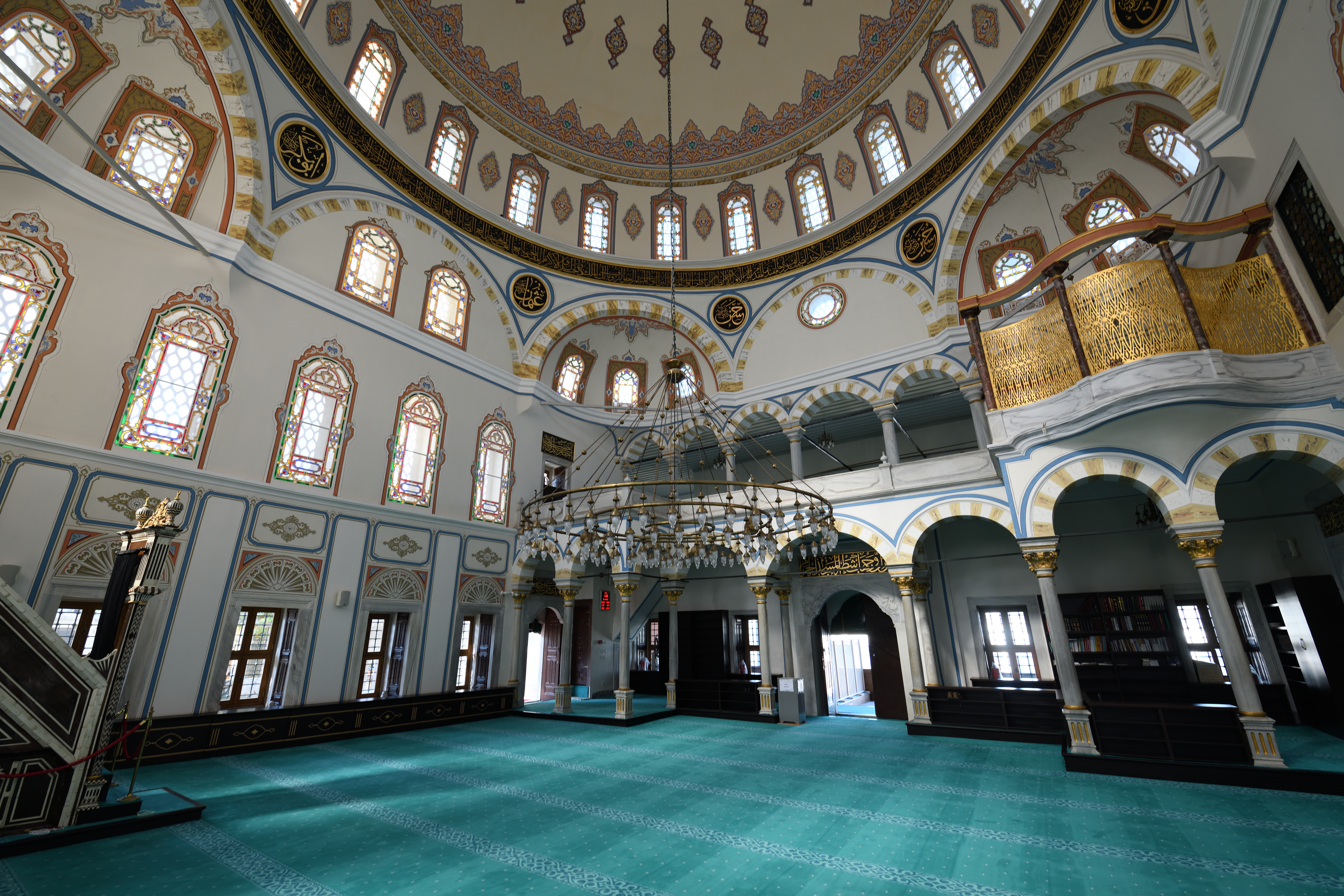
Interior of the mosque, looking towards the entrance

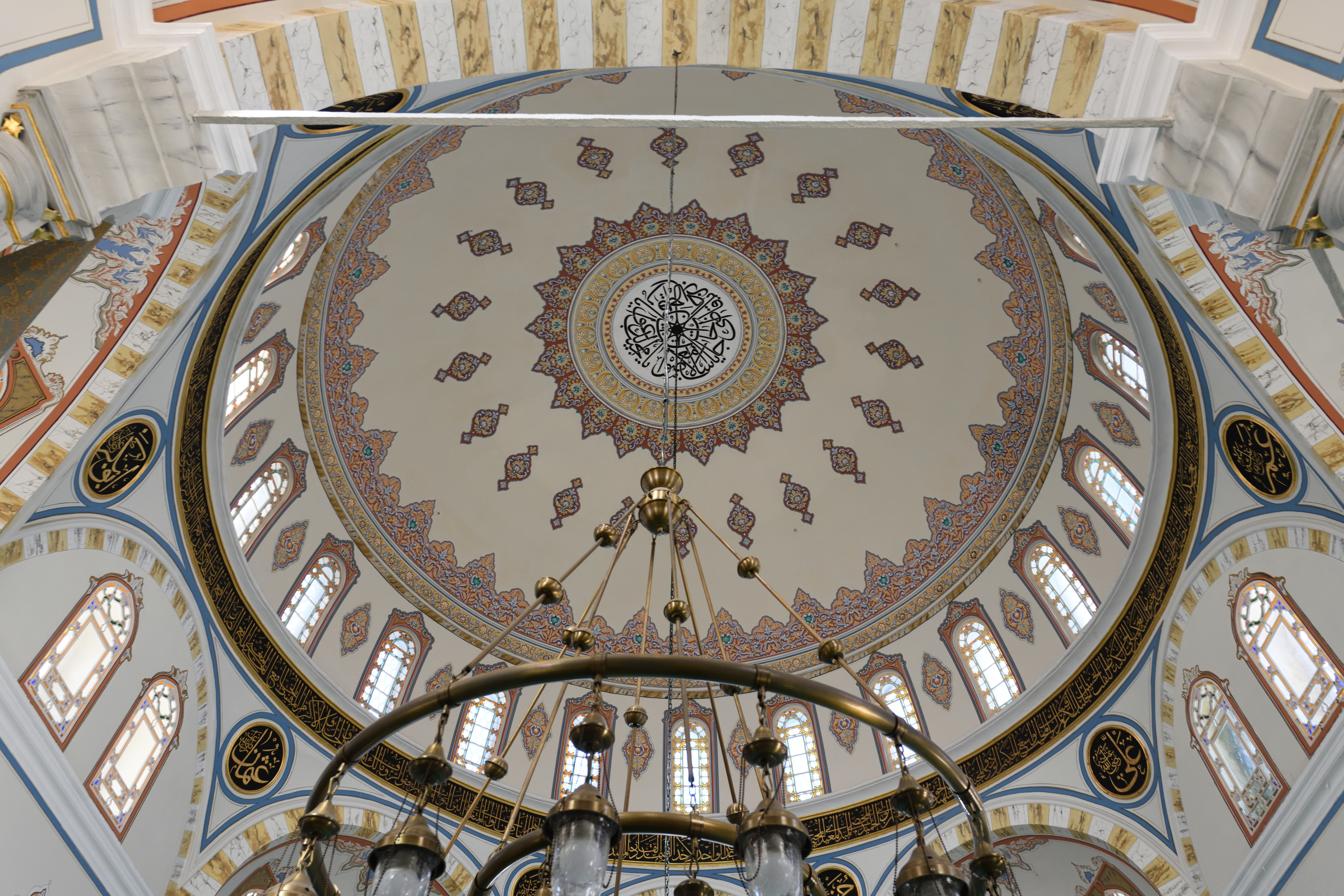
The main dome of the mosque

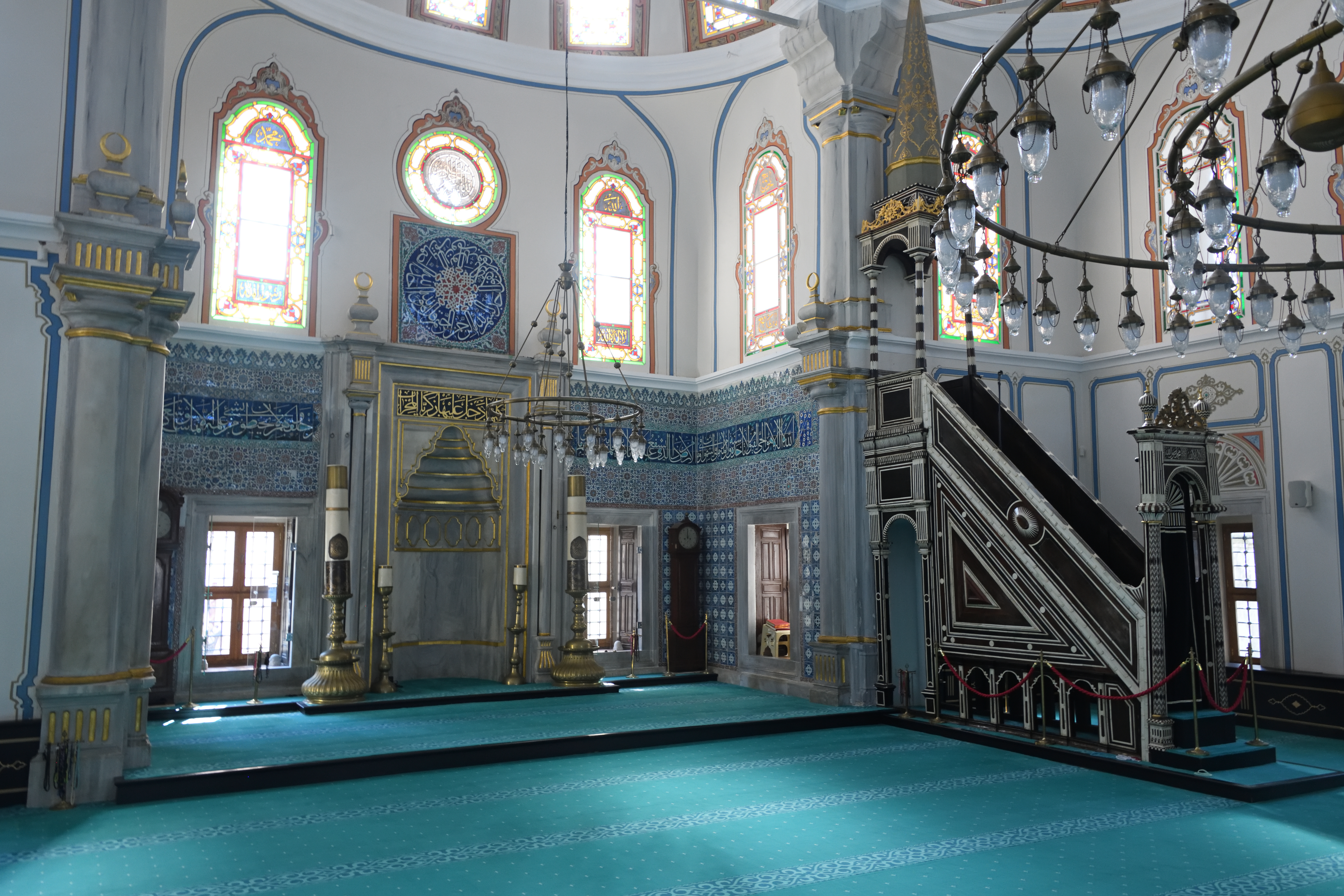
The mihrab area of the mosque

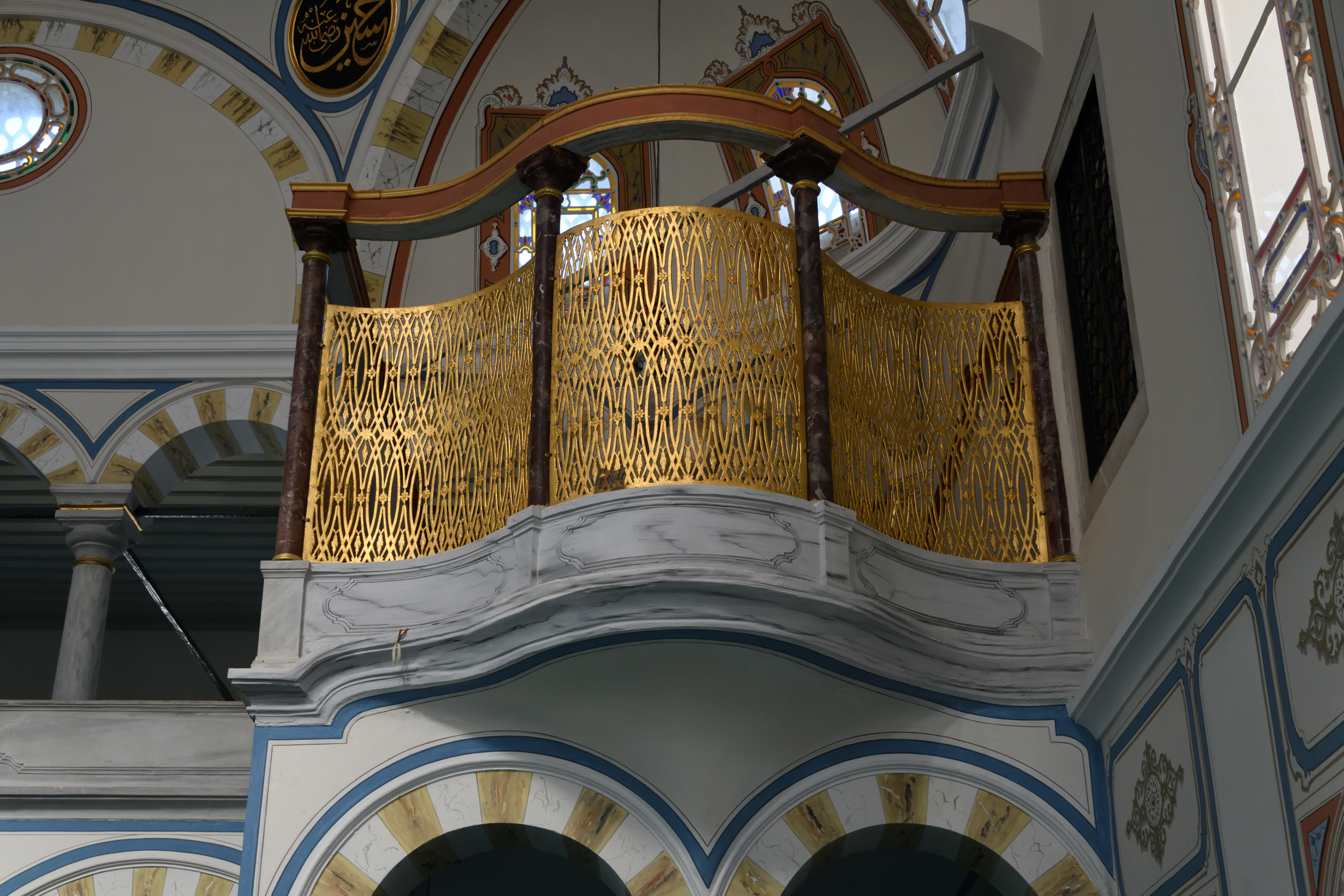
The sultan's loge

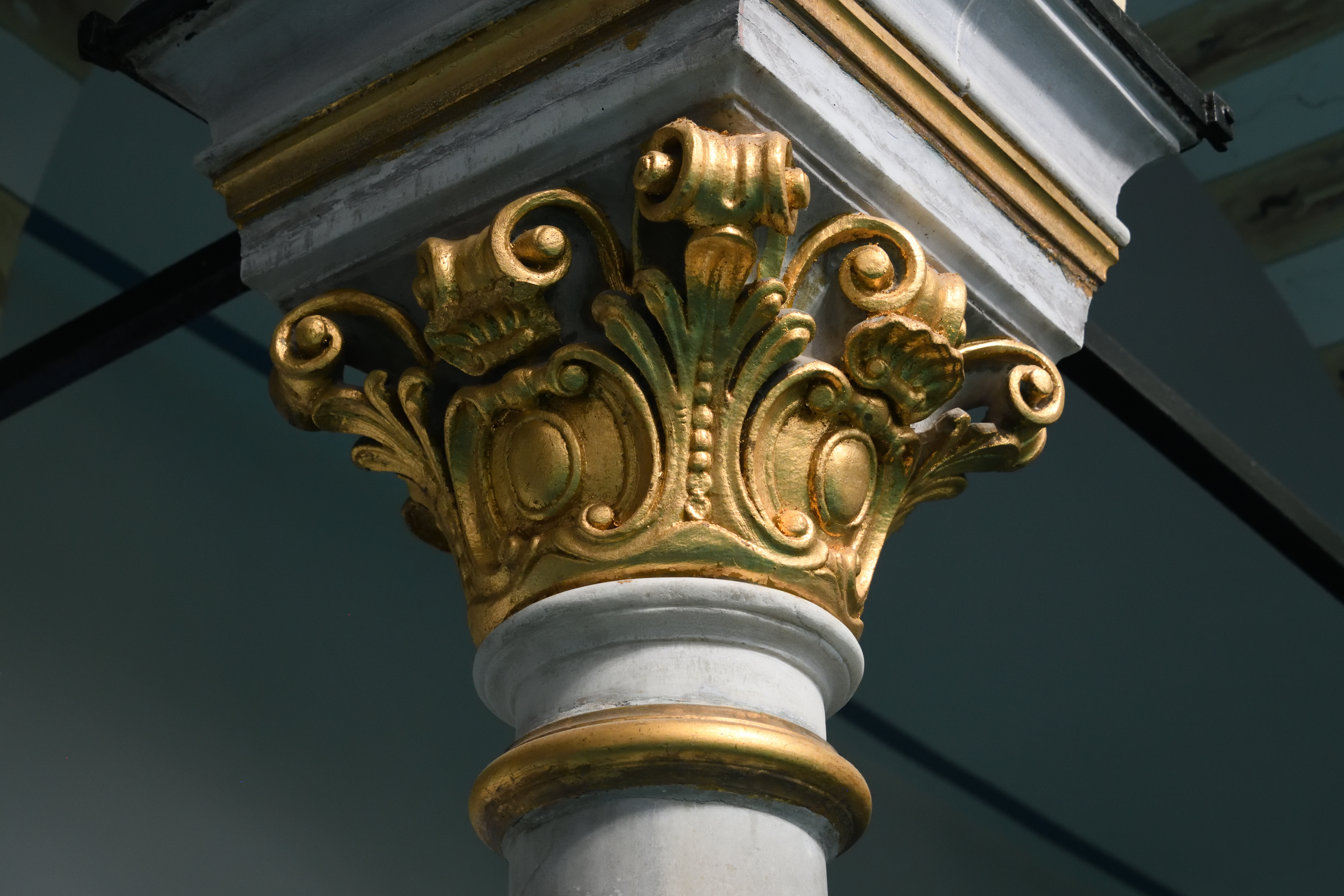
Example of the style of capitals inside the mosque

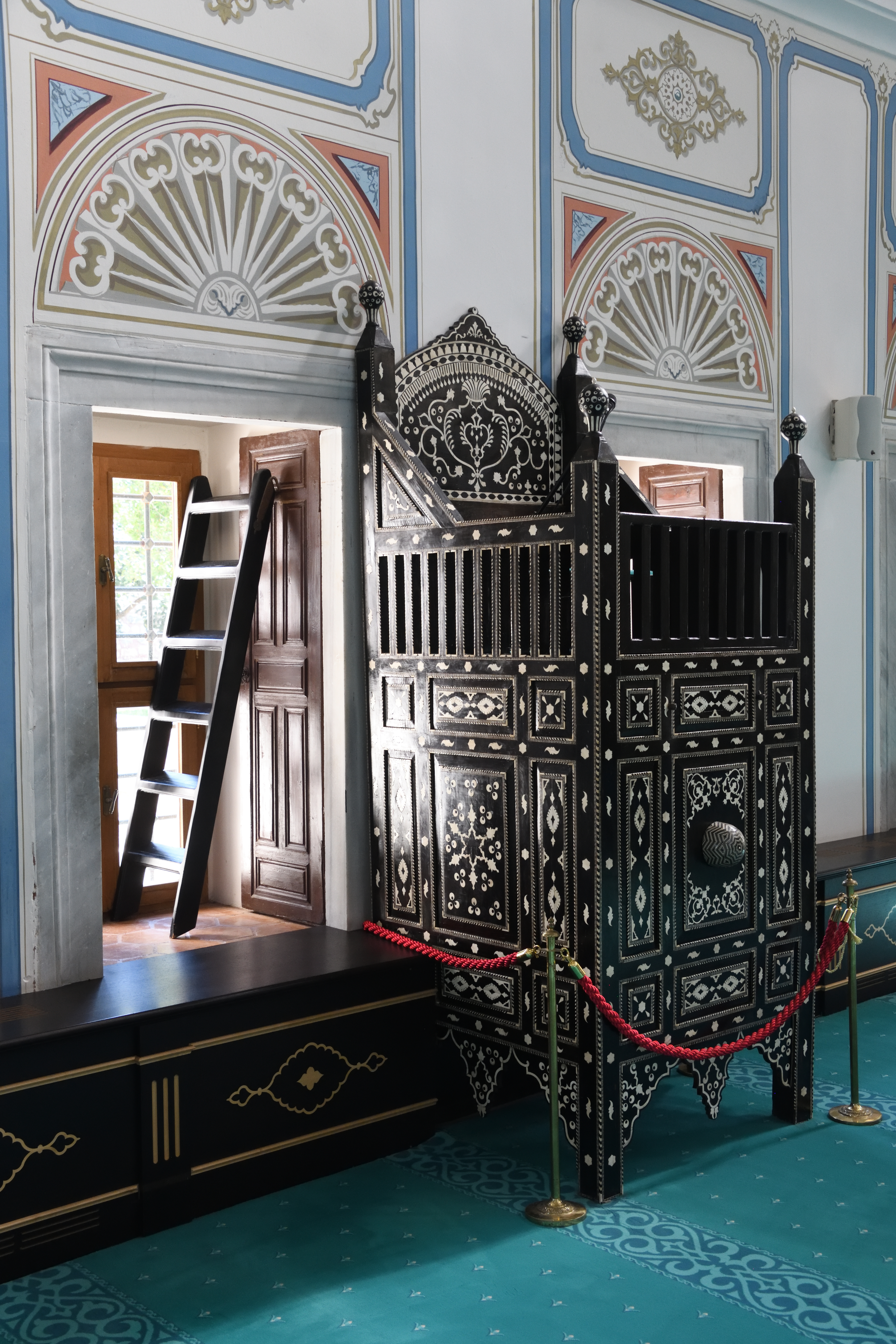
The kürsü (a preaching chair used on ordinary occasions), with fine inlay of ivory or bone.
