= Mihrişah Kadın =

Consort of Ottoman Sultan Ahmed III and mother of Sultan Mustafa III

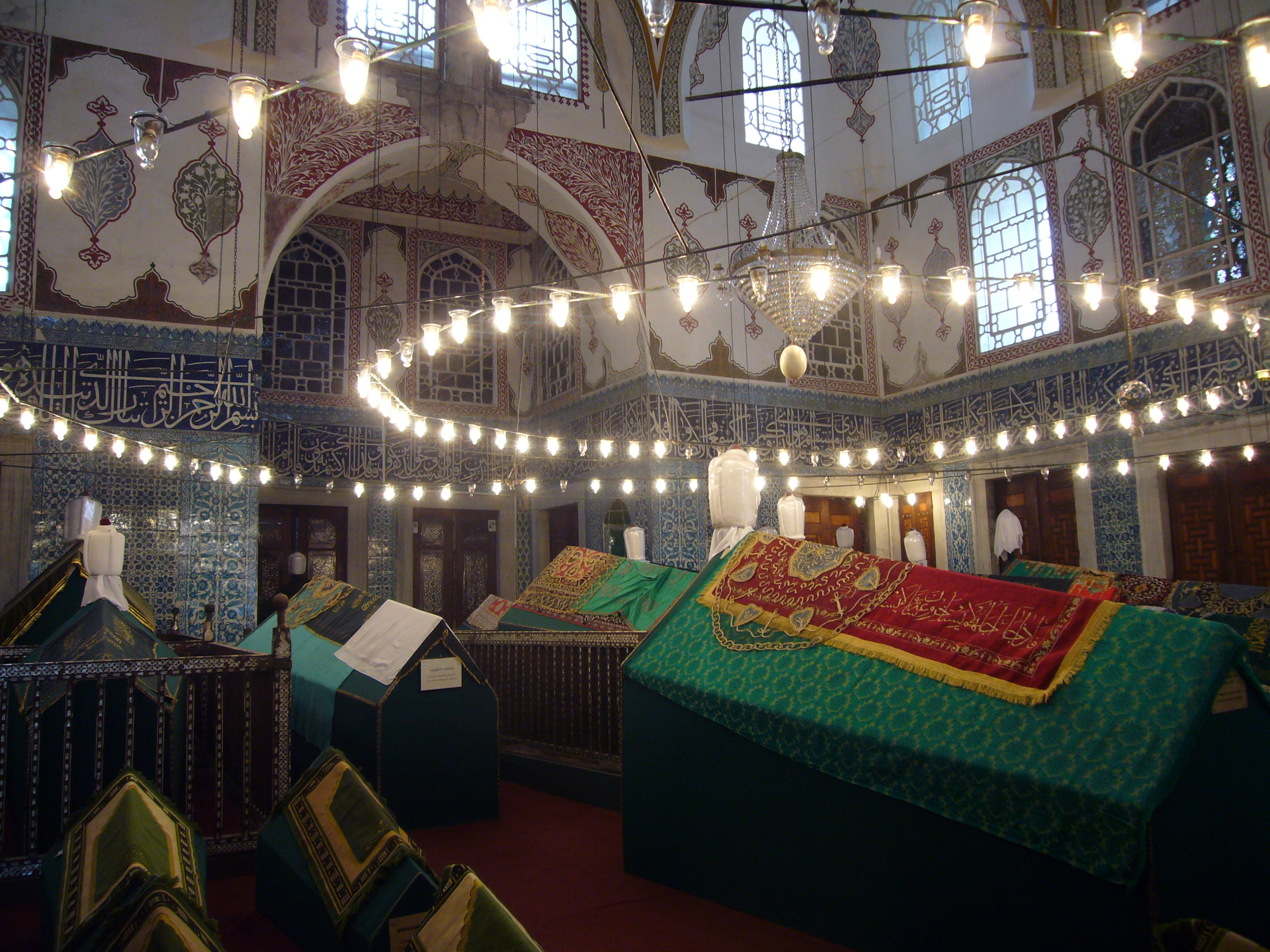
- The burial place of Mihrişah Kadın is located inside The Cedid Havatin outbuilding the mausoleum of Turhan Sultan, next to the tomb of Rabia Şermi Kadın, an other Ahmed's consorts and mother of Abdul Hamid I, in New Mosque at Eminönü in Istanbul.
- Died: April 1732; Eski Palace, Constantinople, Ottoman Empire (now Istanbul, Turkey)
- Burial: Imperial ladies Mausoleum, New Mosque, Eminönü, Istanbul
- Consort of: Ahmed III
- Issue: Şehzade Süleyman; Mustafa III; Şehzade Seyfeddin
Names
- Turkish: Emine Mihrişah Kadın; Ottoman Turkish: امینه مھرشاہ قادین
- Religion: Sunni Islam

Emine Mihrişah Kadın (Ottoman Turkish: امینه مھرشاہ قادین; died April 1732) was a consort of Sultan Ahmed III of the Ottoman Empire and the mother of Sultan Mustafa III.

== Life ==
After entering the ottoman imperial harem as a concubine, she was given the name Mihrişah (meaning "Sun of the Şah" in Persian).

The couple had four sons together. On 25 August 1710 she gave birth to her first son Şehzade Süleyman, and on 28 January 1717 to her second son Şehzade Mustafa. In 1728, she give birth to her third son, Şehzade Seyfeddin. The same year, when Süleyman was eighteen and Mustafa was eleven, she commissioned two fountains in Üsküdar, in their names.

Mihrişah paid a great deal of attention to the education of her sons. She was known as an extremely devout and spiritual woman. Much like her son Mustafa, she had great respect and devotion to Laleli Baba, an Ottoman spiritual figure. after whom the entire district is named after, in addition, the Laleli Mosque was also named in his honour.

Ahmed was deposed in 1730, and his nephew Mahmud I ascended the throne. Mihrişah along with other ladies and daughters of Ahmed's harem went to the Eski Palace.

== Death and aftermath ==
She died in April 1732, and was buried in the mausoleum of Imperial Ladies, New Mosque, Istanbul. She was buried next to her fellow consort Rabia Şermi Kadın.

Şehzade Mustafa ascended the throne as Mustafa III after Sultan Osman III's death in 1757. However, she was never Valide Sultan, as she had died twenty five years before Mustafa ascended the throne. Under the architect Mehmet Tahir Ağa, he commissioned the Ayazma Mosque in memory of his mother, and elder brother Şehzade Süleyman. A fountain is also present near her tomb.

== Issue ==
Together with Ahmed, Mihrişah had at least three sons:

- Şehzade Süleyman (25 August 1710 – 11 October 1732, buried in New Mosque, Istanbul), he died in the Kafes after two years of reclusion.
- Mustafa III (Edirne Palace, Edirne, 28 January 1717 - Istanbul, 21 January 1774, buried in Laleli Mosque, Fatih, Istanbul). 26th Sultan of the Ottoman Empire.
- Şehzade Seyfeddin (3 February 1728 – 1732, buried in New Mosque, Istanbul).

== See also ==
- Ottoman Empire
- Ottoman dynasty
- Ottoman family tree
- List of sultans of the Ottoman Empire
- Line of succession to the Ottoman throne
- Ottoman Emperors family tree (simplified)
- List of consorts of the Ottoman Sultans

== Sources ==
- Haskan, Mehmed Nermi (2001). Yüzyıllar Boyunca Üsküdar, Volume 3. Üsküdar Belediyesi. ISBN 978-9-759-76063-2.
- Sakaoğlu, Necdet (2008). Bü mülkün kadın sultanları: Vâlide sultanlar, hâtunlar, hasekiler, kadınefendiler, sultanefendiler. Oğlak Yayıncılık. ISBN 978-9-753-29623-6.
- Uluçay, Mustafa Çağatay (2011). Türk Tarih Kurumu yayınları. Türk Tarih Kurumu.
