= Tomb of Abdul Hamid I =

Resting place of Ottoman Sultan Abdul Hamid I located at Faith, Istanbul, Turkey

Coordinates: 41°00′55.8″N 28°58′26.9″E

- I. Abdülhamid Türbesi
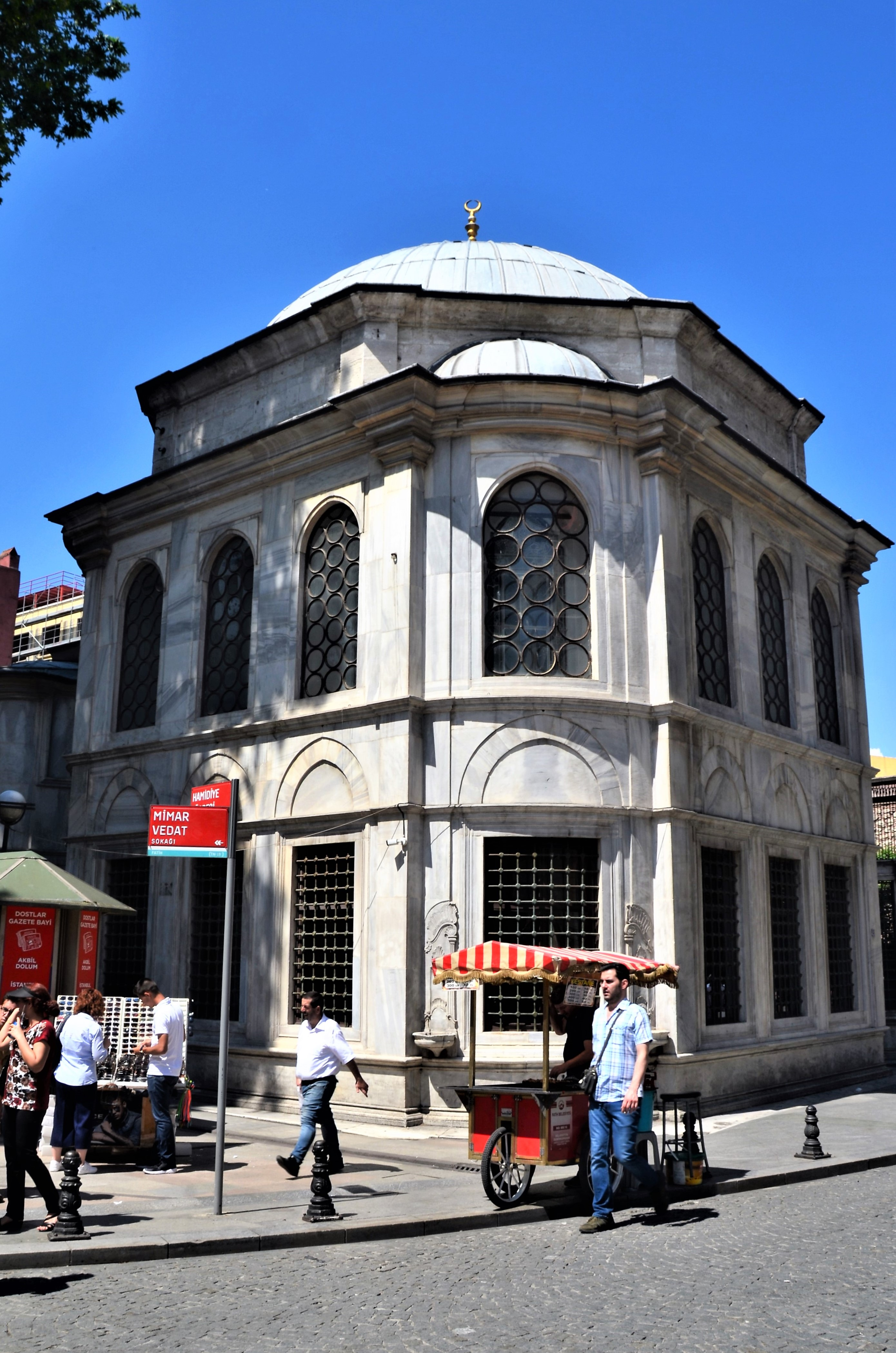
- Tomb of Abdul Hamid I in Eminönü quarter of Fatih, Istanbul.
- Interactive map of Tomb of Abdul Hamid I
- Location: Fatih, Istanbul, Turkey
- Designer: Mehmed Tahir Agha
- Type: Tomb
- Material: Marble
- Completion date: 1790
- Restored date: August 2009
- Dedicated to: Sultan Abdul Hamid I
- Sarcophagi: 20

The Tomb of Abdul Hamid I (Turkish: I. Abdülhamid Türbesi) is the final resting place of Ottoman Sultan Abdul Hamid I located at Fatih in Istanbul, Turkey.

== Overview ==
The tomb is situated on the corner of Hamidiye St. and Hamidiye Türbesi St. in Eminönü quarter of Fatih district in Istanbul. It was built for Sultan Abdul Hamid I (reigned 1774–1789) in 1790 by court architect Mehmed Tahir Agha as part of a 1776–1777 constructed almshouse complex. The tomb contains 20 sarcophagi in total. In addition to Abdul Hamid I, his assassinated son Sultan Mustafa IV (r. 1807–1808) rests in the tomb. Other occupants of the tomb are shahzadehs and sultanas, namely princes, princesses and consorts as relatives of the sultans.

== Architecture ==
The tomb building was designed in square-plan with rounded corners in Baroque style, and constructed completely in fine marbles. Austrian orientalist and historian Joseph von Hammer-Purgstall (1774–1856) praised the architecture of the tomb in his memoirs as worth seeing.

An inscription showing the 27th–30th āyāt of the Quranic surah Al-Fajr in thuluth calligraphy handwritten by Mehmed Emin is situated above the entrance gate of the tomb. The tomb's external appearance shows it as a two-story building with a wide molding cornice separating the floors. A done tops the structure. There are 26 windows in two rows around the building, which enable brightness in the interior. The script inside the medallion at the dome interior reads as "Oh! You, who know my status. I only trust in You, I take refuge in You" (Ottoman Turkish: Ya alimen bi-hali aleyke ittikali). The scripts of the medallions inside the dome carrying pendant vaults are "Ism-i Jalal", "Ism-i Nebi", "Chehar yar-i Güzin" and "Hasan and Husayn", the attributes of Allah, Muhammad, the first four caliphs and Hasan-Husayn respectively. The tomb's interior is decorated with carvings. On the northern wall, a marble panel with Qadam Rasul, footprint of the Prophet, is attached. A marble belt with Al-Mulk surah handwritten in thuluth script surround the interior.

== Restoration ==
The tomb was opened to public visit in August 2009 after completion of restoration works.
