= Dürrüşehvar Hanım (daughter of Abdülhamid I) =

Ottoman princess, daughter of Abdul Hamid I

- Born: c. 1767; Constantinople, Ottoman Empire
- Died: 11 May 1831 (aged 63–64); Constantinople, Ottoman Empire
- Burial: Nakşidil Sultan Mausoleum, Fatih, Istanbul, Turkey
- Spouse: Nisâncı Ahmed Naşîf Efendi (m. 1784; died 1789)
- Issue: Atiyetullah Hanım; Zeynep Hanım
Names
- Turkish: Ayşe Athermelik Dürrüşehvar Hanım; Ottoman Turkish: عایشه درشهوار خانم
- Dynasty: Ottoman
- Father: Abdul Hamid I
- Religion: Sunni Islam

Ayşe Athermelik Dürrüşehvar Hanım (Ottoman Turkish: عایشه درشھوار خانم; c. 1767 – 11 May 1831) was an Ottoman princess, she was the eldest daughter of Sultan Abdul Hamid I of the Ottoman Empire.

== Early life ==
Dürrüşehvar Hanım was born in 1767 in Istanbul. She was the daughter of Abdul Hamid I, when he was still a prince. Since it was forbidden for the princes to have children before their accession to the throne, she would have been killed if her paternity was known. However, Abdul Hamid managed to send her out of Istanbul and hid her in a safe place until he ascended the throne.

== Marriage ==
When her father ascended the throne in 1774, she was brought back to Istanbul where Abdul Hamid told everyone that she was his daughter. She however wasn't given the title of sultana, and thus she was considered as the adopted daughter of the sultan.

In 1784, when Dürrüşehvar was seventeen, her father married her to Nişancı Ahmed Nazif Efendi, the son of Hacı Selim Ağa. The marriage ceremony was held in Istanbul. The couple had two daughters, Atiyetullah Hanım and Zeynep Athermelik Hanım.

Ayşe Dürrüşehvar lived a comfortable and delightful life until her father's death. In 1789, her husband and father-in-law were executed by Selim III when he became the Sultan due to some serious allegations. Like other widowed princesses of her generation she didn't remarry.

Dürrüşehvar was responsible for transporting Nakşidil Sultan to Topkapı Palace as she became the new Valide Sultan.

== Death ==
Ayşe Athermelik Dürrüşehvar Hanım died on 11 May 1831 at the age of 64 in her palace in Kuruçeşme and was buried in the mausoleum of Nakşidil Sultan Mausoleum, Fatih, Istanbul.

== Issue ==
By her marriage, she had two daughters:

- Atiyetullah Hanım (c. 1785 – c. 1848). She married Molla Mehmed Bey (died on 4 September 1824), son of Koca Yusuf Pasha. They had a son, Ahmed Muhtar Molla Efendi (10 July 1807 – 22 December 1882), who was twice Shaykh al-Islām.
- Zeynep Athermelik Hanım (c. 1789 – c. 1805). She married Qadi Izmir Ismail Rahmi Efendi.

== Annotations ==
1. She was also called Athermelek

== Sources ==
- Sakaoğlu, Necdet (2008). Bu mülkün kadın sultanları: Vâlide sultanlar, hâtunlar, hasekiler, kadınefendiler, sultanefendiler. Oğlak Yayıncılık. ISBN 978-9-753-29623-6.
- Uluçay, Mustafa Çağatay (2011). Padişahların kadınları ve kızları. Ankara: Ötüken. ISBN 978-9-754-37840-5.
