= Abdul Hamid I =

Sultan of the Ottoman Empire from 1774 to 1789

- Custodian of the Two Holy Mosques; Khan
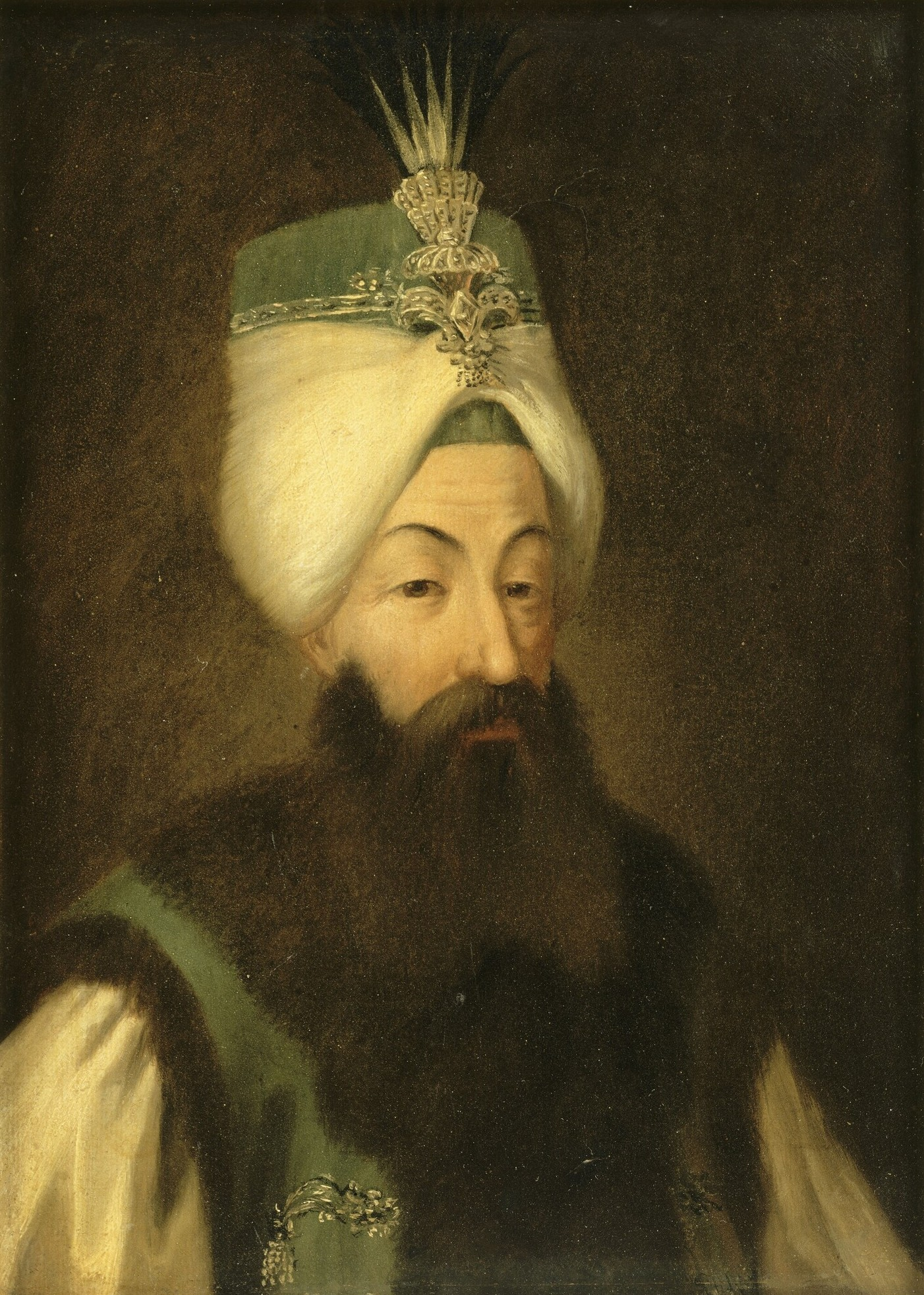
- Portrait by Ferdinando Tonioli, 1788

Sultan of the Ottoman Empire (Padishah)
- Reign: 21 January 1774 – 7 April 1789
- Predecessor: Mustafa III
- Successor: Selim III

Ottoman Caliph (Amir al-Mu'minin)
- Predecessor: Mustafa III
- Successor: Selim III
- Born: 20 March 1725; Topkapi Palace, Constantinople, Ottoman Empire
- Died: 7 April 1789 (aged 64); Constantinople, Ottoman Empire
- Burial: Tomb of Abdul Hamid I, Fatih, Istanbul
- Consorts: Hatice Ruhşah Kadın; Sineperver Kadın; Şebsefa Kadın; Nakşidil Kadın; Others
- Issue Among others: Dürrüşehvar Hanım; Esma Sultan; Mustafa IV; Mahmud II; Hibetullah Sultan
Names
- Abdülhamid Han bin Ahmed
- Dynasty: Ottoman
- Father: Ahmed III
- Mother: Rabia Şermi Kadın
- Religion: Sunni Islam
- Tughra

Abdülhamid I or Abdul Hamid I (Ottoman Turkish: عبد الحميد اول, Abdü’l-Ḥamīd-i evvel; Turkish: I. Abdülhamid; 20 March 1725 – 7 April 1789) was the sultan of the Ottoman Empire from 1774 to 1789. A devout and pacifist sultan, he inherited a bankrupt empire and sought military reforms, including overhauling the Janissaries and navy. Despite internal efforts and quelling revolts in Syria, Egypt, and Greece, his reign saw the critical loss of Crimea and defeat by Russia and Austria. The 1774 Treaty of Küçük Kaynarca granted Russia territorial and religious influence. He died soon after the fall of Ochakov in 1788.

== Early life ==
Abdul Hamid was born on 20 March 1725, in Constantinople. He was a younger son of Sultan Ahmed III (reigned 1703–1730) and his consort Şermi Kadın. Ahmed III abdicated his power in favour of his nephew Mahmud I, who was then succeeded by his brother Osman III, and Osman by Ahmed's elder son Mustafa III. As a potential heir to the throne, Abdul Hamid was imprisoned in comfort by his cousins and older brother, which was customary. His imprisonment lasted until 1767 and during this period, he received his early education from his mother Rabia Şermi, who taught him history and calligraphy.

== Reign ==
=== Accession ===
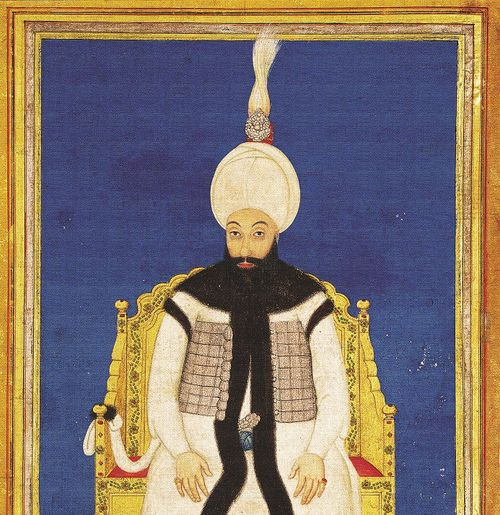
Portrait of Abdul Hamid I, 18th century

On the day of Mustafa's death on 21 January 1774, Abdul Hamid ascended to the throne with a ceremony held in the palace. The next day Mustafa III's funeral procession was held. The new sultan sent a letter to the Grand Vizier Serdar-ı Ekrem Muhsinzade Mehmed Pasha on the front and informed him to continue with the war against Russia. On 27 January 1774, he went to the Eyüp Sultan Mosque, where he was given the Sword of Osman.

=== Rule ===
Abdul Hamid's long imprisonment had left him indifferent to state affairs and malleable to the designs of his advisors. Yet he was also very religious and a pacifist by nature. At his accession, the financial straits of the treasury were such that the usual donative could not be given to the Janissary Corps. The new Sultan told the Janissaries "There are no longer gratuities in our treasury, as all of our soldier sons should learn."

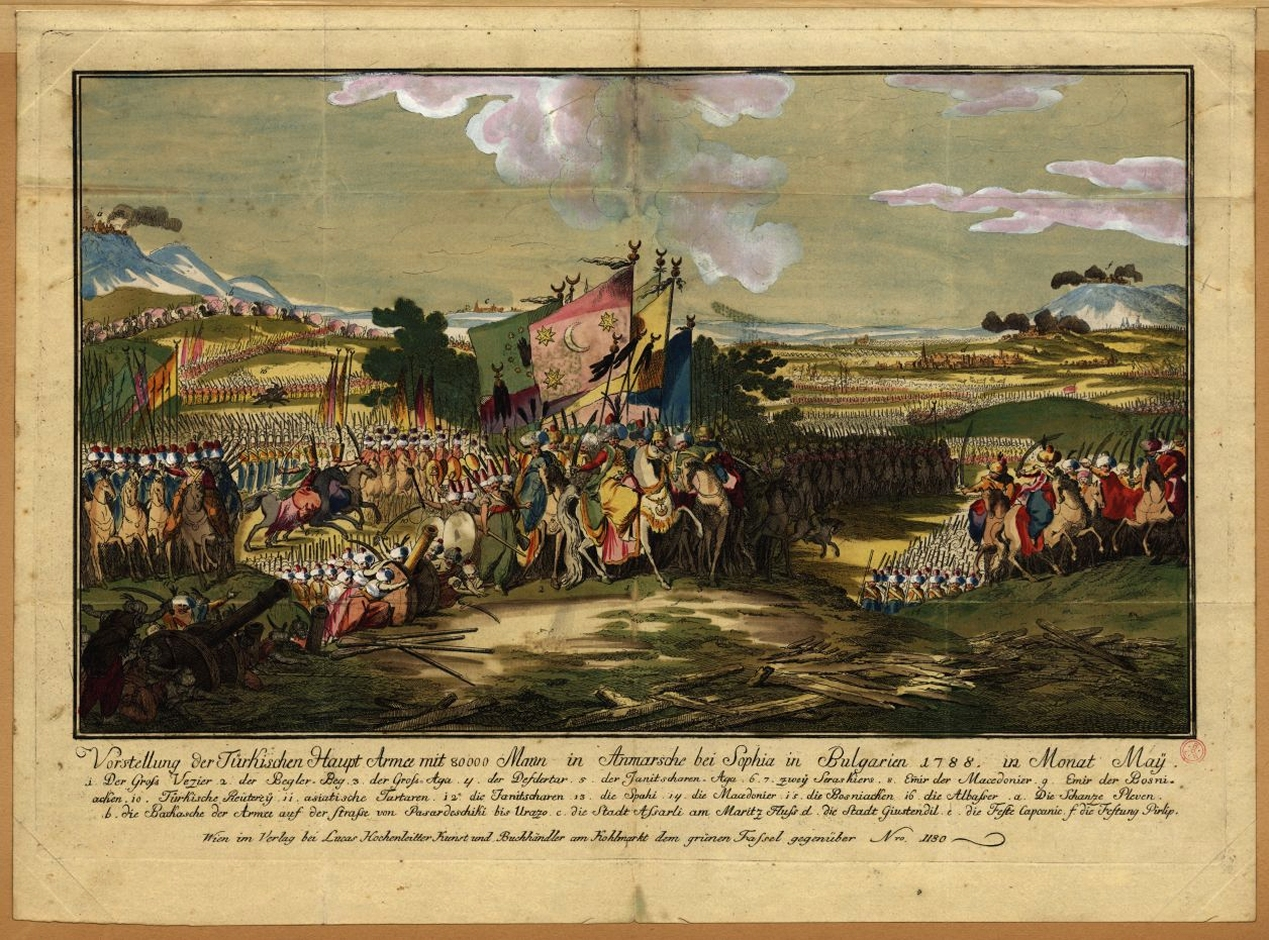
The Ottoman Army advances from Sofia, its largest garrison in Rumelia, in the year 1788.

Abdul Hamid sought to reform the Empire's armed forces including the Janissary corps and the navy. He also established a new artillery corps and is credited with the creation of the Imperial Naval Engineering School.

Abdul Hamid tried to strengthen Ottoman rule over Syria, Egypt and Iraq. However, small successes against rebellions in Syria and the Morea could not compensate for the loss of the Crimean Peninsula, which had become nominally independent in 1774 but was in practice actually controlled by Russia.

Russia repeatedly exploited its position as protector of Eastern Christians to interfere in the Ottoman Empire. Ultimately, the Ottomans declared war against Russia in 1787. Austria soon joined Russia. Turkey initially held its own in the conflict, but on 6 December 1788, Ochakov fell to Russia (all of its inhabitants being massacred). Upon hearing this, Abdul Hamid I had a stroke, which resulted in his death.

In spite of his failures, Abdul Hamid was regarded as the most gracious Ottoman Sultan. He personally directed the fire brigade during the Constantinople fire of 1782. He was admired by the people for his religious devotion and was even called a Veli ("saint"). He also outlined a reform policy, supervised the government closely, and worked with statesmen.

Abdul Hamid I turned to internal affairs after the war with Russia ended. He tried to suppress internal revolts through Algerian Gazi Hasan Pasha, and to regulate the reform works through Silâhdar Seyyid Mehmed Pasha (Karavezir) and Halil Hamid Pasha.

In Syria, the rebellion led by Daher al-Umar, who cooperated with the admirals of the Russian navy in the Mediterranean, benefiting from the confusion caused by the Russian expedition of 1768 Russian campaign, and suppressed the rebellion in Egypt in 1775, as well as the Kölemen who were in rebellion in Egypt, was brought to an end. On the other hand, the confusion in Peloponnese was ended, and calm was achieved. Kaptanıderyâ Gazi Hasan Pasha and Cezzâr Ahmed Pasha played an important role in suppressing all these events.

=== Treaty of Küçük Kaynarca ===
Despite his pacific inclinations, the Ottoman Empire was forced to renew the ongoing war with Russia almost immediately. This led to complete Ottoman defeat at Kozludzha and the humiliating Treaty of Küçük Kaynarca, signed on 21 July 1774. The Ottomans ceded territory to Russia, and also the right to intervene on behalf of the Orthodox Christians in the Empire.

With the Treaty of Küçük Kaynarca, the territory left, as well as Russia's ambassador at the Istanbul level and an authorised representative, this ambassador's participation in other ceremonies at the state ceremonies, the right to pass through the Straits to Russia, as the envoys of the Russian envoy were given immunity. Marketing opportunities for all kinds of commodities in Istanbul and other ports, as well as the full commercial rights of England and France, were given. It was also in the treaty that the Russian state had a church built in Galata. Under the circumstances, this church would be open to the public, referred to as the Russo-Greek Church, and forever under the protection of Russian ambassadors in Istanbul.

=== Relations with Tipu Sultan ===
In 1789, Tipu Sultan, ruler of the Sultanate of Mysore sent an embassy to Abdul Hamid, urgently requesting assistance against the British East India Company, and proposed an offensive and defensive alliance. Abdul Hamid informed the Mysore ambassadors that the Ottomans were still entangled and exhausted from the ongoing war with Russia and Austria.

=== Architectural works and projects ===
Abdul Hamid I, left behind many architectural works, mostly in Istanbul. The most important of these is his mausoleum (I. Abdülhamid Türbesi) in Sirkeci erected 1776/77. He built a fountain, an imaret (soup kitchen), a madrasah, and a library next to this building. The books in the library are kept in the Süleymaniye Library today and the madrasah is used as a stock exchange building. During the construction of the Vakıf Inn, the imaret, the fountain, removed by construction and transferred to the corner of Zeynep Sultan Mosque opposite Gülhane Park.

In addition to these works, in 1778 he built the Beylerbeyi Mosque, dedicated to Râbia Şermi Kadın, and built fountains in Çamlıca Kısıklı Square. He additionally built a mosque, a fountain, a bath, and shops around Emirgi in Emirgân in 1783, and another one for Hümâşah Sultan and his son Mehmed. In addition to these, there is a fountain next to Neslişah Mosque in Istinye, and another fountain on the embankment between Dolmabahçe and Kabataş.

== Personal life ==
=== Character and personality ===
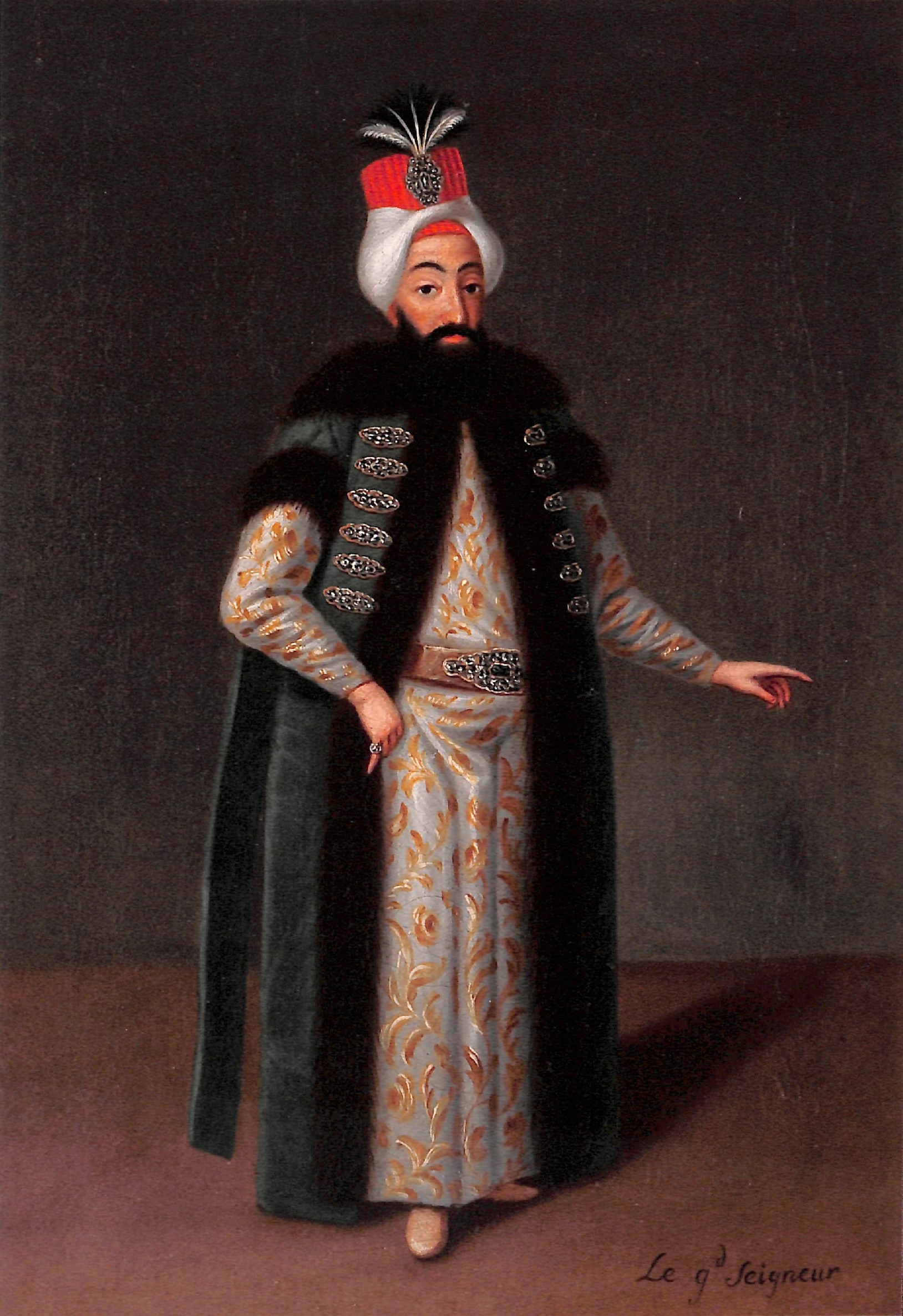
Portrait of Abdul Hamid I, c. 1780

He wrote down the troubles he saw before, to the grand vizier or to the governor of his empire. He accepted the invitations of his grand vizier and went to his mansions, followed by the reading of the Quran. He was humble and a religious Sultan.

It is known that Abdul Hamid I was fond of his children, was interested in family life, and spent the summer months in Karaağaç, Beşiktaş with his consorts, sons and daughters. His daughter Esma Sultan's dressing styles, her passion for entertainment, and her journey to the objects with her journeymen and concubines have set an example for Istanbul ladies.

=== Family ===
Abdülhamid I is famous for having concubines even during the period of confinement in the Kafes, thus violating the rules of the harem. From these relationships at least one daughter was conceived, secretly born and raised outside the Palace until the enthronement of Abdülhamid, when she was accepted at court as the sultan's "adopted daughter".

==== Consorts ====
Abdülhamid I had at least fourteen consorts:

- Ayşe Kadın. BaşKadin (first consort) until her death in 1775. She was buried in Yeni Cami.
- Hace Hatice Ruhşah Kadın. BaşKadin after Ayşe's death. She was Abdulhamid's most beloved consort. She was his concubine even before he became sultan. Five incredibly intense love letters that the sultan wrote to her around that time have been preserved. Mother of at least a son. After Abdülhamid's death she made the pilgrimage to Mecca by proxy, which earned her the name "Hace". She died in 1808 and was buried in mausoleum Abdülhamid I.
- Binnaz Kadın (c.1743 - May/June 1823), also known as Beynaz Kadın. She had previously been the consort of Abdulhamid's predecessor, Mustafa III. With no children of either of them, after Abdülhamid's death she married Çayırzade İbrahim Ağa. She was buried in the garden of the Hamidiye Mausoleum.
- Nevres Kadın. Before she became a consort she was the treasurer of the harem. She died in 1797.
- Ayşe Sineperver Kadın. She is the mother of at least two sons, including Mustafa IV, and two daughters. She was Valide sultan for less than a year before the deposition of her son, and spent the rest of her life in her daughter's palace. She died on 11 December 1828.
- Mehtabe Kadın. Initially a Kalfa (servant) of the harem, she became consort through the favour of kızları agasi Beşir Ağa. She died in 1807.
- Muteber Kadın. Called also Mutebere Kadın. Mother of at least a son. Her personal seal read: “ Devletlü beşinci Muteber Kadın Hazretleri ”. She died on 16 May 1837 and was buried in the Abdülhamid I mausoleum.
- Fatma Şebsefa Kadın. Also called Şebisefa, Şebsafa or Şebisafa Kadin. Mother of at least a son and three daughters. She owned farms in Thessaloniki, which she left to her daughter when she died in 1805. She was buried near the Zeyrek Mosque.
- Nakşidil Kadın. Originally Georgian or Circassian, she became famous for the disproved legend that she was actually the disappeared Aimée du Buc de Rivéry, distant cousin of the Empress Josephine Bonaparte. She is a mother of two sons and a daughter, including Mahmud II. She died on 28 July and was buried in her mausoleum inside her Fatih Mosque.
- Hümaşah Kadın. Mother of at least a son, she built a fountain near Dolmabahçe and another in Emirgân. She died in 1778 and was buried in the Yeni Cami.
- Dilpezir Kadın. She died in 1809 and was buried in the garden of the Hamidiye Mausoleum.
- Mislinayab Kadın. She was buried in the Nakşıdil Valide Sultan mausoleum.
- Mihriban Kadın. Misidentified by Oztüna as Esma Sultan's mother, she died in 1812 and was buried in Edirne.
- Nükhetseza Hanım. BaşIkbal, she was the youngest consort. She died in 1851.

==== Sons ====
Abdülhamid I had at least eleven sons:

- Şehzade Abdüllah (1 January 1776 – 1 January 1776). Born dead, he was buried in Yeni Cami.
- Şehzade Mehmed (22 August 1776 – 20 February 1781) - with Hümaşah Kadın. Died of smallpox, he was buried in the Hamidiye mausoleum.
- Şehzade Ahmed (8 December 1776 – 18 November 1778) - with Ayşe Sineperver Kadın. Buried in the Hamidiye mausoleum.
- Şehzade Abdürrahman (8 September 1777 – 8 September 1777). Born dead, he was buried in the Yeni Cami.
- Şehzade Süleyman (13 March 1778 – 19 January 1786) - with Muteber Kadın. Died of smallpox, he was buried in the Hamidiye mausoleum.
- Şehzade Ahmed (1779 - 1780). He was buried in the Yeni Cami.
- Şehzade Abdülaziz (19 June 1779 – 19 June 1779) - with Ruhşah Kadin. Born dead, he was buried in the Yeni Cami.
- Mustafa IV (8 September 1779 – 16 November 1808) - with Ayşe Sineperver Kadın. 29th Sultan of the Ottoman Empire, was executed after less than a year.
- Şehzade Mehmed Nusret (20 September 1782 – 23 October 1785) - with Şebsefa Kadın. Her mother dedicated a mosque to his memory. He was buried in the Hamidiye mausoleum.
- Şehzade Seyfullah Murad (22 October 1783 – 21 January 1785) - with Nakşidil Kadin. He was buried in the Hamidiye mausoleum.
- Mahmud II (20 July 1785 – 1 July 1839) - with Nakşidil Kadin. 30th Sultan of the Ottoman Empire.

==== Daughters ====
Abdülhamid I had at least sixteen daughters:

- Ayşe Athermelik Dürrüşehvar Hanım (c.1767 - 11 May 1826). Called also Athermelek. She was conceived while her father was still Şehzade and confined in the Kafes, thus violating the rules of the harem. Her mother was smuggled out of the palace and her birth kept secret, otherwise both would have been killed. When Abdülhamid, who adored her, ascended the throne, he returned her to court with the status of "adopted daughter", which gave her the rank of imperial princess as the other daughters, but he could not grant her the title of "Sultan", so she never came. fully equal to the stepsisters. She married once and had two daughters.
- Hatice Sultan (12 January 1776 – 8 November 1776). First daughter born after her father's accession to the throne, her birth was celebrated for ten days. She was buried in the Yeni Cami.
- Ayşe Sultan (30 July 1777 – 9 September 1777). She was buried in the Yeni Cami.
- Esma Sultan (17 July 1778 – 4 June 1848) - with Ayşe Sineperver Kadın. She nicknamed Küçük Esma (Esma the younger ) to distinguish her from her aunt, Esma the eldest. Close to her brother Mustafa IV, she attempted to put him back on the throne with the help of their half-sister Hibetullah Sultan, but eventually she became the new sultan's favorite sister, his half-brother Mahmud II, which gave her a degree of freedom never before granted to a princess. She married once but had no children.
- Melekşah Sultan (19 February 1779 - 1780).
- Rabia Sultan (20 March 1780 – 28 June 1780). She was buried in the Hamidiye mausoleum.
- Aynışah Sultan (9 July 1780 – 28 July 1780). She was buried in the Hamidiye mausoleum.
- Melekşah Sultan (28 January 1781 – 24 December 1781). She was buried in the Hamidiye mausoleum.
- Rabia Sultan (10 August 1781 – 3 October 1782). She was buried in the Hamidiye mausoleum.
- Fatma Sultan (12 December 1782 – 11 January 1786) - with Ayşe Sineperver Kadın. Died of smallpox, she was buried in the Hamidiye mausoleum. A fountain was dedicated to her memory.
- Hatice Sultan (6 October 1784 - 1784).
- Alemşah Sultan (11 October 1784 – 10 March 1786) - with Şebsefa Kadın. Her birth was celebrated for three days. She was buried in the Hamidiye mausoleum.
- Saliha Sultan (27 November 1786 – 10 April 1788) - with Nakşidil Kadin. She was buried in the Hamidiye mausoleum.
- Emine Sultan (4 February 1788 – 9 March 1791) - with Şebsefa Kadın. Her father strongly hoped she would live and showered her with gifts, including the properties of her later aunt Esma Sultan and a court of Chechen entertainers. She died of smallpox and was buried in the Hamidiye mausoleum.
- Zekiye Sultan (? - 20 March 1788). She died in infancy.
- Hibetullah Sultan (16 March 1789 – 19 September 1841) - with Şebsefa Kadın. She married once but had no children. She collaborated with her half-sister Esma Sultan to restore Mustafa IV, Esma's brother and Hibetullah's half-brother, to the throne, but she was discovered by Mahmud II, the new sultan and also their half-brother, and placed under house arrest for life, unable to communicate with anybody.

== Death ==
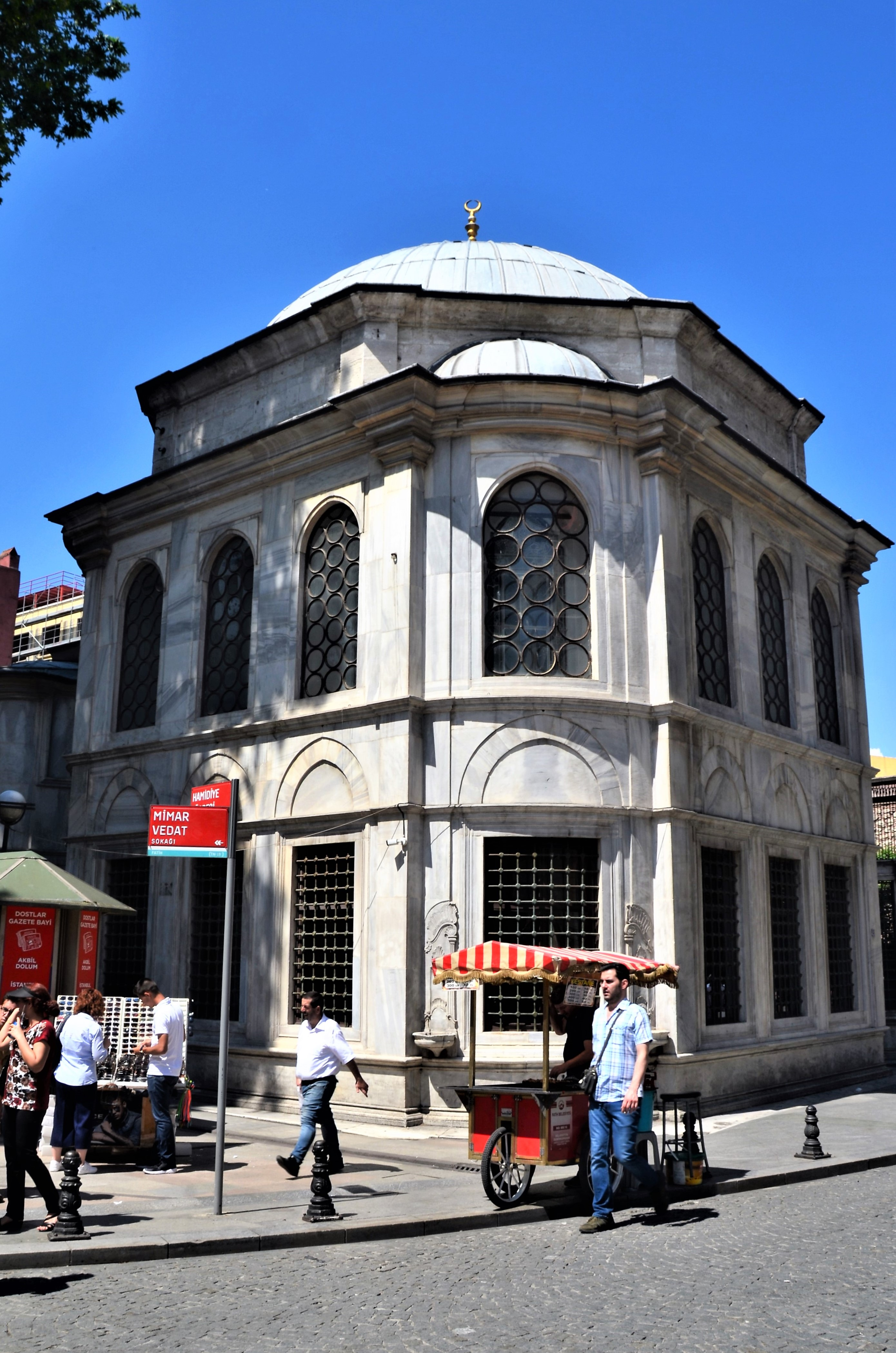
Tomb of Abdul Hamid I in Eminönü quarter of Fatih, Istanbul.

Abdul Hamid died on 7 April 1789, at the age of sixty-four, in Istanbul. He was buried in Bahcekapi, a tomb he had built for himself.

He bred Arabian horses with great passion. One breed of Küheylan Arabians was named "Küheylan Abdülhamid" after him.

== Sources ==
- Haskan, Mehmet Nermi (1 January 2018). Hamîd-i Evvel Külliyesi ve Çevresi. Istanbul Ticaret Borsasi. ISBN 978-6-051-37663-9.
- Sakaoğlu, Necdet (2015). Bu Mülkün Sultanları. Alfa Yayıncılık. ISBN 978-6-051-71080-8.
- Sarıcaoğlu, Fikret (1997). Hatt-ı Humayunlarına göre Bir Padişah'ın Portresi: Sultan I. Abdülhamid (1774–1789).

Abdul Hamid I House of Osman Born: 20 March 1725 Died: 7 April 1789[aged 64]
Regnal titles
Preceded by Mustafa III	Sultan of the Ottoman Empire; 21 Jan 1774 – 7 Apr 1789	Succeeded by Selim III
Sunni Islam titles
Preceded by Mustafa III	Caliph of the Ottoman Caliphate; 21 Jan 1774 – 7 Apr 1789	Succeeded by Selim III
