= Mustafa III =

Sultan of the Ottoman Empire from 1757 to 1774

- Custodian of the Two Holy Mosques
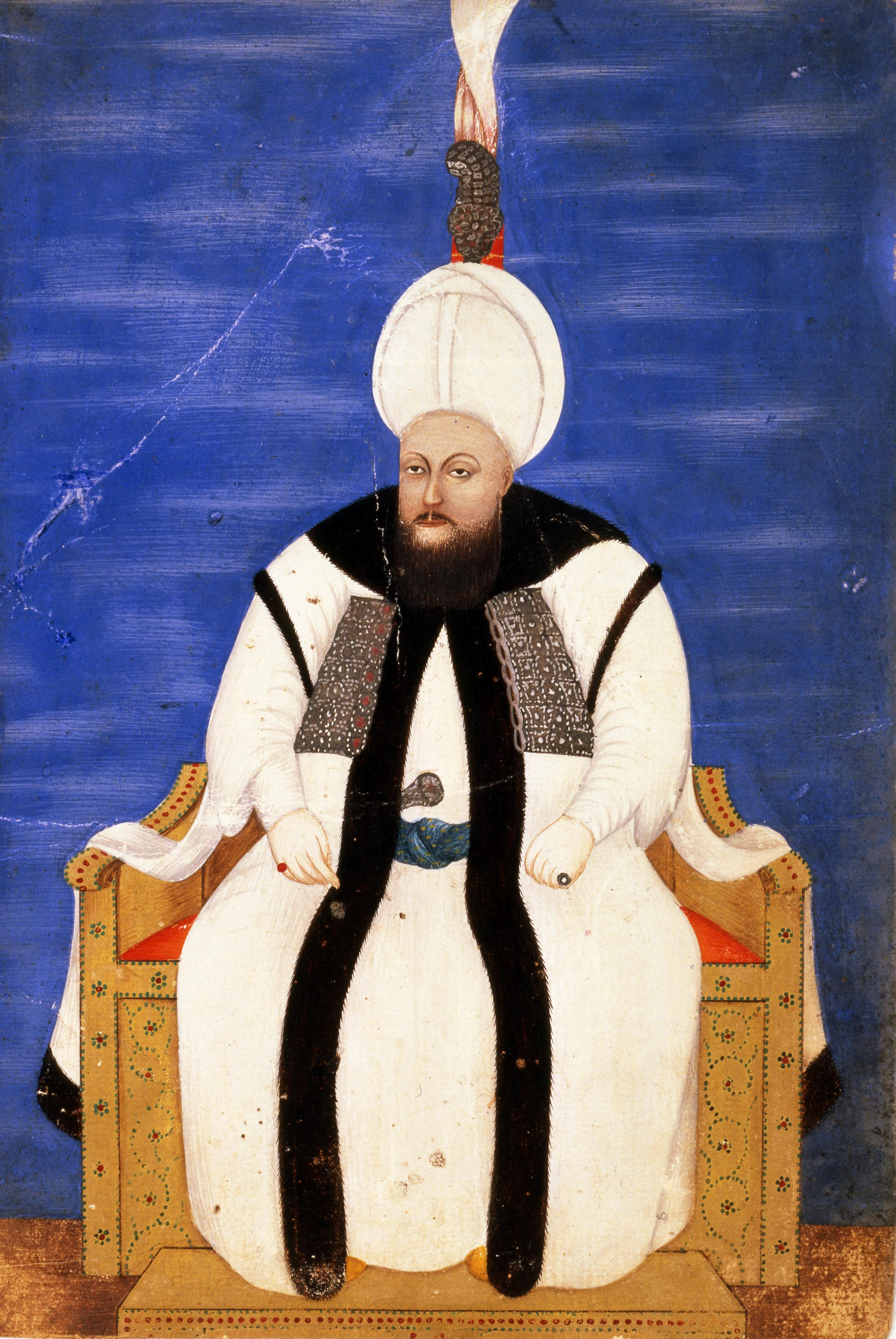
- Portrait, 1770s

Sultan of the Ottoman Empire (Padishah)
- Reign: 30 October 1757 – 21 January 1774
- Predecessor: Osman III
- Successor: Abdul Hamid I

Ottoman Caliph (Amir al-Mu'minin)
- Predecessor: Osman III
- Successor: Abdul Hamid I
- Born: 28 January 1717; Edirne Palace, Edirne, Ottoman Empire
- Died: 21 January 1774 (aged 56); Topkapı Palace, Constantinople, Ottoman Empire
- Burial: Laleli Mosque, Fatih, Istanbul
- Consorts: Aynülhayat Kadın; Mihrişah Kadin; Adilşah Kadın; Others
- Issue Among others: Şah Sultan; Selim III; Beyhan Sultan; Hatice Sultan
Names
- Mustafa bin Ahmed
- Dynasty: Ottoman
- Father: Ahmed III
- Mother: Mihrişah Kadın
- Religion: Sunni Islam
- Tughra

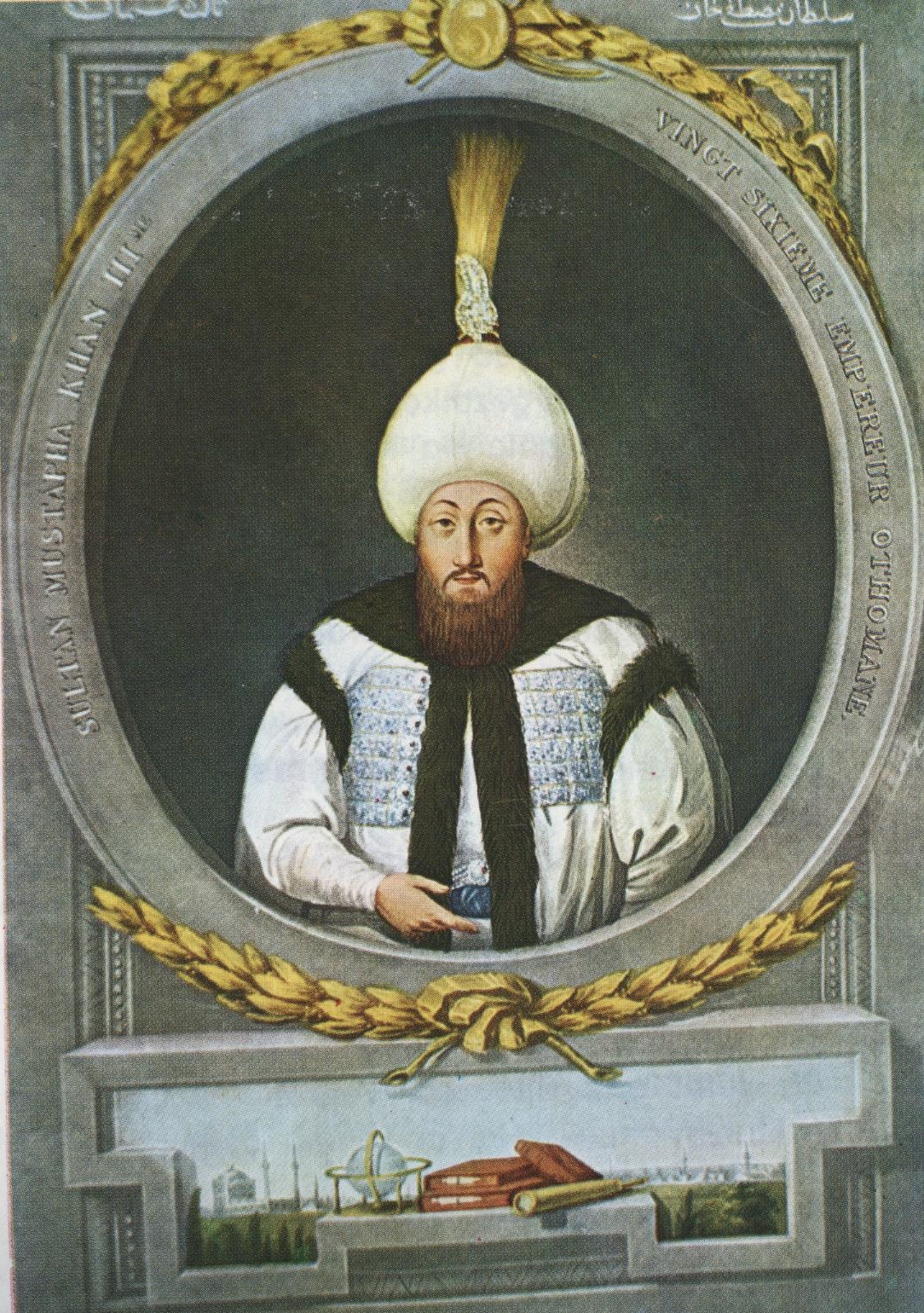
Sultan Mustafa III

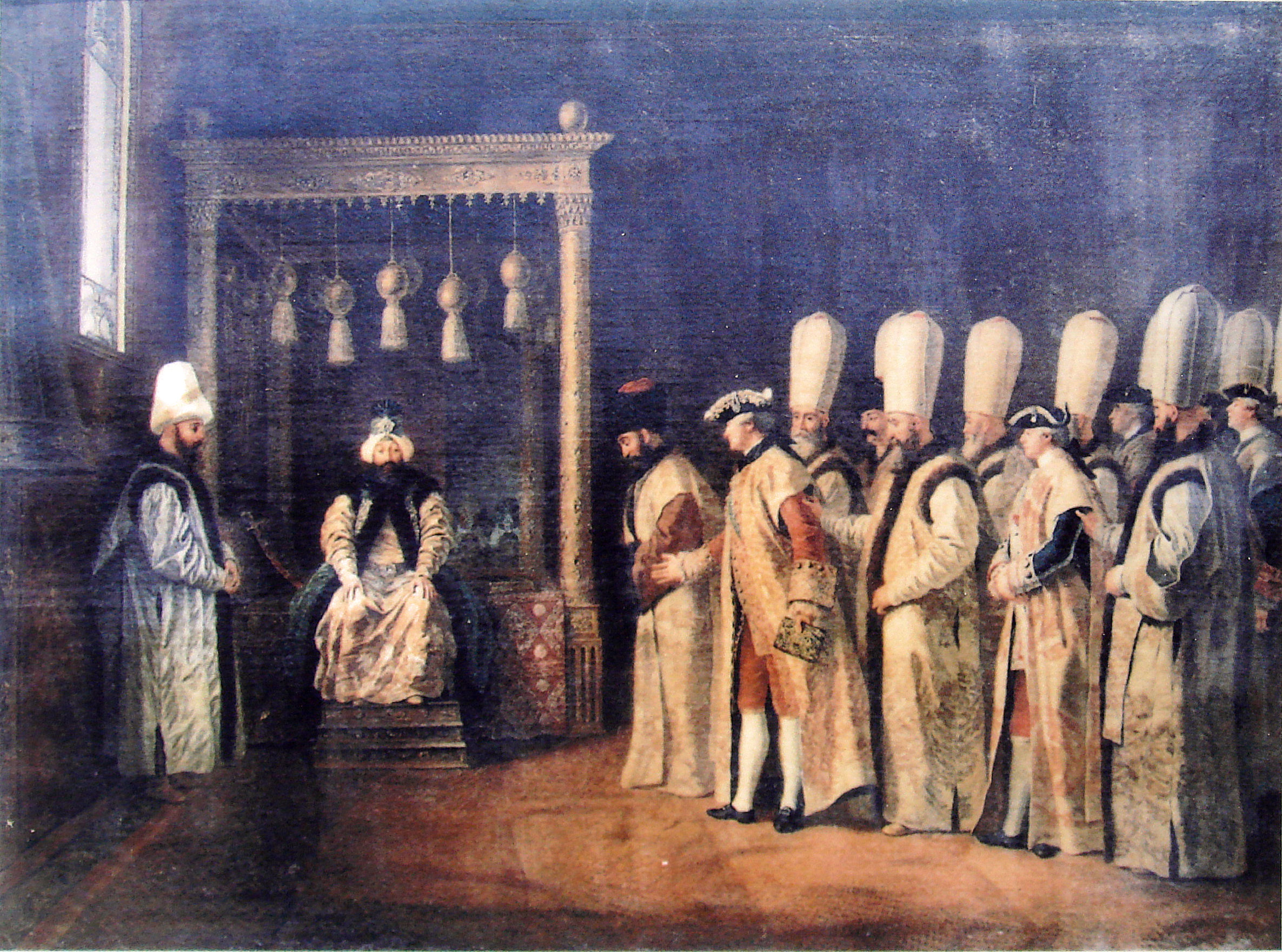
Reception ceremony of the Comte de Saint Priest at the Ottoman Porte Antoine de Favray, 1767.

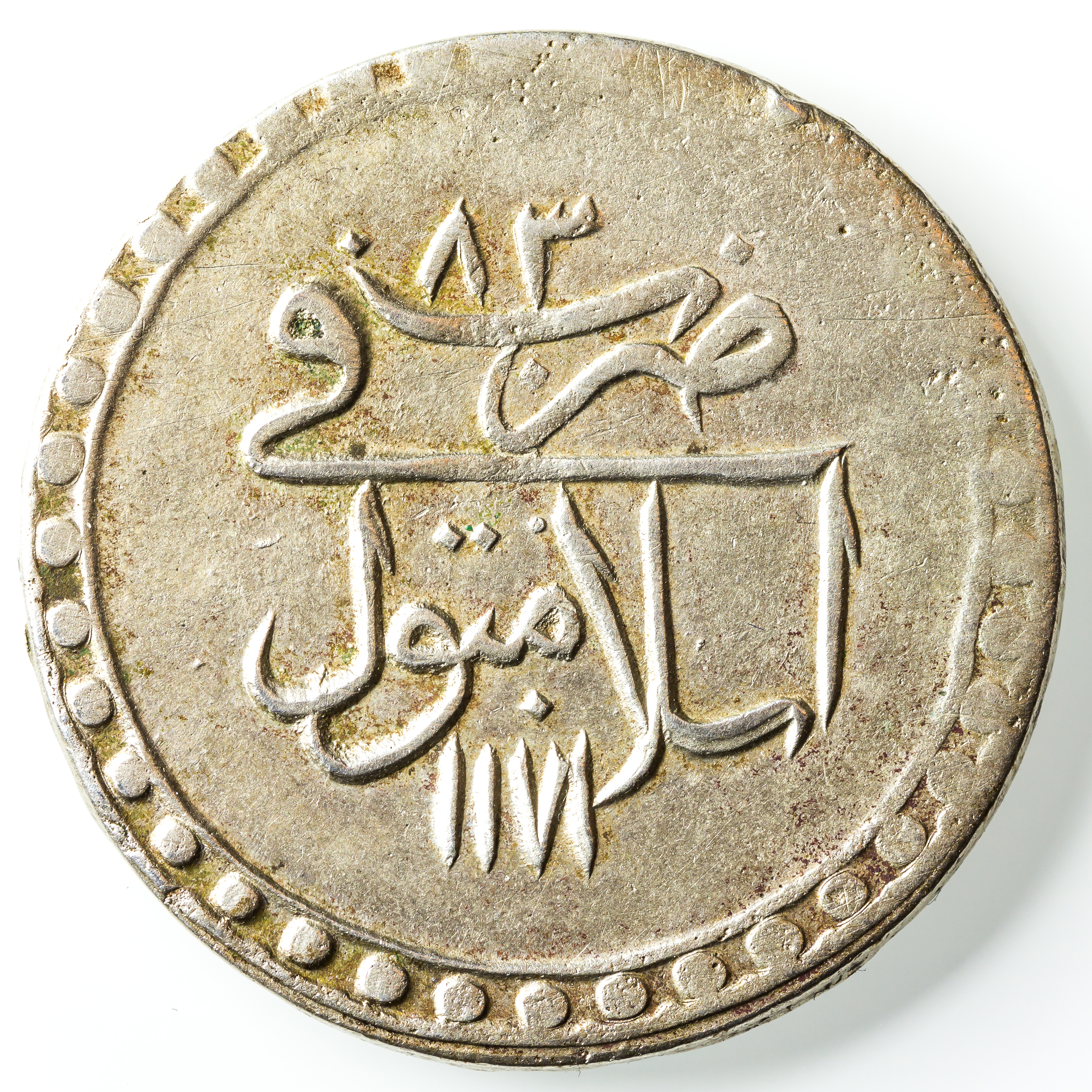
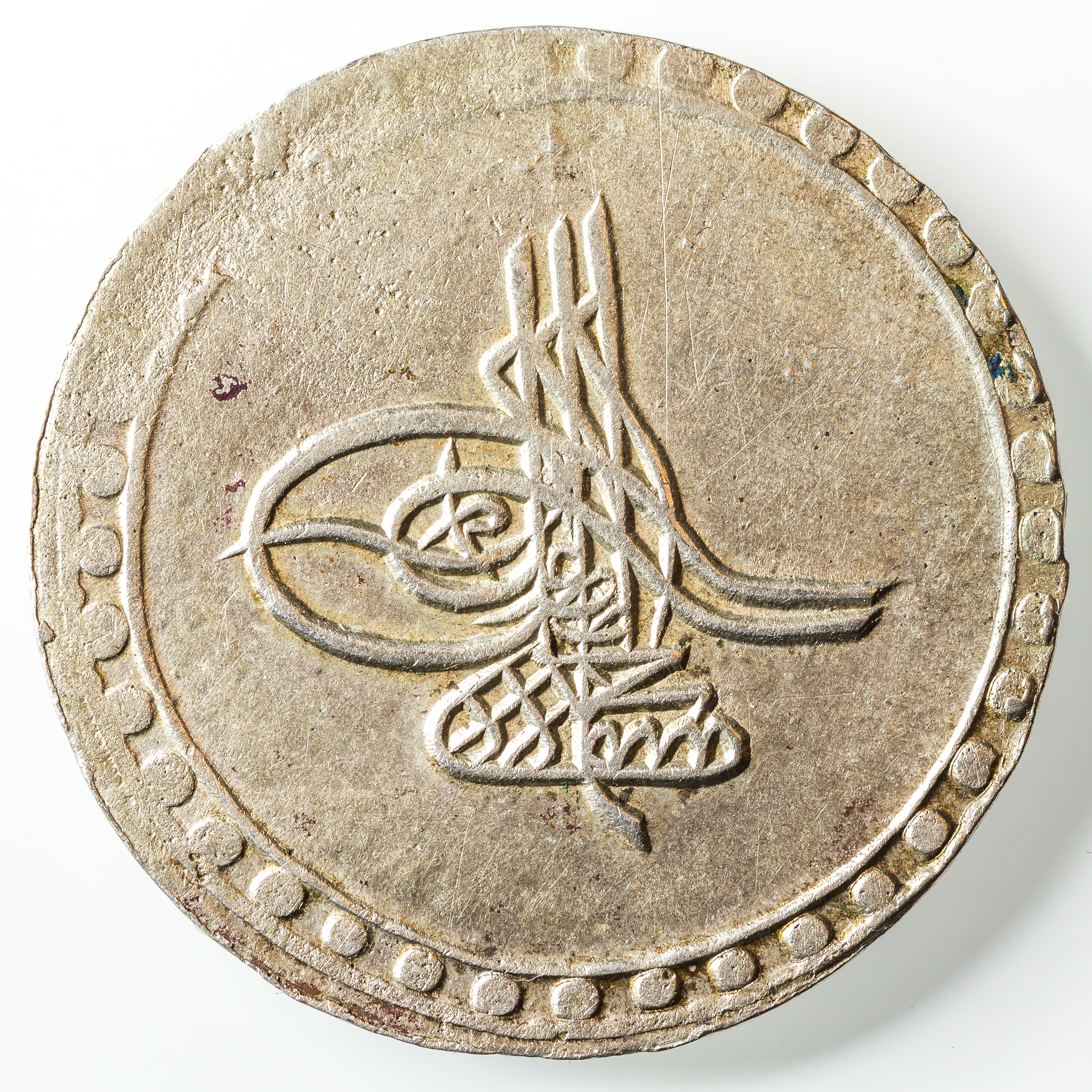
Coin of Mustafa III

Mustafa III (/ˈmʊstəfə/; Ottoman Turkish: مصطفى ثالث Muṣṭafā-yi sālis; 28 January 1717 – 21 January 1774) was the sultan of the Ottoman Empire from 1757 to 1774. He was a son of Sultan Ahmed III (1703–30), and his consort Mihrişah Kadın. He was succeeded by his brother Abdul Hamid I (1774–89). After years of confinement following his father's deposition, he became sultan in 1757. He promoted justice, economic reform, and modernized infrastructure. Admiring Frederick the Great, he aligned diplomatically with Prussia. However, his push for war with Russia in 1768 led to disaster, exposing Ottoman military weakness despite reform efforts. The war ended with major territorial losses.

== Early life ==
Mustafa was born at the Edirne Palace on 28 January 1717. His father was Sultan Ahmed III, and his mother was Mihrişah Kadın. He had a full brother named Şehzade Süleyman. In 1720, a large fifteen day circumcision ceremony took place for Mustafa, and his brothers, princes Süleyman, Mehmed, and Bayezid. In 1730, after the Patrona Halil revolt led to the deposition of his father Sultan Ahmed III and the succession of his cousin Sultan Mahmud I, Mustafa, his father, and brothers were imprisoned in the Topkapı Palace. In 1756, after the death of his elder half-brother Mehmed, he became heir to the throne.

== Reign ==
=== Accession ===
Mustafa ascended the throne on 30 October 1757, after the death of his cousin Osman III, the son of Sultan Mustafa II, marking the first time in Ottoman history that the throne passed down from cousin to cousin.

=== Character of Mustafa's rule ===
Soon after his accession to the throne, Mustafa showed a special concern for justice. He took a number of measures to increase prosperity in Istanbul. He regulated coinage, built large grain stores, maintained aqueducts, and established a strict fiscal policy. He traveled frequently and checked whether the laws he had enacted were being followed.

=== Treaty with Prussia ===
Mustafa much admired Frederick the Great's generalship, and in 1761 established a peace treaty with Prussia. Frederick wanted an alliance against the Habsburgs, and Mustafa wanted to modernize his state and army. Mustafa preferred recruiting his officers in Berlin, rather than in Paris and London, to re-organize his army. In 1763, the two countries exchanged diplomats for the first time.

=== Russo-Turkish War (1768–1774) ===
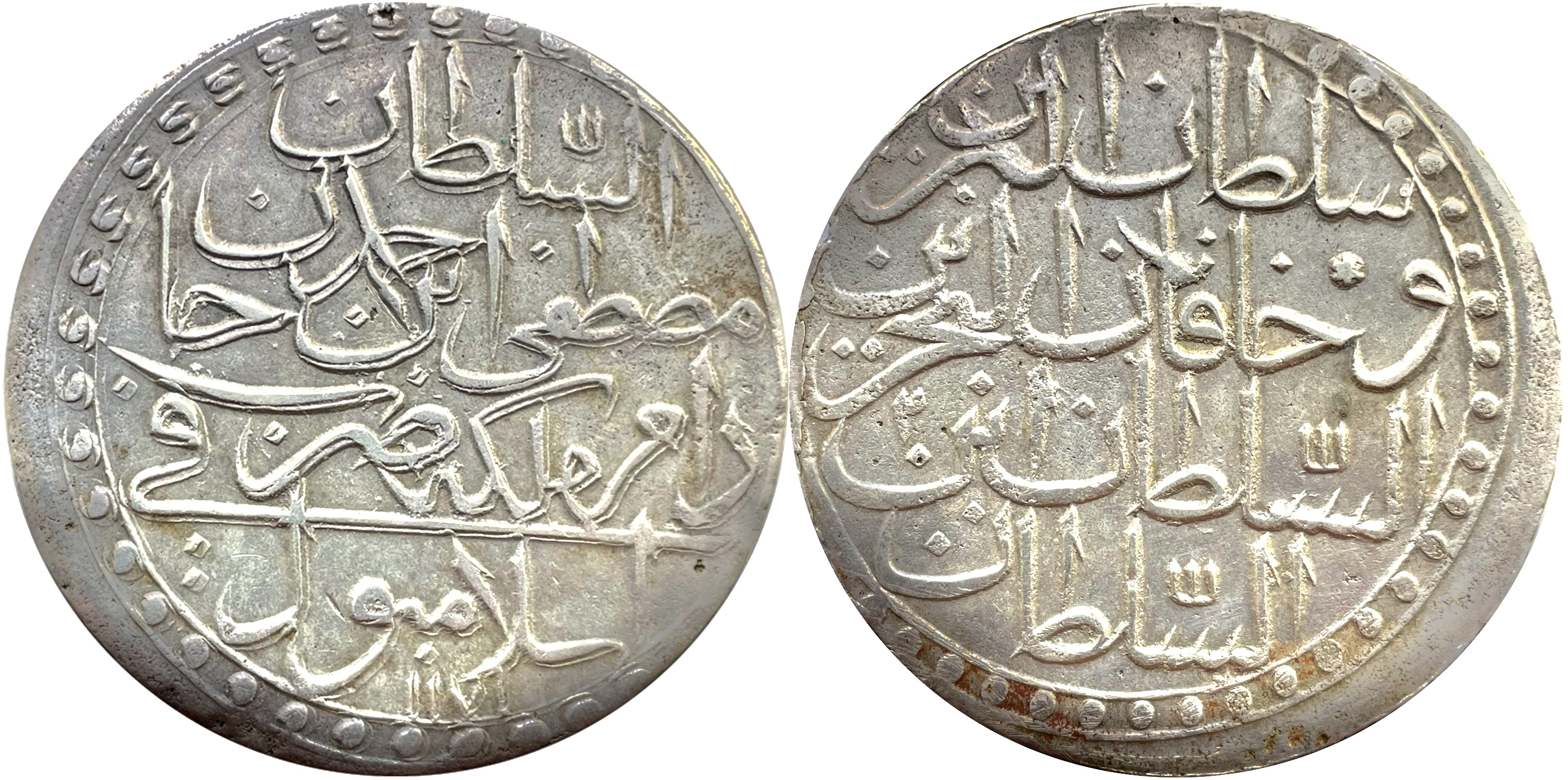
Silver coin: 2 Zolota Mustafa III, 1759

Koca Ragıp Pasha, who remained grand vizier until 1763, pursued a peace policy towards neighboring countries. But the increasing influence of Russia over the Caucasus and its intention to control Poland created tension between the Ottomans and Russia. Ragıp Pasha's successor Muhsinzade Mehmed Pasha also preferred to remain at peace, and Mustafa's insistence on war ("I will find some means of humbling those infidels") with Russia led to his resignation in 1768. The Sultan expected to gain an easy victory over the Russians, but in fact the Ottomans were unprepared for a long war. During the war, military reforms were undertaken, with the assistance of French officer François Baron de Tott. They included the modernization of artillery corps and the foundation of the Naval Engineering School in 1773. The war was disastrous for the Ottoman Empire. The Russian armies occupied Crimea, Romania and parts of Bulgaria.

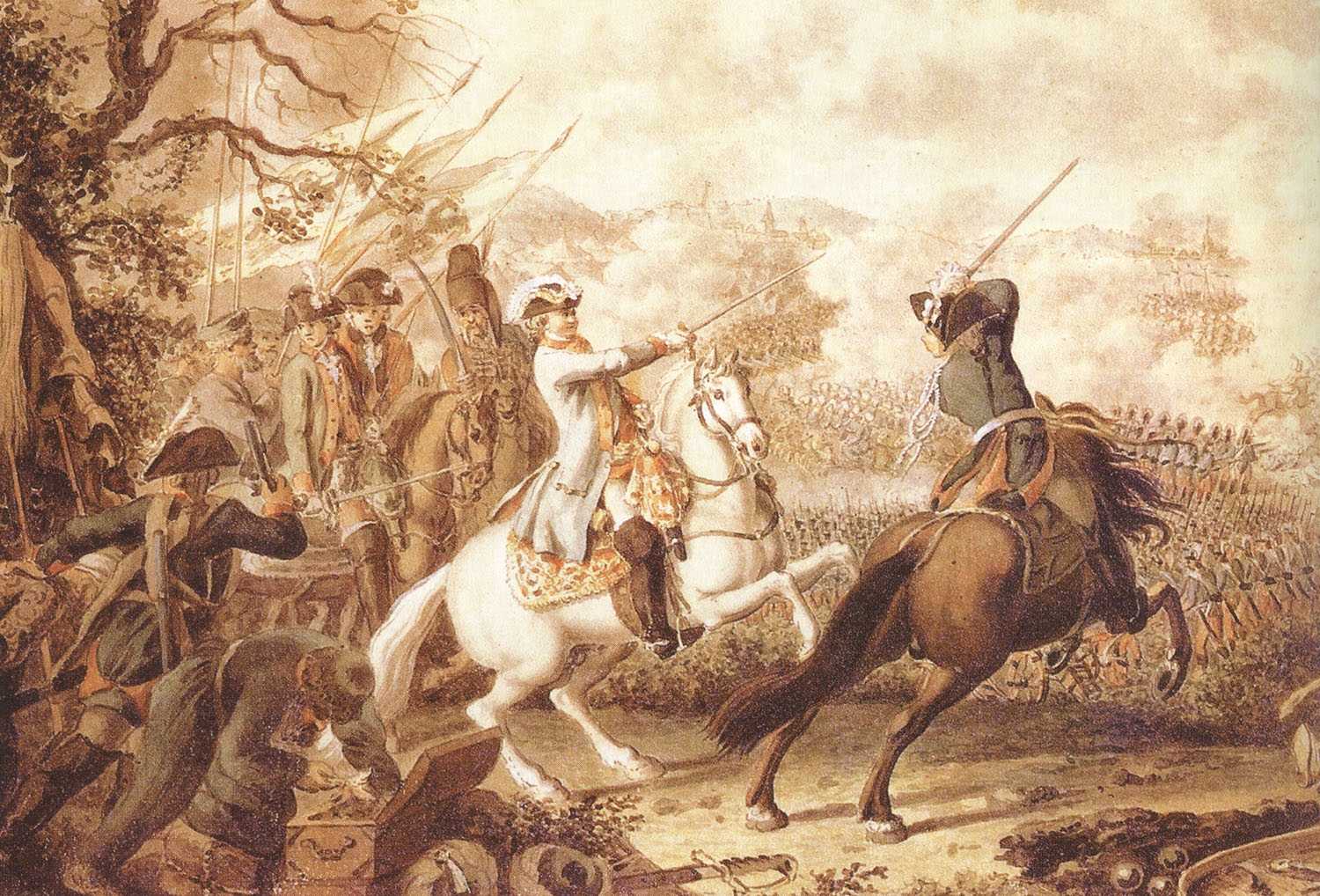
Russian forces charge against the Ottomans in the Battle of Kagul, southern Bessarabia, 1770.

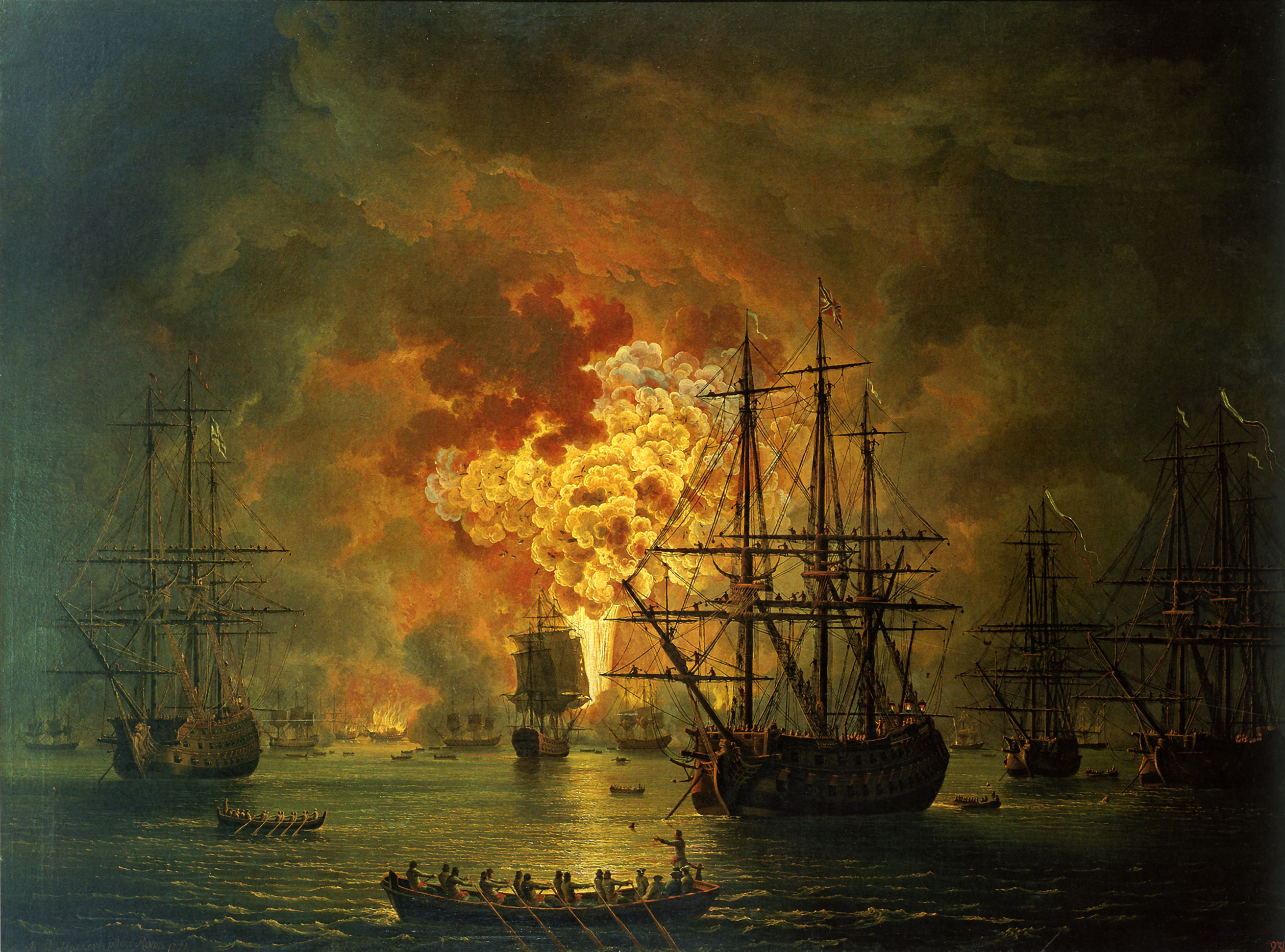
The destruction of the Ottoman fleet in the Battle of Chesma, 1770.

=== Architecture ===
Many monumental buildings including the Fatih Mosque, which was built by Mehmed the Conqueror, were rebuilt from the ground during his reign. In addition, he had built Laleli Mosque complex, and the shore along the Yenikapı filled to set up a new neighborhood. Apart from these, he undertook other construction projects after the earthquakes of 1766, and 1767.

== Personal life ==
=== Poetry of Mustafa III ===
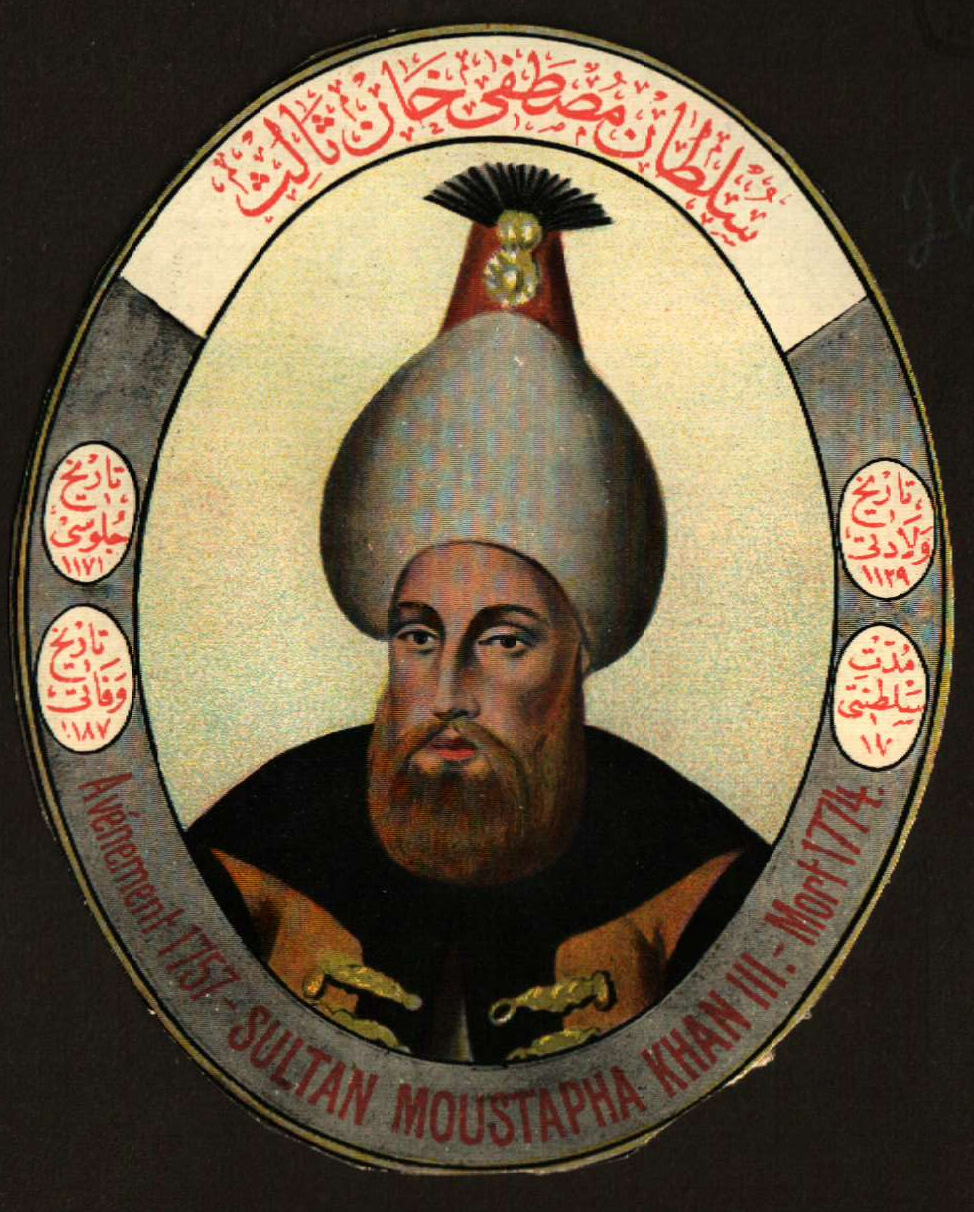
Mustafa III

He was a poet, writing poetry under the pseudonym Cihangir.

(Ottoman Turkish)

"Yıkılupdur bu cihan sanma ki bizde düzele
Devleti çarh-ı deni verdi kamu müptezele
Şimdi erbab-ı saadette gezen hep hazele
İşimiz kaldı hemen merhamet-i lem yezele."

(Translation)

"This world has ruined, don't even think with us it recovers,
It was the lousy fate that has delivered the power to vulgars,
Now the perfidious ones have populated the Imperial Palace,
It's now the mercy of the everlasting God that runs our business.

=== Family ===
==== Consorts ====
Mustafa III had seven known consorts:

- Aynülhayat Kadın (c. 1746 - 1 August 1764). Probably BaşKadin (first consort), is sometimes considered Mustafa's legal wife. She was the mother of at least one daughter and had a sister, Emine Hanim, in the harem like her. She built the Katırcıham Mescid Mosque on 1760. She was buried in Laleli.
- Mihrişah Kadin (c. 1745 - 16 October 1805). She was of Georgian origins, she was the mother of Selim III, Xibeturlah Sultan and Fatma Sultan. She was BaşKadin or became BaşKadin on the death of Aynülhayat Kadın.
- Fehime Kadın (? - 1761). Mother of Reyhan Sultan, she died in childbirth.
- Rifat Kadın (c. 1744 - December 1803). Free-born woman, Mustafa met her while touring Istanbul undercover. She was then entrusted to the Grand Vizier's wife to educate her before entering the harem. Mother of Şah Sultan. After Mustafa's death, she returned to her family. She was buried in the Haydarpaşa cemetery.
- Ayşe Adilşah Kadin (c. 1748 - 19 December 1803). Of Circassian origin, she was the mother of two daughters Beyhan and Hatice . She was buried in the garden of the mausoleum of Mustafa III.
- Binnaz Kadın (c. 1743 - 1823), also known as Beynaz Kadın. Childless, after Mustafa's death she became a consort of his successor, Abdulhamid I. She had no children even with Abdulhamid and, after his death, she was freed and married to Çayırzade İbrahim Ağa. She was buried in the Hamidiye mausoleum.
- Gülman Hanim. BaşIkbal. Also called Gülnar Hanim.

==== Sons ====
Mustafa III had at least two sons:

- Selim III (24 December 1761 - 28 July 1808) - with Mihrişah Kadin. 28th Sultan of the Ottoman Empire.
- Şehzade Mehmed (10 January 1767 - 12 October 1772). His tutor was Küçük Hüseyn Ağa. He was buried in the Mustafa III mausoleum.

==== Daughters ====
Mustafa III had at least nine daughters:

- Hibetullah Sultan (17 March 1759 - 7 June 1762) - with Mihrişah Kadin. Also called Heybetullah Sultan or Heyyibetullah Sultan. Hers was the first imperial birth in 29 years, and was therefore celebrated for ten days and ten nights in an extremely luxurious way. Her nurse was Emine Hanim, sister of Aynülhayat Kadın, and, being Mustafa's mother, Mihrişah Kadin, died, was his sister, Saliha Sultan, wife of the Grand Vizier, who presided over her Cradle Procession. On 2 June 1759, at three months, she was betrothed to Mahir Hamid Hamza Paşah. In the luxurious ceremony, her father gave her the lands of Gümrükçü, but she died of illness at the age of three before being able to celebrate the marriage. She was buried in the Mustafa III mausoleum.
- Şah Sultan (21 April 1761 - 11 March 1803) - with Rifat Kadın. Of frail health, she was engaged twice, but both her fiancés were executed before the wedding. She eventually managed to marry and had two biological daughters and an adoptive one.
- Reyhan Sultan (1761 -?) - with Fehime Kadın. She died as a child.
- Mihrimah Sultan (5 February 1762 - 16 March 1764) - with Aynülhayat Kadın. Her birth was celebrated for five days. She was buried in the Mustafa III mausoleum.
- Mihrişah Sultan (9 January 1763 - 21 February 1769) - perhaps with Aynülhayat Kadın. Her birth was celebrated for three days. She was buried in the mausoleum of Mustafa III.
- Beyhan Sultan (13 January 1766 - 7 November 1824) - with Adilşah Kadin. She married once and had a daughter.
- Hatice Sultan (15 June 1766 – 1767) - perhaps with Aynülhayat Kadın.
- Hatice Sultan (14 June 1768 - 17 July 1822) - with Adilşah Kadin. She married once and had a son.
- Fatma Sultan (9 January 1770 - 26 May 1772) - with Mihrişah Kadin. She was buried in the mausoleum of Mustafa III.

== Death ==
Mustafa died of a heart attack on Friday, 21 January 1774, at the Topkapı Palace, and was buried in his own mausoleum located at Laleli Mosque, Istanbul. He was succeeded by his brother Abdul Hamid I. His death left the empire struggling with economic and administrative problems.

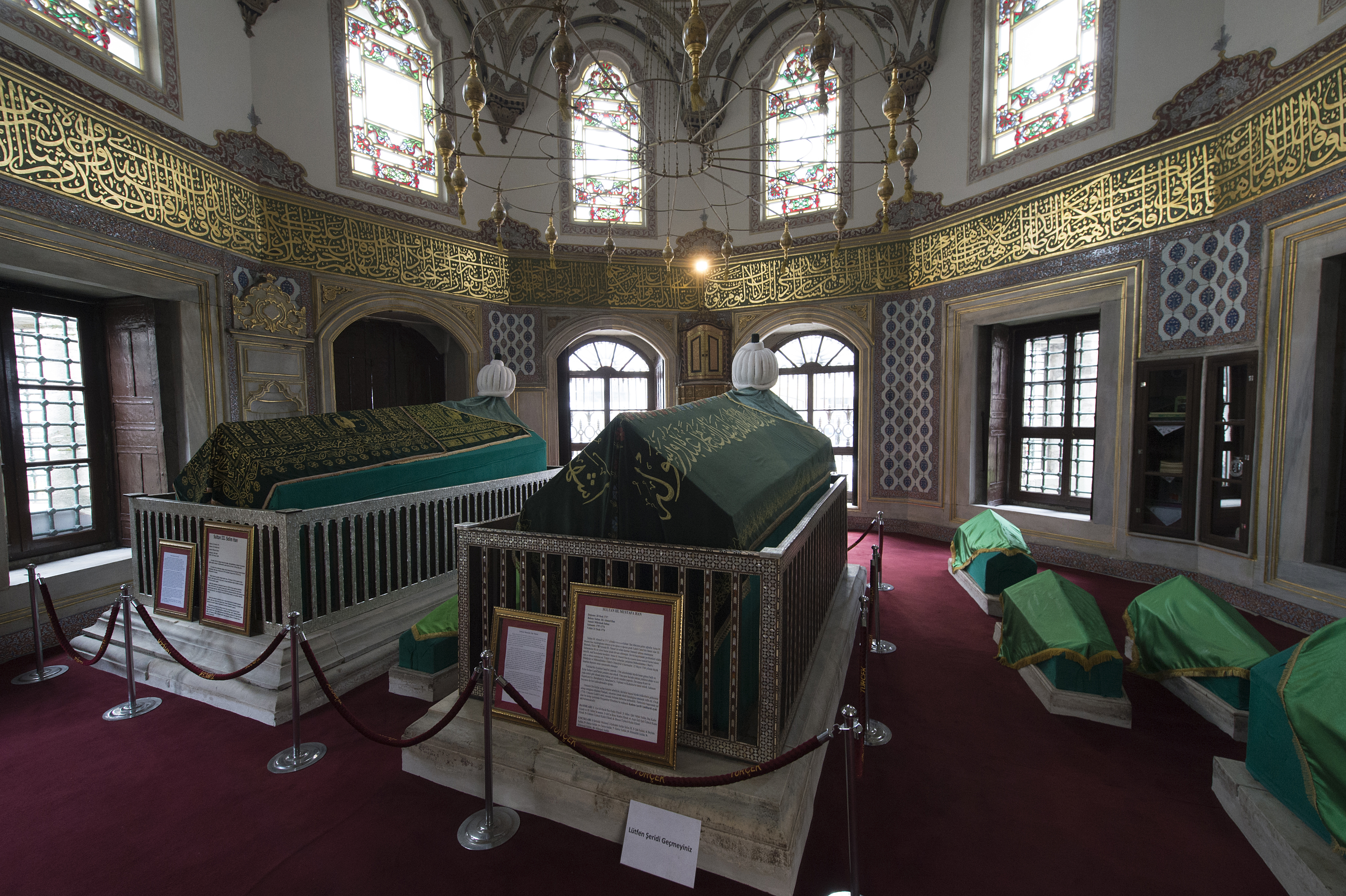
The Laleli Mosque tomb of Sultan Mustafa III and his son Selim III

== Bibliography ==
- Ágoston, Gábor; Masters, Bruce Alan (2009). Encyclopedia of the Ottoman Empire. Infobase Publishing. ISBN 978-1-438-11025-7.
- Sakaoğlu, Necdet (2008). Bu mülkün kadın sultanları: Vâlide sultanlar, hâtunlar, hasekiler, kadınefendiler, sultanefendiler. Oğlak Yayıncılık. ISBN 978-9-753-29623-6.
- Sakaoğlu, Necdet (2015). Bu Mülkün Sultanları. Alfa Yayıncılık. ISBN 978-6-051-71080-8.
- Uluçay, Mustafa Çağatay (2011). Padişahların kadınları ve kızları. Ankara: Ötüken.

Mustafa III House of Osman Born: 28 January 1717 Died: 21 January 1774[aged 56]
Regnal titles
Preceded by Osman III	Sultan of the Ottoman Empire; 30 Oct 1757 – 21 Jan 1774	Succeeded by Abdul Hamid I
Sunni Islam titles
Preceded by Osman III	Caliph of the Ottoman Caliphate; 30 Oct 1757 – 21 Jan 1774	Succeeded by Abdul Hamid I
