= Ottoman military reforms =

Reforms in the military of the Ottoman Empire

Ottoman military reforms began in the late 18th century.

== Formations ==
=== Kapikulu ===
==== Infantry ====
===== Janissary Corps =====
The Janissary Corps had long been the mainstay of the Ottoman infantry and remained so until its disbandment in 1826. However, estimates of the strength of the Corps vary greatly: by 1790, some 12,000 (2,000 combat) were said to reside in Istanbul alone, yet when summoned for campaign in 1810, only 13,000 assembled. Various other estimates place the total strength between 150,000 and 400,000, of which only 50,000 actually served as soldiers (with the remainder collecting pay but refusing to fight). Despite their backwardness in terms of combat, the Corps possessed immense espirit-de-corps, showing great initiative and often fighting to the death. While engaged in combat, the Janissaries would at times mock Western soldiers for their tendency to fight in close order formations. Their older matchlock muskets, despite being slower to fire, were preferred over newer flintlocks, on account of their greater range and accuracy.

===== Bostanji =====
These were the palace guards of the empire and numbered no more than a few thousand throughout the period and were an elite reserve around Edirne and Istanbul.

===== Other formations =====
The Bosnians were organised into the panduks and the Anatolian Turks into the Sekban. The Tufenkis who were mounted infantry were largely Kurdish in origin.

==== Cavalry ====
The Sipahis, traditionally paid by Timars, had degenerated considerably by the 18th century, shrinking from an earlier peak of 30,000 to as few as 2,000 to 3,000. By the end of Selim III's reign, however, they experienced a renewal, expanding to some 10,000 salaried Sipahis (not including provincial cavalry or irregular Deli horsemen). This was a considerable cavalry force, with many of the troopers being instructed by the French advisors to the Porte.

==== Artillery ====
The artillery was divided into the topçu ocağı (artillery corps) and the humbaracı ocağı (mortar corps), these 2 groups received the most attention from the reformers with French and Spanish assistance during the 1807 Anglo-Turkish war, where the Ottoman artillery assembled 322 cannons and mortars alongside thousands of troops to defend the coastline of the Sea of Marmara, necessitating a British withdrawal. The Topçu corps alone contained 30,000 men and the suratçı ocağı (rapid-fire gun corps) had 2,000 men. The artillery corps had 10 infantry assigned per gun and they jointly garrisoned the European side of the Boshporus.

=== Provincial forces ===
==== Asia ====
In Antatolia the majority of local musketeers were Kurdish and the governor of Trabzon organised his own army and proclaimed his independence. However the majority of the Ayans remained loyal including those in the Caucauss with the Kabartay princes and their 30,000 soldiers remaining loyal to the Sultan.

In Iraq, mamluks were used for local law and order whilst Arab troops occupied the forts around Baghdad and they proved adept in combat rebelling the Wahhabi raiders.

In Syria local government was more divided with many of the Pashas maintaining sizable personal armies ranging from 1,000 cavalry and 900 cavalry to 300 cavalry and 100 infantry. The troops were of an ethnic mix and some zamburaks were noted to be used in the Syrian armies.

=== Egypt ===
The Mamluks were the pre-eminent force in Egypt with their forces numbering 10,000 men in strength with 3,000 assistants with 8,500 mamluks in training in the 1780s. The Mamluks spent their entire time dedicated to training and fighting and jealously guarded their military privileges banning anyone from riding a horse in Egypt. The mamluks had by this period fully adopted firearms and trained with these and had abandoned horse archery.

There were also musketeers, janissaries, sipahis and other Ottoman units though these had long since degenerated and the Arabs and Mamluks provided the main forces in Egypt.

== Reforms of Selim III ==
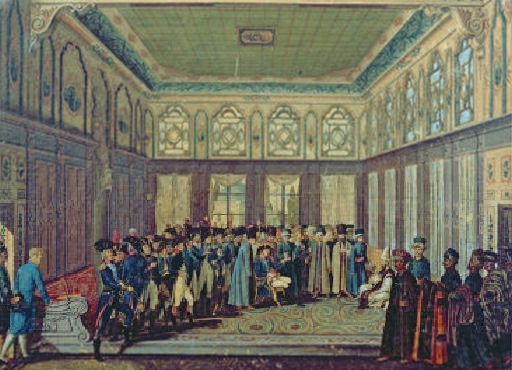
General Aubert-Dubayet with his Military Mission being received by the Grand Vizier in 1796, painting by Antoine-Laurent Castellan.

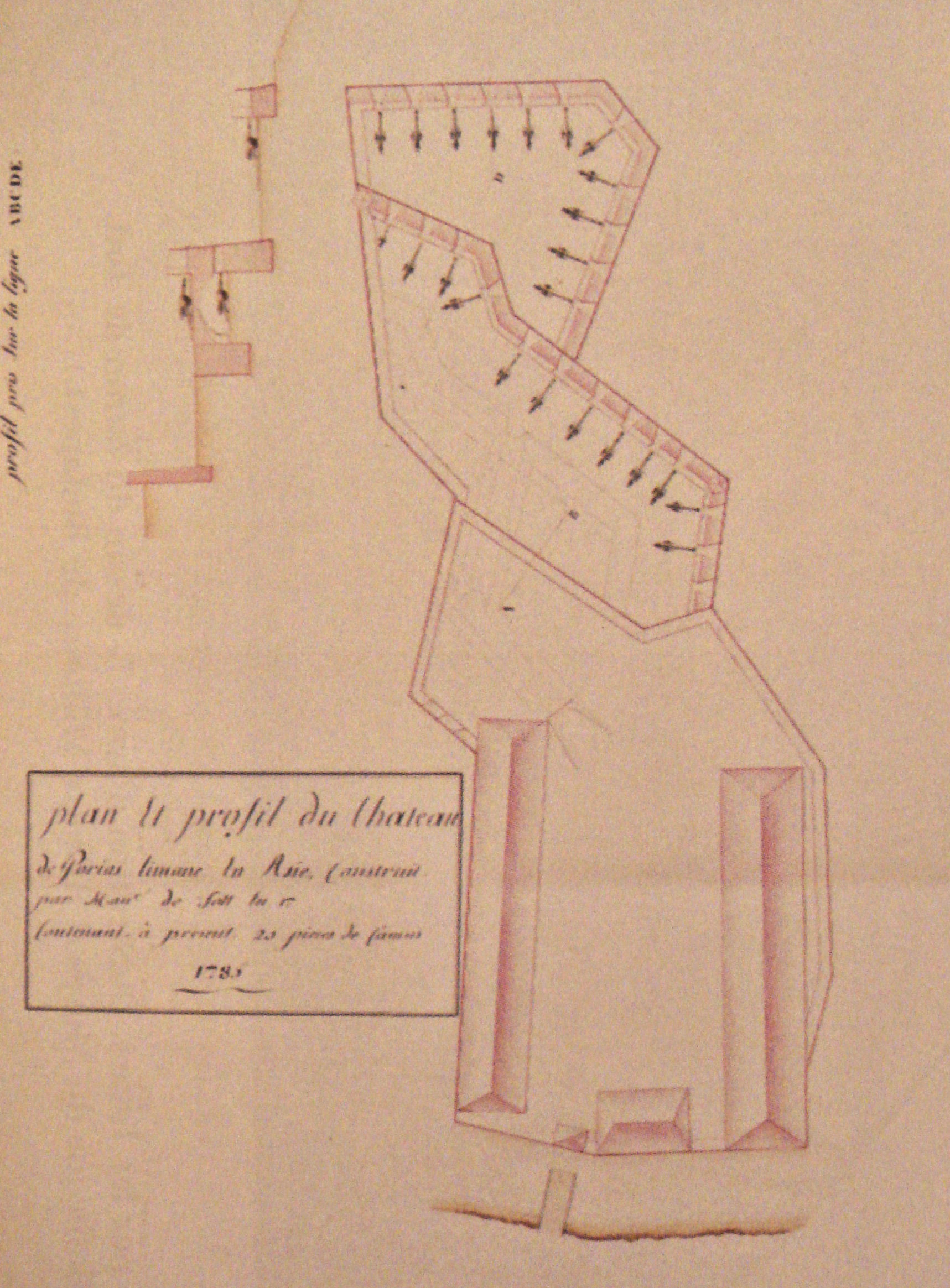
A fortification built by the Baron de Tott for the Ottoman Empire during the Russo-Turkish War (1768–1774).

When Selim III came to the throne in 1789, an ambitious effort of military reform was launched, geared towards securing the Ottoman Empire. The sultan and those who surrounded him were conservative and desired to preserve the status quo. Selim III in 1789 to 1807 set up the "Nizam-i Cedid" [new order] army to replace the inefficient and outmoded imperial army. The old system depended on Janissaries, who had largely lost their military effectiveness. Selim closely followed Western military forms. It would be expensive for a new army, so a new treasury ['Irad-i Cedid'] had to be established. The result was the Porte now had an efficient, European-trained army equipped with modern weapons. However it had fewer than 10,000 soldiers in an era when Western armies were ten to fifty times larger. Furthermore, the Sultan was upsetting the well-established traditional political powers. As a result it was rarely used, apart from its use against Napoléon Bonaparte's expeditionary force at Gaza and Rosetta. The new army was dissolved by reactionary elements with the overthrow of Selim in 1807, but it became the model of the new Ottoman Army created later in the 19th century.

=== Introduction of advisors ===
Western military advisors were imported as advisors but their abilities to enact change were limited. A parade of French officers were brought in, and none of them could do a great deal. One example of an advisor who achieved limited success was the François Baron de Tott, a French officer. He did succeed in having a new foundry built to make artillery. He also directed the construction of a new naval base. However it was almost impossible for him to divert soldiers from the regular army into the new units. The new ships and guns that made it into service were too few to have much of an influence on the Ottoman army and de Tott returned home. He was succeeded by a Scot known as Ingiliz Mustafa.

When they had requested French help, General Bonaparte was to be sent to Constantinople in 1795 to help organize Ottoman artillery. He did not go, for just days before he was to embark for the Near East he proved himself useful to the Directory by putting down a Parisian mob in the whiff of grapeshot and was kept in France.

== Reforms of Mahmud II ==
In 1808 Mustafa IV was replaced by Mahmud II with martial law of Alemdar Mustafa Pasha who restarted the reform efforts. His first task was to ally with the Janissaries in order to break the power of the provincial governors. He then turned on the Janissaries, massacring them in their barracks in Istanbul and the provincial capitals in 1826, which is known as the Auspicious Incident. The Sultan now set himself to replace the Janissaries by other regular troops. The Sultan declared the establishment of the new army, Asakir-i Mansure-i Muhammediye, with a decree on 7 July 1826. The Russo-Turkish War of 1828–1829 did not give him time to organize a new army, and the Sultan was forced to fight with these young and undisciplined recruits. The war was brought to a close by the disastrous Treaty of Adrianople. The Sultan continued his reform efforts by establishing modern institutions to support the army. In 1826, he established the Seraskerlik, equivalent to a modern Ministry of Defense. In 1827, the first military medical school, Imperial School of Medicine, was opened to train doctors and surgeons for the army. In 1834, Harbiye Military School was opened with the support of French military instructors to train officers for the army.

== Reforms of Abdulmejid I ==
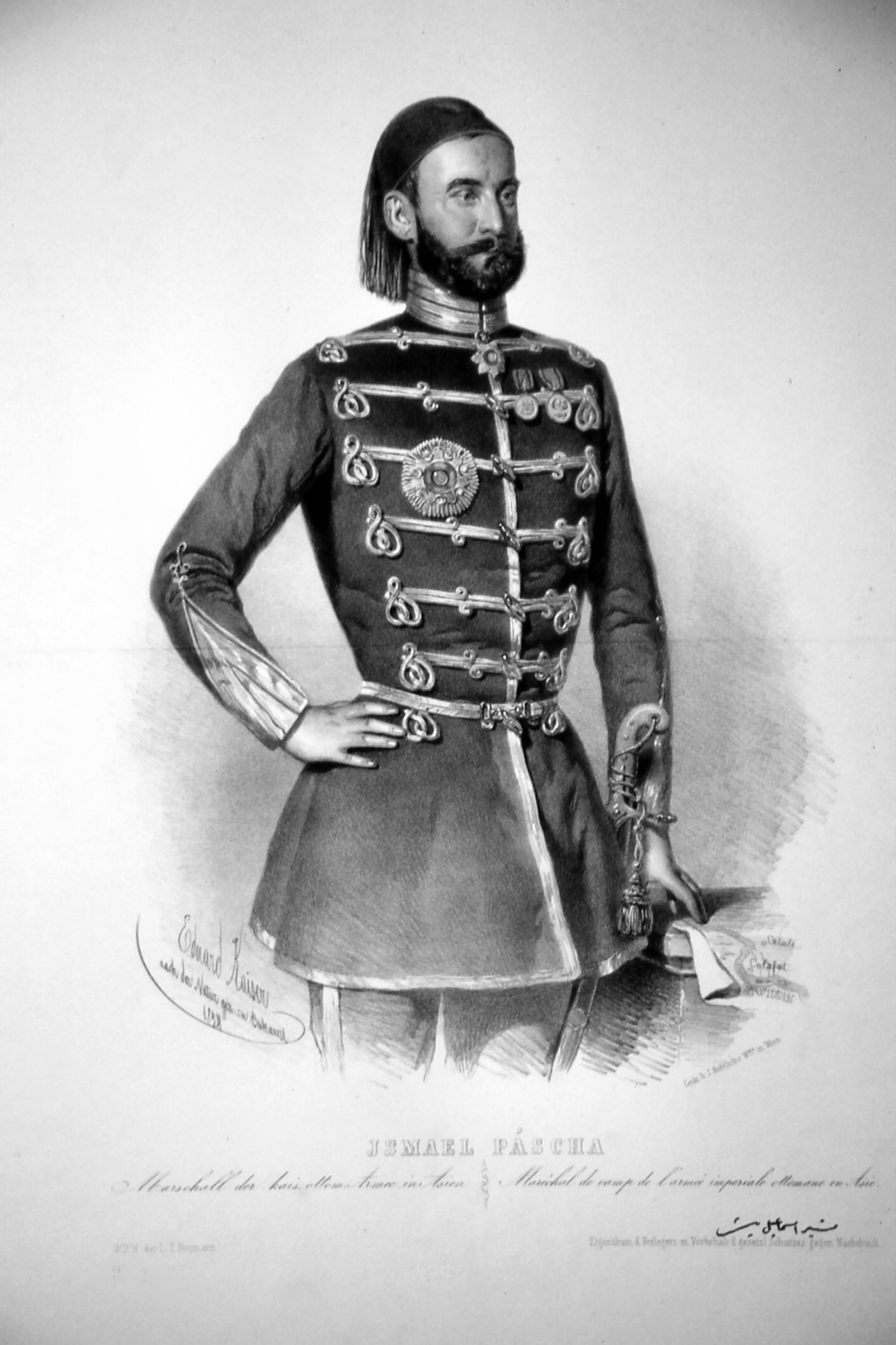
Ismail Pasha in a French-inspired military uniform.

Sultan Abdulmejid I enjoyed several years of peace, which enabled him to form a powerful and well disciplined army that was established at the beginning of the year 1842.

The chain-of-command in the general staff of each army was composed of a commander-in-chief, two lieutenant-generals, three brigadiers of infantry, one of whom commands the reserve, two brigadiers of cavalry, and one brigadier of artillery. In each corps there were three regiments of infantry, two of cavalry, and one of artillery, with thirty-three guns. The total strength of these twelve regiments of active forces was 30,000 men, but it was diminished in time of peace by furlough to an effective strength of about 25,000 men in three of the six armies, as well as 15,000 troops in the other three, a consequence of the recruiting system being as yet incomplete in its application all over the Ottoman Empire. The whole establishment of this branch amounts, therefore, to 180,000 men, belonging to the active service, but its effective strength is at present 123,000.

The reserve of four of the six armies consisted of eleven regiments, six of which were infantry, four of cavalry, and one of artillery. The total combined force equalled 12,000 troops, while the other two armies have not met their reserve of soldiers who have served five years. In time of war, however, the reserve would form two corps of 25,000 men in each army; giving a total of 300,000. The two services, therefore, as they stood, formed an effective force of 135,000 men; and when their full strength shall have been filled up it will amount to 480,000.

Besides these six armies there were four detached corps. These corps raise the effective strength of the standing army to 365,000 men.

Deployment at the time consisted of the following:

- the Island of Crete was assigned three regiments of infantry and one of cavalry, in all 11,000 men;
- the Pashalik of Tripoli in Africa was assigned one regiment of infantry and one of cavalry, about 5,000 strong;
- the Pashalik of Tunis was assigned one regiment of infantry and one of cavalry, about 5,000 strong.

Aside from deployed troops, the Ottoman military also had the following units:

  - the central artillery corps,
  - a standing brigade of sappers and miners with engineer officers,
  - the veteran artillery brigade,
  - permanent artillery garrisons of the fortresses on
    - The Hellespont,
    - The Bosphorus,
    - The Danube, in Serbia, on the Adriatic,
    - The coast of Asia Minor, in the islands of the Archipelago,
    - the southern shores of the Black Sea, constituting a combined force of approximately 9,000 troops.

Besides augmentation of 32,000 men by the submission of Bosnia and Northern Albania to the new system; and a further increase of 40,000 men, which Serbia had arranged to furnish, 18,000 men served in Egypt, which would act to reinforce the reserve of the fifth army.

The marines, sailors, and workmen, enrolled in brigades that amounted to 34,000 total men. The grand total of armed men at the disposal of Ottoman Empire at the time could be calculated at no less than 664,000 men. In addition, the Ottomans could call-up occasional levies, which were more easily and efficiently utilized in the Ottoman Empire than in any other country at the time. After years of peace and stability the modernized army was put to test in the Crimean War.

== Reforms of Abdul Hamid II ==
Abdul Hamid II attached utmost importance to the reorganization of the military. As early as 1880 he sought, and two years later secured, German assistance, which culminated in the appointment of Lt. Col. Kohler and, finally, Colmar Von der Goltz as military advisors.

The curriculum of Harbiye (War College) was specialized further to train staff officers in the European style. The school’s name was changed to Mekteb-i Fununu Harb (School of War Science). It was during his reign that the officers’ training was upgraded and regularized, starting with the mid-level military rt2diye and idadi schools and culminating in the Mekteb-i Harbiye (War College) or, for the most capable, in the Erkan-i Harbiye (Chiefs of Staff). The last, as a concept and an organization, was largely the work of von der Goltz.

However, although the consensus that Abdulhamid favoured the modernization of the Ottoman army and the professionalization of the officer corps was fairly general, it seems that he neglected the military during the last fifteen years of his reign, and he also cut down the military budget. The problem with the army (numbering Ca. 700,000 at the end of the century) The annual army expenditures were some 7,756,000 liras out of a total national budget of 18,927,000 liras for 1897; when the Debt Administration claimed 6,483.000 liras, little was left for investment in economic development.

== 20th century ==
Uyar and Erickson describe the background, details, and results to the January 8, 1911 decree, which created the army corps as an intermediate echelon to eliminate the unmanageable, un-centralized chain of command between massive army field headquarters and individual divisions.

Among the corps created by this reorganisation were the II Corps (Ottoman Empire); the III Corps (Ottoman Empire); and the V Corps (Ottoman Empire).

== Notes ==
- Uyar, Mesut, and Edward J. Erickson. 2009. A Military History of the Ottomans: From Osman to Atatürk. Santa Barbara, CA: Praeger Security International. Available at ResearchGate.
- Turkey in the First World War. n.d. "Army Organization." Digital Research Archive. turkeyswar.com.Australian Army Research Centre. 2021.
- Australian Army Research Centre (2021). "The Ottoman Army in the First World War". Land Power Forum.
- Beşikçi, Mehmet (2017-06-22). "Pre-war Military Planning (Ottoman Empire)". 1914-1918-online. International Encyclopedia of the First World War. Freie Universität Berlin. Edited by Ute Daniel, Peter Gatrell, Oliver Janz, Heather Jones, Jennifer Keene, Alan Kramer, and Bill Nasson. Berlin: Freie Universität Berlin. 1914-1918-online.net.

== See also ==
- Military of the Ottoman Empire
- Auspicious Incident
