= Mehmet Esad Efendi =

Ottoman historian

Mehmet Esad Efendi (c. 1789–1848) was an Ottoman historian. He was court historian to Sultan Mahmud II, who commissioned him to write up the events of the dissolution of the Janissary corps. His book Uss i-zafer ("The Foundation of the Victorious"), is the chief source of information on this incident.
