= Auspicious Incident =

1826 disbandment of the Ottoman janissary corps

- Part of decline and modernization of the Ottoman Empire
Date	15 June 1826
Location	Ottoman Empire
Result	Janissary corps disbanded and replaced with the Asakir-i Mansure-i Muhammediye

Belligerents
Ottoman Empire	Janissary corps

Commanders and leaders
(Ottoman Empire) Mahmud II (Ottoman Empire) Hüsrev Mehmed Pasha	Celâleddin Agha

Strength
(Ottoman Empire) 15,000 to 20,000	70,000–135,000

Casualties and losses
	20,000 janissaries were killed, executed, exiled, or imprisoned.

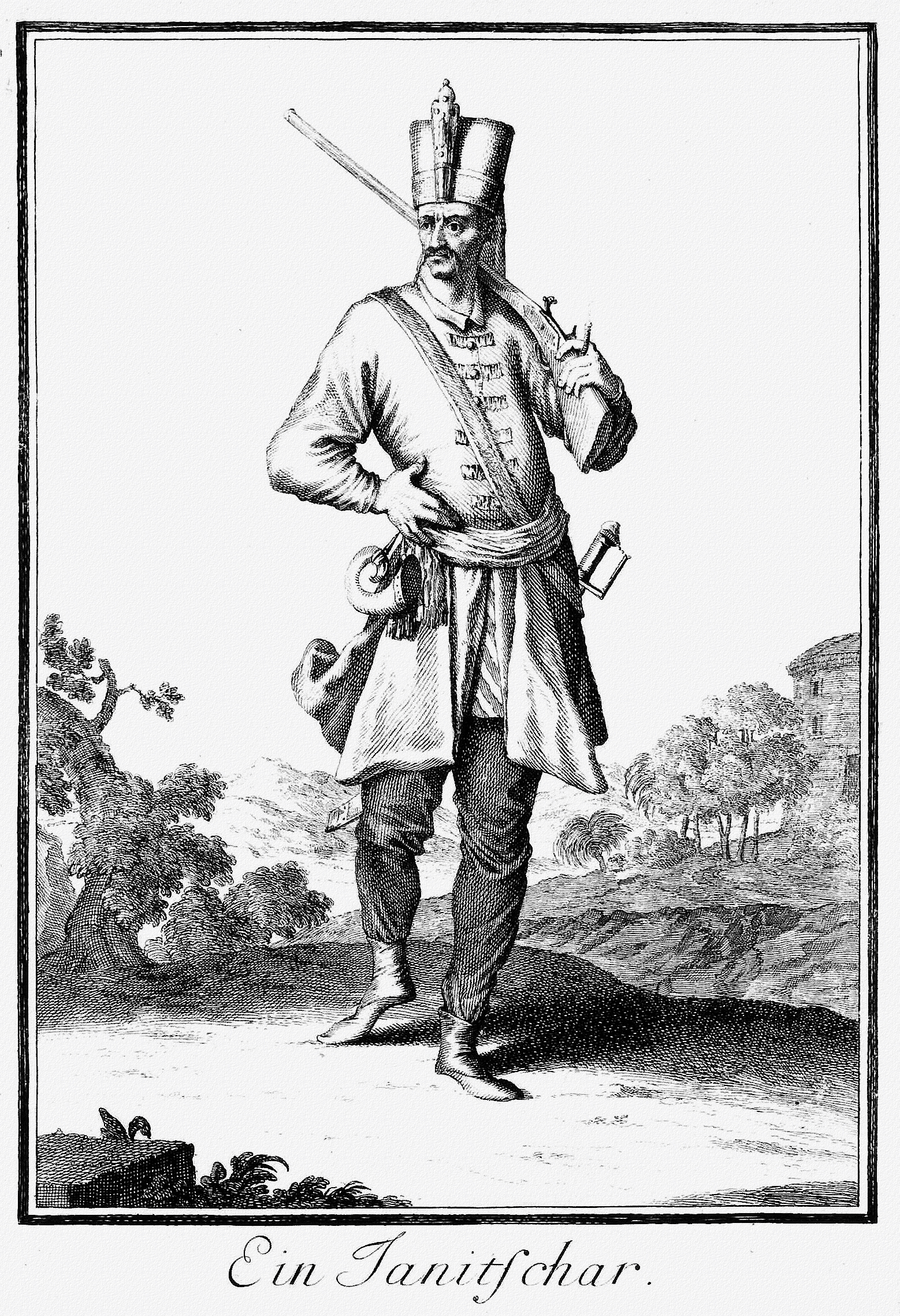
A janissary musketeer. The entire janissary corps was disbanded during the Auspicious Incident.

The Auspicious Incident or Auspicious Event (Ottoman Turkish: وقعۀ خيريّه, romanized: Vak'a-i Hayriyye, lit. 'The Fortunate Event' in Constantinople; Vaka-i Şerriyye, lit. 'Event of Malignity' in the Balkans) was the forced disbandment of the centuries-old janissary corps by Ottoman Sultan Mahmud II on 15 June 1826. Most of the 135,000 janissaries revolted against Mahmud II, and after the rebellion was suppressed, many of them were executed (6,000 or more), exiled or imprisoned. The disbanded janissary corps was replaced with a more modern military force.

== Background ==
The janissaries were first created by the Ottoman Sultans in the late 14th century and were employed as household troops. Janissaries began as an elite corps made up through the devşirme system of child slavery, by which young Christian boys, notably Serbs, Albanians, Bulgarians, Croats, Greeks, Hungarians, and Romanians were taken from the Balkans, circumcised, converted to Islam, and incorporated into the Ottoman army. During the 15th and 16th centuries they were recognized as one of the best-trained and most effective military units in Europe. They became known for their discipline, morale and professionalism. They were paid regularly and were expected to be ready to enter battle at any time.

However, by the early 17th century, the janissary corps had ceased to function as an elite military force, and had become a privileged hereditary class, and their exemption from paying taxes made them disfavoured by the rest of the population. Additionally, since the early eighteenth century, several prominent Istanbul Jewish families had served as moneylenders (sarrafs) and financiers for the corps, with Isaac Çelebi Bekhor Carmona also being one of the Pekidei Kushta at the time. The number of janissaries grew from 20,000 in 1575 to 135,000 in 1826, about 250 years later. Many were not soldiers but still collected pay from the empire, as dictated by the corps since it held an effective veto over the state and contributed to the steady decline of the Ottoman Empire. Any sultan who tried to diminish its status or power was immediately either killed or deposed.

As opportunities and power continued to rise within the janissary corps, it began to undermine the empire. Over time it became clear that for the empire to restore its position as a major power of Europe, it needed to replace the janissary corps with a modern army.

== Mutiny ==
Historians suggest that Mahmud II purposely incited the revolt and have described it as the sultan's "coup against the Janissaries". The sultan informed them that he was forming a new army, the Sekban-ı Cedit, organized and trained along modern European lines, and that the new army would be Turkish-dominated. The janissaries saw their institution as crucial to the well-being of the Ottoman Empire, especially to Rumelia, and had previously decided they would never allow its dissolution. Thus, as predicted, they mutinied and began to march towards the Topkapı Palace.

Mahmud II then brought out the Holy Banner of the Islamic prophet Muhammad from inside the Sacred Trust, intending all true believers to gather beneath it and thus bolster opposition to the janissaries. Turkish historians claim that the large counter-Janissary force included local residents who had hated the janissaries for years.

In the ensuing fight the janissary barracks were set ablaze by artillery fire, resulting in 4,000 Janissary deaths; more were killed in heavy fighting on the streets of Istanbul (the capital of the Ottoman Empire and the center of the janissary order). The survivors either fled or were imprisoned, their possessions confiscated by the Sultan. By the end of 1826 the captured janissaries, constituting the remainder of the force, were put to death by decapitation in the Thessaloniki fort that soon came to be called the "Blood Tower" (but which has been known since 1912 as the White Tower). Roughly 100 other janissaries fled to the Cistern of Philoxenos, where many drowned as they tried to cross.

== Aftermath ==
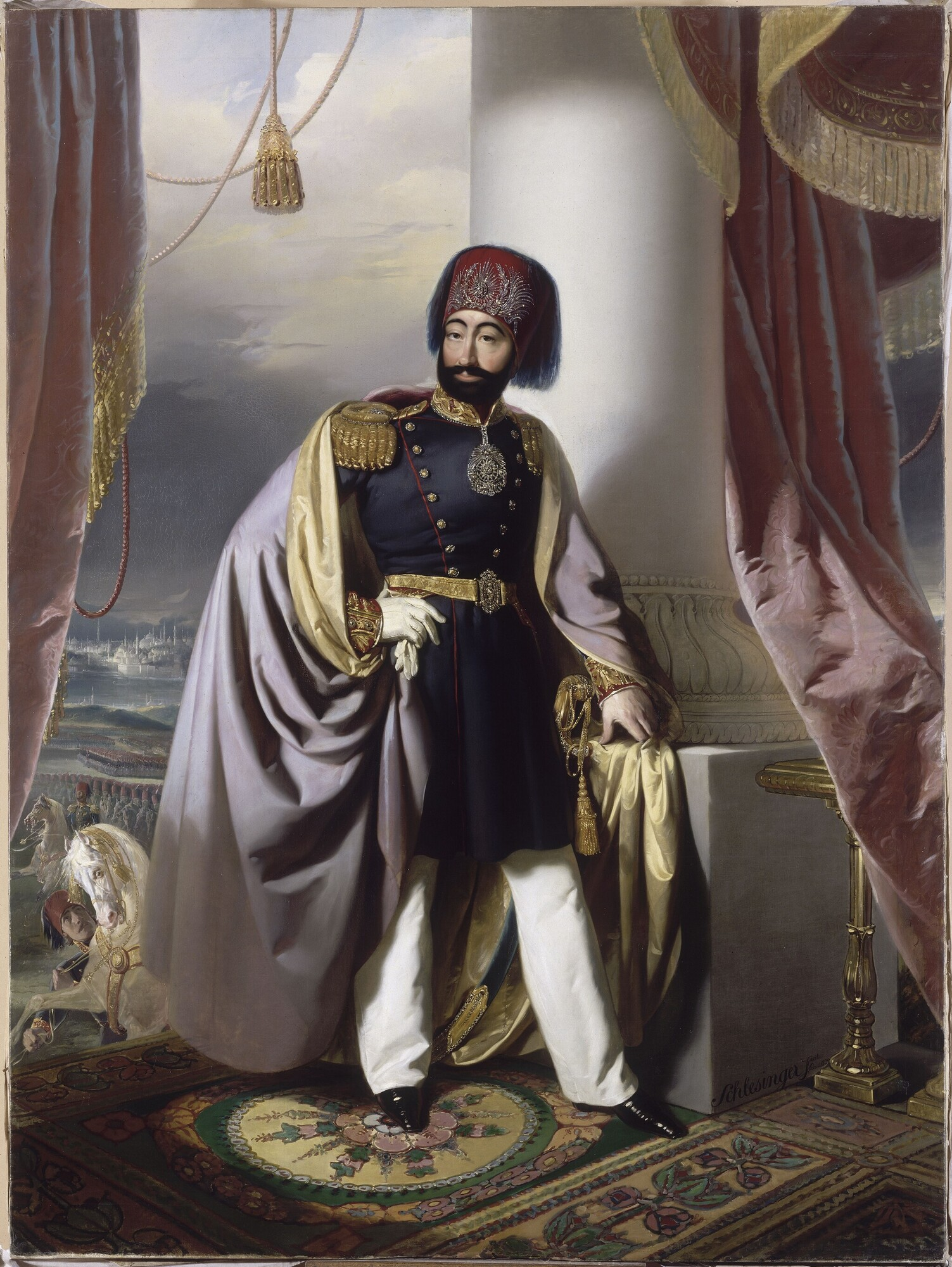
Portrait of Mahmud II by Henri-Guillaume Schlesinger, 1836, presumably commemorating the 10th anniversary of the Auspicious Incident

The janissary leaders were promptly put to death. Carmona and two other leading figures of the Istanbul Jewish community serving as moneylenders and financiers for the corps were also executed. The younger and older janissaries were either exiled or imprisoned, but those who were competent and showed promise were allowed to take jobs in the Ottoman foreign ministry or join the new Ottoman Army as officers. Thousands of janissaries had been killed, and thus the elite order came to its end. The Sufi Order of the Bektaşi Brotherhood, a core janissary institution, was outlawed, and its followers executed or exiled. A new modern corps, Asakir-i Mansure-i Muhammediye ("The Victorious Soldiers of Muhammad"), was established by Mahmud II to guard the Sultan and replace the janissaries. Many former janissaries, especially those living in the provinces outside the capital, subsequently became involved in anti-Ottoman political movements demanding greater autonomy. In particular, they incited Christians in the Balkans, inflaming existing hostility to their Muslim neighbors and strengthening armed resistance to the new Turkish armies sent from Constantinople. Some janissaries, however, survived by merely keeping a low profile and taking ordinary jobs.

Immediately after the janissaries had been disbanded, Mahmud II ordered the court chronicler, Mehmet Esad Efendi, to record the official version of events. This account, Üss-i Zafer ("Foundation of Victory"), was printed in Istanbul in 1828 and served as the main source for every other Ottoman account of this period. The incident had a negative impact on the Muslim communities in the Balkans, who lost their privileges, as rebellions broke out across Rumelia, especially in Bosnia and Albania.

Taking advantage of the temporary weakness in the military position of the Ottoman Empire following the Auspicious Incident, the Russian Empire forced the Ottomans to accept the Akkerman Convention on 7 October 1826.

Vis-à-vis the impact on the Jewish philanthropic network fundraising for the Land of Israel in Western Europe at the time, in 1827, leading force Hirsch Lehren behind Amsterdam-based Pekidim ve-Amarkalim wrote to Istanbul officials expressing his sympathy over the recent demise of Carmona, though modern Jewish history scholar Matthias B. Lehmann notes "it is also clear that the increasingly assertive role played by [both] was facilitated in part by the declining fortunes of the Jewish leadership in the Ottoman capital."

== See also ==
- Sanjak of Smederevo
- First Serbian Uprising
- Mustafa IV
- Halet Efendi
- Hursid Pasha
- Reşid Mehmed Pasha
- Ottoman military reforms
- Mustafa Reshiti
- Husein Gradaščević
