= Military of the Ottoman Empire =

- Osmanlı İmparatorluğu'nun silahlı kuvvetleri (Turkish)
- Coat of arms of the Ottoman Empire
- Founded: 1299
- Current form: 1861
- Disbanded: 1922
- Service branches: Ottoman Army; Ottoman Navy; Ottoman Air Force
- Headquarters: Constantinople, Ottoman Empire

Leadership
- Commander-in-Chief: Ottoman Sultan

Personnel
- Conscription: Yes

Related articles
- Ranks: Military ranks of the Ottoman Empire

The Military of the Ottoman Empire (Turkish: Osmanlı İmparatorluğu'nun silahlı kuvvetleri) was the armed forces of the Ottoman Empire. It was founded in 1299 and dissolved in 1922.

== Army ==
The Military of the Ottoman Empire can be divided in five main periods. The foundation era covers the years between 1300 (Byzantine expedition) and 1453 (Conquest of Constantinople), the classical period covers the years between 1451 (second enthronement of Sultan Mehmed II) and 1606 (Peace of Zsitvatorok), the reformation period covers the years between 1606 and 1826 (Vaka-i Hayriye), the modernisation period covers the years between 1826 and 1858 and decline period covers the years between 1861 (enthronement of Sultan Abdülaziz) and 1918 (Armistice of Mudros). The Ottoman army is the forerunner of the Turkish Armed Forces.

=== Foundation period (1300–1453) ===
The earliest form of the Ottoman military was a steppe-nomadic cavalry force. This was centralized by Osman I from Turkoman tribesmen inhabiting western Anatolia in the late 13th century.

These horsemen became an irregular force of raiders used as shock troops, armed with weapons like bows and spears. They were given fiefs called timars in the conquered lands and were later called timariots. In addition, they acquired wealth during campaigns.

Orhan organized a standing army paid by salary rather than looting or fiefs. The infantry were called yayas and the cavalry was known as müsellems. The force was made up of foreign mercenaries for the most part, and only a few Turks were content to accept salaries in place of timars. Foreign mercenaries were not required to convert to Islam as long as they obeyed their Ottoman commanders.

The Ottomans began using guns in the late 14th century. Following that, other troop types began to appear, such as the regular musketeers (Piyade Topçu, literally "foot artillery"); regular cavalry armed with firearms (Süvari Topçu Neferi, literally "mounted artillery soldier"), similar to the later European reiter or carabinier; and bombardiers (Humbaracı), consisting of grenadiers who threw explosives called khımbara and the soldiers who served the artillery with maintenance and powder supplies.

The Ottoman Empire was the first of the three Islamic Gunpowder Empires, followed by Safavid Persia and Mughal India. By the 14th century, the Ottomans had adopted gunpowder artillery. The adoption of the gunpowder weapons by the Ottomans was so rapid that they "preceded both their European and Middle Eastern adversaries in establishing centralized and permanent troops specialized in the manufacturing and handling of firearms." But it was their use of artillery that shocked their adversaries and impelled the other two Islamic Gunpowder Empires to accelerate their weapons program. The Ottomans had artillery at least by the reign of Bayezid I and used them in the sieges of Constantinople in 1399 and 1402. They finally proved their worth as siege engines in the successful siege of Salonica in 1430.

The Ottoman military's regularized use of firearms proceeded ahead of the pace of their European counterparts. The Janissaries had initially been an infantry bodyguard using bows and arrows. By the time of Sultan Mehmed II, they had been drilled with firearms and became "perhaps the first standing infantry force equipped with firearms in the world." The Janissaries are thus considered the first modern standing armies. The combination of artillery and Janissary firepower proved decisive at Varna in 1444 against a force of Crusaders, and later Başkent and Chaldoran against the Aq Qoyunlu and Safavids.

=== Classical Army (1451–1606) ===
Ottoman Classical Army was the military structure and the founding and main army established by Mehmed II, during his reorganization of the state and the military efforts. This is the major reorganization following Orhan I which organized a standing army paid by salary rather than booty or fiefs. This army was the force during the rise of the Ottoman Empire. The organization was twofold, central (Kapu Kulu) and peripheral (Eyalet). The classical Ottoman army was the most disciplined and feared military force of its time, mainly due to its high level of organization, logistical capabilities and elite troops. Following a century-long reform efforts, this Army was forced to disband by Sultan Mahmud II on 15 June 1826 in what is known as the Auspicious Incident. By the reign of Mahmud the Second, the elite janissaries had become corrupt and always stood in the way of modernization efforts meaning they were more of a liability than an asset.

By the siege of Constantinople in 1453, the Ottomans had large enough cannons to batter the walls of the city, to the surprise of the defenders. The Dardanelles Gun was designed and cast in bronze in 1464 by Munir Ali. The Dardanelles Gun was still present for duty more than 340 years later in 1807, when a Royal Navy force appeared and commenced the Dardanelles Operation. Turkish forces loaded the ancient relics with propellant and projectiles, and then fired them at the British ships. The British squadron suffered 28 casualties from this bombardment.

The musket first appeared in the Ottoman Empire by 1465. Damascus steel was later used in the production of firearms such as the musket from the 16th century. At the Battle of Mohács in 1526, the Janissaries equipped with 2000 muskets "formed 8 consecutive rows and they fired their weapons row by row," in a "kneeling or standing position without the need for additional support or rest." The Chinese attempted to adopt the Ottoman kneeling position for firing. In 1598, Chinese writer Zhao Shizhen described Turkish muskets as being superior to European muskets.

The marching band and military band both have their origins in the Ottoman military band, performed by the Janissary since the 16th century.

Classical period (1451–1606)

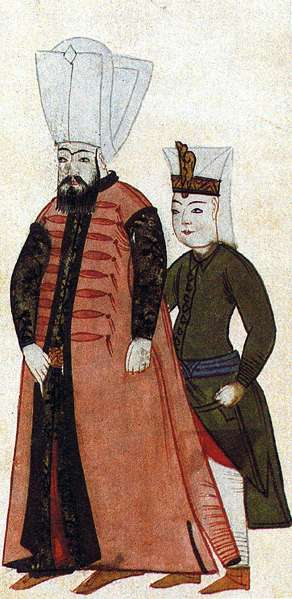
Agha of the Janissaries

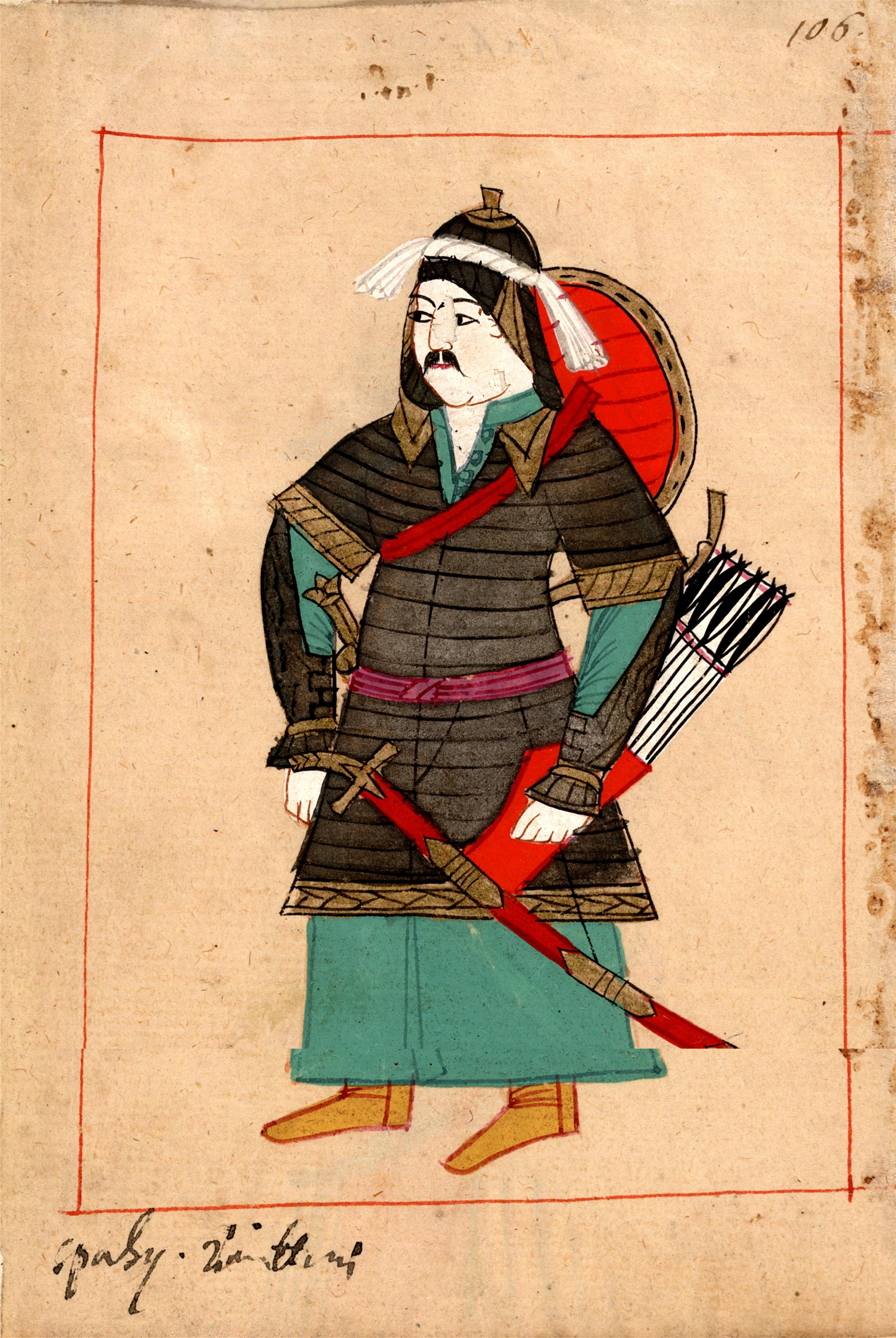
Sipahi horse-archer

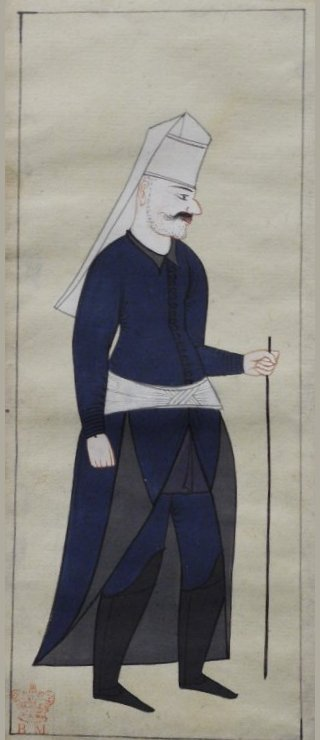
Head cook of a Janissary regiment

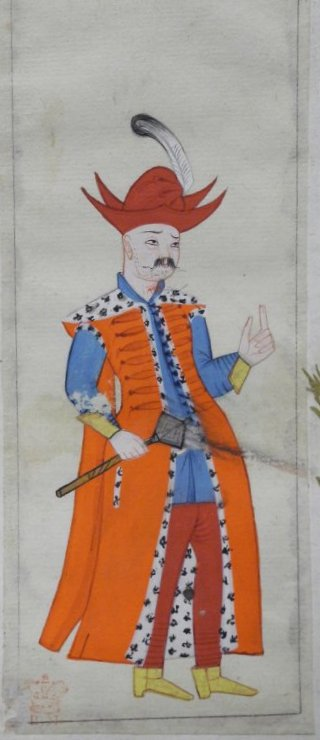

=== Reform on Classical Army (1606–1826) ===
The main theme of this period is reforming the Janissaries. The Janissary Corps was originally made up of enslaved young Christian boys, generally from the western Balkans, who were forced to convert to Islam and were educated in military matters under the Ottoman Empire. During the 15th and 16th Centuries, they became known as the most efficient and effective military unit in Europe. By 1570 born Muslims were accepted into the Janissaries Corps and by the 17th century most would be born Muslims. According to Jason Goodwin in the 17th and 18th centuries, most Janissaries were both Muslim Albanians and Muslim Bosnians.

Aside from the Janissary infantry, there was also the Sipahi Cavalry. They were, however, different from the Janissaries in that they had both military and administrative duties. The Janissaries were tied strictly to being able to perform military duties at any time, however, the Sipahi were treated differently primarily in that they got their income from the land that was given to them by the Sultan under the timariot system. Within these agricultural lands, the Sipahi were in charge of collecting the taxes that would serve as their salary. At the same time, they were responsible for maintaining peace and order there. They were also expected to be able to serve in the military whenever the Sultan deemed their service necessary.

In 1621, the Chinese Wu Pei Chih described Ottoman muskets that used a rack-and-pinion mechanism, which was not known to have been used in any European or Chinese firearms at the time.

The Ottoman military was capable of matching those of its European rivals during the first half of the eighteenth century, and there was no significant technological gap between them. However, following the 1739 Treaty of Belgrade, the Ottomans remained at peace in Europe for nearly thirty years, missing out on the rapid improvements in military technology and organization associated with the Seven Years' War (1756-63), particularly the development of highly trained and disciplined regimental forces, innovations in the tactical deployment of small-caliber cannons, and the widespread use of socket bayonets as a counter to cavalry.

The Ottoman Empire made numerous efforts to recruit French experts for its modernization. The French officer and adventurer Claude-Alexandre de Bonneval (1675–1747) went in the service of Sultan Mahmud I, converted to Islam, and endeavoured to modernize the Ottoman army, creating cannon foundries, powder and musket factories and a military engineering school. Another officer François Baron de Tott was involved in the reform efforts for the Ottoman military. He succeeded in having a new foundry built to make howitzers and was instrumental in the creation of mobile artillery units. He built fortifications on the Bosphorus and started a naval science course that laid the foundation stone for the later Turkish Naval Academy. He could only achieve limited success, however. Unfortunately, it was almost impossible for him to divert soldiers from the regular army into the new units. The new ships and guns that made it into service were too few to have much of an influence on the Ottoman army and de Tott returned home.

When they had requested French help in 1795, young Napoleon Bonaparte was scheduled to be sent to Constantinople to help organize Ottoman artillery. He did not go, for just days before he was to embark for the Near East he proved himself useful to the Directory by putting down a Parisian mob at 13 Vendémiaire and was kept in France.

The supply of Ottoman forces operating in Moldavia and Wallachia was a major challenge that required well-organized logistics. An army of 60,000 soldiers and 40,000 horses required a half-million kilograms of food per day. The Ottoman forces fared better than the Russians, but the expenses crippled both national treasuries. Supplies on both sides came using fixed prices, taxes, and confiscation.

Sultan Selim III from 1789 to 1807 set up the "Nizam-i Cedid" [new order] army to replace the inefficient and outmoded imperial army. The old system depended on Janissaries, who had largely lost their military effectiveness. Selim closely followed Western military forms. It would be expensive for a new army, so a new treasury ['Irad-i Cedid'] was established. The result was the Porte now had an efficient, European-trained army equipped with modern weapons. However, it had fewer than 10,000 soldiers in an era when Western armies were ten to fifty times larger. Furthermore, the Sultan was upsetting the well-established traditional political powers. As a result, it was rarely used, apart from its use against Napoleon's expeditionary force at Gaza and Rosetta. The new army was dissolved by reactionary elements with the overthrow of Selim in 1807, but it became the model of the new Ottoman Army created later in the 19th century.

Units of Reform efforts (1606–1826)
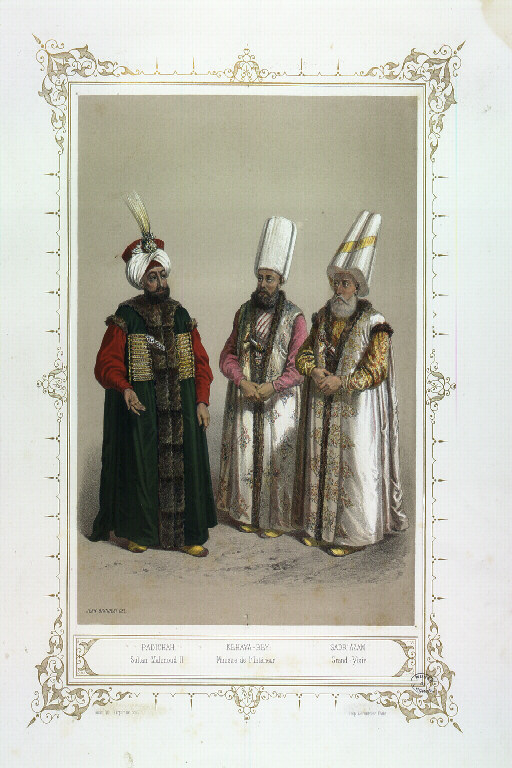
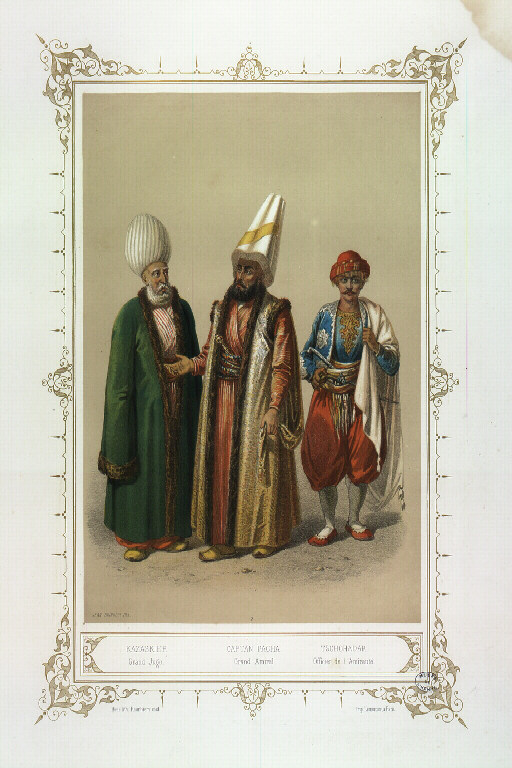
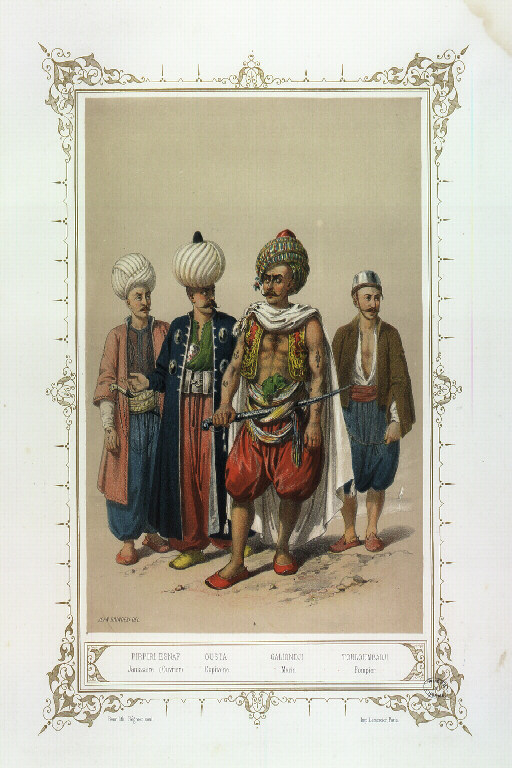
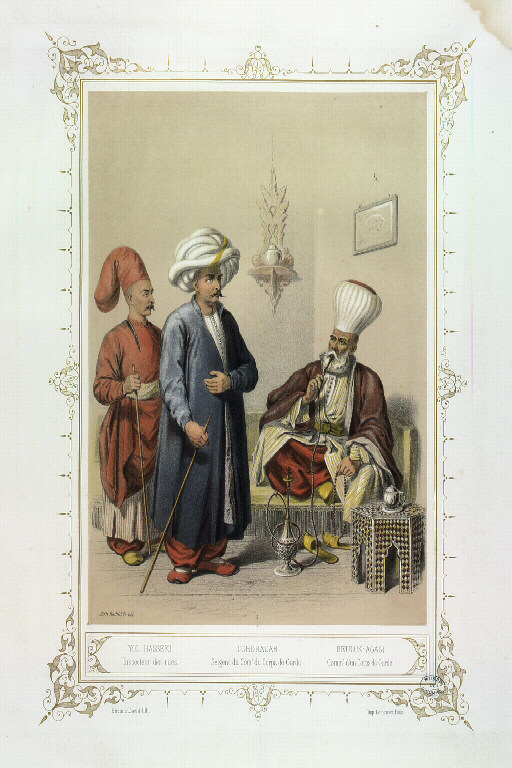

=== Efforts for a new system (1826–1858) ===
The main theme of this period was disbanding the Janissaries, which happened in 1826, an event that had heavily changed the empire’s military culture. The major event is "Vaka-ı Hayriye" translated as Auspicious Incident. The military units formed were used in the Crimean War, the Russo-Turkish War (1877–1878), and the Greco-Turkish War (1897).

The failed efforts of a new system date before 1826. Sultan Selim III formed the Nizam-ı Cedid army (Nizam-ı Cedid meaning New Order) in the late 18th century and early 19th century. This was the first serious attempt to transform the Ottoman military forces into a modern army. However, the Nizam-ı Cedid was short-lived, dissolving after the abdication of Selim III in 1807.

Sultan Mahmud II, Selim III's successor and nephew, who was a great reformer, disbanded the Janissaries in 1826 with so-called known as "Vaka-ı Hayriye" (the auspicious incident).

The Asakir-i Mansure-i Muhammediye was established, as a contemporary modern army.

Egypt, as part of the empire, also underwent drastic military changes during Muhammad Ali Pasha's reign. The two largest military reforms were the effective practices of indoctrination and surveillance, which dramatically changed the way the military was both conducted by the leadership and also perceived by the rest of society. New military law codes resulted in isolation, extreme surveillance, and severe punishments to enforce obedience. The Pasha's goal was to create a high regard for the law and strict obedience stemming from sincere want. This shift from direct control by bodily punishment to indirect control through strict law enforcement aimed to make the soldiers' lives predictable, thus creating a more manageable military for the Pasha.

Units of Modernization (1826–1858)

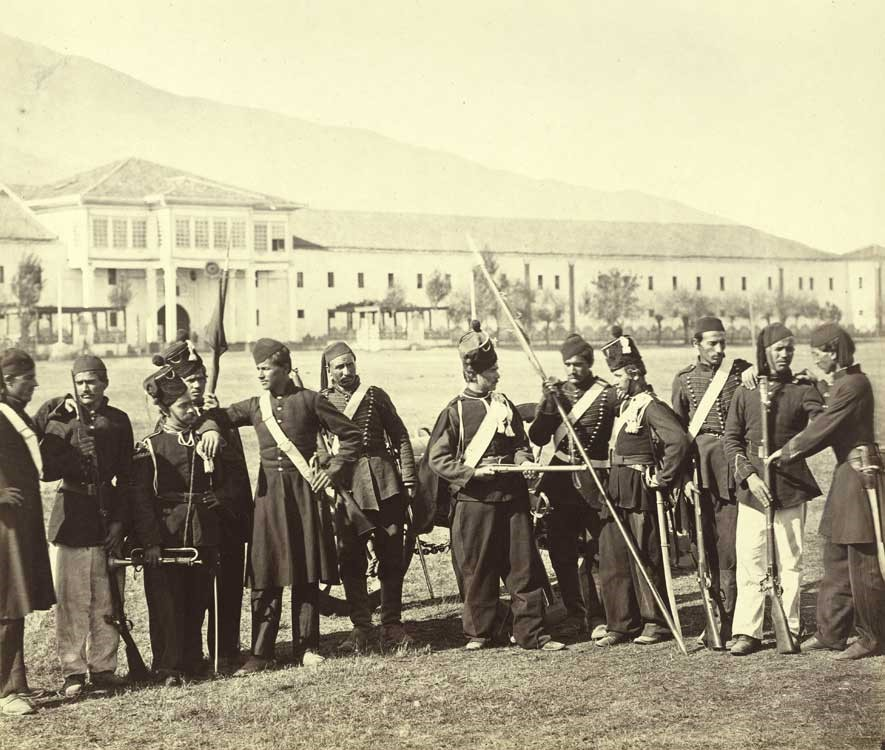
Infantry unit

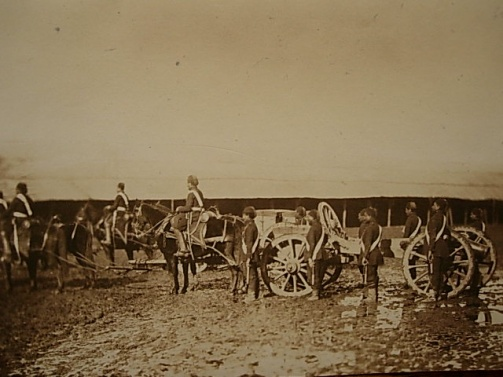
Artillery unit

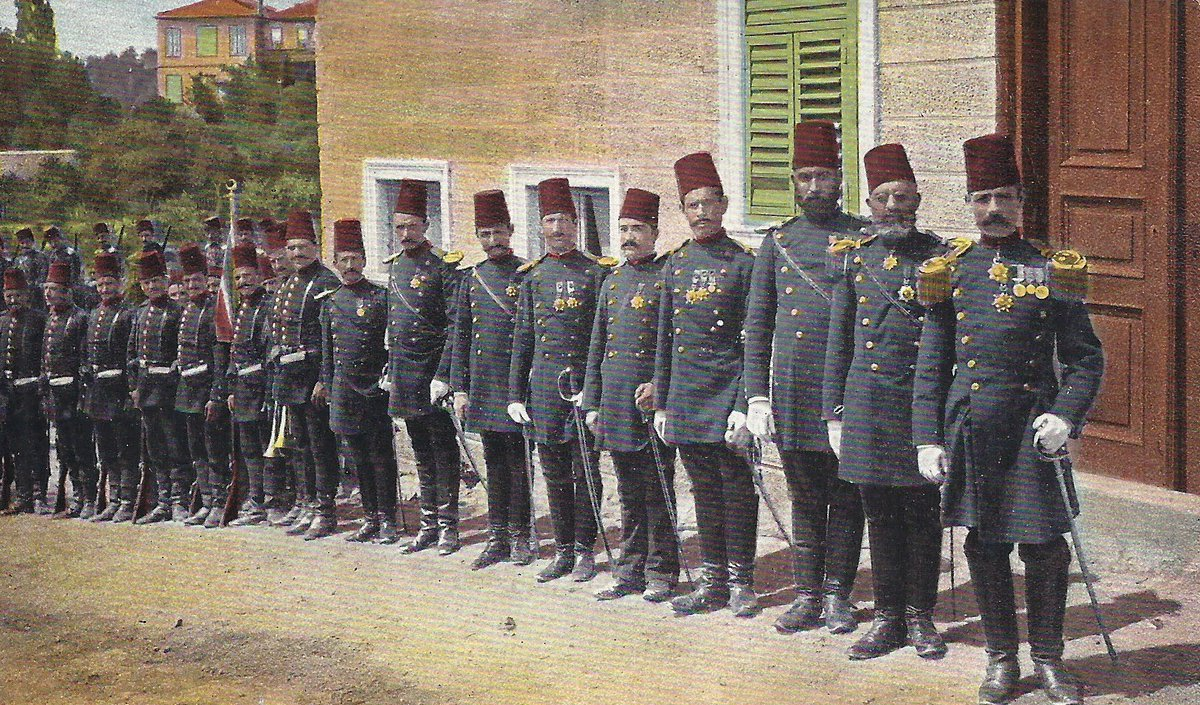
Commissioned Officers

=== Modern Army (1861–1918) ===
The main theme of this period is organizing and training the newly formed units. The change of the French system to the German system occurred as the German military mission was most effective during the period. The military units formed were used in the Balkan Wars and World War I.

The shift from Classical Army (1451–1606) took more than a century beginning from failed attempts of Selim III (1789) to a period of Ottoman military reforms (1826–1858) and finally Abdulhamid II. Abdulhamid II, as early as 1880 sought, and two years later secured, German assistance, which culminated in the appointment of Lt. Col. Kohler. However. Although the consensus that Abdulhamid favored the modernization of the Ottoman army and the professionalization of the officer corps was fairly general, it seems that he neglected the military during the last fifteen years of his reign, and he also cut down the military budget. The formation of Ottoman Modern Army was a slow process with ups and downs.

Combatant branches

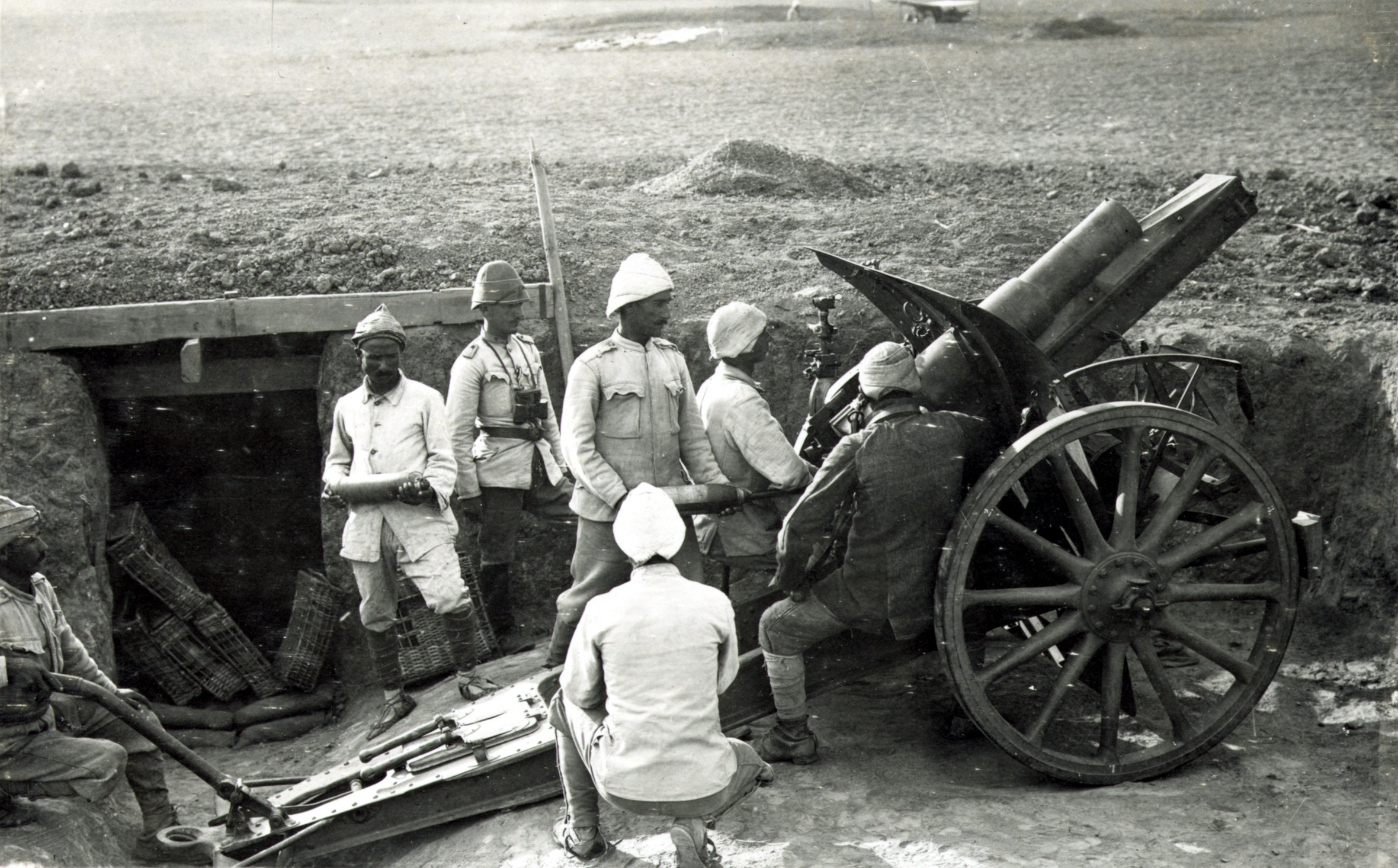
Artillery (Howitzer)

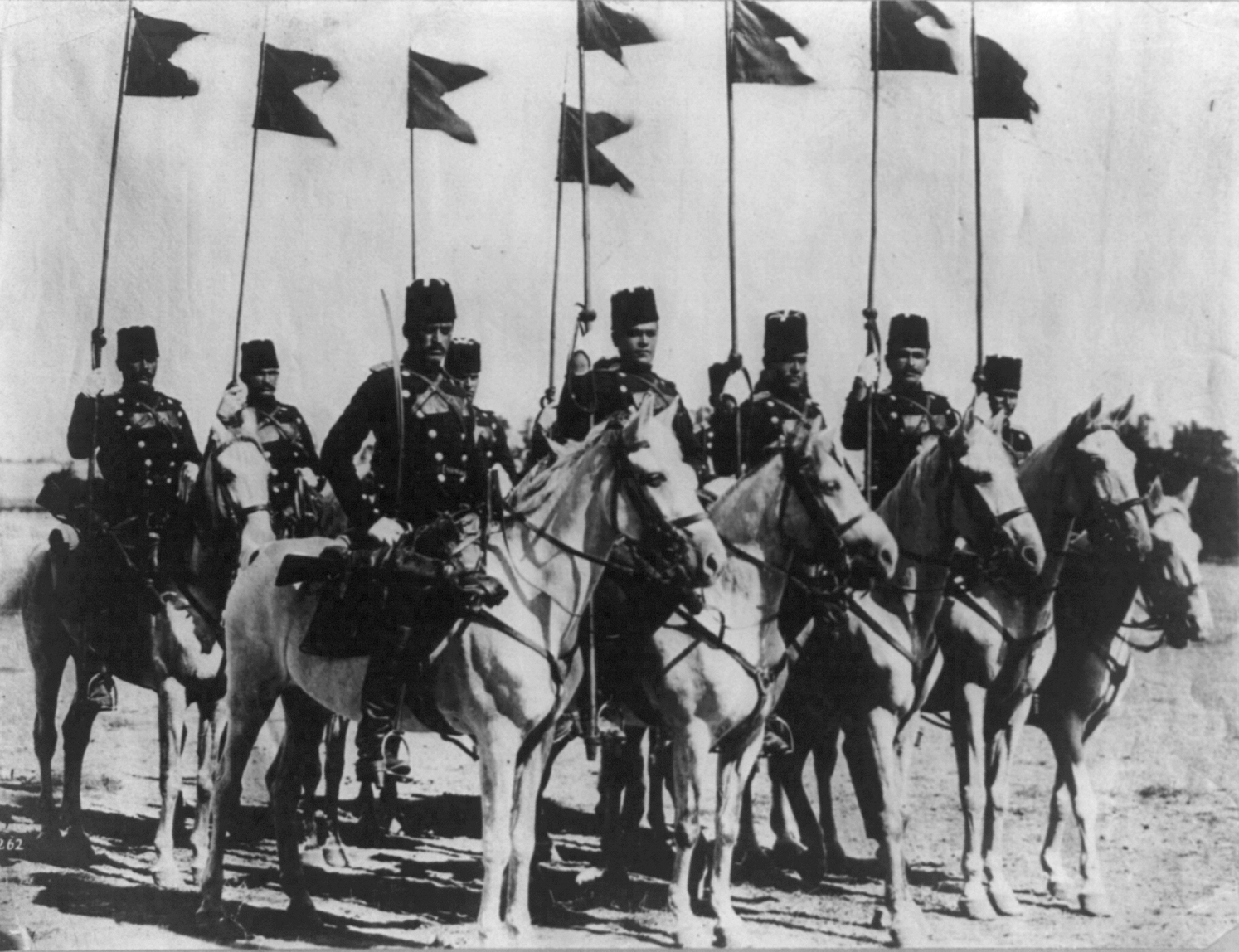
Cavalry

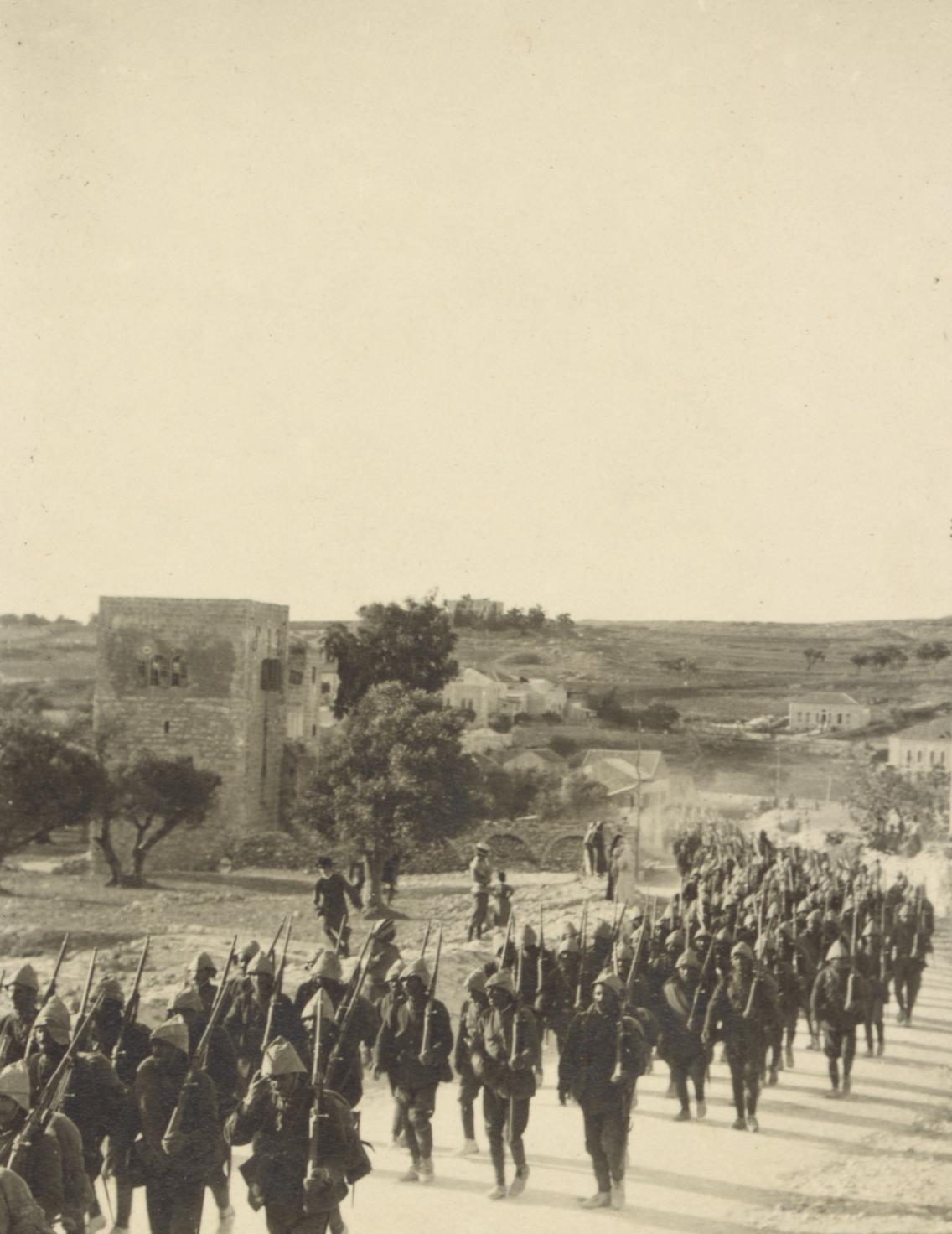
Infantry (WW1)

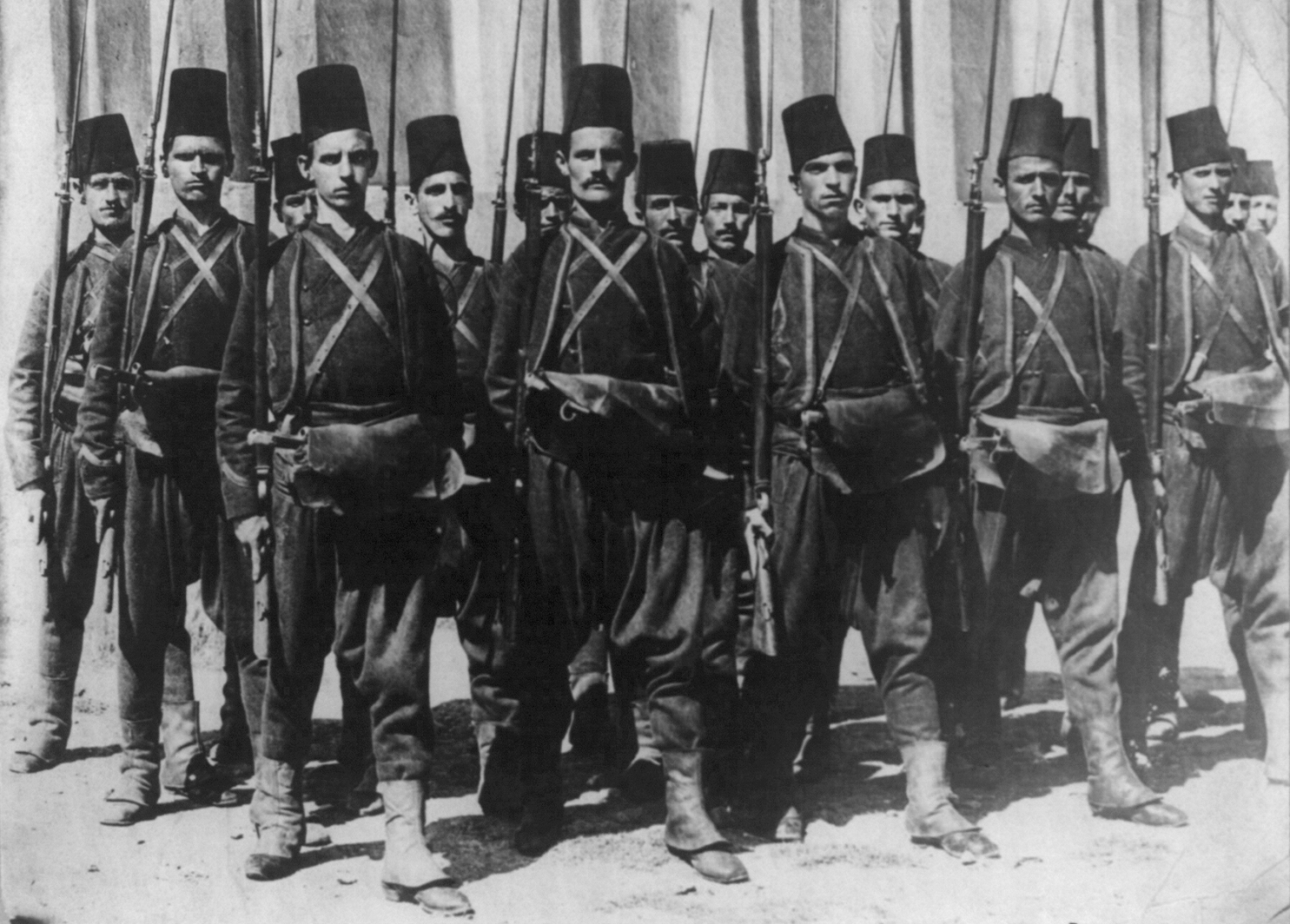
Infantry (pre-war)

Non-combatant branches

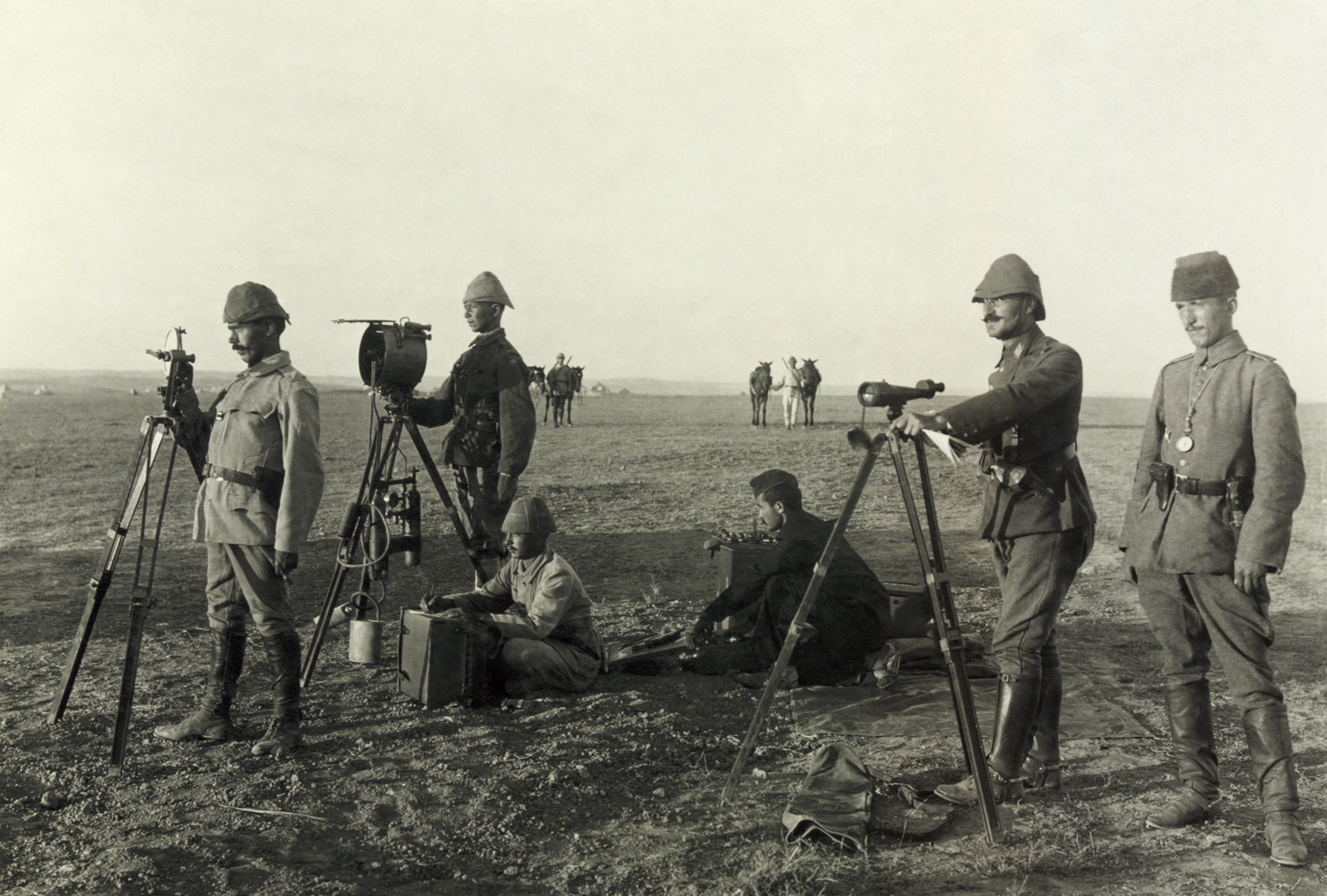
Engineering (Heliograph)

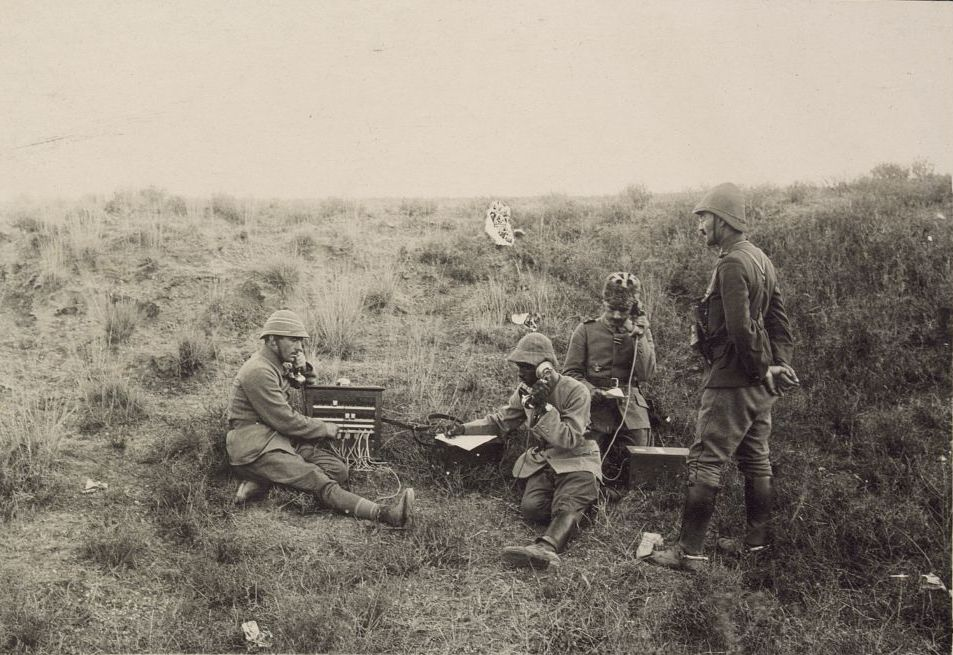
Communication (Telephone)

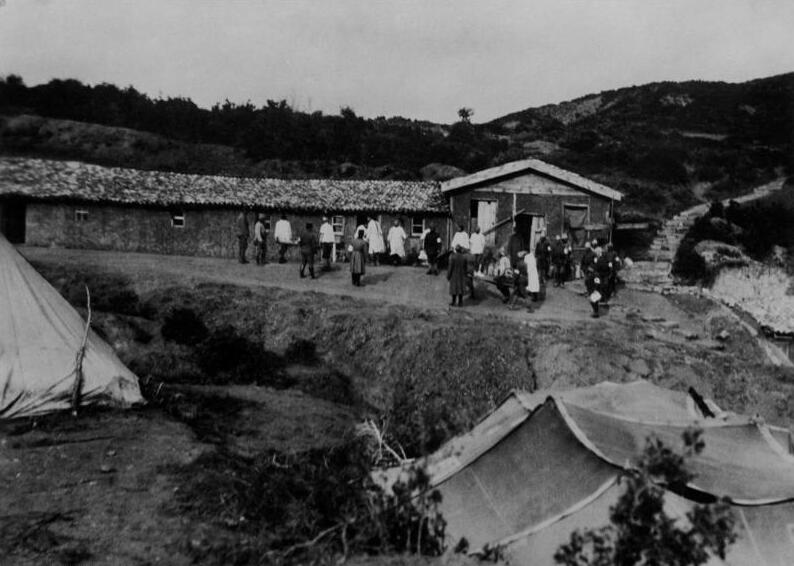
Medical (Field Hospital)

Equipment

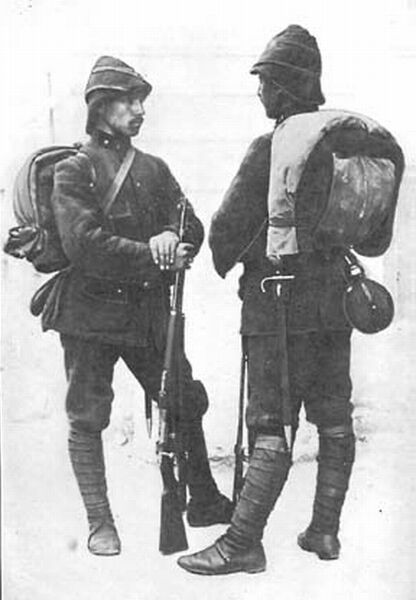
Uniform, standard

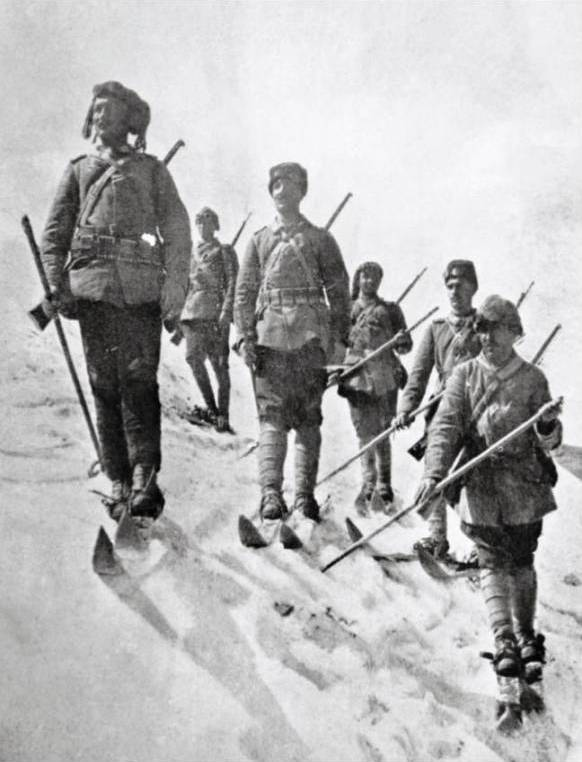
Uniform, winter

Commissioned Officers

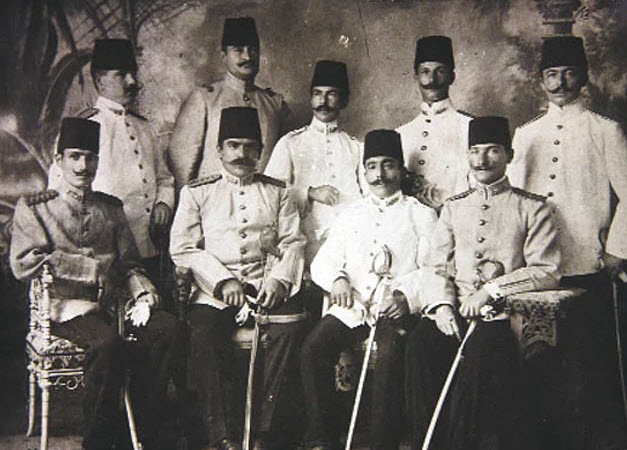
Uniform, summer

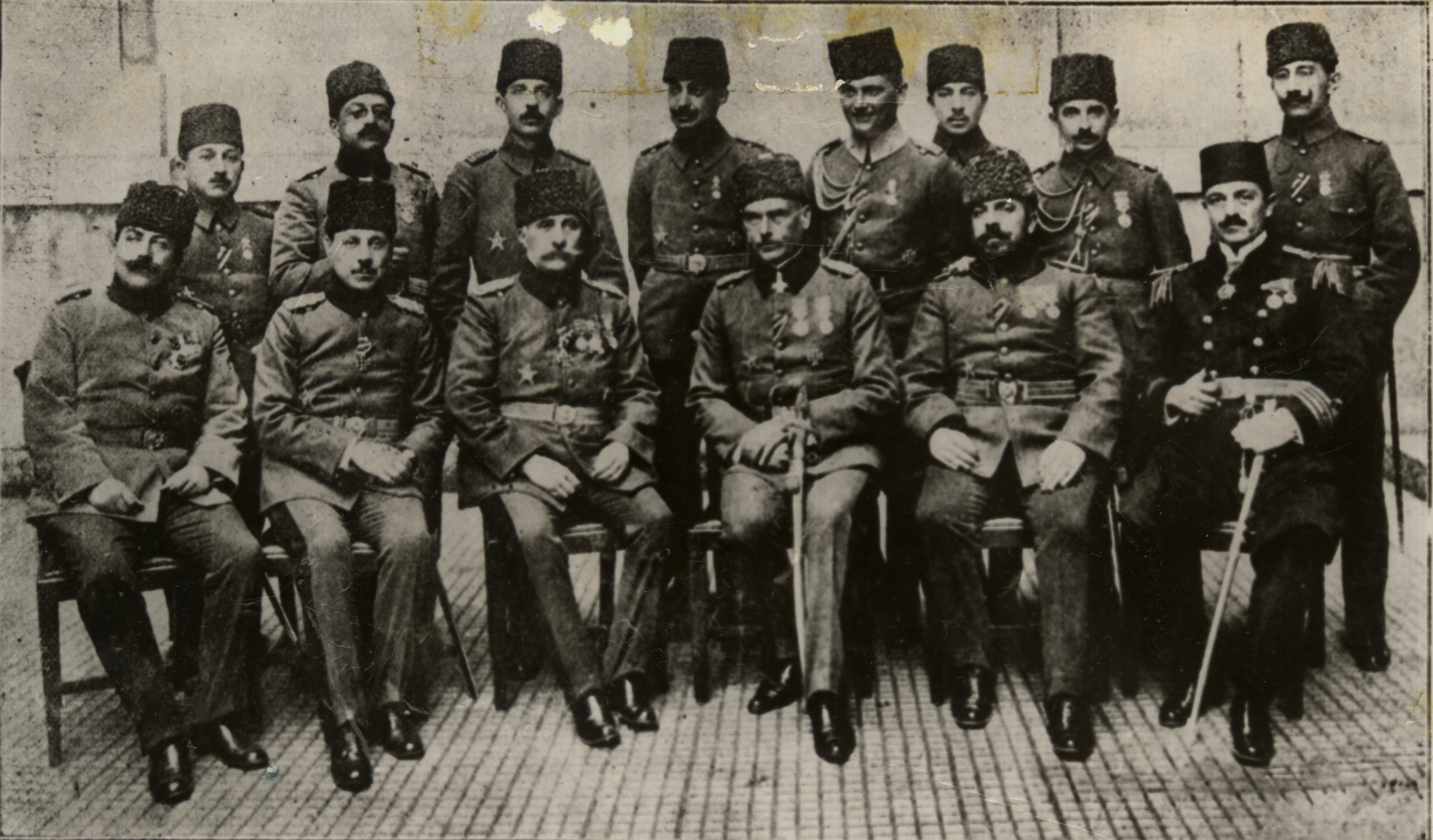
Uniform, standard

== Navy ==
The Ottoman Navy, also known as the Ottoman Fleet, was established in the early 14th century after the empire first expanded to reach the sea in 1323 by capturing Karamürsel, the site of the first Ottoman naval shipyard and the nucleus of the future Navy. During its long existence, it was involved in many conflicts and signed several maritime treaties. At its height, the Navy extended to the Indian Ocean, sending an expedition to Indonesia in 1565.

For much of its history, the Navy was led by the position of the Kapudan Pasha (Grand Admiral; literally "Captain Pasha"). This position was abolished in 1867 when it was replaced by the Minister of the Navy (Turkish: Bahriye Nazırı) and several Fleet Commanders (Turkish: Donanma Komutanları).

After the demise of the Ottoman Empire, the Navy's tradition was continued under the Turkish Naval Forces of the Republic of Turkey in 1923.

Ottoman Navy

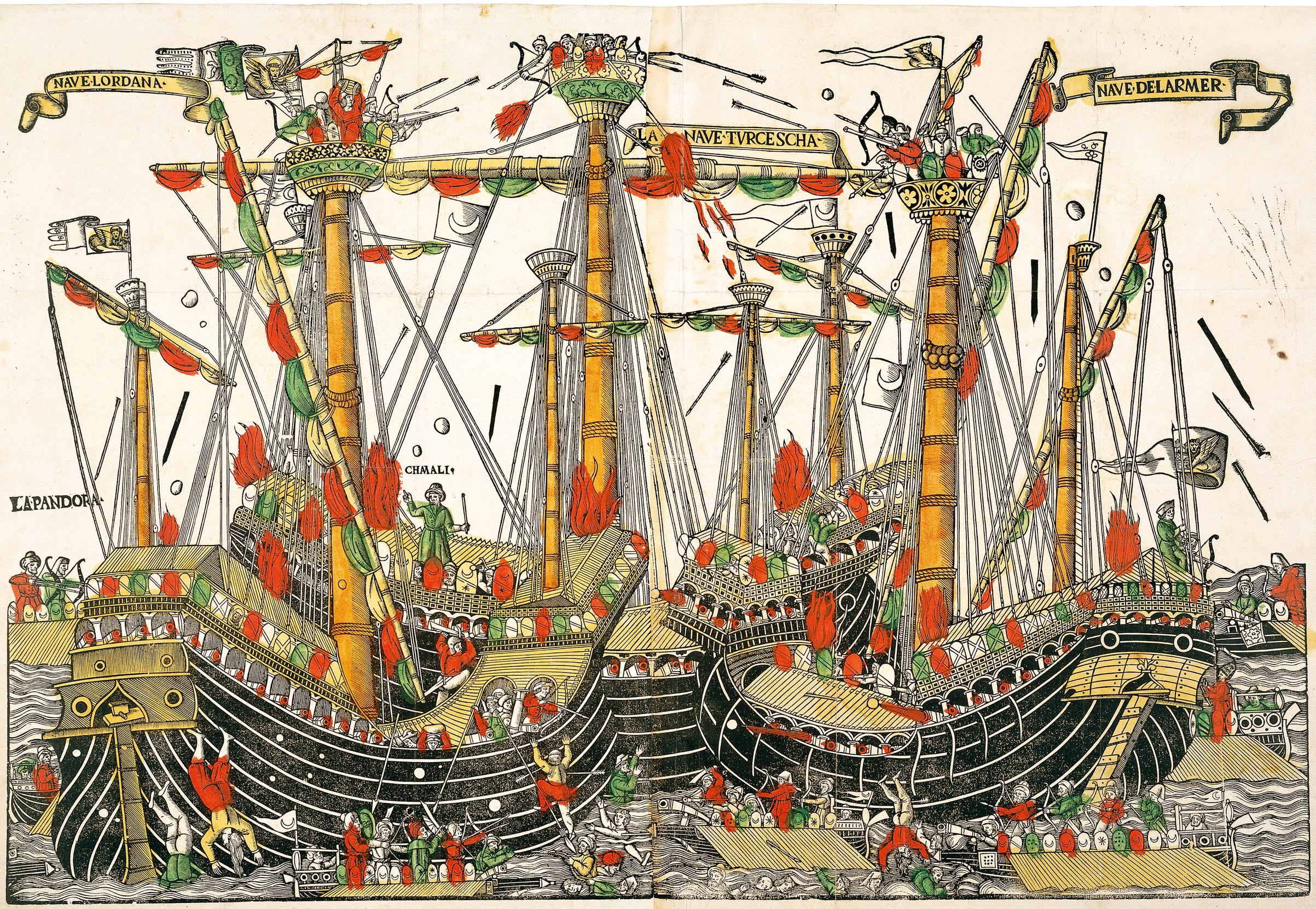
Battle of Zonchio in 1499

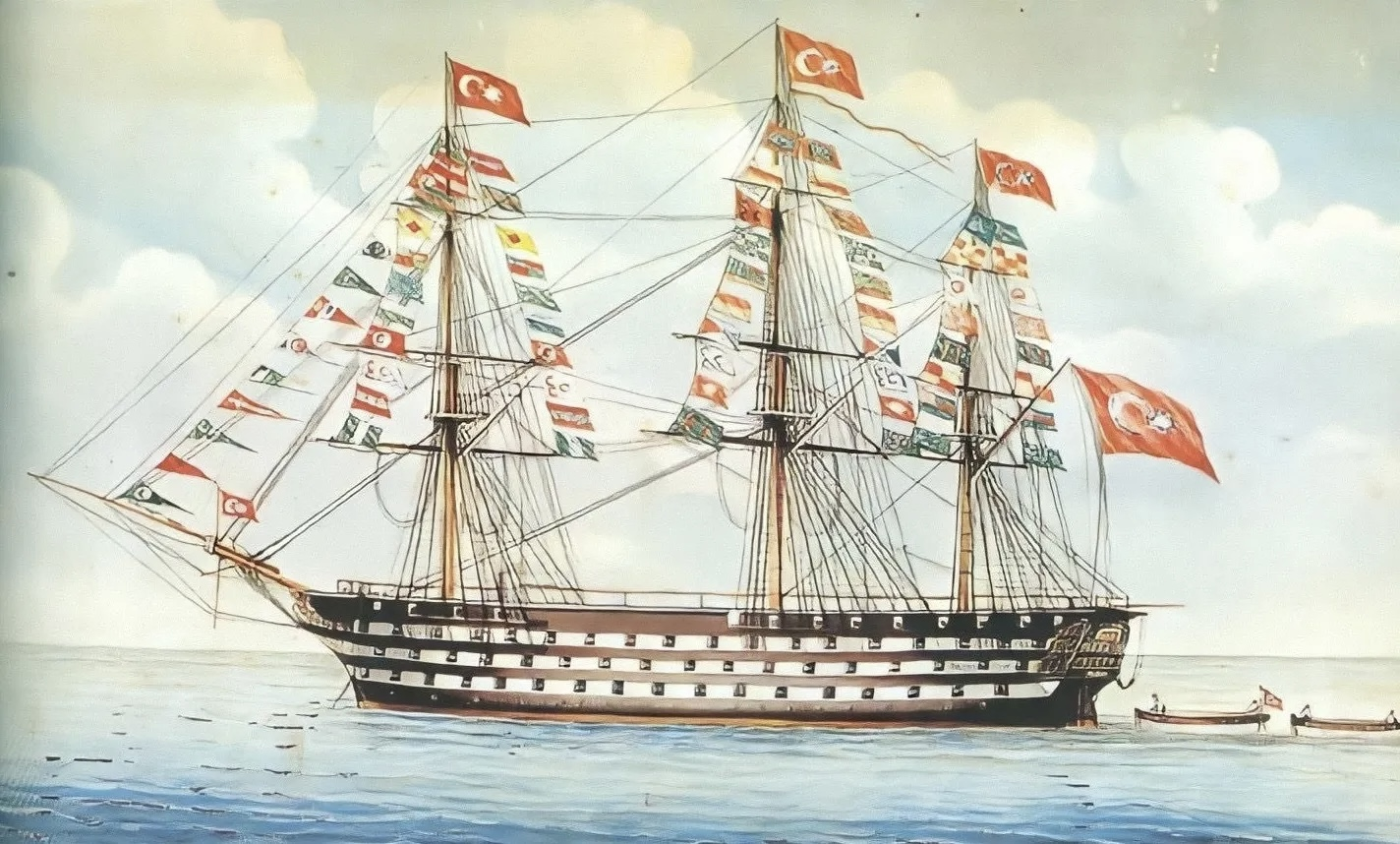
Mahmudiye, 1829

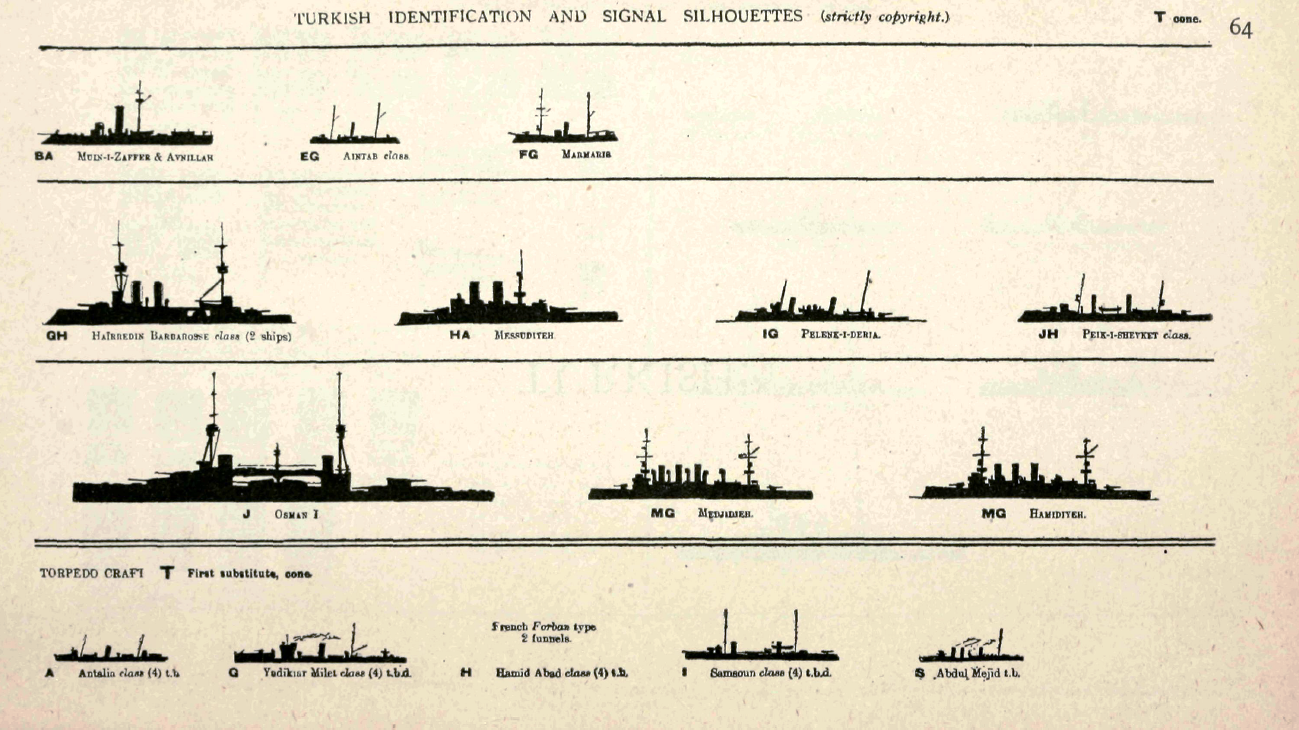
Silhouettes of the warships of the Ottoman Navy, as projected for 1914

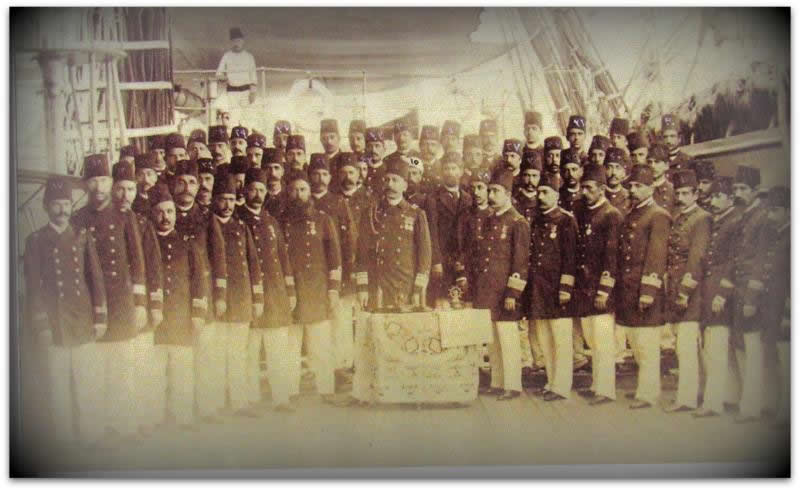
Naval Commissioned Officers, c. 1900

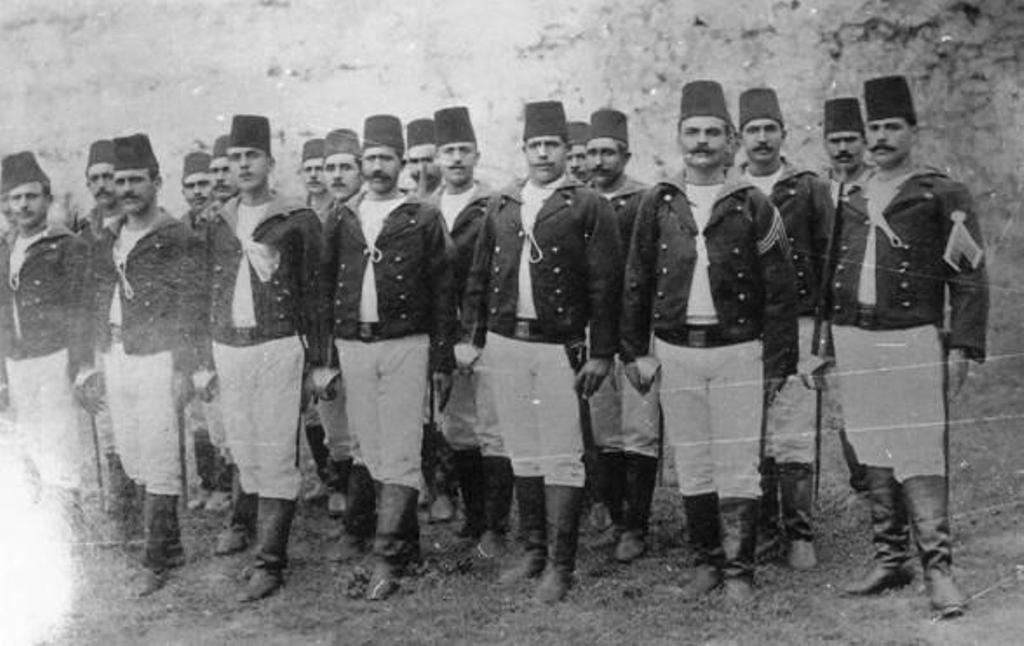
Seaman (pre-war)

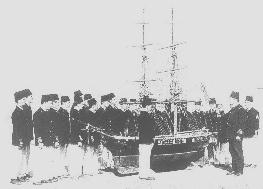
Seaman (WW1)

== Aviation ==
The Ottoman Aviation Squadrons were military aviation units of the Ottoman Army and Navy. The history of Ottoman military aviation dates back to June 1909 or July 1911 depending if active duty assignment is accepted as the establishment. The organisation is sometimes referred to as the Ottoman Air Force. According to Edward J. Erickson, the very term Ottoman Air Force is a gross exaggeration and the term Osmanlı Hava Kuvvetleri (Ottoman Air Force) unfortunately is often repeated in contemporary Turkish sources. The fleet size reached its greatest in December 1916, when the Ottoman aviation squadrons had 90 airplanes. The Aviation Squadrons were reorganized as the "General Inspectorate of Air Forces" (Kuva-yı Havaiye Müfettiş-i Umumiliği) on 29 July 1918. With the signing of the Armistice of Mudros on 30 October 1918, Ottoman military aviation effectively came to an end. At the time of the armistice, the Ottoman military aviation had around 100 pilots; 17 land-based airplane companies (4 planes each); and 3 seaplane companies (4 planes each); totalling 80 aircraft.

Ottoman Aviation Squadrons

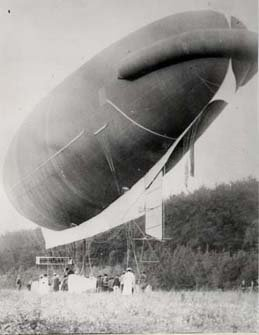
Air Base Yesilkoy 1911

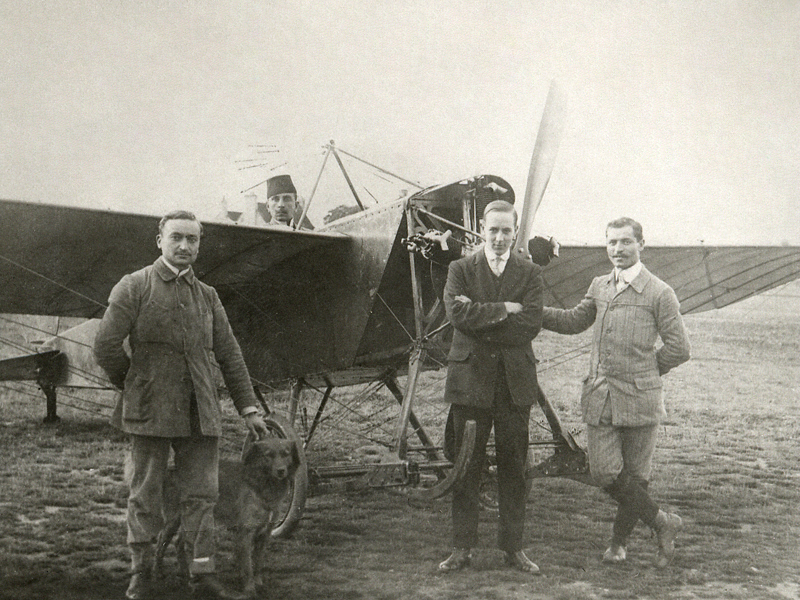
Pilots, 1912

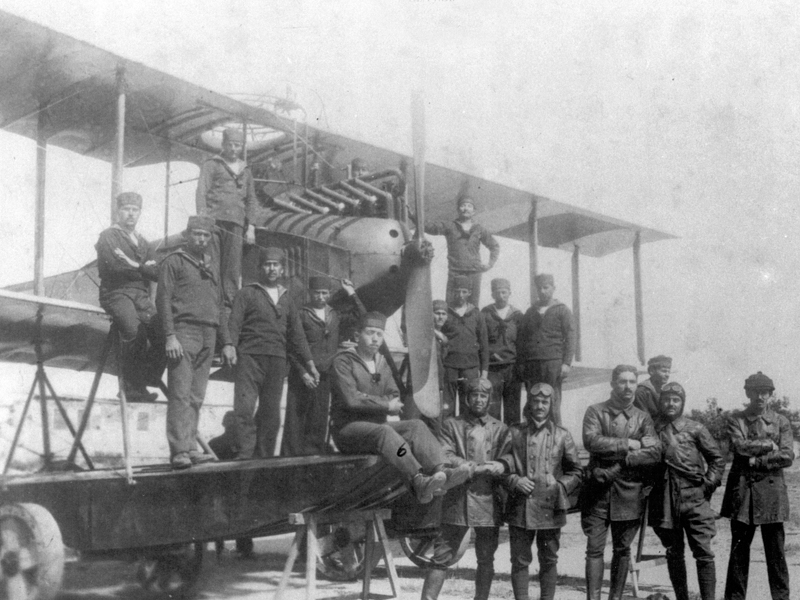
Naval Flight Squadron

== Personnel ==
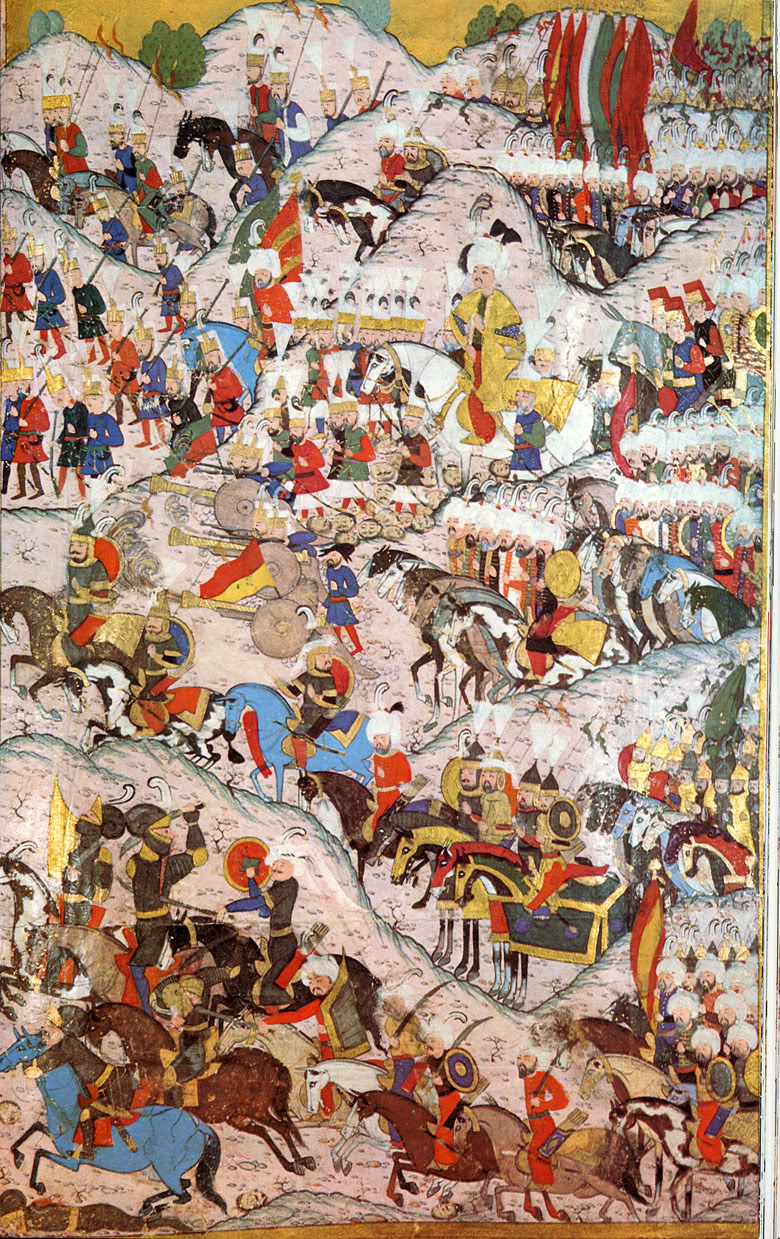
Battle of Mohács in 1526, Ottoman miniature

=== Recruitment ===
In 1389 the Ottomans introduced a system of military conscription. In times of need every town, quarter, and village had the duty to present a fully equipped conscript at the recruiting office. The new force of irregular infantrymen, called Azabs, was used in several different ways. They supported the supplies to the front line, dug roads and built bridges. On rare occasions, they were used as cannon fodder to slow down an enemy advance. A branch of the Azabs were the bashi-bazouk (başıbozuk). These specialized in close combat and were sometimes mounted. Recruited from the homeless, vagrants and criminals, they became notorious for their undisciplined brutality.

=== Training ===
==== Ottoman Military College ====
The Ottoman Military College in Istanbul was the Ottoman Empire's two-year military staff college, which aimed to educate staff officers for the Ottoman Army.

==== Ottoman Military Academy ====
Marshal Ahmed Fevzi Pasha together with Mehmed Namık Pasha formed the academy in 1834 as the Mekteb-i Harbiye (Ottoman Turkish: lit. "War School"), and the first class of officers graduated in 1841. This foundation occurred in the context of military reforms within the Ottoman Empire, which recognized the need for more educated officers to modernize its army. The need for a new military order was part of the reforms of Sultan Mahmud II (r. 1808–1839), continued by his son Sultan Abdulmejid I (r. 1839–1861).

After the demise of the Ottoman Empire, the school renamed itself as Turkish Military Academy under the Republic of Turkey.

==== Imperial Naval Engineering School ====
The origin of the Naval Academy goes back to 1773 when Sultan Mustafa III's Grand Vizier and Admiral Cezayirli Gazi Hasan Pasha founded a naval school under the name of "Naval Engineering at Golden Horn Naval Shipyard". François Baron de Tott, a French officer and advisor to the Ottoman military, was appointed for the establishment of a course to provide education on plane geometry and navigation. The course, attended also by civilian captains of the merchant marine, took place on board a galleon anchored at Kasimpaşa in Istanbul and lasted three months. The temporary course turned into a continuous education on land with the establishment of "Naval Mathematical College" in February 1776. With growing numbers of cadets, the college building at the naval shipyard was extended. On 22 October 1784 the college, renamed the "Imperial Naval Engineering School" (Ottoman Turkish: Mühendishâne-i Bahrî-i Hümâyûn), started its three-year education courses in the new building. From 1795 on, the training was divided into navigation and cartography for officers of the deck, and naval architecture and shipbuilding for naval engineers. In 1838 the naval school moved into its new building in Kasımpaşa. With the beginning (1839) of the reformation efforts, the school was renamed "Naval School" (Ottoman Turkish: Mekteb-i Bahriye) and continued to operate in Kasımpaşa for 12 years. Then it was relocated in 1850 to Heybeliada for the last time. During the Second Constitutional Era, an upgraded education system was adopted in 1909 by the Royal Naval Academy.

After the demise of the Ottoman Empire, the school renamed itself as Naval Academy (Turkey) under the Republic of Turkey

=== Ranks ===
==== Classic Army ====
- Aghas commanded the different branches of the military services, for example: "azap agha", "besli agha", "janissary agha", for the commanders of azaps, beslis, and janissaries, respectively. This designation was given to commanders of smaller military units, too, for instance the "bölük agha", and the "ocak agha", the commanders of a "bölük" (company) and an "ocak" (troop) respectively.
- Boluk-bashi was a commander of a "bölük", equivalent to the rank of captain.
- Çorbacı (Turkish for "soup server") was a commander of an orta (regiment), approximately corresponding to the rank of colonel (Turkish: Albay) today. In seafaring, the term was in use for the boss of a ship's crew, a role similar to that of boatswain.

==== Modern army ====
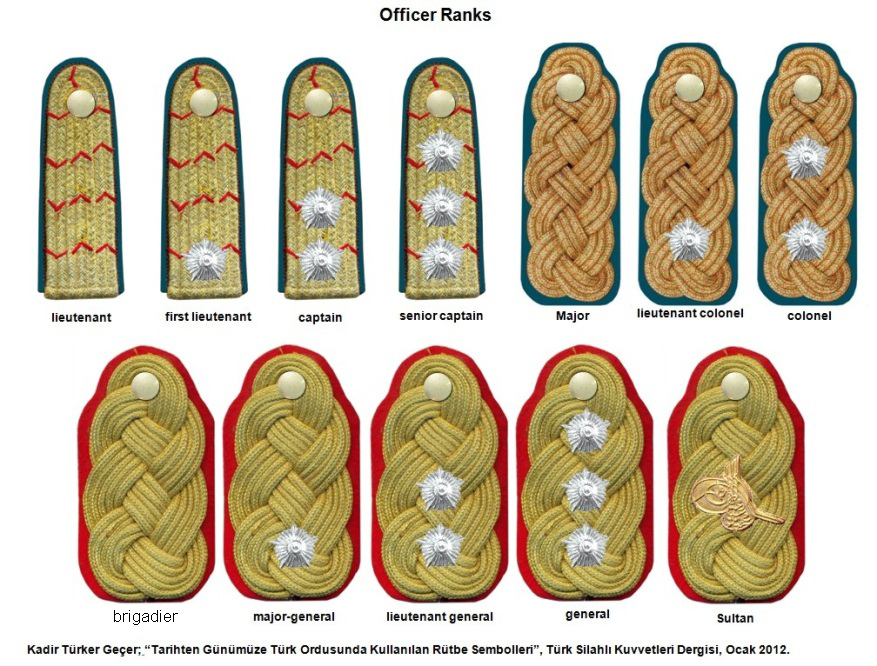
Rank insignia for officers in the army

The system of ranks and insignia followed the patterns of the German Empire.

- Nefer (Private)
- Onbaşı (Corporal)
- Çavuş (Sergeant)
- Başçavuş (Sergeant major)
- Mülazım-ı Sani (Second lieutenant)
- Mülazım-ı Evvel (First lieutenant)
- Yüzbaşı (Captain)
- Kolağası (Senior captain or Adjutant Major)
- Binbaşı (Major)
- Kaymakam (Lieutenant colonel)
- Miralay (Colonel) – commander of a regiment (alay)
- Mirliva – commander of a brigade (liva)
- Ferik – commander of a division (firka)
- Birinci Ferik – commander of a corps (Kolordu)
- Müşir (Field marshal) – commander of an army (Ordu)

== Strength ==
Ottoman Army Strength, 1299–1826
Year	Yaya & Musellem	Azab	Akıncı	Timarli Sipahi	(Total) Timarli Sipahi & Cebelu	Janissary	Kapikulu Sipahi	Other Kapikulu	(Total) Kapikulu	Fortress guards, Martalos and Navy	Sekban	Nizam-ı Cedid	Total Strength of Ottoman Army
1350	1,000 est.	1,000 est.	3,500 est.	200 est.	500 est.	—	—	—	—	—	—	—	6,000 est.
1389	4,000 est.	8,000 est.	10,000 est.	5,000 est.	10,000 est.	500 est.	250 est.	250 est.	1,000 est.	4,000 est.	—	—	37,000 est.
1402	8,000 est.	15,000 est.	10,000 est.	20,000 est.	40,000 est.	1,000 est.	500 est.	500 est.	2,000 est.	6,000 est.	—	—	81,000 est.
1453	8,000 est.	15,000 est.	10,000 est.	20,000 est.	40,000 est.	6,000	2,000 est.	4,000 est.	12,000 est.	9,000 est.	—	—	94,000 est.
1528	8,180	20,000 est.	12,000	37,741	80,000 est.	12,000 est.	5,000 est.	7,000 est.	24,146	23,017	—	—	105,084–167,343 est.
1574	8,000 est.	20,000 est.	15,000 est.	40,000 est.	90,000 est.	13,599	5,957	9,619	29,175	30,000 est.	—	—	192,175 est.
1607/ 1609	(Note: (Yaya & Musellem) Yaya, light infantry, Musellem, light cavalry, over time they lost their original martial qualities and were employed only at such tasks as transportation or founding cannonballs. The organisation was totally abolished in 1582.)	(Note: (Azab) light infantry, during the last quarter of the 16th century, the Azabs disappeared from the Ottoman documentary record.)	(Note: (Akıncı) light cavalry, the Akıncıs continued to serve until 1595 when after a major rout in Wallachia they were dissolved by Grand Vezir Koca Sinan Paşa.)	44,404 (1607) 50,000 est. (1609)	105,339 (1607) 137,000 (1609)	37,627 (1609)	20,869 (1609)	17,372 (1609)	75,868 (1609)	25,000 est.	10,000 est.	—	196,207–247,868 est.
1670	(Note: (Yaya & Musellem) Yaya, light infantry, Musellem, light cavalry, over time they lost their original martial qualities and were employed only at such tasks as transportation or founding cannonballs. The organisation was totally abolished in 1582.)	(Note: (Azab) light infantry, during the last quarter of the 16th century, the Azabs disappeared from the Ottoman documentary record.)	(Note: (Akıncı) light cavalry, the Akıncıs continued to serve until 1595 when after a major rout in Wallachia they were dissolved by Grand Vezir Koca Sinan Paşa.)	22,000 est.	50,000 est.	39,470	14,070	16,756	70,296	25,000 est.	10,000 est.	—	70,296–155,296 est.
1807	(Note: (Yaya & Musellem) Yaya, light infantry, Musellem, light cavalry, over time they lost their original martial qualities and were employed only at such tasks as transportation or founding cannonballs. The organisation was totally abolished in 1582.)	(Note: (Azab) light infantry, during the last quarter of the 16th century, the Azabs disappeared from the Ottoman documentary record.)	(Note: (Akıncı) light cavalry, the Akıncıs continued to serve until 1595 when after a major rout in Wallachia they were dissolved by Grand Vezir Koca Sinan Paşa.)	400 est.	1,000 est.	15,000 est.	500 est.	500 est.	16,000 est.	15,000 est.	10.000 est.	25,000	25,000–67,000 est.
1826	(Note: (Yaya & Musellem) Yaya, light infantry, Musellem, light cavalry, over time they lost their original martial qualities and were employed only at such tasks as transportation or founding cannonballs. The organisation was totally abolished in 1582.)	(Note: (Azab) light infantry, during the last quarter of the 16th century, the Azabs disappeared from the Ottoman documentary record.)	(Note: (Akıncı) light cavalry, the Akıncıs continued to serve until 1595 when after a major rout in Wallachia they were dissolved by Grand Vezir Koca Sinan Paşa.)	400 est.	1,000 est.	15,000 est.	500 est.	500 est.	16,000 est.	15,000 est.	15,000 est.	—	47,000 est.

== Awards and decorations ==
The Ottoman War Medal, better known as the Gallipoli Star, was instituted by the Sultan Mehmed Reshad V on 1 March 1915 for gallantry in battle. The Iftikhar Sanayi Medal was first granted by Sultan Abdulhamid II. Order of the Medjidie was instituted in 1851 by Sultan Abdülmecid I. The Order of Osmanieh was created in January 1862 by Sultan Abdulaziz. This became the second highest order with the obsolescence of the Nişan-i Iftikhar. The Order of Osmanieh ranks below the Nişan-i Imtiyaz.

== See also ==
- Ottoman military reforms
- Turkish Armed Forces
- Turkish Land Forces
- Foreign relations of the Ottoman Empire
- Special Organization (Ottoman Empire)
- List of wars involving the Ottoman Empire
- Janissary, elite infantry units forming the Ottoman sultan's household troops
- Akinji, irregular military scouts of Ottoman Empire
- Sipahi, cavalrymen used by Seljuk Turks and later by Ottoman Empire

== Bibliography and further reading ==
- Ágoston, Gábor (2005). Guns for the Sultan: Military Power and the Weapons Industry in the Ottoman Empire. Cambridge: Cambridge University Press. ISBN 978-0521843133.
- Dupuy, R. Ernest and Trevor N. Dupuy. The Encyclopedia of Military History from 3500 B.C. to the Present (1986 and other editions), passim and 1463–1464.
- Erickson, Edward J. (April 2008). "The Armenians and Ottoman Military Policy, 1915". War in History. 15 (2): 141–167. doi:10.1177/0968344507087001. JSTOR 26070763. S2CID 159817669.
- Erickson, Edward J. Ordered to die: a history of the Ottoman army in the First World War (2001)
- Hall, Richard C. ed. War in the Balkans: An Encyclopedic History from the Fall of the Ottoman Empire to the Breakup of Yugoslavia (2014)
- Har-El, Shai (1995). Struggle for Domination in the Middle East: The Ottoman-Mamluk War, 1485–91. Leiden: E.J. Brill. ISBN 978-9004101807.
- McNeill, William H. (1993). "The Age of Gunpowder Empires, 1450–1800". In Adas, Michael (ed.). Islamic & European Expansion: The Forging of a Global Order. Philadelphia: Temple University Press. pp. 103–139. JSTOR 544368.
- Miller, William. The Ottoman Empire and its successors, 1801–1922 (2nd ed 1927) online, strong on foreign policy
- Murphey, Rhoads (1999). Ottoman Warfare, 1500–1700. Rutgers University Press. ISBN 978-0813526850.
- Needham, Joseph (1986), Science & Civilisation in China, vol. V:7: The Gunpowder Epic, Cambridge University Press, ISBN 0-521-30358-3.
- Pálosfalvi, Tamás. From Nicopolis to Mohács: A History of Ottoman-Hungarian Warfare, 1389–1526 (Brill, 2018)
- Streusand, Douglas E. (2011). Islamic Gunpowder Empires: Ottomans, Safavids, and Mughals. Philadelphia: Westview Press. ISBN 978-0813313597.
- Topal, Ali E. "The effects of German Military Commission and Balkan wars on the reorganization and modernization of the Ottoman Army" (Naval Postgraduate School 2013) online
- Uyar, Mesut, and Edward J. Erickson. A Military History of the Ottomans: From Osman to Atatürk (Pleager Security International, 2009).
