= Mansure Army =

Glorious Soldiers of Muhammad
- Asâkir-i Mansûre-i Muhammediye (عساكر منصورهٔ محمديه)
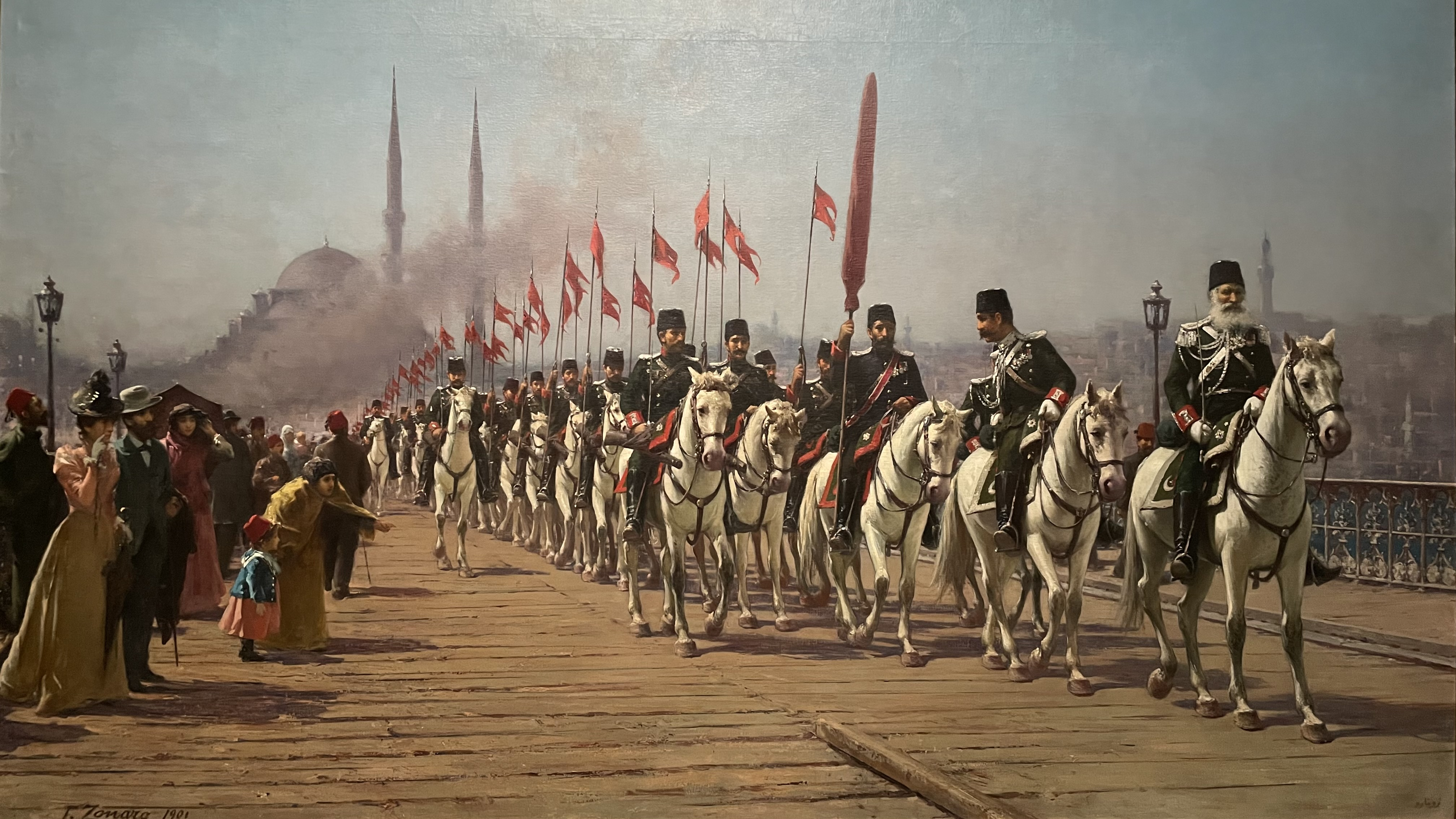
- Asakir-i Mansure-i Muhammediye uniforms, Ertuğrul cavalry regiment crossing the Galata Bridge
- Active: July 7, 1826 – 1920
- Disbanded: 1918–1920 (Armistice of Mudros–Turkish War of Independence) (Integrated into Army of GNA)
- Country: Ottoman Empire
- Size: 350,000 (1877), 1,000,000 (1915)
- Garrison/HQ: Constantinople and Selanik (Thessaloniki)
- Nickname: Nizami Ordu (Regular Army)
- Engagements: Crimean War; Russo-Turkish War (1877–1878); Greco-Turkish War (1897); Balkan Wars; World War One

Commanders
- Notable commanders: Agha Hussein Pasha (Ağa Hüseyin Paşa, 1826–?)

The Mansure Army (Ottoman Turkish: عساكر منصورهٔ محمديه, romanized: Asâkir-i Mansûre-i Muhammediye, "The Victorious Soldiers of Muhammad") was initially an ocak (military unit) of the Ottoman army but later became a new army force. It was established by Mahmud II, who also disbanded the Janissary Corps.

After The Auspicious Incident and the disbandment of the Janissary Corps, Mahmud II established a new military ocak and Agha Hussein Pasha was appointed to the command of the corps. Koca Hüsrev Mehmed Pasha served as their serasker. The foundations of the modern Turkish Army were laid during the reign of Sultan Mahmud II. After the Janissary Corps, which was outdated and could not adapt to the times, was abolished with the Auspicious Incident (June 15, 1826), Sultan Mahmud II ordered the establishment of Asakir-i Mansure-i Muhammediye (Victorious Soldiers of Muhammad). By embarking on a rapid modernization effort that took the military and technical developments in Europe as an example, the new army decree was approved by Sultan Mahmud II on July 7, 1826, and the Asâkir-i Mansûre-i Muhammediyye Army, the modern army of the empire, was established. After this date, Sultan Mahmud II accelerated his reform efforts and started to establish schools and institutions to support the new army. The Seraskerlik institution, a high military command, was established by Mahmud II in 1826 to fulfill the duties of the commander-in-chief, and on 14 March 1827, Imperial Military School of Medicine, which is the basis of Turkey's first medical faculty and modern military hospital Gülhane Training and Research Hospital, was established to meet the army's need for physicians and surgeons. Harbiye Military School was later established in 1834 as a modern officer school modeled on the French and Prussian armies, taught by European instructors.

The name of the army was changed to Asâkir-i Nizâmiye-i Şâhâne (Royal Regular Soldiers) by Sultan Abdülmecid on 14 June 1843. From this date onwards, the army began to be known simply as the Nizami Ordu (Regular Army).

From its establishment, the army was commanded by the Serasker, whose office combined the roles of commander-in-chief and minister of war. Following the modernization reforms, the technical and strategic planning of the army was managed by the Ottoman General Staff (Erkân-ı Harbiye-i Umûmiye Riyaseti), established in 1880 to transition the military into a modern professional structure.

Mahmud II was not the first sultan who started the modernisation of the Ottoman army. Despite this, the Mansure Army became the main army corps of the Ottoman Empire until the World War One era. In 1912, the uniforms of the ocak were changed and finally in 1920, the Ottoman army joined the Turkish National Movement. After May 3, 1920, Mansure Army officers and soldiers began to join the Turkish Government of the Grand National Assembly. When the Republic was declared on 29 October 1923, the Mansure Army transformed into the modern Turkish Army.

== Background ==
Before their abolition in 1826, the Janissary corps fiercely opposed attempts by the Sultan and the government to reform the military. This tension between the Janissaries and the state often resulted in violence. In Edirne incident of 1806, the government dispatched a small army to Edirne in order to establish the first headquarters of the New Order Troops in Tekfurdağı in Ottoman Europe (Rum). This action provoked the Janissaries, local notables, and conservatives into rallying local troops against the New Order Troops, forcing the government’s soldiers to retreat back to Istanbul. This was followed by a rebellion in 1807, where the Janissaries marched into the capital. They demanded that Selim III abolish the New Order and then forced the Sultan to abdicate, installing the more conservative-minded Mustafa IV as Sultan and effectively ending that period of reform.

The reactionaries only held power for a short time before a rebellion led by a powerful notable Albanian Alemdar Mustafa Pasha, seized control of the capital in July 1808. Alemdar Mustafa and his forces deposed Mustafa IV, executed many Janissaries, banished anti-reform leaders, and installed Mahmud II as the new sultan. Mahmud II made Alemdar Mustafa his Grand Vizier. Together they restarted the reform movement. Alemdar Mustafa oversaw the reformation of the new army, placed new regulations on the Janissaries, and sought to strengthen ties between the center and the periphery of the empire by requesting that notables obey the central government.

The Janissaries resistance, however, remained fierce. In November 1808, they revolted again. The Janissaries killed Alemdar Mustafa, lynched reformist leaders, and forced Mahmud II to abolish the new army.

Janissary resistance to reform finally came to an end following the Auspicious Incident in 1826 when Mahmud II obtained a fatwa sanctioning the slaughter of the Janissaries and the abolition of the corps. The destruction of the Janissary corps opened the door to a new period of Ottoman military reform. The state began recruitment for a new European-style army, the Asakir-i Mansure-i Muhammediye (Victorious Troops of Muhammad). The state also began centralization of the military. In 1834, the state established reserve armies in the Anatolian and Rumelian provinces. In 1838, the government created a Military Council to oversee all of the empire’s military activity. Finally, they disbanded provincial armies, making the new army the only military organization in the empire.

== Reform ==
The state planned to create an army based upon discipline and drill. The Ottomans invited many skilled officers from Europe to train recruits in European drill and maneuvers. In addition to infantry training, the new army developed regular cavalry squadrons which adopted the methods of Hungarian Hussars. Eventually the government devoted institutions to the study of military science and tactics. The Military School for Officers was inaugurated in 1836 and an artillery school opened soon after in 1837. In addition, the Ottomans sent cadets abroad to study at military institutions in Paris, London, Vienna, and Berlin.

With a new military order published on 8 September 1843, the establishment of five field armies was announced for the first time; Hassa, Dersaadet, Rumeli, Anadolu and Arabistan. The plan was to have a total of nearly 150,000 soldiers within these five armies, but since this number was deemed impossible, the number of soldiers was reduced. The army was formed to consist of 98,880 infantry, 22,000 cavalry, and 8,120 artillerymen. The infantry units were organized into 30 regiments of 3,296 soldiers each, the cavalry into 20 regiments of 1,100 privates each, and the artillery into five regiments of 1,624 privates each. Hassa army had 27,226 soldiers and was stationed in Üsküdar, İzmir, Manisa, Isparta, and Kütahya. Dersaadet Army had a total of 24,190 soldiers and was stationed in the capital, as well as in Edirne, Ankara, Konya, Kastamonu, and Bozok. Rumelian Army had 23,764 soldiers and was stationed in Monastir, Ioannina, Shumen, Babadag, Sofia, Thessaloniki, Beysehir, Vidin, and Niš. Anatolia Army had 25,800 soldiers and was stationed in Sivas, Elazığ, Erzurum, Diyarbekir, Kars, Van, and Muş. Arabistan Army had 25,800 soldiers and was stationed in Damascus, Saida, Aleppo, Maraş, Raqqa, Adana, and Jerusalem. With the reforms implemented in 1869, the armies' names were abolished and they were numbered. The number of field armies was also increased from five to seven. Kuleli Military High School was opened in 1845. In 1848, Erkan-ı Harbiye Military Academy was opened to train Staff Officers. In 1880, Erkân-ı Harbiye-i Umûmiye Riyaseti, which is equivalent to today's General Staff, was established. In 1908, the name of the Seraskerlik institution was changed to the Ministry of War and the reform efforts reached their peak. First Army, Second Army, and Third Army within the Turkish land forces define 1843 as their official founding date and base their institutional identities on the reforms of Abdülmecid. This is also reflected in other units of the Turkish army, especially military schools, which base their institutional history on the reform and modernization efforts undertaken by Mahmud II and Abdülmecid.

== See also ==
- Ottoman Army (1861–1922)
