= Şehzade Bayezid (son of Ahmed I) =

Ottoman prince (1612–1635)

- Born: December 1612; Istanbul, Ottoman Empire (modern day Istanbul, Turkey)
- Died: 27 July 1635 (aged 22); Istanbul, Ottoman Empire
- Burial: Ahmed I Mausoleum, Sultan Ahmed Mosque
- Father: Ahmed I
- Mother: Mahfiruz Hatun
- Religion: Sunni Islam

Şehzade Bayezid (Ottoman Turkish: شهزاده بايزيد; December 1612 – 27 July 1635) was an Ottoman prince, son of Sultan Ahmed I and his first consort Mahfiruz Hatun.

== Life ==
He was born in December 1612 to Ahmed I by his first consort Mahfiruz.

He was a few months younger than his half-brother Şehzade Murad (future sultan Murad IV). When Ahmed died on 22 November 1617, he was placed in the Kafes with his brothers Mehmed, Murad, Süleyman, Kasim and Ibrahim in unknown period during the reign of his uncle sultan Mustafa I and brother Osman II. After Mustafa was deposed and replaced by Osman, his half-brother Mehmed was executed on the orders of Osman one year before being murdered by his enemies, which brought Mustafa once again to the throne. After Mustafa was deposed for a second time, Bayezid's half-brother Murad was placed on the throne before him on account of being a few months older. Years later, on 27 July 1635, he was executed along with his brother Suleiman. The executions were ordered by Murad, because he had reason to believe that the janissaries were about to rebel to overthrow him.

== Death ==
He was executed on the orders of Murad, on 27 July 1635, along with his brother Şehzade Süleyman in Topkapı Palace due to some rumors that Murad's enemies wanted Bayezid enthroned. He was buried in the Ahmed I Mausoleum, Sultan Ahmed Mosque.

== In literature and popular culture ==
- Jean Racine wrote a play called Bajazet, which was based on the life of the Şehzade who was preferred on the throne over the existing sultan his brother Murad IV.
- Şehzade Bayezid is portrayed by Yiğit Uçan in the 2015 Turkish TV series Muhteşem Yüzyıl: Kösem. In the series, he is the son of a fictional concubine named Gülbahar Sultan, and attempts to assassinate Murad, but fails and is executed.
