= Şehzade Kasım =

Ottoman prince (1614–1638)

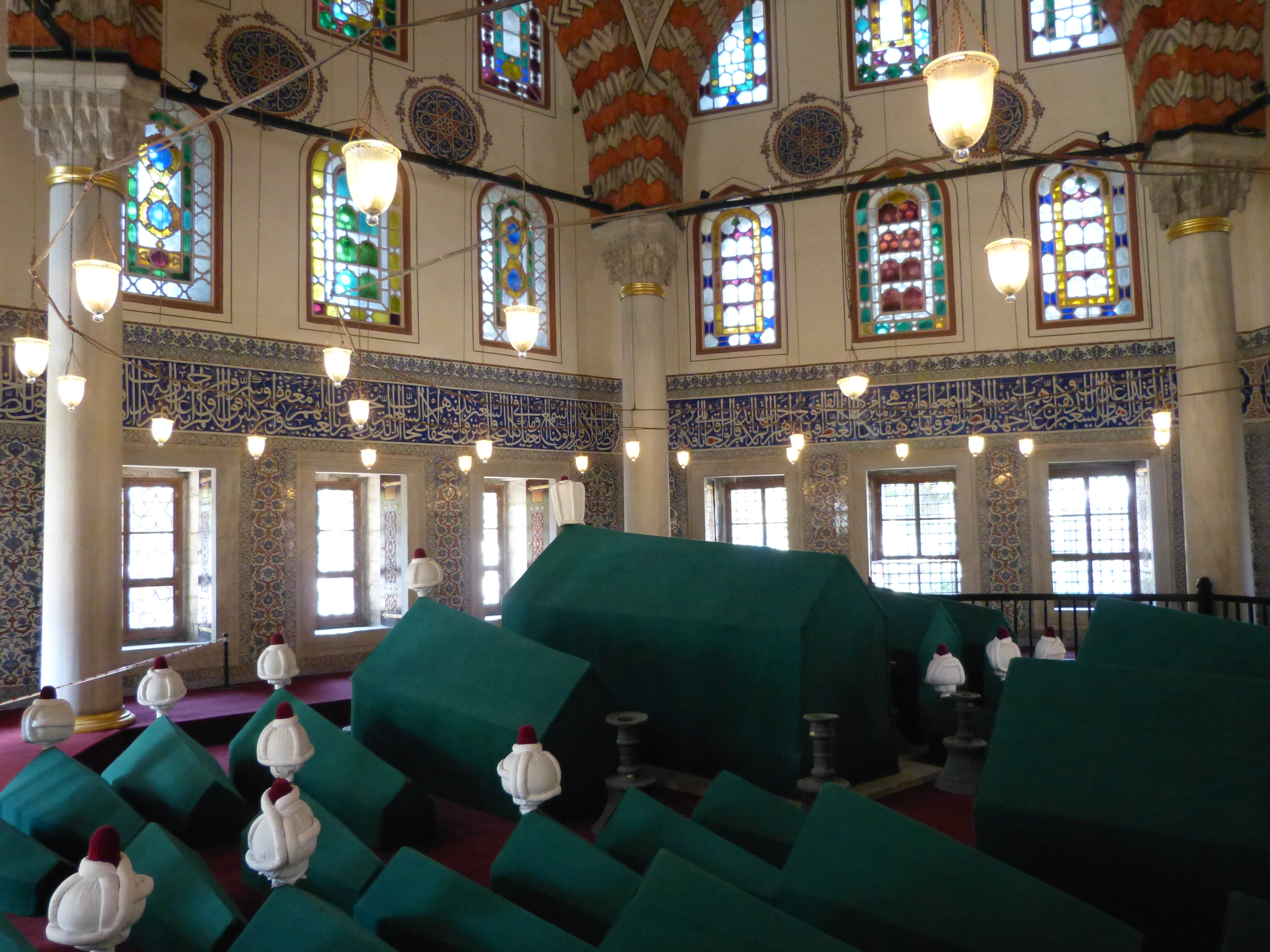
- The tomb of Şehzade Kasım is located inside the Murad III Mausoleum, Hagia Sophia in Istanbul.
- Born: 1614; Topkapı Palace, Constantinople, Ottoman Empire
- Died: 17 February 1638 (aged 23–24); Topkapı Palace, Constantinople, Ottoman Empire
- Burial: Murad III Mausoleum, Hagia Sophia, Constantinople
Names
- Turkish: Şehzade Kasım bin Ahmed I Ottoman Turkish: شہزادہ قاسم
- Dynasty: Ottoman
- Father: Ahmed I
- Mother: Kösem Sultan
- Religion: Sunni Islam

Şehzade Kasım (Ottoman Turkish: شهزاده قاسم; 1614 – 17 February 1638) was an Ottoman prince, son of Sultan Ahmed I and his Haseki Kösem Sultan. He was the half-brother of Osman II, and brother of Murad IV and Ibrahim.

== Life ==
Şehzade Kasım was born in 1614 in Topkapı Palace to Ahmed I and Kösem Sultan. Following his father’s early death in 1617, he, and his mother and brothers were banished to the Old Palace (Eski Sarayı).

After Murad’s accession in 1623, Kasım was confined in the Kafes, which was the part of the Imperial Harem where possible successors to the throne were kept under a form of house-arrest and constant surveillance by the palace eunuchs.

== Efforts to save Ibrahim from execution ==
According to the Turkish historian Necdet Sakaoğlu, during Murad IV’s chaotic reign, Kasım hid and protected his younger brother, Ibrahim, in secret parts of the palace by portraying him as innocent and incompetent.

== Death ==
During the celebrations of the Ottoman victory at Erivan in 1635, his brothers Bayezid, Selim and Süleyman were executed, leaving Kasım as the heir apparent to the Ottoman throne.

On 17 February 1638, Kasım was terrified of arousing any suspicion that he had designs on the throne. Thus he was all humility when he presented himself before Murad to pay his respects and wish him success in his expedition to reconquer Baghdad. Murad accepted Kasım’s wishes, and on that same day ordered his execution.

He was buried in Murad III's türbe, in the Hagia Sofia mosque.

The execution of Kasim was the last case of fratricide in the Ottoman dynasty, after which the Law of Fratricide fell into disuse and was definitively replaced by agnatic seniority as a law of succession.

== In popular culture ==
In the television series Muhteşem Yüzyıl: Kösem, Kasım is played by Turkish actor Doğaç Yıldız.
