= Gevherhan Sultan (daughter of Ahmed I) =

Ottoman princess, daughter of Ahmed I

- Born: c. 1605/1606 or 1608; Topkapi Palace, Constantinople, Ottoman Empire (present day Istanbul, Turkey)
- Died: 18 April 1631 (aged 23–26); Constantinople, Ottoman Empire (present day Istanbul, Turkey)
- Burial: Sultan Ahmed Mosque, Istanbul
- Spouse: Öküz Mehmed Pasha (m. 1612; died 1621) Topal Recep Pasha (m. 1622)
- Issue: First marriage Sultanzade Fülan Bey; Second marriage Safiye Hanımsultan
- Dynasty: Ottoman
- Father: Ahmed I
- Mother: Mahfiruz Hatun or Kösem Sultan
- Religion: Sunni Islam

Gevherhan Sultan (Ottoman Turkish: کوھرخان سلطان; c. 1605/1606 or 1608 – 18 April 1631) was an Ottoman princess, daughter of Sultan Ahmed I (r. 1603–1617).

== Birth ==
Gevherhan was born in Constantinople between 1605 and 1608. Her father, Sultan Ahmed I named her in honor of his great aunt Gevherhan Sultan, who had introduced his mother Handan Sultan to his father Mehmed III.

The identity of her mother is uncertain, but she is thought to be either Hatice Mahfiruz Sultan or Kösem Sultan.

== First marriage ==
In the summer of 1612, Gevherhan was married, as arranged by Ahmed, to Öküz Kara Mehmed Pasha, who served as the governor of Egypt from 1607 to 1611, and Grand Admiral of the Ottoman fleet in 1611. The wedding took place at the Old Palace, and the couple were given the Palace of Ibrahim Pasha as their residence. Over a seven-month period, the expenses for providing bread, rice, and lamb to wedding guests and the capital's residents amounted to nearly 2,000,000 aspers. Additionally, during the festivities, an unidentified French observer in Istanbul witnessed Gevherhan's opulent dowry, featuring a solid gold bride-crown, a large chest filled with precious stones and jewels, and numerous rolls of silk. Mehmed served as Grand Vizier from 1614 until 1616 under Ahmed, and then again for a few months in 1619 under Osman II. After being dismissed from the office a second time, he died in Aleppo around 1621. With him, Gevherhan had a son.

== Second marriage ==
In 1622, during Osman II's reign, Gevherhan married Topal Recep Pasha, who in 1632 served as Grand Vizier under her brother Murad IV and was executed the same year. With Recep Pasha, she had a daughter.

== Death ==
Gevherhan Sultan passed away on 18 April 1631 based on Philippe de Harlay's dispatch letter sent on 19 April 1631. She was Buried in Sultan Ahmed Mosque.

"Sir, having received from the Lord Baylle of Venice that he would not be leaving Condne until tomorrow evening, I will tell you the Sultana whom the Caymacam had married died yesterday, which makes me believe that his favor will end very soon, for the other sisters of the grand seigneur will have no rest until one of their husbands takes the place of this one who was sustained only by his wife." (Note: "Monsieur, ayant feu du Sgr. Baylle de Venise qu'il ne feroit partir Condne qui demain au soir, le vous diray comme la Sultane qu'avoit espouzé le Caymacam mourut hier, ce quy fait croyne qui sa faveur fingire bien tost, car les aultres sœurs du grand sgr náuront foint de repos quy quelqu'un de leurs maris ne prenne la place de celuy que ne sustaitoit que par sa femme.")

== Issue ==
Gevherhan had a son by her first marriage:

- Sultanzade Fülan Bey (born 1621/1622). He died in infancy. His name is unknown.

Gevherhan had a daughter by her second marriage:

- Safiye Hanımsultan (January 1630 – c. 1682). She married the future Grand Vizier Abaza Siyavuş Pasha.

== In popular culture ==
- In the 2015 TV series Muhteşem Yüzyıl: Kösem, Gevherhan is portrayed by Turkish actresses Çağla Naz Kargı and Asli Tandoğan as a child and adult respectively.

== See also ==
- List of Ottoman princesses

== Sources ==
- Borekçi, Günhan (2010). Factions And Favorites At The Courts Of Sultan Ahmed I (r. 1603-17) And His Immediate Predecessors.
- Dumas, Juliette (2013). Les perles de nacre du sultanat: Les princesses ottomanes (mi-XVe – mi-XVIIIe siècle).
- Peirce, Leslie P. (1993). The Imperial Harem: Women and Sovereignty in the Ottoman Empire. Oxford University Press. ISBN 978-0-195-08677-5.
- Tezcan, Baki (November 2001). Searching for Osman: A reassessment of the deposition of the Ottoman Sultan Osman II (1618-1622) (PhD Thesis). Princeton University.
