= Topal Recep Pasha =

Grand Vizier of the Ottoman Empire (1632)

Grand Vizier of the Ottoman Empire
- In office 10 February 1632 – 18 May 1632
- Monarch: Murad IV
- Preceded by: Hafız Ahmed Pasha
- Succeeded by: Tabanıyassi Mehmed Pasha

Personal details
- Born: Sanjak of Bosnia
- Died: 18 May 1632 Constantinople, Ottoman Empire
- Spouse: Gevherhan Sultan (m. 1622; died 1631)
- Children: Safiye Hanımsultan

Topal Recep Pasha (Serbo-Croatian: Topal Redžep-paša, "Redjep Pasha "Lame"; died 18 May 1632) was an Ottoman statesman from the Sanjak of Bosnia, as well as Damat ("bridegroom") to the House of Osman as the husband of Gevherhan Sultan, daughter of Sultan Ahmed I. He was the Grand Vizier of the Ottoman Empire from 10 February 1632 until his execution on 18 May 1632. He was instrumental in the lynching the former grand vizier, Hafız Ahmed Pasha. When his brother-in-law Sultan Murad IV realized this, he had Recep Pasha executed on 18 May 1632 in Constantinople. He was of Bosnian origin.

Political offices
| Preceded by Filibeli Hafız Ahmed Pasha | Grand Vizier of the Ottoman Empire; 10 February 1632 – 18 May 1632 | Succeeded by Tabanıyassı Mehmed Pasha |
