= Muhteşem Yüzyıl: Kösem =

Turkish historical fiction television series

- Also known as: The Magnificent Century: Kösem
- Written by: Yılmaz Şahin; Özen Yula; Nükhet Bıçakçı; Sevgi Yılmaz
- Directed by: Çağatay Tosun; Mert Baykal; Yağız Alp Akaydın; Zeynep Günay Tan; Deniz Koloş
- Starring: Nurgül Yeşilçay; Beren Saat; Anastasia Tsilimpiou; Ekin Koç; Tülin Özen; Aslıhan Gürbüz; Hülya Avşar; Vildan Atasever; Hande Doğandemir; Caner Cindoruk; Metin Akdülger; Farah Zeynep Abdullah; Leyla Feray; Berk Cankat; Sibel Taşçıoğlu; Boran Kuzum; Burak Dakak; Öykü Karayel
- Composer: Aytekin Ataş
- Country of origin: Turkey
- Original language: Turkish
- No. of seasons: 2
- No. of episodes: 60

Production
- Producer: Timur Savci
- Running time: 119–167 minutes
- Production company: Tims Productions

Original release
- Network: Star TV (2015–2016); Fox
- Release: 12 November 2015 – 27 June 2017

Related
- Muhteşem Yüzyıl

Muhteşem Yüzyıl: Kösem (Turkish pronunciation: [muhteˈʃæm ˈjyzjɯl cøˈsæm], lit. 'Magnificent Century: Kösem') is a Turkish television sequel to the 2011 Turkish television period drama, Muhteşem Yüzyıl. Written by Yılmaz Şahin, it recounts the life of Mahpeyker Kösem Sultan, one of the most powerful women in Ottoman history who was part of the Sultanate of Women. Actresses Nurgül Yeşilçay, Beren Saat and Anastasia Tsilimpiou played the title role in three different ages of her life, while actors Ekin Koç, Boran Kuzum, Taner Ölmez, Metin Akdülger and Tugay Mercan were cast as different sultans of the Ottoman dynasty. Also in the starring cast were actresses Hülya Avşar, Tülin Özen, Leyla Feray, Farah Zeynep Abdullah, Aslıhan Gürbüz and Hande Doğandemir, who played prominent roles of different sultanas in the series.

The first few episodes of the series were filmed in Chios, Greece. An excerpt of the show was screened in Cannes, France, at the annual international television festival MIPCOM about a month before its official premiere on Star TV on November 12, 2015. It was later transferred to FOX for its second season. Since its broadcast, Muhteşem Yüzyıl: Kösem has been aired in several countries.

Its final episode aired on 27 June 2017. The series' finale marked the end of the six-year Muhteşem Yüzyıl saga.

== Synopsis ==
The series follows the life of Kösem Sultan, the most powerful and influential woman in the Ottoman Empire. It chronicles her journey from being brought as a slave into the Imperial harem of Ahmed I, through her rise to power and influence as Haseki Sultan, to becoming a formidable ruler who dominated the Ottoman Empire as Valide Sultan and Naib i Sultanat during the reigns of her sons Murad IV and Ibrahim, and her grandson Mehmed IV.

=== Season 1 ===
The first season chronicles the transition of the Ottoman throne to the young Sultan Ahmed I and the subsequent arrival of Anastasia to the Topkapı Palace harem. Initially a reluctant captive gifted by Ahmed’s grandmother, Safiye Sultan, Anastasia gradually falls in love with the Sultan. Following her conversion to Islam, she takes the name Mahpeyker, and eventually Kösem ("the leader"). The central conflict of the early season revolves around the political machinations of the veteran Safiye Sultan, who seeks to retain her grip on power against the newly appointed Valide Sultan, Handan, and Ahmed's step mother, Halime Sultan . Kösem secures her position by successfully defending Ahmed during political crises, a smallpox epidemic, and multiple assassination attempts. She eventually banishes Safiye Sultan to the Old Palace, consolidating her own authority within the harem. The latter half of the season highlights the brutal realities of the Ottoman law of fratricide. In the show , Ahmed breaks traditional protocol by sparing his psychologically unstable brother, Mustafa, a decision that creates ongoing political vulnerability.The dynamic changes permanently during a violent palace coup orchestrated by Safiye Sultan, who attempts to enthrone the young Şehzade Mustafa. During the chaotic siege of the Topkapı Palace, rebel forces storm the harem. In the ensuing violence, Mahfiruze Hatun(the first consort of Ahmed I) is tragically killed while trying to shield her infant son, Osman(later Sultan Osman II).Following Mahfiruze's death, Kösem takes the orphaned Prince Osman under her wing. She raises him alongside her own biological children, forming a deep maternal bond with the future Sultan. With Mahfiruze gone, Handan Sultan deceased, and Safiye Sultan eventually neutralized and banished to the Old Palace, Kösem consolidates absolute authority over the harem as Ahmed's undisputed favourite and chief consort (Haseki Sultan). Years later,Following Sultan Ahmed's untimely death from illness, Kösem makes a historic political maneuver: she alters the succession laws to introduce seniority (ekberiyet), allowing Ahmed's mentally unstable brother, Mustafa I , to ascend the throne to protect all the young princes from execution.Mustafa's mental instability renders him unfit to rule, leading to a series of swift enthronements and depositions orchestrated by factional palace alliances. Ahmed’s eldest son, Osman II, eventually takes the throne. Despite his initial closeness to Kösem, political manipulation drives a wedge between them, leading Osman to banish her and execute her eldest son, Şehzade Mehmed (Kosem's firstborn biological son). Osman’s subsequent attempts to reform the military trigger a violent Janissary revolt. The season concludes with the brutal deposition and regicide of Sultan Osman II by Halime Sultan's faction, followed by a counter-coup led by Kösem that eliminates her rivals and establishes her as the official Naibe-i Saltanat (Regent) for her young son, Murad IV.

=== Season 2 ===
The second season begins after a significant time-skip, focusing on the mature reign of Sultan Murad IV and his fierce struggle to reclaim absolute authority from his mother. Having ruled as Regent for over a decade during Murad's minority, Kösem Sultan has become deeply entrenched in state bureaucracy and refuses to relinquish political control.

Murad IV emerges as a strict, iron-fisted ruler determined to curb corruption, suppress internal rebellions, and defeat the Safavid Empire. He strips his mother of her official regency and bans alcohol, tobacco, and coffee assemblies across the empire to prevent political sedition. This creates a bitter ideological rift: Kösem prioritizes the preservation of the dynasty through palace diplomacy and protecting her remaining sons (Ibrahim and Kasım) while Murad prioritizes absolute state authority and military dominance, executing any who challenge his word. The internal family warfare reaches a tragic peak when Murad orders the execution of his brother, Şehzade Kasım, devastating Kösem. He also executes Şehzade Bayezid (the step son of Kosem Sultan) and son of Gülbahar Sultan (a fictional consort of Ahmed I loosely inspired from Mahfiruze Hatun). Kösem tries to remove Murad from throne hence he On his deathbed, a desperate Murad commands the execution of Ibrahim to end the imperial line, intending to pass the throne to the Khan of Crimea. Kösem successfully hides Ibrahim and stops the execution squad by the help of Kemankeş Kara Mustafa Pasha. Murad succumbs to his illness and dies.

Following the death of Murad IV, his only surviving brother, Ibrahim ascends the throne. Having spent his youth confined in the Kafes (the restricted palace quarters) under constant fear of execution, Ibrahim is psychologically fragile and deeply unstable. Kösem Sultan steps in once again as the de facto ruler, assuming the role of Valide Sultan to manage the crumbling state affairs.

Initially, Kösem encourages Ibrahim's distractions with his harem and eccentric obsessions to keep his focus away from state administration. However, Ibrahim’s erratic behavior rapidly escalates. His rule is marked by severe economic mismanagement, heavy taxation, and the growing influence of his concubines and corrupt palace favorites, who begin to sideline Kösem.widespread public unrest, Kösem realizes Ibrahim is a threat to the survival of the Ottoman dynasty. In 1648, after Ibrahim banishes his mother from the palace, Kösem forms a strategic alliance with the Grand Vizier and the Janissary leadership. She gives her official consent to a palace coup, resulting in Ibrahim being deposed, imprisoned, and subsequently strangled to death. In 1648, Mehmed IV Ibrahim's 6-year-old son ascends the throne.While the title of Valide Sultan naturally belongs to the young Sultan's biological mother, Turhan Sultan, Kösem uses her massive political influence to bypass protocol. She secures a unique appointment as Valide Sultan (grandmother of Sultan) and official Regent, retaining control over the imperial council.The definitive climax of the series centers on a desperate political conspiracy. Recognizing that Turhan Hatun's growing authority threatens her position, Kösem plots a counter-coup to eliminate her rival. She plans to poison the young Sultan Mehmed IV and replace him with his younger half-brother, Şehzade Süleyman, whose mother, Saliha Dilaşub Sultan is politically weak and easily controlled.

The death of Kösem Sultan is depicted as a violent and symbolic conclusion to her decades-long dominance over the Ottoman state. During a midnight palace coup orchestrated by Turhan Hatun, Kösem is cornered in the harem corridors and takes refuge in a secret wall cabinet, where she is eventually discovered and dragged out by her assassins. Before these final moments, she experiences a hallucination of her younger self, Anastasia, who reminds her that she has become the cold, ruthless figure she once swore to never become. The veteran Sultana is subsequently pinned to the floor and strangled with a curtain cord by the conspirators led by Süleyman Ağa. Her passing marks the definitive end of the "Sultanate of Women", as the regency officially passes to Turhan Hatun amidst the silence of the Topkapı Palace.

== Series overview ==
Season	Timeslot	Season premiere	Season finale	No. of episodes	Section range	TV channel
1	20:00	12 November 2015	9 June 2016	30	1–30	Star TV
2	20:00; 23:00	18 November 2016	27 June 2017	30	31–60	Fox

== Characters ==
=== The Imperial Family ===
Actor name	Character name	Description	Episodes	Character status
Nurgül Yeşilçay	Mahpeyker Kösem Sultan	Haseki Sultan of Sultan Ahmed, mother to many of his children. In the series, she also becomes Ahmed's wife. Regent to Murad IV and Mehmed IV, and Valide Sultan to Murad and Ibrahim	31-60	Major
Beren Saat	Mahpeyker Kösem Sultan	Haseki Sultan of Sultan Ahmed, mother to many of his children. In the series, she also becomes Ahmed's wife. Regent to Murad IV and Mehmed IV, and Valide Sultan to Murad and Ibrahim	7-30	Major
Anastasia Tsilimpiou	Mahpeyker Kösem Sultan	Haseki Sultan of Sultan Ahmed, mother to many of his children. In the series, she also becomes Ahmed's wife. Regent to Murad IV and Mehmed IV, and Valide Sultan to Murad and Ibrahim	1-6, 60	Major
Hülya Avşar	Safiye Sultan	Ahmed's grandmother, Sultan Murad III's widow, Valide Sultan and mother of Sultan Mehmed III	1-29	Major
Ekin Koç	Sultan Ahmed I	The 14th Sultan of the Ottoman Empire, son of Sultan Mehmed III and Handan Sultan	1-26	Major
Tülin Özen	Handan Sultan	Valide Sultan and mother of Sultan Ahmed, Sultan Mehmed III's widow	1-19	Major
Aslıhan Gürbüz	Halime Sultan	Sultan Mehmed III's widow, mother of Şehzade Mahmud, Dilruba Sultan and Sultan Mustafa I, Valide Sultan	1-30	Major
Berk Cankat	İskender/Şehzade Yahya	The adopted son of an Austrian blacksmith and a trainee at the Janissary cadet school, Sultan Murad III and Safiye Sultan's son, Ahmed's uncle, in love with Kösem	1-28	Major
Vildan Atasever	Hümaşah Sultan	Safiye Sultan and Sultan Murad III's eldest daughter, Ahmed's aunt, Hasan Pasha's and later Zülfikar Pasha's widow	17-30	Major
Gülcan Arslan	Fahriye Sultan	Safiye Sultan and Sultan Murad III's daughter, Ahmed's aunt, in love with Mehmed Giray, later Dervish Pasha's wife	1-14	Major
Melisa Ilayda Özcanik	Dilruba Sultan	Only daughter of Sultan Mehmed III and Halime Sultan, sister of Sultan Ahmed and Sultan Mustafa, wife of Kara Davud Pasha	1-26	Supporting
Öykü Karayel	Dilruba Sultan	Only daughter of Sultan Mehmed III and Halime Sultan, sister of Sultan Ahmed and Sultan Mustafa, wife of Kara Davud Pasha	20-30	Major
Cüneyt Uzunlar	Sultan Mustafa I	The 15th Sultan of the Ottoman Empire, son of Sultan Mehmed III and Halime Sultan	43, 53, 55-56	Guest Appearance
Boran Kuzum	Sultan Mustafa I	The 15th Sultan of the Ottoman Empire, son of Sultan Mehmed III and Halime Sultan	19-30	Major
Alihan Türkdemir	Sultan Mustafa I	The 15th Sultan of the Ottoman Empire, son of Sultan Mehmed III and Halime Sultan	1-20	Supporting
Taner Ölmez	Sultan Osman II	The 16th Sultan of the Ottoman Empire, son of Sultan Ahmed and Mahfiruze Sultan, adopted by Kösem	20-30	Major
Taner Ölmez	Sultan Osman II	The 16th Sultan of the Ottoman Empire, son of Sultan Ahmed and Mahfiruze Sultan, adopted by Kösem	47	Guest appearance
Burak Dakak	Şehzade Mehmed	Sultan Ahmed and Kösem Sultan's firstborn son	21-28	Major
Dilara Aksüyek	Mahfiruze Sultan	Sultan Ahmed's concubine, mother of Sultan Osman II	5-15	Supporting
Beste Kökdemir	Meleksima Sultan	Favourite consort of Sultan Osman II and mother of Şehzade Ömer	22-30	Supporting
Bahar Selvi	Akile Hanım	Legal wife of Sultan Osman II, mother of Zeynep Sultan and Şehzade Mustafa	28-30	Supporting
Sude Zulal Güler	Ayşe Sultan	Sultan Ahmed and Kösem Sultan's firstborn daughter, Nasuh Pasha's widow	21-30	Supporting
Balim Gayebayrak	Fatma Sultan	Sultan Ahmed and Kösem Sultan's secondborn daughter	21-30	Supporting
Çağan Efe Ak	Sultan Murad IV	The 17th Sultan of the Ottoman Empire, Sultan Ahmed and Kösem Sultan's secondborn son	21-30, 50, 56	Supporting
Metin Akdülger	Sultan Murad IV	The 17th Sultan of the Ottoman Empire, Sultan Ahmed and Kösem Sultan's secondborn son	31-57	Major
Boran Bağcı	Sultan Murad IV	The 17th Sultan of the Ottoman Empire, Sultan Ahmed and Kösem Sultan's secondborn son	56	Guest appearance
Farah Zeynep Abdullah	Farya Sultan	Sultan Murad IV's legal wife, mother of Şehzade Selim and Şehzade Süleyman, daughter of Transylvanian Prince Gabriel Bethlen and Catherine of Brandenburg	31-52	Major
Leyla Feray	Ayşe Sultan	Haseki Sultan of Sultan Murad IV, mother of Şehzade Ahmed, Hanzade Sultan and Ismihan Kaya Sultan	31-46	Major
Ayça Kuru	Gülbahar Sultan	Sultan Ahmed's concubine, mother of Şehzade Bayezid	23, 25, 29	Supporting
Sibel Taşçıoğlu	Gülbahar Sultan	Sultan Ahmed's concubine, mother of Şehzade Bayezid	34-52	Major
Berk Pamir	Şehzade Bayezid	Sultan Ahmed's son by Gülbahar Sultan	21-30, 50	Supporting
Yiğit Uçan	Şehzade Bayezid	Sultan Ahmed's son by Gülbahar Sultan	31-51	Major
Eymen Kaan	Şehzade Kasım	Sultan Ahmed and Kösem Sultan's thirdborn son	21-30	Supporting
Doğaç Yıldız	Şehzade Kasım	Sultan Ahmed and Kösem Sultan's thirdborn son	31-54	Major
Çağla Naz Kargı	Gevherhan Sultan	Sultan Ahmed and Kösem Sultan's thirdborn daughter, Topal Recep Pasha's wife/widow, in love with Silahtar Mustafa	21-30	Supporting
Aslı Tandoğan	Gevherhan Sultan	Sultan Ahmed and Kösem Sultan's thirdborn daughter, Topal Recep Pasha's wife/widow, in love with Silahtar Mustafa	31-45	Major
Ece Çeşmioğlu	Atike Sultan	Sultan Ahmed and Kösem Sultan's fourthborn and youngest daughter, twin to Ibrahim, Silahtar Mustafa Pasha's widow	31-60	Major
Rîdvan Aybars Düzey	Sultan Ibrahim	The 18th Sultan of Ottoman Empire, Sultan Ahmed and Kösem Sultan's fourth-born and youngest son, twin to Atike Sultan	31-57	Major
Tugay Mercan	Sultan Ibrahim	The 18th Sultan of Ottoman Empire, Sultan Ahmed and Kösem Sultan's fourth-born and youngest son, twin to Atike Sultan	57-60	Major
Hande Doğandemir	Turhan Sultan	First Haseki Sultan of Sultan Ibrahim, mother of Sultan Mehmed IV and Beyhan Sultan	57-60	Major
Müge Boz	Hümaşah Sultan	Eighth Haseki Sultan and legal wife of Sultan Ibrahim, mother of Șehzade Orhan	57-60	Supporting
Ece Güzel	Dilaşub Sultan	Second Haseki Sultan of Sultan Ibrahim, mother of Şehzade Süleyman	57-60	Guest Appearance
Firuze Gamze Aksu	Muazzez Sultan	Third Haseki Sultan of Sultan Ibrahim, mother of Şehzade Ahmed	57-60	Guest Appearance

=== Statesmen and palace officials ===
Actor name	Character name	Description	Episodes	Character Status
Mete Horozoğlu	Zülfikar Pasha	Commander of the Istanbul Cadet Janissary Corps, later a vizier and Hümaşah Sultan's husband	1-30	Major
Mehmet Kurtuluş	Derviş Mehmed Pasha	Sultan Ahmed's mentor and first bodyguard, later becomes Fahriye Sultan's husband and Grand Vizier	1-19	Major
Mustafa Üstündağ	Kara Davud Pasha	Dilruba Sultan's husband, Grand Vizier during Mustafa I's reign	21-30	Major
Şahin Sekman	Lala Ömer Efendi	Sultan Osman II's tutor, later Cennet Hatun's husband	19-28	Major
Cihan Ünal	Kuyucu Murad Pasha	One of the viziers of Ahmed I, becomes the Grand Vizier after the execution of Derviş Mehmed Pasha	9-26	Supporting
Tolga Tuncer	Nasuh Pasha	Safiye and then Kösem's chief allegiant, later Ayşe Sultan's husband and Grand Vizier	1-26	Supporting
Şener Savaş	Halil Pasha	Two time Grand Vizier, in service of Kösem Sultan	21-57	Supporting
Engin Benli	Sinan Pasha	One of Sultan Murad IV's viziers, head of Istanbul's Jesuit order after Father Cornelius, in love with Gülbahar	31-57	Major
İsmail Demirci	Kemankeş Mustafa Pasha	Commander of the Janissary Corps and later Admiral of the Fleet and Grand Vizier, in love with Kösem	31-60	Major
Caner Cindoruk	Silahtar Mustafa Pasha	Sultan Murad IV's bodyguard and companion, in love with Gevherhan Sultan, later Atike Sultan's husband and second-in-command vizier after the execution of Abaza Mehmed Pasha, then the Grand Vizier	31-51, 56	Major
Metin Belgin	Ahizade Hüseyin Efendi	Şeyhülislam efendi (supreme religious leader)	31-44	Major
Çağrı Şensoy	Deli Hüseyin Pasha	Former palace halberdier and an allegiant of Sultan Murad and later Kösem Sultan, Admiral of the fleet and third-in-command Vizier	33-60	Major
Eser Karabil	Emirgüne/ Yusuf Pasha	A former Safavid Persian prince, Sultan Murad's confidant and companion after Silahtar Mustafa's death	49-57	Major
Emre Başer	Köprülü Mehmed Pasha	One of the viziers of Sultan Ibrahim and Sultan Mehmed, an allegiant of Turhan Sultan	35-37, 57-60	Major
Ali Düşenkalkar	Cinci Hüseyin Efendi	Sultan Ibrahim's healer and confidant	57-60	Major
Şemsi İnkaya	Zekeriyazade Yahya Efendi	Ahizade's predecessor and successor-in-office and a confidant of Sultan Murad	31-57	Supporting
İsmail Filiz	Abaza Mehmed Pasha	Governor of Bosnia and later second-in-command Vizier, an allegiant of Kösem Sultan	35-49	Supporting
Asil Büyüközçelik	Ladikli Bayram Pasha	Second-in-command Vizier following Silahtar's death and later the Grand Vizier after Tabanıyassı Mehmed Pasha's demise, an allegiant of Kösem Sultan	31-37, 52, 55	Supporting
Cengiz Okuyucu	Tabanıyassı Mehmed Pasha	Grand Vizier after the execution of Topal Recep Pasha and an allegiant of Kösem Sultan	31-37	Supporting

=== Palace servants and concubines ===
Actor name	Character name	Description	Character status
Hakan Şahin	Hacı Mustafa Ağa	Chief eunuch of the harem after Reyhan Ağa and Handan Sultan's servant who serves Kösem Sultan after Handan's death	Major
Esra Dermancıoğlu	Cennet Hatun	Safiye Sultan and then Kösem Sultan's servant, chief treasurer of the harem	Major
Nadir Sarıbacak	Bülbül Ağa	Safiye Sultan's servant	Major
Ebru Ünlü	Eycan Hatun	Kösem Sultan's servant	Supporting
Eylem Yıldız	Menekşe Hatun	Halime Sultan's servant, chief treasurer of the harem	Supporting
Sasha Perera	Gölge Hatun	Kösem Sultan's confidant and guardian	Supporting
Emre Erçil	Reyhan Ağa	Chief eunuch of the harem and an allegiant of Şahin Giray	Supporting
Nurinisa Yıldırım	Dudu Hatun	Chief treasurer of the harem, served Handan Sultan	Supporting
Ahsen Eroğlu	Meleki Hatun	Kösem Sultan's servant, chief treasurer of the harem	Supporting
Ahsen Eroğlu	Meleki Hatun	Kösem Sultan's servant, chief treasurer of the harem	Supporting
Gizem Emre	Yasemin Hatun	Sultan Ahmed's concubine and Safiye Sultan's allegiant, Kösem Sultan's sister	Supporting
İhsan Önal	Süleyman Ağa	Safiye Sultan's servant, serves in the palace during Osman's reign	Supporting
Burcu Gül Kazbek	Melek Hatun/ Madame Marguerite	Farya's governess and servant, after her death Atike Sultan's servant and later chief treasurer of the harem	Major
Sezgi Sena Akay	Sanavber Hatun	Sultan Murad's concubine, a Safavid spy and an ally of Sinan Pasha	Supporting
İdil Yener	Lalezar Hatun	Kösem Sultan's servant, chief treasurer of the harem	Supporting
Șeyma Burcu Gül	Supporting		
Gümeç Alpay Aslan	Şivekar Hatun	Sultan Ibrahim's concubine	Supporting
Gizem Kala	Zarife Hatun	Sultan Ibrahim's concubine, mother of his eldest son Osman	Supporting
Fırat Topkorur	Süleyman Ağa	Turhan Sultan's servant	Supporting
Berk Ali Çatal	Musa Çelebi	Childhood friend of Murad IV whom Kosem Sultan sent to distract her son from state affairs. She has him assassinated due to him confessing everything to Murad.	Guest Appearance

=== Otherwise associated to the palace ===
Actor name	Role name	Description	Character status
Erkan Kolçak Köstendil	Şahin Giray	A Crimean lord, Mehmed Giray's brother	Major
Kadir Doğulu	Mehmed III Giray	A Crimean lord, Şahin Giray's brother, later the Crimean Khan, in love with Fahriye Sultan	Major
Ahmet Varlı	Pinhan Ağa	Şehzade Mustafa's imaginary confidant	Supporting
Muhammed Uzuner	Aziz Mahmud Hüdayi	One of the most famous sufi ermiş (Muslim saint) of the Ottoman Empire	Supporting
Ozan Ağaç	Cebecibaşı Mansur Ağa	A Janissary leader and one of the key people in dethroning Osman II, an ally of Davud Pasha	Supporting
Cenk Suyabatmaz	Kilindir Uğrusu	One of the Janissaries who cooperates with Davud Pasha to dethrone Sultan Osman	Supporting
Ferit Kaya	Kara Seyit	One of the people who lead the Celali rebels during Ahmed I's reign	Supporting
Alma Terzic	Esther Hatun	Kösem Sultan's economic agent (kira), in love with Silahtar	Supporting
Necip Memili	Evliya Çelebi	Chronicler and explorer of the time, close friends with Hezarfen, friend of Murad, Silahtar and Kemankeş	Supporting
Ushan Çakır	Hezârfen Ahmed Çelebi	Polymath, inventor and aviator of the time, close friends with Evliya, friend of Murad, Silahtar and Kemankeş	Supporting
Serkan Keskin	Nef'i	Poet and satirist of the time	Supporting
Murat Atik	Father Cornelius	Catholic priest, head of Istanbul's Jesuit order and agent of the Pope	Supporting

== International broadcasts ==
Country	Local title	Network	Premiere date	Timeslot
Afghanistan	Magnificent Century: Kosem	1TV	October 17, 2016 - 2018 (seasons 1–2)	20:00
Albania	Sulltanesha Kosem	TV Klan	October 17, 2017 - June 26, 2018 (season 1); June 27, 2018 - December 2, 2018 (season 2)	21:00
Algeria	السّلطانة قسم as-Sulṭānah Qusum	OSN; Echorouk TV	January 1, 2016 - August 8, 2016 (season 1); January 15, 2017 - August 4, 2017 (season 2) - OSN Ya Hala; May 27, 2017 - 2018 - Echorouk TV (seasons 1–2)	20:00
Arab World (20 countries)	حريم السلطان - السلطانة قُسم; Hareem-el Sultan: El Sultana Qosum	OSN	January 1, 2016 - August 8, 2016 (season 1); January 15, 2017 - August 4, 2017 (season 2)	20:00
Argentina	Kosem, La Sultana	Telefe	2019	TBA
Bangladesh	সুলতান সুলেমানঃ কোসেম; Sultan Suleiman: Kosem	Deepto TV	February 17, 2018 - June 23, 2018 (season 1); June 23, 2018 - November 12, 2018 (season 2)	19:30
Bulgaria	Великолепният век: Кьосем	bTV	June 27, 2017- April 20, 2018 (season 1); April 23, 2018 - July 27, 2018 (season 2)	20:00
Chile	Kosem, La Sultana	Canal 13	January 3, 2017 - April 26, 2017 (season 1); April 27, 2017 - January 1, 2018 (season 2)	22:30
Egypt	السّلطانة قسم as-Sulṭānah Qusum	CBC	November 27, 2016- 2018 (seasons 1–2)	
Estonia	Sajandi valitsejanna	Kanal 2 Kanal 11	September 17, 2016 - July 1, 2017 (season 1); July 2, 2017 - December 30, 2017 (43-66 episodes, season 2) - Kanal 2 January 6, 2018 - May 5, 2018 (67-84 episodes, season 2) - Kanal 11	21:35; 21:35
Georgia	დიდებული საუკუნე: ქოსემის რისხვა Didebuli saukune: Kosemis riskhva	Rustavi 2	September 12, 2016 - February, 2017 (season 1); February, 2017 - August, 2017 (season 2)	19:50
Greece	Κιοσέμ: Η Σουλτάνα	Victory DVD Company	February 3, 2016 (seasons 1–2)	
Hungary	A szultána	TV2, Izaura TV	September 13, 2016 - February 28, 2017 (season 1); March 7, 2017 - January 27, 2018 (season 2, 85-128 episodes) - TV2; November 9, 2018 - January 3, 2019 (season 2, 129-168 episodes) - Izaura TV	22:00
India	Kosem Sultan	Zee Aflam	2017 - 2018 (seasons 1–2)	
Indonesia	Abad Kejayaan 2: Kosem	SCTV	January 1, 2016 - June, 2016 (season 1)	20:00
Iran	ماه‌پیکر; Maah Peikar	OSN; GEM TV	January 1, 2016 - August 8, 2016 (season 1); January 15, 2017 - August 4, 2017 (season 2) - OSN Ya Hala; August 14, 2016 - December 30, 2016 (season 1); January 1, 2017 - August 12, 2017 (season 2)	20:00
Kazakhstan	Ғаламат ғасыр. Көсем дәуірі	7 Channel	October 17, 2016 - February 10, 2017 (season 1)	21:50
Kosovo	Shekulli Madhёshtor: Kosem	RTV21	April 11, 2016 - February 9, 2017 (season 1); February 14, 2017 - November 21, 2017 (season 2)	20:00
Latvia	Lieliskais gadsimts. Kosema	LNT	April 21, 2018 - September 29, 2018 (season 1); September 30, 2018 - March 2, 2019 (Season 2)	21:05
Lebanon	Sultana Kosem	Al Jadeed	Sep 5, 2016 - 2018 (seasons 1–2)	18:50
Lithuania	Didingasis amžius. Jos Didenybė Kiosem	LNK	September 4, 2016 - Juny 24, 2017 (season 1); July 1, 2017 - April 28, 2018 (season 2)	14:25
Mexico	La Sultana Kosem	Imagen Television	February 12, 2018 - May 4, 2018 (season 1); May 7, 2018 - June 15, 2018 (season 2)	21:00
Moldova	Kosem	Canal 2	September 4, 2017 - January 5, 2018 (season 1)	20:00
Mongolia	Косем	Edutainment TV	May 21, 2017 - August, 2017 (season 1); January, 2018 - April 27, 2018 (season 2)	21:00
North Macedonia	Shekulli Madhёshtor: Kosem	TV 21	April 11, 2016 - February 9, 2017 (season 1); February 14, 2017 - November 21, 2017 (season 2)	20:00
Pakistan	کوسم سلطان Kösem Sultan	Urdu 1	Season 1–31 October 2016 - 4 April 2017; Season 2–24 July 2017 - 9 April 2018	Mon-Fri 21:00 PST; Mon-Wed 22:30 PST
Panama	Kosem	TVN Panama	August 19, 2019	
Poland	Wspaniałe stulecie: Sułtanka Kösem	TVP1	April 25, 2016 - September 23, 2016 (season 1); February 14, 2017 - August 24, 2018 (season 2)	15:50 (ep.1-5); 18:40 (ep.6-132); 16:05 (ep.133-168)
Puerto Rico	La Sultana	Telemundo	October 29, 2018	20:00
Romania	Kosem	Kanal D Romania	January 23, 2017 - March 16, 2017 (Season 1); September 25, 2017 - January 19, 2018 (season 2)	20:00
Russia	Великолепный век. Империя Кёсем; Magnificent Century. Empire of Kosem	Domashniy	January 7, 2017 - May 27, 2017 (season 1)	19:00
Tunisia	Sultana Kosem	Nessma TV	September 12, 2016 - 2018 (seasons 1–2)	18:50
Turkey	Muhteşem Yüzyıl: Kösem	Star TV (season 1); FOX (season 2)	November 12, 2015 - June 9, 2016 (season 1); November 18, 2016 - June 27, 2017 (season 2)	20:00
Ukraine	Величне століття. Нова володарка	1+1	September 24, 2018 - November 27, 2018 (season 1); November 27, 2018 - February 1, 2019 (season 2)	17:10
United Arab Emirates	حريم السلطان - السلطانة قُسم; Hareem-el Sultan: El Sultana Qosum	OSN; Dubai One	January 1, 2016 - August 8, 2016 (season 1); January 15, 2017 - August 4, 2017 (season 2) - OSN Ya Hala; September 4, 2016 - January, 2017 (season 1); September, 2017 - April, 2018 (season 2) - Dubai One	20:00
United States	La Sultana	Telemundo	October 29, 2018 - January 18, 2019 (season 1)	20:00
Uruguay	Kosem La Sultana	Monte Carlo TV	March 10, 2017 - August 16, 2017 (season 1)	21:30
Uzbekistan	Ko'sem	Milliy TV	September 4, 2017 - January 5, 2018 (season 1); January 8, 2018 - May 25, 2018 (season 2)	21:00

== See also ==
- List of Islam-related films
- Al-Siyasa al-Shar'iyya fi Islah al-Ra'i wa al-Ra'iyya
