= Mahfiruz Hatun =

Mother of Sultan Osman II

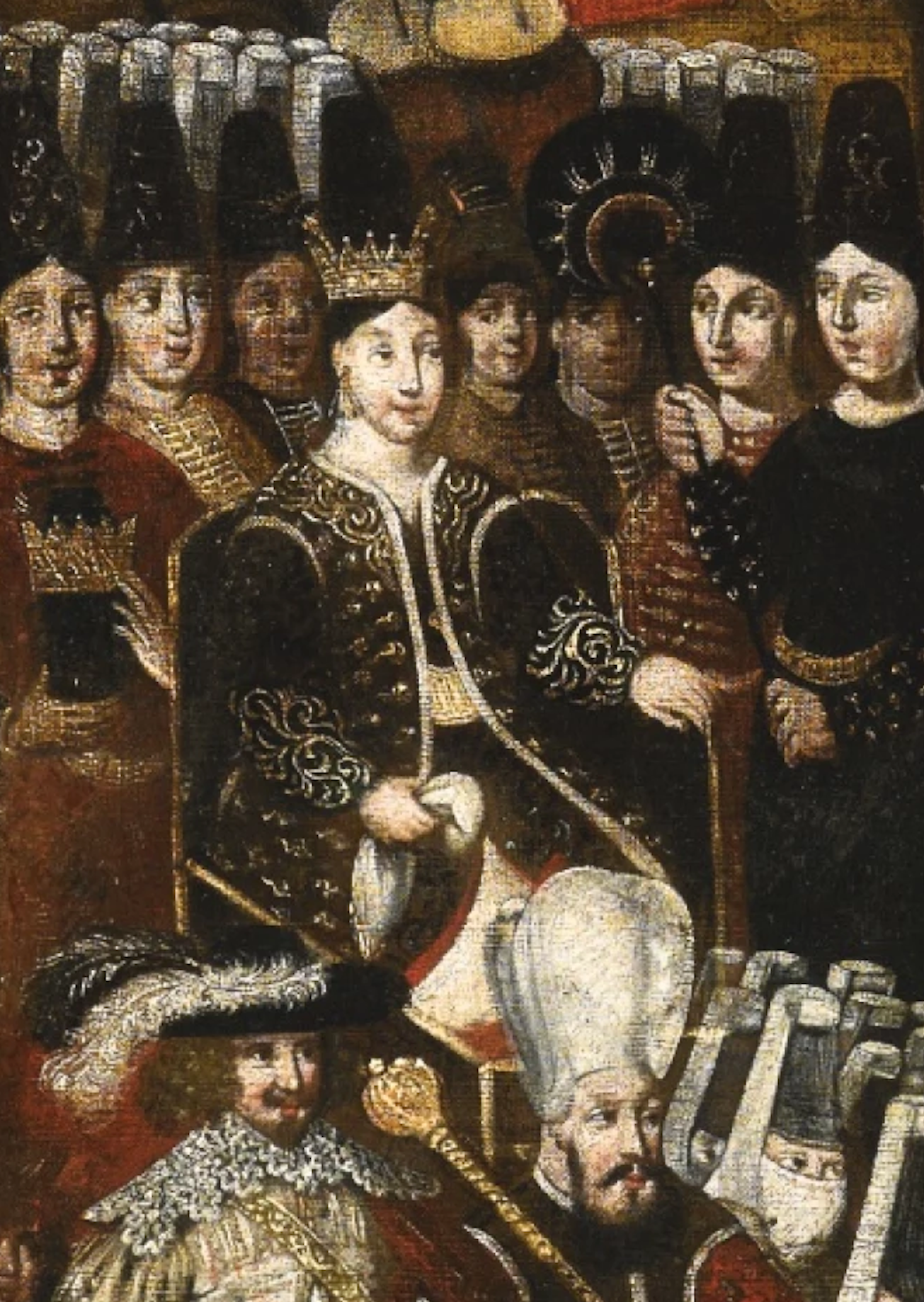
- Detail from a painting depicting the enthronement of Osman II, c. 1618
- Born: c. 1590
- Died: 1608, 1620 or 1628; Constantinople, Ottoman Empire
- Burial: Eyüp Cemetery, Constantinople, Turkey
- Consort of: Ahmed I
- Issue: Osman II; Gevherhan Sultan (?); Şehzade Bayezid; Şehzade Hüseyin; Şehzade Süleyman (?)
Names
- Turkish: Hatice Mahfiruz Hatun; Ottoman Turkish: خدیجه ماه فیروز خاتون
- Religion: Sunni Islam

Hatice Mahfiruz Hatun (Ottoman Turkish: خدیجه ماه فیروز خاتون, "glorious moon", "daytime moon" or "turquoise moon"; also called Mahfiruze; c. 1590 – 1608, 1620 or 1628) was a consort of Ottoman sultan Ahmed I and mother of his firstborn son, Osman II.

== Biography ==
=== Origins ===
Her origins are unknown. Although she has been described as Greek in the past, this hypothesis was eventually disproven by Turkish historian Baki Tezcan as based on the 1743 novel Histoire d'Osman premier du nom, XIXe empereur des turcs, et de l'impératrice Aphendina Ashada by Madeleine-Angélique de Gomez.

=== Name ===
Turkish historian Yılmaz Öztuna calls her "Hadîce Mâh-Fîrûz(e)" and Turkish historian Necdet Sakaoğlu says she was variously called "Mahirûze, Hatice Mahfirûze, Mahfirûze, Mahfirûz, Mah-ı Feyrûz". Her name was first recorded in The Chronicle of Naima (Tārīḫ-i Naʿīmā), written by Ottoman historian Mustafa Naima around 1700, quoting Mahfiruz as a "noble and august" lady.

=== Life in the harem ===
She was presented by Servazad Hatun to Handan Sultan, mother of sultan Ahmed I, who personally chose Mahfiruz for her son.

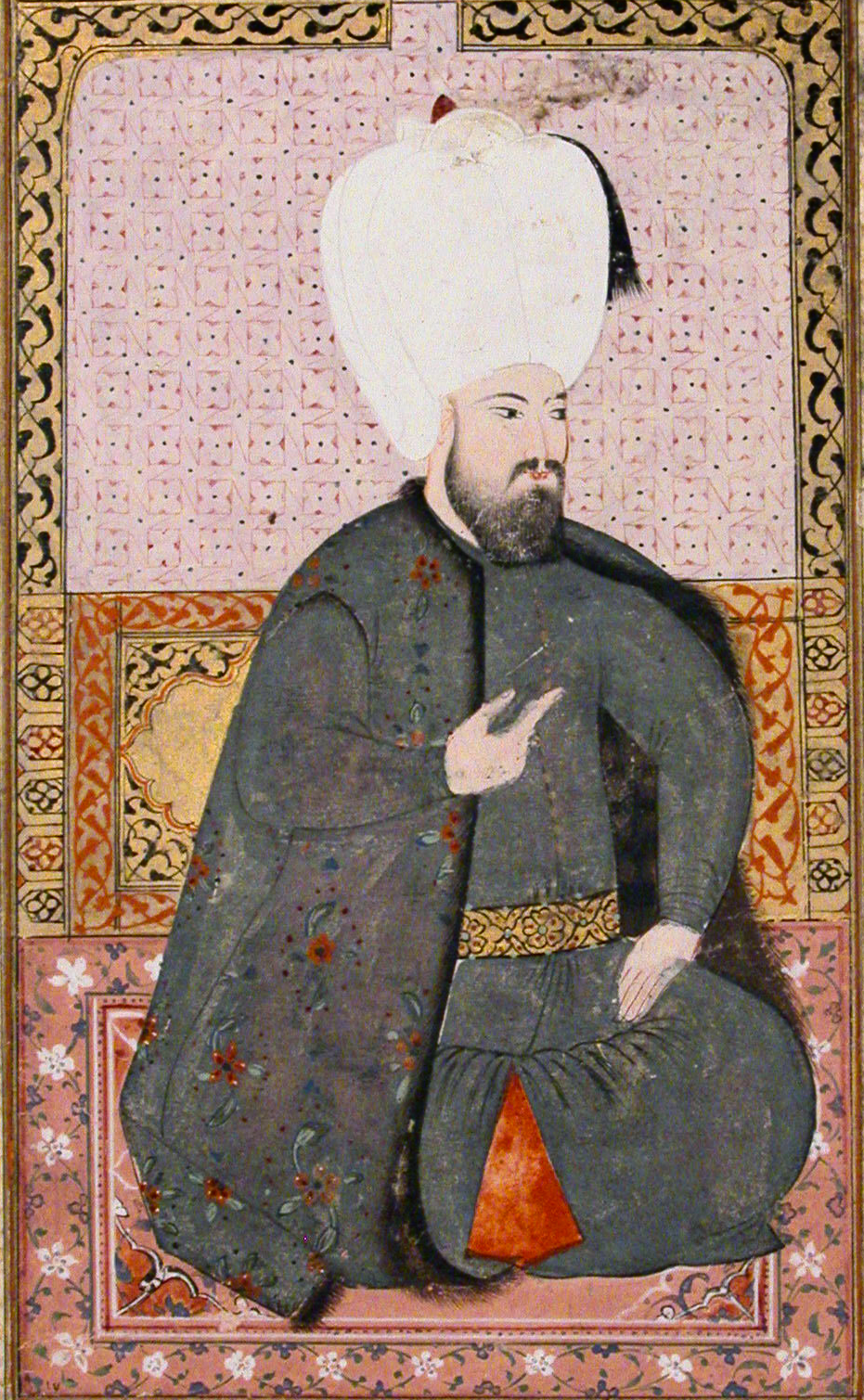
Contemporary portrait of Ahmed I, now in the collection of the Metropolitan Museum of Art

On 3 November 1604, Mahfiruz gave birth to his firstborn son, the future Osman II, making Ahmed I the youngest Ottoman sultan to have fathered a child. According to Ahmet Refik Altınay, in the following years, she bore the sultan other children, including Şehzade Bayezid in 1612, Şehzade Hüseyin in 1613, and perhaps Şehzade Süleyman around 1615, an information reproduced by several authors. Foreign ambassadors also report a daughter who reached adulthood and married, often identified as Gevherhan Sultan, and born between 1605 and 1608. These children may contradict the theory of a premature death.

She has been described as a "sultan" or "haseki sultan", an information also mentioned by French historian and politician Alphonse de Lamartine. At the very least, this suggests that Mahfiruz held an elevated position during Ahmed I's reign.

It has been proposed that as her son acceded to the throne in February 1618, Mahfiruz returned to Topkapı from the Old Palace. She is depicted as participating in Osman II's enthronement procession in a painting titled "The rise of the young Osman", which was later bought at Sotheby's by the Turkish Ministry of Culture in 2016 and since then exhibited at Topkapı Palace. The work was commissioned by Austrian ambassador Hans Mollard von Reinek, who was invited to the ceremony with his entourage.

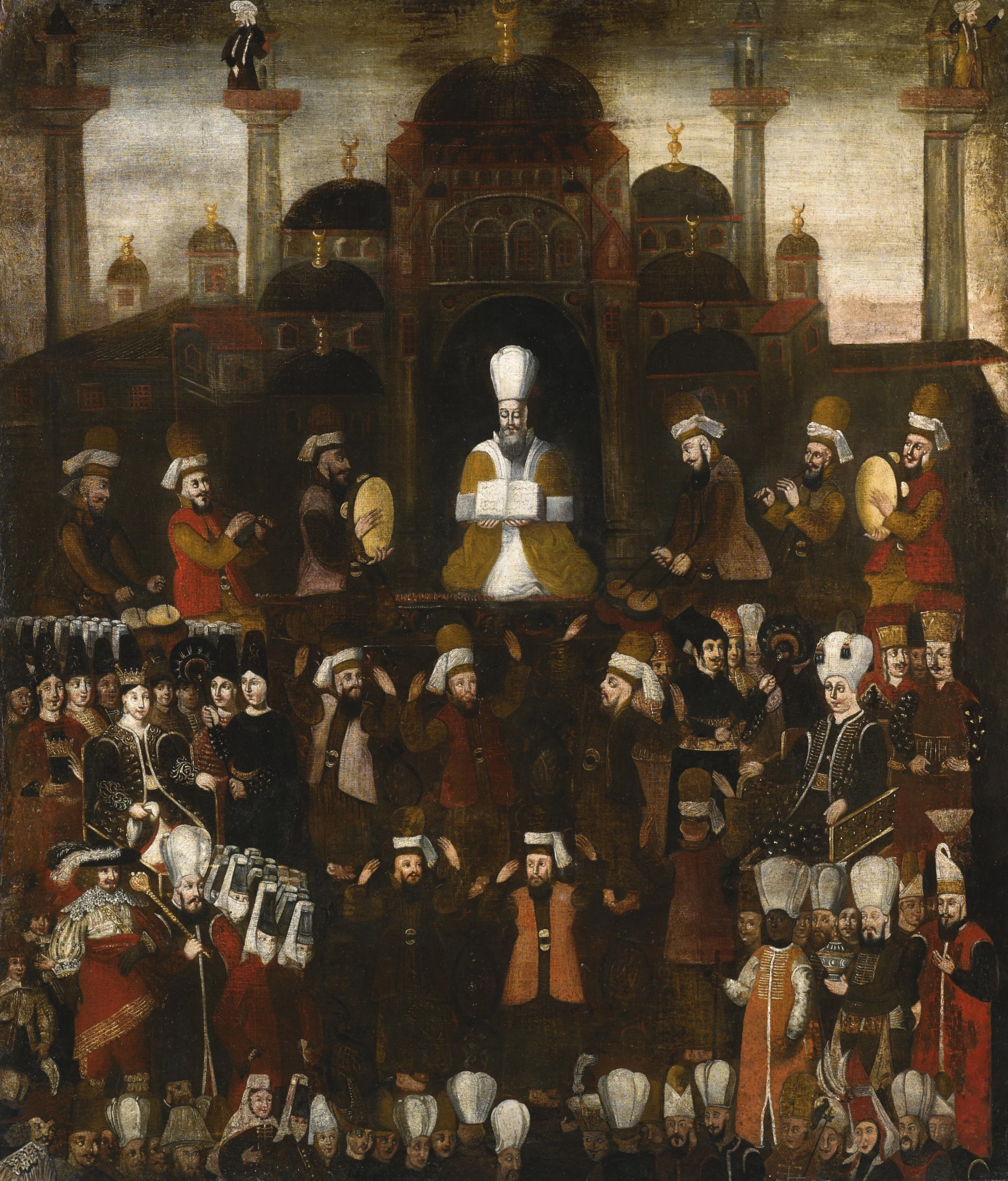
The enthronement of Osman II (r. 1618–1622), by an European artist traveling with the Austrian ambassador

Austrian historian Joseph von Hammer-Purgstall claimed that, provided Mahfiruz was still alive at the time, she and Kösem Sultan shouldn't have been on bad terms during Osman II's reign, as the young sultan visited the Old Palace in April 1619 and stayed for some days on the occasion of celebrations held for him by Kösem.

Mahfiruz is largely remembered in Eyüp because of her charitable work. She ordered the construction of a cüzhane (Quran reading room) in Eyüp Cemetery, which was completed in 1622. She ordered the Quran to be read every day, earning a reputation as a devout muslim woman.

Her other contributions to the city of Eyüp included providing copies of the Quran to her cüzhane and rendering religious services at the tomb of Ahmed I. A devotee of Abu Ayyub al-Ansari, she was nicknamed as "Sâhibe-i Hayrât" because of her charity. Mahfiruz formed a bond with Eyüp and visited it whenever she had the opportunity.

== Death ==
Turkish historian Baki Tezcan states that Mahfiruz died in 1610, if not earlier. His theory is supported by contemporary ambassadorial accounts throughout Ahmed I's reign, extending up to the accession of Osman II in 1618, such as the English ambassador George Sandys, who stated around 1610 that, "this also hath married his concubine, the mother of his yonger sonne (she being dead by whom he had the eldest), who with all the practices of a politicke stepdame endevours to settle the succession on her owne..."; the Venetian ambassador Cristoforo Valier reported between 1612 and 1615 that Ahmed had four sons: "two from the sultana who died and two from the one alive"; Italian author Pietro della Valle also noted that Osman's mother had died when he wrote about Osman II's accession to the throne: "Osman, Sultan Ahmed's firstborn son, but not son of the living sultana Kösem". That Mahfiruz was dead is also recorded in an account on the life and death of Nasuh Pasha, written sometime after Nasuh’s execution in 1614 by the French ambassador Achille de Harlay. He also stated that the new sultan was "not the son of the living sultana but the eldest named Osman, who has been motherless for ten years" in a letter to Louis XIII, which is dated 26 February 1618, the day of Osman's enthronement. Tezcan argues that the document (dated 28 October 1620) cited by Uluçay as evidence for the year of Mahfiruz's death does not in fact suggest that she died that year. Günhan Börekçi quoted Tezcan's theory in his "A Queen-Mother at Work: On Handan Sultan and Her Regency During the Early Reign of Ahmed I".

According to historian Leslie P. Peirce, Mahfiruz did not become valide sultan and instead died in exile by 1620, as evidenced by the absence of a valide sultan in the privy purse records during Osman's reign and the high stipend of the sultan's wet nurse from middle 1620 onwards, an indication that she served as de facto valide sultan.

According to some modern accounts, Mahfiruz lived to become valide sultan, and as such, died on 26 or 28 October 1620. Ottoman historian İbrahim Peçevi also asserted that Mahfiruz lived for two years as valide sultan.

Based on the official website of Eyüp Cemetery, Mahfiruz was sent to the Old Palace upon the accession of Murad IV in 1623 and died in 1628, after spending her last years weeping over the tragic fate of her son.

== Burial ==
Mahfiruz was buried in Eyüp Cemetery, an unusual place for the former consort of a sultan. According to some authors she personally chose her burial site, while others consider this a sign of disfavor. The chronogram on her mausoleum suggests it was built by Osman II in 1618.

== Issue ==
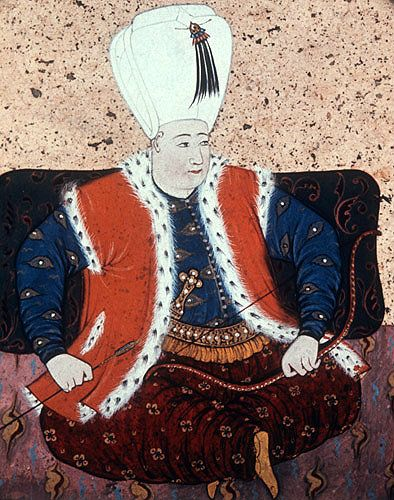
Portrait of Osman II, c. 1710–20

Mahfiruz had at least three sons:

- Osman II (3 November 1604, Topkapı Palace, Constantinople – 20 May 1622, Constantinople; buried in the Ahmed I Mausoleum, Blue Mosque) — his father's firstborn and the 16th sultan of the Ottoman Empire; killed during a janissary revolt, becoming the first Ottoman sultan to be executed.
- Şehzade Bayezid (December 1612, Constantinople – 27 July 1635, Topkapı Palace, Constantinople; buried in the Ahmed I Mausoleum, Blue Mosque) — executed upon the order of his elder half-brother Murad IV.
- Şehzade Hüseyin (November 1613, Constantinople – 1617, Topkapı Palace, Constantinople; buried in the Mehmed III Mausoleum, Hagia Sophia)

She was also possibly the mother of:

- Gevherhan Sultan (c. 1605/1606 or 1608, Constantinople – 18 April 1631, Constantinople; buried in the Ahmed I Mausoleum, Blue Mosque)
- Şehzade Süleyman (1611/1612 or 1615, Topkapı Palace, Constantinople – 27 July 1635, Topkapı Palace, Constantinople; buried in the Ahmed I Mausoleum, Blue Mosque) — executed upon the order of his elder half-brother Murad IV.

== In popular culture ==
- Mahfiruz is one of the characters in the 1743 historical novel "Histoire d'Osman premier du nom, XIXe empereur des turcs, et de l'impératrice Aphendina Ashada" by French authoress Madeleine-Angélique de Gomez.
- Mahfiruz is one of the characters in the 2001 historical novel "La sultana: Giacometta Beccarino da Manfredonia" by Italian essayist Vito Salierno.
- Portrayed by Öykü Çelik in the 2010 film Mahpeyker: Kösem Sultan.
- Portrayed by Dilara Aksüyek in the 2015 TV series Muhteşem Yüzyıl: Kösem.

== See also ==
- List of mothers of the Ottoman sultans
- List of Ottoman imperial consorts

== Annotations ==
1. An earlier theory gave her original name as Evdoksia, but this has also been found to be based on the novel Histoire d'Osman premier du nom, XIXe empereur des turcs, et de l'impératrice Aphendina Ashada by Madeleine-Angélique de Gomez.

== Sources ==
- Peirce, Leslie P. (1993). The Imperial Harem: Women and Sovereignty in the Ottoman Empire. Oxford University Press. pp. 233–. ISBN 978-0-19-508677-5.
- Tezcan, Baki (2007). "The Debut of Kösem Sultan's Political Career". Turcica. 39–40. Éditions Klincksieck.
- Nazım Tektaş (2004). Harem'den taşanlar. Çatı. pp. 183–185. ISBN 978-975-8845-02-6.
- Uluçay, Mustafa Çağatay (2011). Padışahların Kadınları ve Kızları. Ötüken, Ankara. ISBN 978-9-754-37840-5.
