= Anastasia Tsilimpiou =

Greek actress

- Born: Anastasia Eirini Tsilimpiou; 12 November 1997 (age 28); Athens, Greece
- Occupations: Actress, model
- Years active: 2005–present

Anastasia Tsilimpiou (Greek: Αναστασία Τσιλιμπίου; born 12 November 1997) is a Greek-Romanian actress and model. She began her career at the age of five as a child actor and model. She is multilingual and can speak Greek, Romanian, English and Turkish.

Tsilimpiou became particularly popular in Greece after her participation in the 2006 Greek television series Gia tin kardia enos angelou and the hit Greek television series To Nisi. She played as blind child in theater. Tsilimpiou made her acting debut with a major role in the popular Turkish television series Muhteşem Yüzyıl: Kösem.

== Early life ==
Tsilimpiou was born on 12 November 1997, in Athens to Viorel and Fotini Tsilimpiou. She has an older brother, Konstantinos. Her father is from Romania and her mother from Greece. At the age of 5, she began working as a child model by participating in advertisements and photo shoots for Greek magazines.

== Career ==
In 2015, after graduating from school, she was cast as Kösem Sultan (teenage role) in the Turkish series of the same name. Thus, she moved to Turkey for a few months. The series premiered on 12 November 2015 on the Turkish channel Star TV and then aired in many Asian countries. Also, in the same year, she played in the show "The Slave" (directed by Nikos Tserga) at the Municipal Theatre of Kallithea.

In 2016, she participated in the theatrical performance "Dionysian Night" (dir. Roula Hamou) at the Athens Theatre and in the web short series "Follow The Wind". In 2017 she made a brief appearance again in the series "Kiosem: The Sultana" and performed in "Playing Gods" (dir. Anne-Marie O'Sullivan) at the Asomaton Art Theatre.

In 2018, she played in the theatre performance "Loxandra" (dir. Sotiris Hatzakis) at the Veaki Theatre, in the film "We ate together" and in the web series "Off the Matter". In the 2018-2019 season she participated in the Cypriot series "Wrath", which was subsequently broadcast in Greece.

In the 2021-2022 season, she starred in the MEGA series "Komanda and Dragons" and in the theatrical performance "Comedy Lessons" (directed by Thodoris Atheridis) at Mikro Pallas. In the 2022-2023 season, she starred in the ALPHA series "This Night Remains" and in the Alpha TV series "The Beetle" (after O Paradisos).

== Filmography ==
Television
Year	Title	Role	Note
2006–2007	Gia Tin Kardia Enos Angelou	Elpida	Leading role
2009	40 Kymata	Young Christina	Guest star
2010	To Nisi	Young Mary Petraki	Episodes 1-8
2010	O Polemos Ton Astron	Young Zinovia	Episode: "Pos Na Rikseis Enan Toxoti"
2015, 2017	Muhteşem Yüzyıl: Kösem	Young Kösem Sultan	Main role (episodes 1–6); Guest star (episode 60)
2016	Follow the Wind	Young Natalie	Short
2018–2019	Orgi	Olga	Main role
2021	Komanta Kai Drakoi (Commandos and Dragons)	Nafsiká	Main role

Cinema
Year	Title	Note
2018	Mazi Ta Fagame	Film debut

== Theatre ==
Theatre
Year	Title	Role
2008–2010	To thávma tis Anny Sálivan	Helen Keller
2015	To Sklavi	Princess
2016	Dionisiaki Nixta	
2017	Playing Gods	Aphrodite
2018	Loxandra	

== Awards and nominations ==
Year	Award	Category	Work	Result
2009	Corfu acting theatre award	Young actress to play "Helen Keller" in theatre play To thafma tis Anne Sullivan	Helen Keller	Won
