= Ahmed I =

Sultan of the Ottoman Empire from 1603 to 1617

- Custodian of the Two Holy Mosques
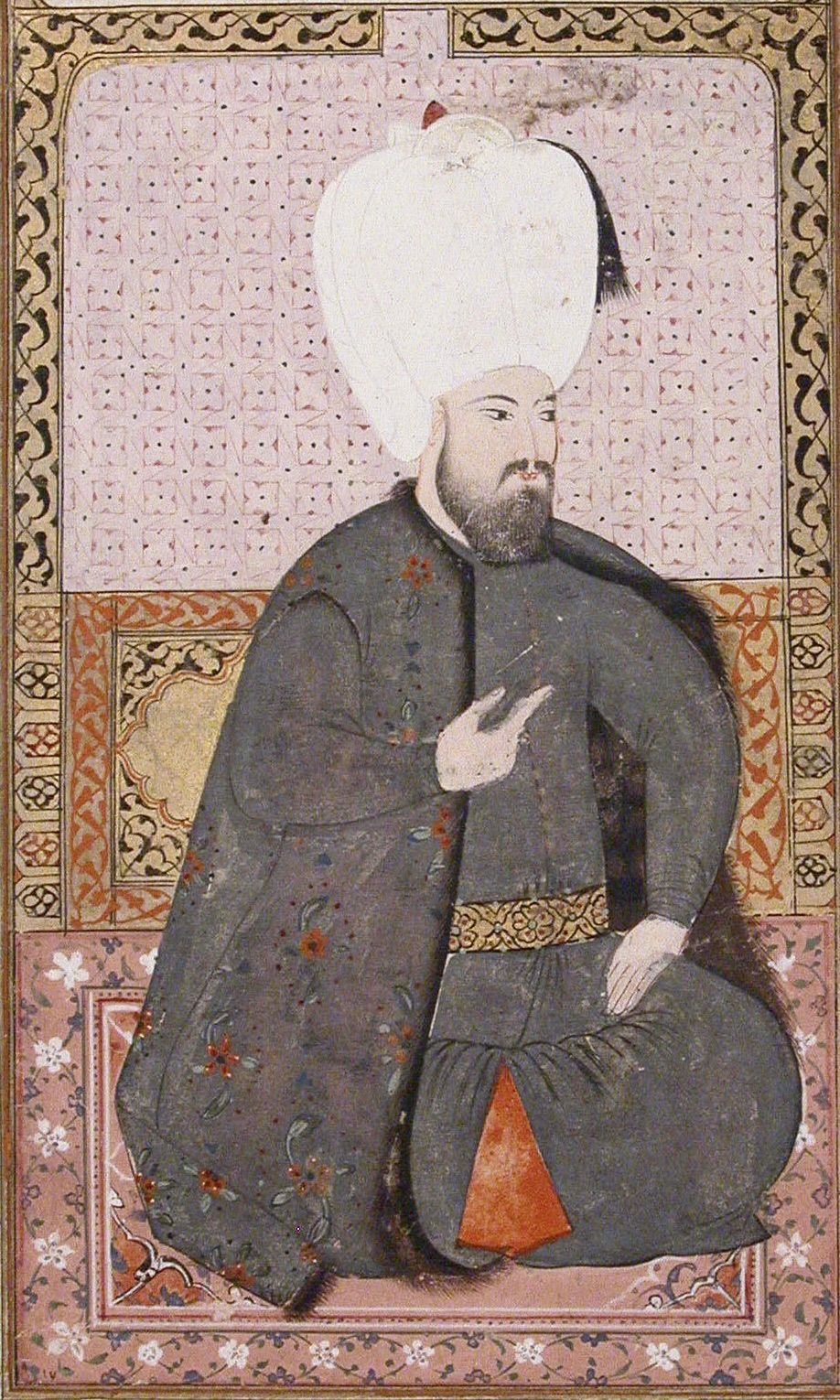
- Contemporary Ottoman portrait of Sultan Ahmed I. Metropolitan Museum of Art.

Sultan of the Ottoman Empire (Padishah)
- Reign: 22 December 1603 – 22 November 1617
- Predecessor: Mehmed III
- Successor: Mustafa I

Ottoman caliph (Amir al-Mu'minin)
- Predecessor: Mehmed III
- Successor: Mustafa I
- Born: 18 April 1590; Manisa Palace, Manisa, Ottoman Empire
- Died: 22 November 1617 (aged 27); Topkapı Palace, Constantinople, Ottoman Empire
- Burial: Sultan Ahmed Mosque, Istanbul, Turkey
- Consorts: Mahfiruz Hatun; Kösem Sultan; Fatma Hatun
- Issue Among others: Osman II; Şehzade Mehmed; Ayşe Sultan; Gevherhan Sultan; Fatma Sultan; Hanzade Sultan; Murad IV; Şehzade Bayezid; Şehzade Süleyman; Şehzade Kasım; Atike Sultan; Ibrahim I
Names
- Şah Ahmed bin Mehmed Han
- Dynasty: Ottoman
- Father: Mehmed III
- Mother: Handan Sultan
- Religion: Sunni Islam
- Tughra

Ahmed I (Ottoman Turkish: احمد اول Aḥmed-i evvel; Turkish: I. Ahmed; 18 April 1590 – 22 November 1617) was the sultan of the Ottoman Empire from 1603 until his death in 1617.

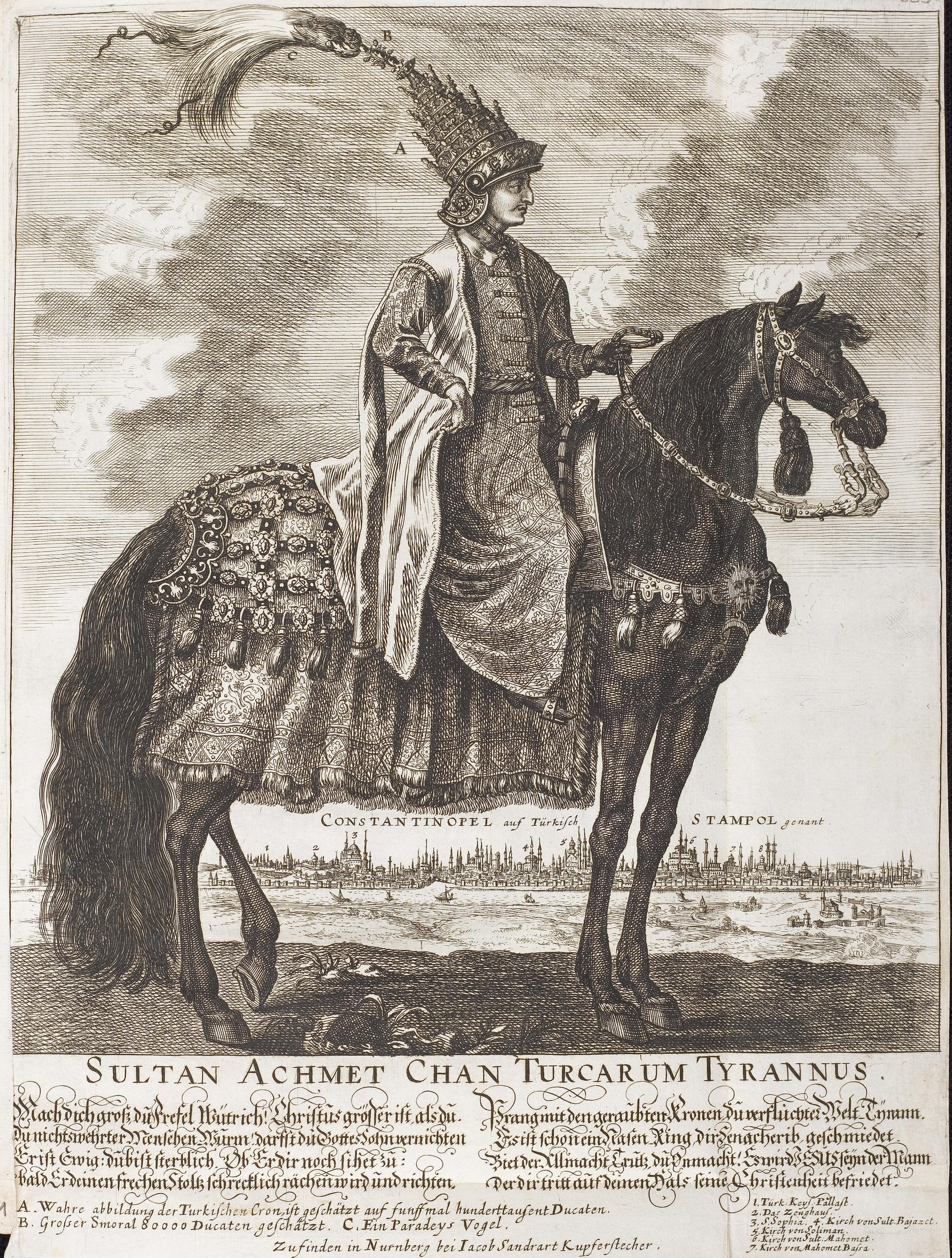
Four-tiered crown built during the reign of Suleiman the Magnificent, depicted with Ahmed I

Ahmed's reign is noteworthy for marking the first breach in the Ottoman tradition of royal fratricide; henceforth, Ottoman rulers would no longer systematically execute their brothers upon accession to the throne. He is also well known for his construction of the Blue Mosque, one of the most famous mosques in Turkey.

== Early life ==
Ahmed was born at the Manisa Palace, Manisa, probably on 18 April 1590 to Şehzade Mehmed and his concubine Handan Sultan. He was the grandson of Sultan Murad III and his Haseki, Safiye Sultan. Ahmed lived in Manisa until his grandfather's death in January 1595, after which Ahmed accompanied his father to Istanbul for his enthronement.

Shortly after his enthronement, Sultan Mehmed III ordered the execution of his nineteen half brothers in accordance with the Ottoman practice of fratricide. Ahmed's elder half-brother Şehzade Mahmud was also executed by his father on 7 June 1603, just months before Mehmed's own death on 22 December 1603. Mahmud was buried along with his mother Halime Sultan, who died sometime after 1623, in a separate mausoleum commissioned by Ahmed in Şehzade Mosque in Constantinople (present-day Istanbul.

== Reign ==
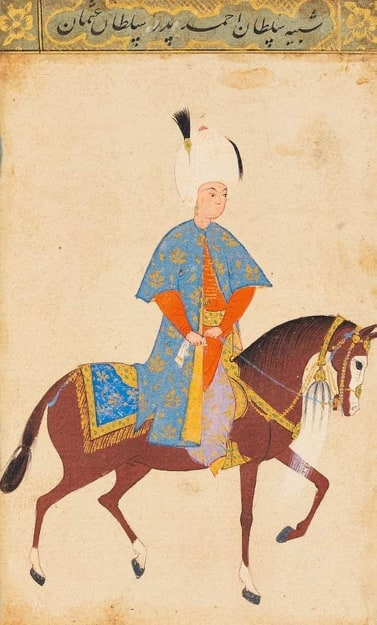
Sultan Ahmed I as a young prince, 17th century

Ahmed ascended the throne after his father's death in 1603, at the age of thirteen, when his powerful grandmother Safiye Sultan was still alive. With his accession to the throne, the power struggle in the harem flared up; between his mother Handan Sultan and his grandmother Safiye Sultan, who in the previous reign had absolute power within the walls (behind the throne), in the end, with the support of Ahmed, the fight ended in favor of his mother. Ahmed broke with the traditional fratricide following previous enthronements and did not order the execution of his three year old half-brother Mustafa, the second son of Halime Sultan. Instead, Mustafa was sent to live at the old palace at Bayezit along with his mother and their grandmother, Safiye Sultan. This was most likely due to Ahmed's young age - he had not yet demonstrated his ability to sire children, and Mustafa was then the only other candidate for the Ottoman throne. His brother's execution would have endangered the dynasty, and thus he was spared.

His mother tried to interfere in his affairs and influence his decision, especially she wanted to control his communication and movements. In the earlier part of his reign, Ahmed I showed decision and vigor, which were belied by his subsequent conduct. The wars in Hungary and Persia, which attended his accession, terminated unfavourably for the empire. Its prestige was further tarnished in the Treaty of Zsitvatorok, signed in 1606, whereby the annual tribute paid by Austria was abolished. Following the crushing defeat in the Ottoman–Safavid War (1603–1612) against the neighbouring rivals Safavid Empire, led by Shah Abbas the Great, Georgia, Azerbaijan and other vast territories in the Caucasus were ceded back to Persia per the Treaty of Nasuh Pasha in 1612, territories that had been temporarily conquered in the Ottoman–Safavid War (1578–90). The new borders were drawn per the same line as confirmed in the Peace of Amasya of 1555.

=== Relations with Morocco ===
During his reign, the ruler of Morocco was Mulay Zidan whose father and predecessor Ahmad al-Mansur had paid a tribute of vassalage to the Ottomans until his death. The Saadi civil wars had interrupted this tribute of vassalage, but Mulay Zidan proposed to submit to it in order to protect himself from Algiers, and so he resumed paying the tribute to the Ottomans.

=== Ottoman-Safavid War: 1604–06 ===
The Ottoman–Safavid War had begun shortly before the death of Ahmed's father Mehmed III. Upon ascending the throne, Ahmed I appointed Cigalazade Yusuf Sinan Pasha as the commander of the eastern army. The army marched from Constantinople on 15 June 1604, which was too late, and by the time it had arrived on the eastern front on 8 November 1604, the Safavid army had captured Yerevan and entered the Kars Eyalet, and could only be stopped in Akhaltsikhe. Despite the conditions being favourable, Sinan Pasha decided to stay for the winter in Van, but then marched to Erzurum to stop an incoming Safavid attack. This caused unrest within the army and the year was practically wasted for the Ottomans.

In 1605, Sinan Pasha marched to take Tabriz, but the army was undermined by Köse Sefer Pasha, the Beylerbey of Erzurum, marching independently from Sinan Pasha and consequently being taken prisoner by the Safavids. The Ottoman army was routed at Urmia and had to flee firstly to Van and then to Diyarbekir. Here, Sinan Pasha sparked a rebellion by executing the Beylerbey of Aleppo, Canbulatoğlu Hüseyin Pasha, who had come to provide help, upon the pretext that he had arrived too late. He soon died himself and the Safavid army was able to capture Ganja, Shirvan and Shamakhi in Azerbaijan.

=== War with the Habsburgs: 1604–06 ===
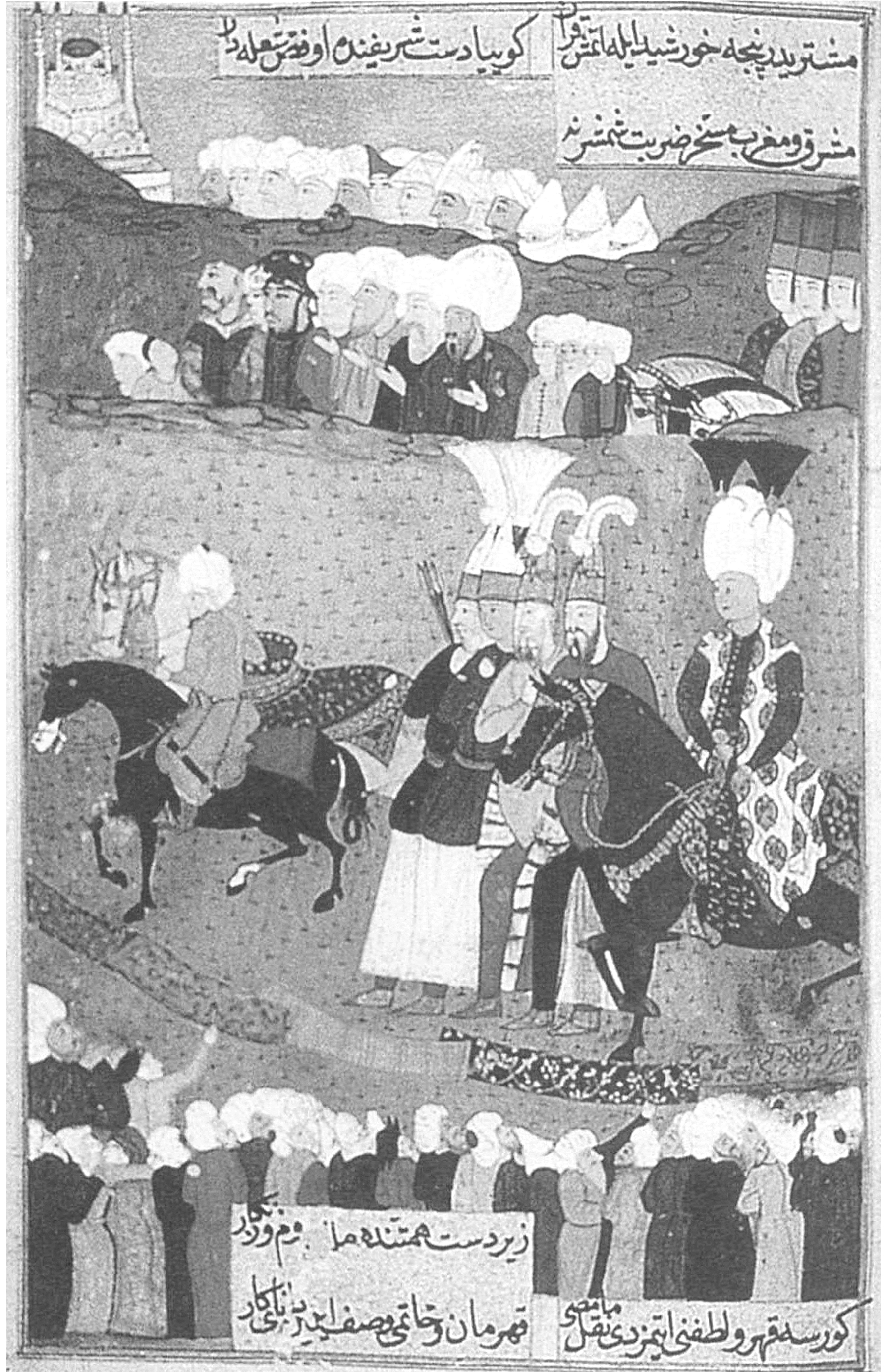
Arrival of Ahmed I at Edirne. Nadiri's Diwan, ca. 1605.

The Long Turkish War between the Ottomans and the Habsburg monarchy had been going on for over a decade by the time Ahmed ascended the throne. Grand Vizier Malkoç Ali Pasha marched to the western front from Constantinople on 3 June 1604 and arrived in Belgrade, but died there, so Sokolluzade Lala Mehmed Pasha was appointed as the Grand Vizier and the commander of the western army. Under Mehmed Pasha, the western army recaptured Pest and Vác, but failed to capture Esztergom as the siege was lifted due to unfavourable weather and the objections of the soldiers. Meanwhile, the Prince of Transylvania, Stephen Bocskay, who struggled for the region's independence and had formerly supported the Habsburgs, sent a messenger to the Porte asking for help. Upon the promise of help, his forces also joined the Ottoman forces in Belgrade. With this help, the Ottoman army besieged Esztergom and captured it on 4 November 1605. Bocskai, with Ottoman help, captured Nové Zámky (Uyvar) and forces under Tiryaki Hasan Pasha took Veszprém and Palota. Sarhoş İbrahim Pasha, the Beylerbey of Nagykanizsa (Kanije), attacked the Austrian region of Istria. However, with Jelali revolts in Anatolia more dangerous than ever and a defeat in the eastern front, Mehmed Pasha was called to Constantinople. Mehmed Pasha suddenly died there, whilst preparing to leave for the east. Kuyucu Murad Pasha then negotiated the Peace of Zsitvatorok, which abolished the tribute of 30,000 ducats paid by Austria and addressed the Habsburg emperor as the equal of the Ottoman sultan. The Jelali revolts were a strong factor in the Ottomans' acceptance of the terms. This signaled the end of Ottoman growth in Europe.

=== Jelali revolts ===
Resentment over the war with the Habsburgs and heavy taxation, along with the weakness of the Ottoman military response, combined to make the reign of Ahmed I the zenith of the Jelali revolts. Tavil Ahmed launched a revolt soon after the coronation of Ahmed I and defeated Nasuh Pasha and the Beylerbey of Anatolia, Kecdehan Ali Pasha. In 1605, Tavil Ahmed was offered the position of the Beylerbey of Shahrizor to stop his rebellion, but soon afterwards he went on to capture Harput. His son, Mehmed, obtained the governorship of Baghdad with a fake firman and defeated the forces of Nasuh Pasha sent to defeat him.

Meanwhile, Canbulatoğlu Ali Pasha united his forces with the Druze Sheikh Ma'noğlu Fahreddin to defeat the Amir of Tripoli Seyfoğlu Yusuf. He went on to take control of the Adana area, forming an army and issuing coins. His forces routed the army of the newly appointed Beylerbey of Aleppo, Hüseyin Pasha. Grand Vizier Boşnak Dervish Mehmed Pasha was executed for the weakness he showed against the Jelalis. He was replaced by Kuyucu Murad Pasha, who marched to Syria with his forces to defeat the 30,000-strong rebel army with great difficulty, albeit with a decisive result, on 24 October 1607. Meanwhile, he pretended to forgive the rebels in Anatolia and appointed the rebel Kalenderoğlu, who was active in Manisa and Bursa, as the sanjakbey of Ankara. Baghdad was recaptured in 1607 as well. Canbulatoğlu Ali Pasha fled to Constantinople and asked for forgiveness from Ahmed I, who appointed him to Timișoara and later Belgrade, but then executed him due to his misrule there. Meanwhile, Kalenderoğlu was not allowed in the city by the people of Ankara and rebelled again, only to be crushed by Murad Pasha's forces. Kalenderoğlu ended up fleeing to Persia. Murad Pasha then suppressed some smaller revolts in Central Anatolia and suppressed other Jelali chiefs by inviting them to join the army.

Due to the widespread violence of the Jelali revolts, a great number of people had fled their villages and a lot of villages were destroyed. Some military chiefs had claimed these abandoned villages as their property. This deprived the Porte of tax income and on 30 September 1609, Ahmed I issued a letter guaranteeing the rights of the villagers. He then worked on the resettlement of abandoned villages.

=== Ottoman-Safavid War: Peace and continuation ===
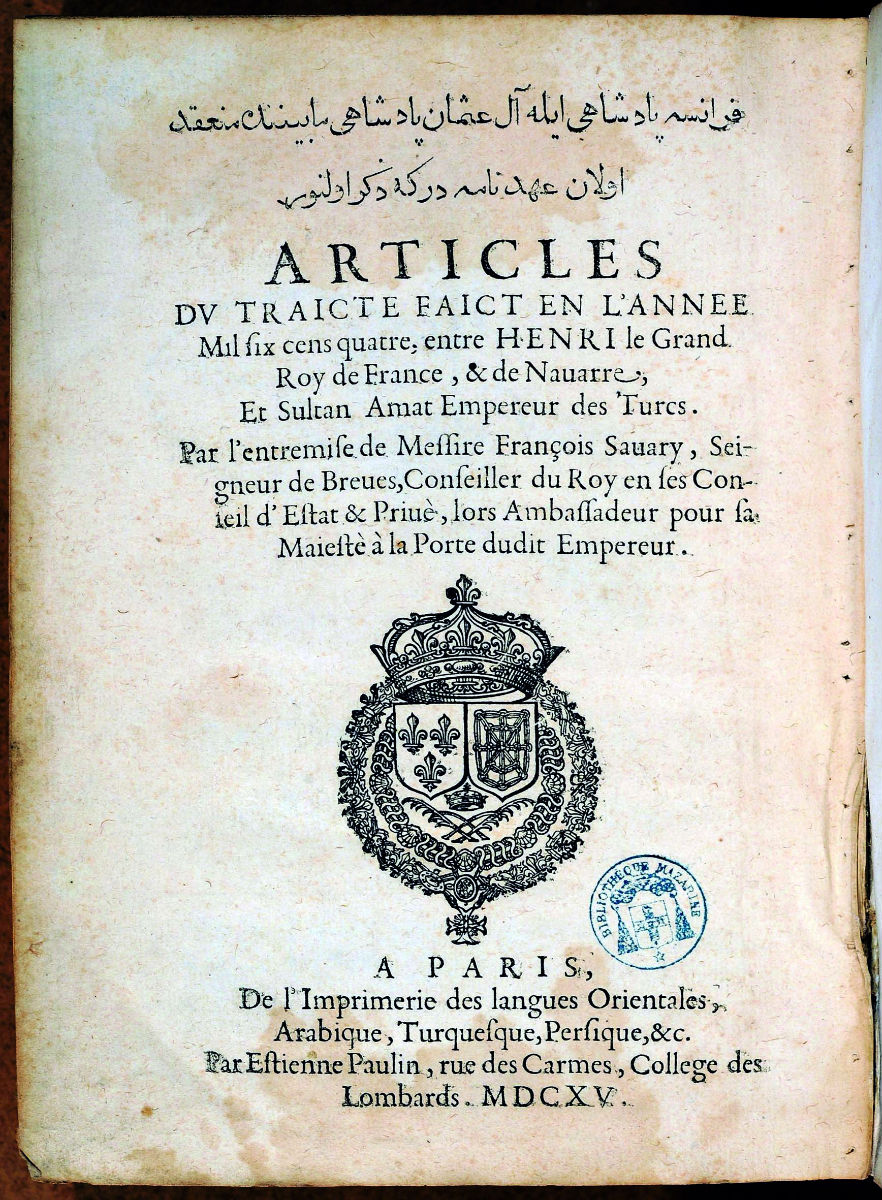
Bilingual Franco-Turkish translation of the 1604 Franco-Ottoman Capitulations between Ahmed I and Henry IV of France, published by François Savary de Brèves in 1615

The new Grand Vizier, Nasuh Pasha, did not want to fight with the Safavids. The Safavid Shah also sent a letter saying that he was willing to sign a peace treaty, with which he would have to send 200 loads of silk every year to Constantinople. On 20 November 1612, the Treaty of Nasuh Pasha was signed, which ceded all the lands the Ottoman Empire had gained in the war of 1578–90 back to Persia and reinstated the 1555 boundaries.

However, the peace ended in 1615 when the Shah did not send the 200 loads of silk. On 22 May 1615, Grand Vizier Öküz Mehmed Pasha was assigned to organize an attack on Persia. Mehmed Pasha delayed the attack till the next year, until when the Safavids made their preparations and attacked Ganja. In April 1616, Mehmed Pasha left Aleppo with a large army and marched to Yerevan, where he failed to take the city and withdrew to Erzurum. He was removed from his post and replaced by Damat Halil Pasha. Halil Pasha went for the winter to Diyarbekir, while the Khan of Crimea, Canibek Giray, attacked the areas of Ganja, Nakhichevan and Julfa.

=== Capitulations and trade treaties ===
Ahmed I renewed trade treaties with England, France and Venice. In July 1612, the first ever trade treaty with the Dutch Republic was signed. He expanded the capitulations given to France, specifying that merchants from Spain, Ragusa, Genoa, Ancona and Florence could trade under the French flag.

=== Architect and service to Islam ===
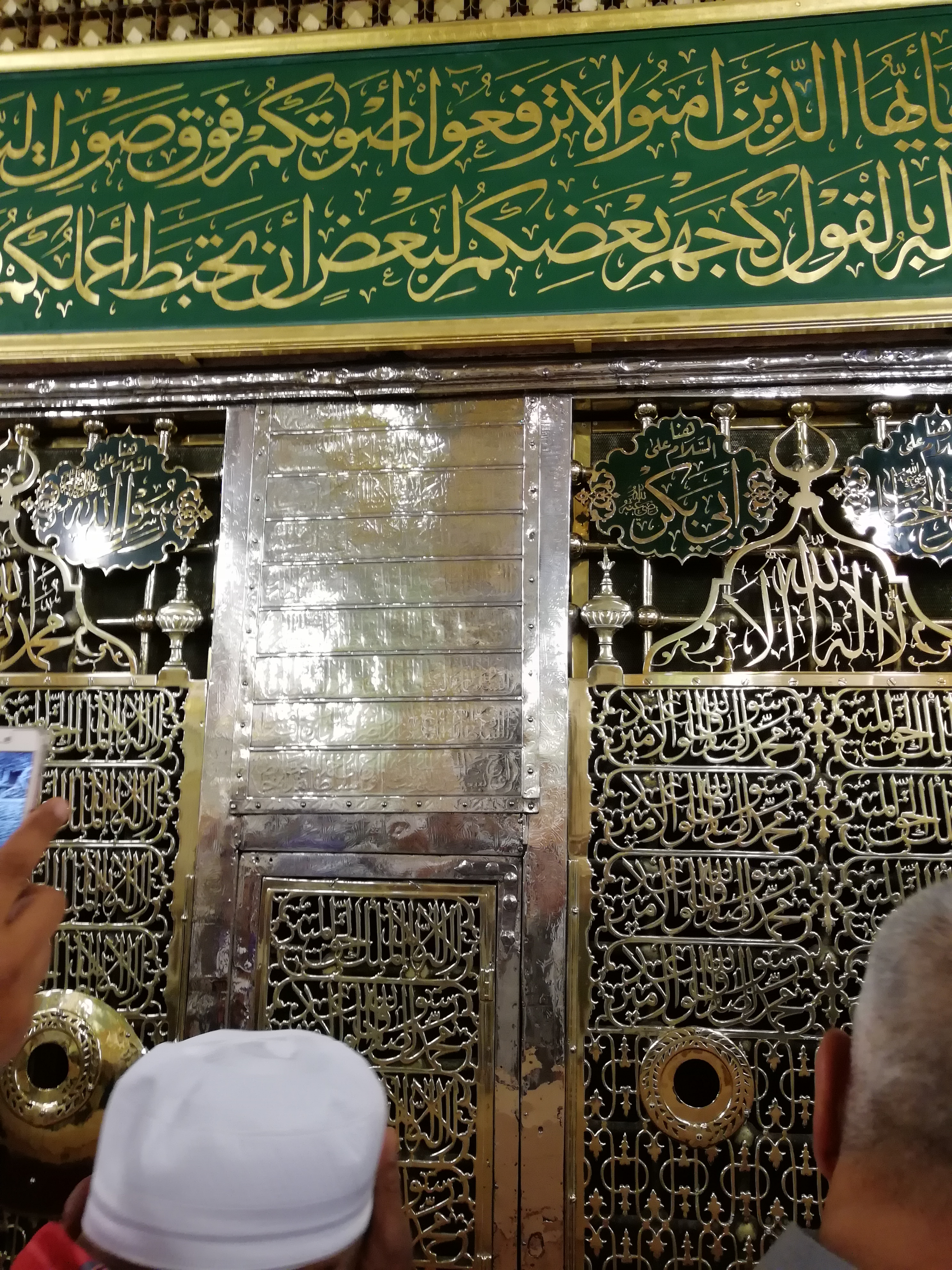
Ahmed I plate at Masjid al-Nabawi marking Bab al-Tawba

Sultan Ahmed constructed the Sultan Ahmed Mosque across from the Hagia Sophia. The sultan attended the breaking of the ground with a golden pickaxe to begin the construction of the mosque complex. An incident nearly broke out after the sultan discovered that the Blue Mosque contained the same number of minarets as the grand mosque of Mecca. Ahmed became furious at this fault and became remorseful until the Shaykh al-Islām recommended that he should erect another minaret at the grand mosque of Mecca and the matter was solved.

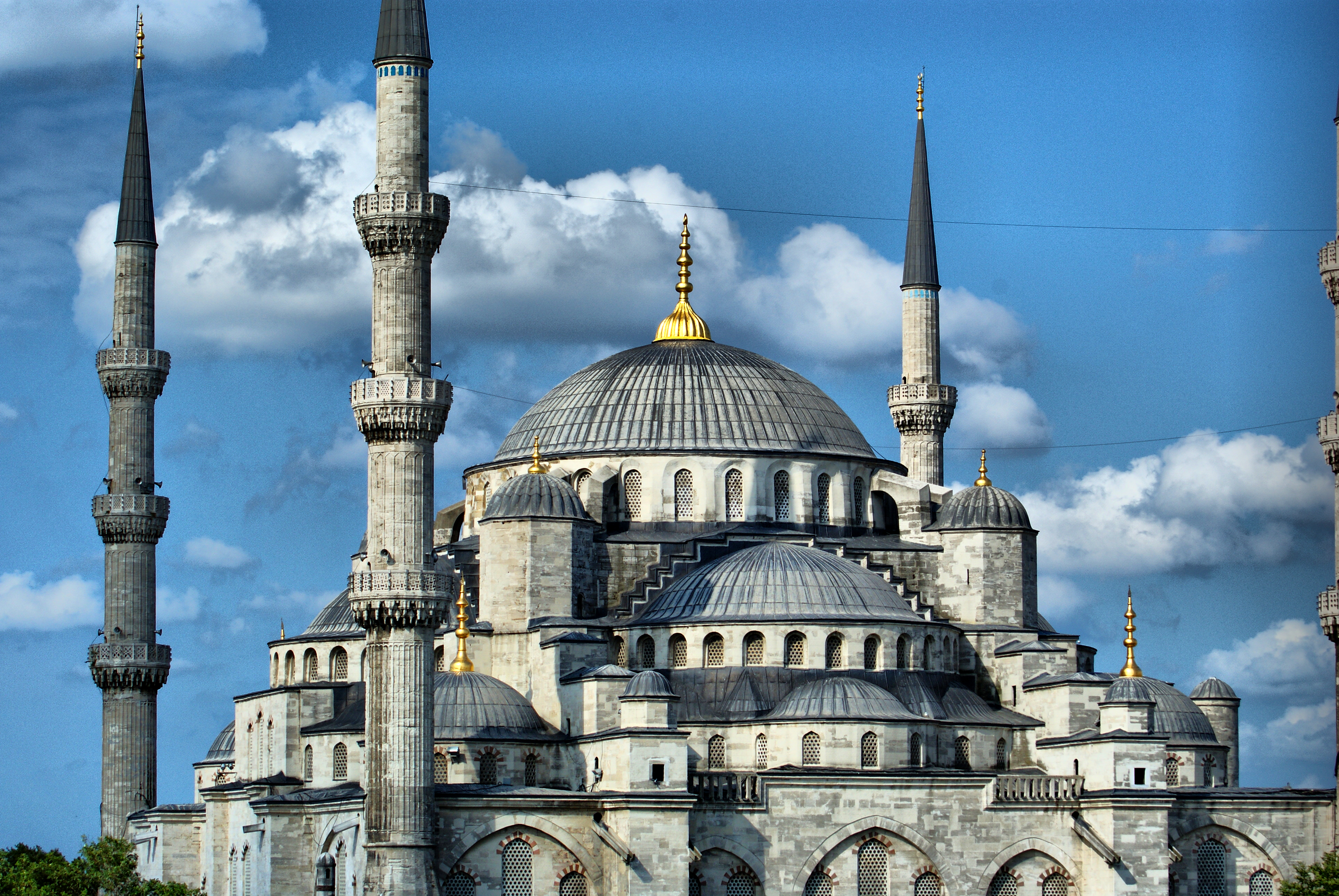
The Sultan Ahmed Mosque

Ahmed became delightedly involved in the eleventh comprehensive renovations of the Kaaba, which had just been damaged by flooding. He sent craftsmen from Constantinople, and the golden rain gutter that kept rain from collecting on the roof of the Ka’ba was successfully renewed. It was again during the era of Sultan Ahmed that an iron web was placed inside the Zamzam Well in Mecca. The placement of this web about three feet below the water level was a response to lunatics who jumped into the well, imagining a promise of a heroic death.

In Medina, the city of the Islamic prophet Muhammad, a new pulpit made of white marble and shipped from Constantinople arrived in the mosque of Muhammad and substituted the old, worn-out pulpit. It is also known that Sultan Ahmed erected two more mosques in Uskudar on the Asian side of Istanbul; however, neither of them has survived.

The sultan had a crest carved with the footprint of Muhammad that he would wear on Fridays and festive days and illustrated one of the most significant examples of affection to Muhammad in Ottoman history. Engraved inside the crest was a poem he composed:

If only could I bear over my head like my turban forever thee, If only I could carry it all the time with me, on my head like a crown, the Footprint of the Prophet Muhammad, which has a beautiful complexion, Ahmed, go on, rub your face on the feet of that rose.

== Character ==
Sultan Ahmed was known for his skills in fencing, poetry, horseback riding, and fluency in several languages.

Ahmed was a poet who wrote a number of political and lyrical works under the name Bahti. Ahmed patronized scholars, calligraphers, and pious men. Hence, he commissioned a book entitled The Quintessence of Histories to be worked upon by calligraphers. He also attempted to enforce conformance to Islamic laws and traditions, restoring the old regulations that prohibited alcohol, and he attempted to enforce attendance at Friday prayers and paying alms to the poor in the proper way.

== Family ==
Ahmed had three known consorts and many unnamed ones, mothers of the other princes and princesses.

- Hatice Mahfiruz Hatun (c. 1590 – c. 1608, 1620 or 1628) — his first concubine; mother of his firstborn son, the future sultan Osman II, and other sons and daughters.
- Fatma Hatun — his second or third concubine.
- Mahpeyker Kösem Sultan (c. 1589 – 2 September 1651) — his second or third concubine, haseki sultan and possible legal wife; mother of most of his children who survived past infancy, among them the future sultans Murad IV and Ibrahim I.

=== Sons ===
Ahmed I had at least thirteen sons:

- Osman II (3 November 1604, Constantinople, Topkapı Palace – 20 May 1622, Constantinople; killed by the janissaries and buried in the Ahmed I Mausoleum, Sultan Ahmed Mosque) — with Mahfiruz Hatun
- Şehzade Mehmed (11 March 1605, Constantinople, Topkapı Palace – 12 January 1621, Constantinople, Topkapı Palace; executed at the order of Osman II and buried in the Ahmed I Mausoleum, Sultan Ahmed Mosque) — with Kösem Sultan
- Şehzade Orhan (1609, Constantinople – 1612, Constantinople; buried in the Ahmed I Mausoleum, Sultan Ahmed Mosque) — possibly with Kösem Sultan
- Şehzade Cihangir (1609, Constantinople – 1609, Constantinople; buried in the Ahmed I Mausoleum, Sultan Ahmed Mosque)
- Unnamed son (1610/1611, Constantinople – 1612, Constantinople)
- Şehzade Selim (27 June 1611, Constantinople – 27 July 1611, Constantinople; buried in the Ahmed I Mausoleum, Sultan Ahmed Mosque) — possibly with Kösem Sultan
- Murad IV (27 July 1612, Constantinople – 8 February 1640, Constantinople, Topkapı Palace; buried in the Ahmed I Mausoleum, Sultan Ahmed Mosque) — with Kösem Sultan
- Şehzade Bayezid (December 1612, Constantinople – 27 July 1635, Constantinople, Topkapı Palace; executed at the order of Murad IV and buried in the Ahmed I Mausoleum, Sultan Ahmed Mosque) —with Mahfiruz Hatun
- Şehzade Hüseyin (November 1613, Constantinople – 1617, Constantinople, Topkapı Palace; buried in the Mehmed III Mausoleum, Hagia Sophia) — with Mahfiruz Hatun
- Şehzade Süleyman (1611/12 or 1615 Constantinople – 27 July 1635, Constantinople, Topkapı Palace; executed at the order of Murad IV and buried in the Ahmed I Mausoleum, Sultan Ahmed Mosque) — with Mahfiruz Hatun or Kösem Sultan. There is some confusion with Huseyin between archival and narrative sources.
- Şehzade Hasan (1614, Constantinople – 1615, Constantinople; buried in the Ahmed I Mausoleum, Sultan Ahmed Mosque)
- Şehzade Kasım (1614, Constantinople – 17 February 1638, Constantinople, Topkapı Palace; executed at the order of Murad IV and buried in the Murad III Mausoleum, Hagia Sophia) — with Kösem Sultan
- Ibrahim (13 October 1617, Constantinople – 18 August 1648, Constantinople, Topkapı Palace; killed by the janissaries and buried in the Ibrahim I Mausoleum, Hagia Sophia) — with Kösem Sultan

=== Daughters ===
Ahmed I had at least twelve daughters:

- Unnamed daughter (early 1605, Constantinople – ?)
- Gevherhan Sultan (c. 1605/06 or 1608, Constantinople – 18 April 1631, Constantinople; buried in the Ahmed I Mausoleum, Sultan Ahmed Mosque) — with Kösem Sultan or Mahfiruz Hatun
- Ayşe Sultan (c. 1606 or late 1608, Constantinople – 1657, Constantinople; buried in the Ahmed I Mausoleum, Sultan Ahmed Mosque) — with Kösem Sultan
- Fatma Sultan (c. 1606 or late 1608, Constantinople – 1670, Constantinople; buried in the Ahmed I Mausoleum, Sultan Ahmed Mosque) — with Kösem Sultan
- Hanzade Sultan (1607, Constantinople – 21 September 1650, Constantinople; buried in the Ibrahim I Mausoleum, Hagia Sophia) — with Kösem Sultan
- Hatice Sultan (after 1608, Constantinople – 1610, Constantinople; buried in the Ahmed I Mausoleum, Sultan Ahmed Mosque)
- Esma Sultan (1612, Constantinople – 1612, Constantinople; buried in the Ahmed I Mausoleum, Sultan Ahmed Mosque)
- Zahide Sultan (1613, Constantinople – 1620, Constantinople; buried in the Ahmed I Mausoleum, Sultan Ahmed Mosque)
- Burnaz Atike Sultan (c. 1614, Constantinople – 1674, Constantinople; buried in the Ibrahim I Mausoleum, Hagia Sophia) — possibly with Kösem Sultan
- Ümmühan Sultan (before 1616 – after 1688); she married Shehit Ali Pasha.
- Zeynep Sultan (1617, Constantinople – 1619, Constantinople; buried in the Ahmed I Mausoleum, Sultan Ahmed Mosque)
- Abide or Übeyde Sultan (1618, Constantinople – 1648, Constantinople; buried in the Ahmed I Mausoleum, Sultan Ahmed Mosque); she married Koca Musa Pasha (d. 1647) in 1642.

== Death and legacy ==
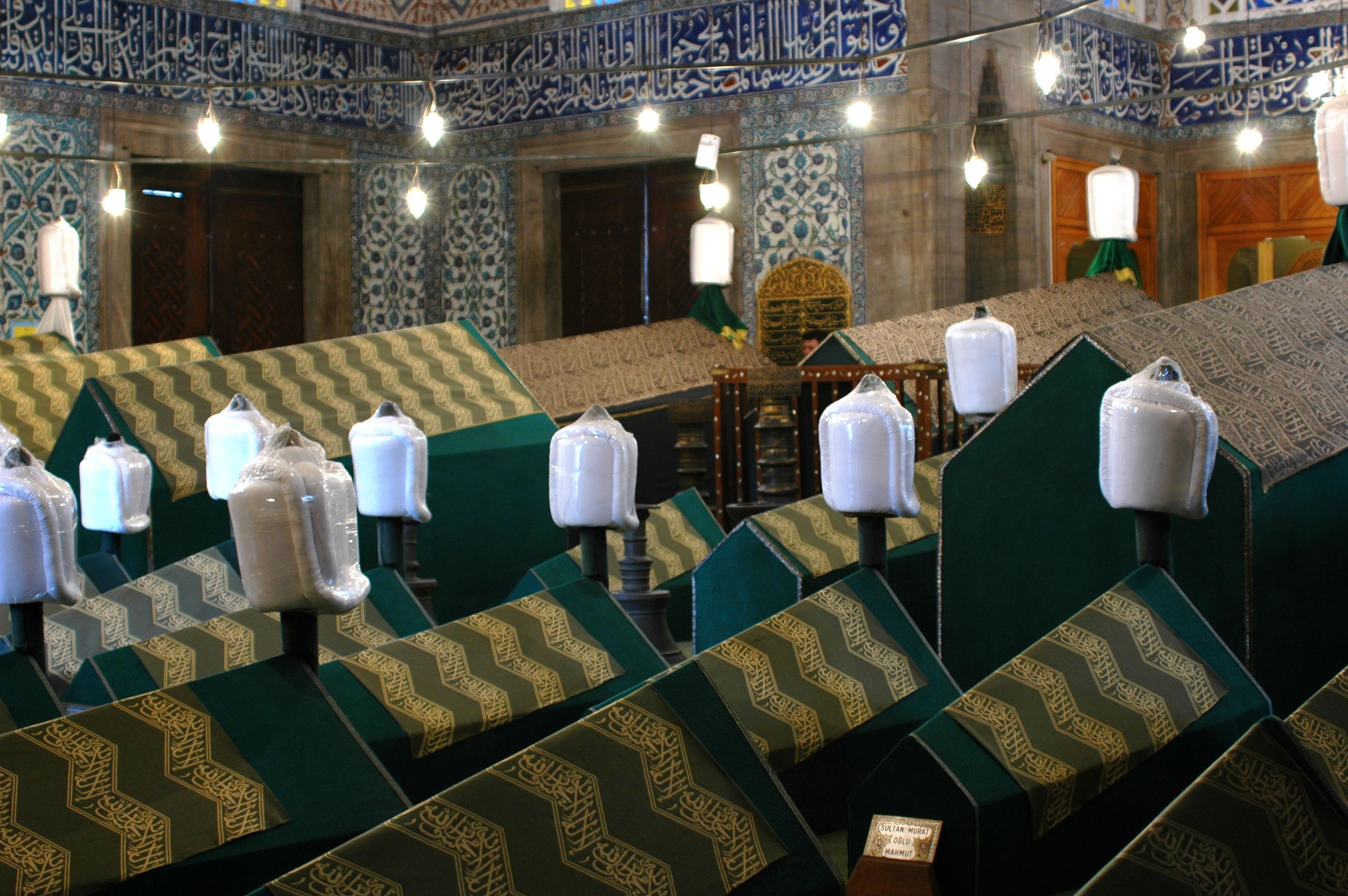
Ahmed I's türbe

Ahmed I died of typhus and gastric bleeding on 22 November 1617 at the Topkapı Palace, Constantinople. He was buried in Ahmed I Mausoleum, Sultan Ahmed Mosque. He was succeeded by his younger half-brother Şehzade Mustafa as Sultan Mustafa I. Later, three of Ahmed's sons ascended to the throne: Osman II (r. 1618–22), Murad IV (r. 1623–40) and Ibrahim (r. 1640–48).

=== Legacy ===
Today, Ahmed I is remembered mainly for the construction of the Sultan Ahmed Mosque (also known as the Blue Mosque), one of the masterpieces of Islamic architecture. The area in Fatih around the Mosque is today called Sultanahmet. He died at Topkapı Palace in Constantinople and is buried in a mausoleum right outside the walls of the famous mosque.

=== In popular culture ===
- In the 2010 film Mahpeyker: Kösem Sultan, Ahmed I is played by Turkish actor Gökhan Mumcu.
- In the 2015 TV series Muhteşem Yüzyıl: Kösem, Ahmed I is played by Turkish actor Ekin Koç.

== See also ==
- Transformation of the Ottoman Empire

== Sources ==
- Blair, Sheila S.; Bloom, Jonathan M. (1995). The Art and Architecture of Islam 1250-1800. Yale University Press. ISBN 9780300064650.
- Goodwin, Godfrey (1971). A History of Ottoman Architecture. London: Thames & Hudson. ISBN 978-0-500-27429-3.
- Kuban, Doğan (2010). Ottoman Architecture. Translated by Mill, Adair. Antique Collectors' Club. ISBN 9781851496044.
- Peirce, Leslie (1993). The Imperial Harem: Women and Sovereignty in the Ottoman Empire. Oxford University Press. ISBN 0-19-508677-5.

Ahmed I House of Osman Born: April 18, 1590 Died: November 22, 1617[aged 27]
Regnal titles
Preceded by Mehmed III	Sultan of the Ottoman Empire; December 22, 1603 – November 22, 1617	Succeeded by Mustafa I
Sunni Islam titles
Preceded by Mehmed III	Caliph of the Ottoman Caliphate; December 22, 1603 – November 22, 1617	Succeeded by Mustafa I
