= Şehzade Mehmed (son of Ahmed I) =

Ottoman prince (1605–1621)

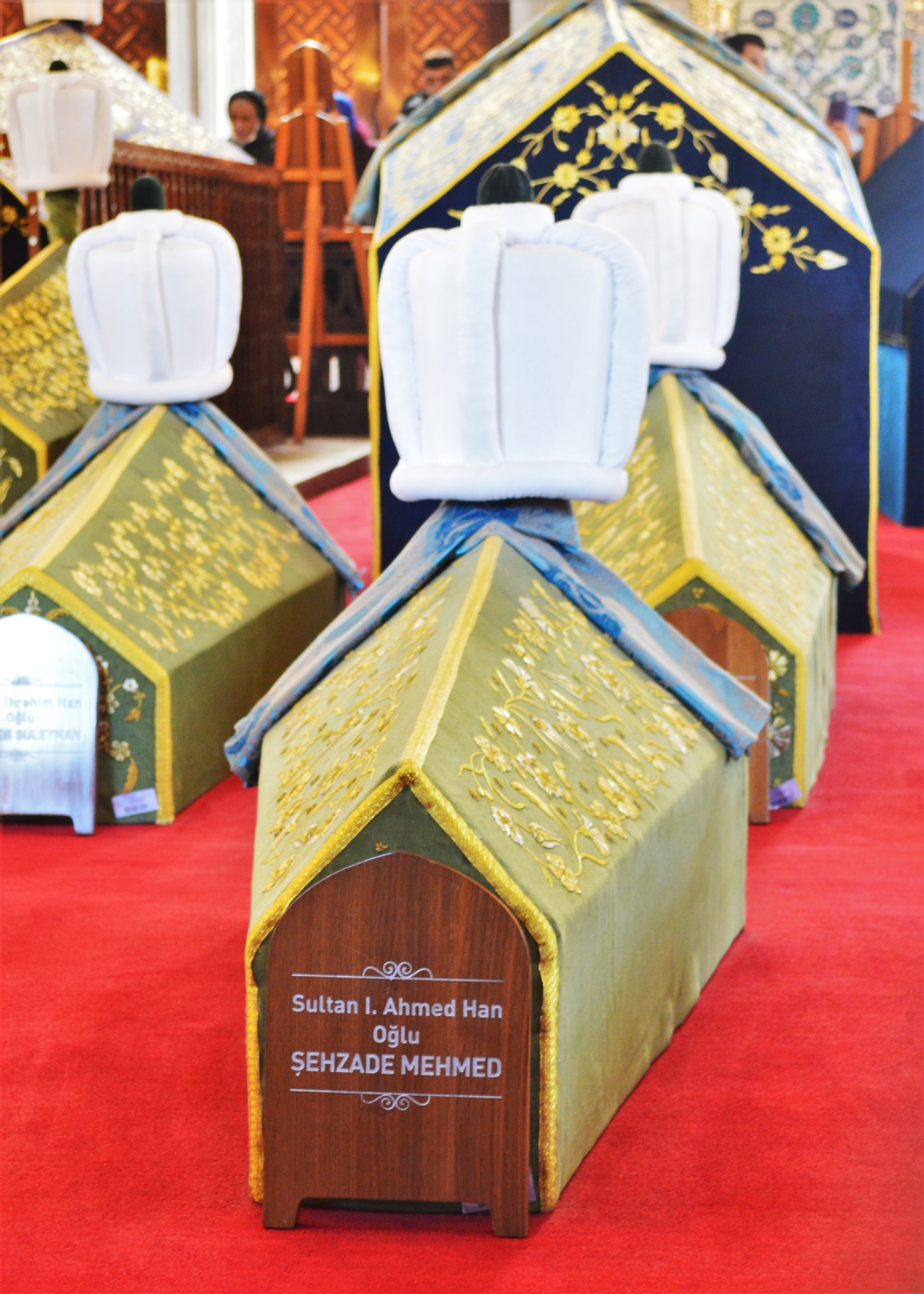
- The sarcophagus of Şehzade Mehmed is located in the Ahmed I Mausoleum, Blue Mosque, Istanbul, Turkey
- Born: 11 March 1605; Istanbul, Ottoman Empire (modern day Istanbul, Turkey)
- Died: 12 January 1621 (aged 15); Istanbul, Ottoman Empire
- Burial: Ahmed I Mausoleum, Blue Mosque, Istanbul
- Father: Ahmed I
- Mother: Kösem Sultan
- Religion: Sunni Islam

Şehzade Mehmed (Ottoman Turkish: شہزادہ محمد; 11 March 1605 – 12 January 1621) was an Ottoman prince, son of Sultan Ahmed I and Kösem Sultan (Ahmed's Haseki and legal wife).

== Life ==
Şehzade Mehmed was born on 11 March 1605 in Istanbul. He was the second son of his father Sultan Ahmed I and the first of his mother Kösem Sultan, Ahmed's Haseki sultan. In January 1609, Mehmed began his education under the guardianship of Hoca Ömer Efendi, together with his elder half brother, Şehzade Osman (future Sultan Osman II).

After his father's death in 1617, when Mehmed was twelve years old, his uncle Sultan Mustafa I ascended the throne. However, he was soon deposed and replaced by Osman in 1618.

== Death ==
Osman had asked the Şeyhülislam Hocazade Esad Efendi for an affirmative legal opinion to execute his brother. However, Esad Efendi refused to issue legal opinion. The Chief Judge of Rumeli Kemaleddin Efendi instead affirmed the execution of the prince. And so on 12 January 1621, Mehmed was executed. When the executioners were stretching rope on his neck he spoke:

"Osman! I wish from Allah your reign get ruined, I hope you could not reign as much as what you have deprived me of my life!"

Twelve days following his death, a harsh snowfall in Istanbul was considered Allah’s message to Osman that he killed his brother. Osman ordered Mehmed's execution before leaving the capital for the Polish campaign.

He was buried beside his father in his mausoleum located in Blue Mosque, Istanbul.

== In popular culture ==
In 2015 Turkish historical fiction TV series Muhteşem Yüzyıl: Kösem, Şehzade Mehmed is portrayed by Turkish actor Burak Dakak.

== Notes ==
1. "Twelve days following his death, a harsh snow fall in Istanbul which was considered as Allah’s message to Osman that he killed his brother." This part actually wrong. Turkish geologist and historian of science Celal Şengör saying "This winter is the part of the Little Ice Age, not because Şehzade Mehmed's curse."

For more information: Little Ice Age

== Sources ==
- Çiçek, Fikri (2014). An examination of daily politics and factionalism at the Ottoman Imperial court in relation to the regicide of Osman II (r. 1618-22). Istanbul Şehir University.
- Sakaoğlu, Necdet (2015). Bu Mülkün Sultanları. Alfa Yayıncılık. ISBN 978-6-051-71080-8.
