= Şehzade Süleyman =

Ottoman prince (1611/1612 or 1615–1635)

- Born: 1611/1612 or 1615; Topkapı Palace, Constantinople, Ottoman Empire
- Died: 27 July 1635 (aged 21–22); Topkapı Palace, Constantinople, Ottoman Empire
- Burial: Ahmed I Mausoleum, Blue Mosque, Constantinople
Names
- Turkish: Şehzade Süleyman bin Ahmed I Ottoman Turkish: شہزادہ سليمان
- Dynasty: Ottoman
- Father: Ahmed I
- Mother: Mahfiruz Hatun or Kösem Sultan
- Religion: Sunni Islam

Şehzade Süleyman (Ottoman Turkish: شهزاده سليمان; 1611/12 or 1615 – 27 July 1635) was an Ottoman prince, the son of Sultan Ahmed I.

== Life ==
Şehzade Süleyman was born in 1611/1612 or 1615 in Topkapı Palace to Sultan Ahmed I and Mahfiruz Hatun or Kösem Sultan.

After Murad IV’s accession in 1623, Süleyman was confined to the Kafes.

== Death ==
In 1635, Süleyman, and his brother Bayezid were executed during the celebrations over the victory at Erivan. The orders were given by Murad IV; the cause of Süleyman's execution is unknown. It was most likely that he was believed to have sided with Murad's opponents and rivals that wanted to overthrow him.

He was buried in the mausoleum of his father Ahmed I in the Blue Mosque near Topkapi Palace.
