= Murad IV =

Sultan of the Ottoman Empire from 1623 to 1640

- Kaysar-i Rum; Custodian of the Two Holy Mosques
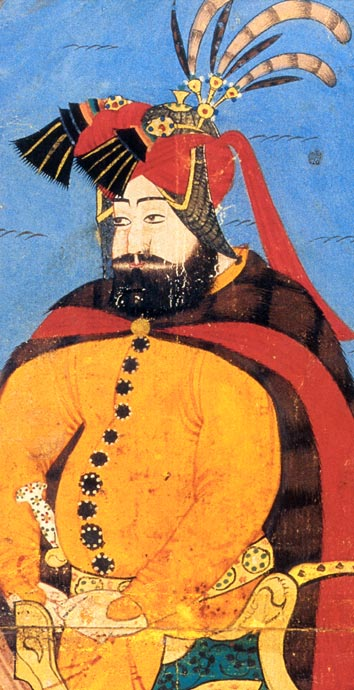
- Miniature of Murad IV, depicting him on his way to the Baghdad campaign, dressed in the armour of an Arab, c. 1623–1640, Topkapı Palace, Istanbul

Sultan of the Ottoman Empire (Padishah)
- Reign: 10 September 1623 – 8 February 1640
- Predecessor: Mustafa I
- Successor: Ibrahim
- Regent: Kösem Sultan (1623–1632)

Ottoman Caliph (Amir al-Mu'minin)
- Predecessor: Mustafa I
- Successor: Ibrahim
- Born: 27 July 1612; Topkapı Palace, Constantinople, Ottoman Empire
- Died: 8 February 1640 (aged 27); Constantinople, Ottoman Empire
- Burial: Sultan Ahmed Mosque, Constantinople, Ottoman Empire
- Consort: Ayşe Sultan others
- Issue Among others: Kaya Sultan; Safiye Sultan; Rukiye Sultan
Names
- Şah Murad bin Ahmed Han
- Dynasty: Ottoman
- Father: Ahmed I
- Mother: Kösem Sultan
- Religion: Sunni Islam
- Tughra

Murad IV (Ottoman Turkish: مراد رابع, Murād-ı Rābiʿ; Turkish: IV. Murad, 27 July 1612 – 8 February 1640) was the sultan of the Ottoman Empire from 1623 to 1640, known both for restoring the authority of the state and for the brutality of his methods. Murad IV was born in Constantinople, the son of Sultan Ahmed I (r. 1603–17) and Kösem Sultan. He was brought to power by a palace conspiracy when he was just 11 years old, and he succeeded his uncle, Mustafa I (r. 1617–18, 1622–23). Until he assumed absolute power on 18 May 1632, the empire was ruled by his mother, Kösem Sultan, as nāʾib-i salṭanat (regent). His reign is most notable for the Ottoman–Safavid War, of which the outcome would partition the Caucasus between the two Imperial powers for around two centuries, while it roughly laid the foundation for the current Turkey–Iran–Iraq borders.

== Early life ==
Murad IV was born on 27 July 1612 to Ahmed I (reign 1603 – 1617) and his consort and later wife, Kösem Sultan, an ethnic Greek. After his father's death when he was six years old, he was confined in the Kafes with his brothers, Suleiman, Kasim, Bayezid and Ibrahim.

Grand Vizier Kemankeş Ali Pasha and Şeyhülislam Yahya Efendi were deposed from their position. The next day, the child of the age of six was taken to the Eyüp Sultan Mausoleum. The swords of Muhammad and Yavuz Sultan Selim were bequeathed to him. Five days later, he was circumcised.

== Reign ==
=== Early reign (1623–1632) ===
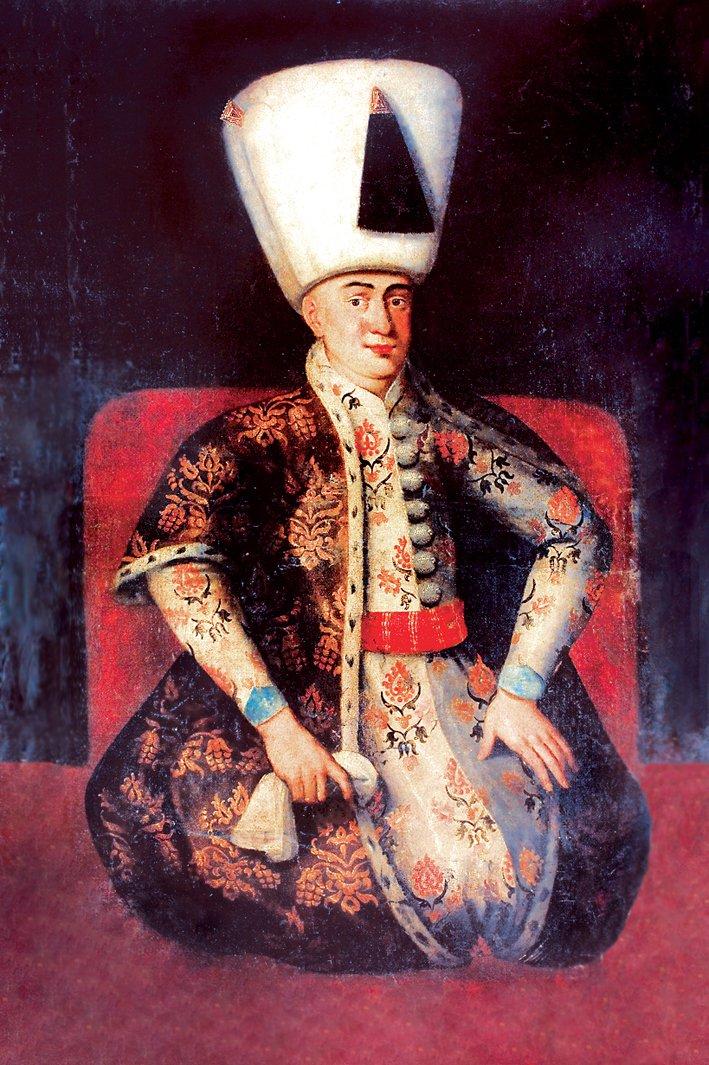
Murad IV in his young age

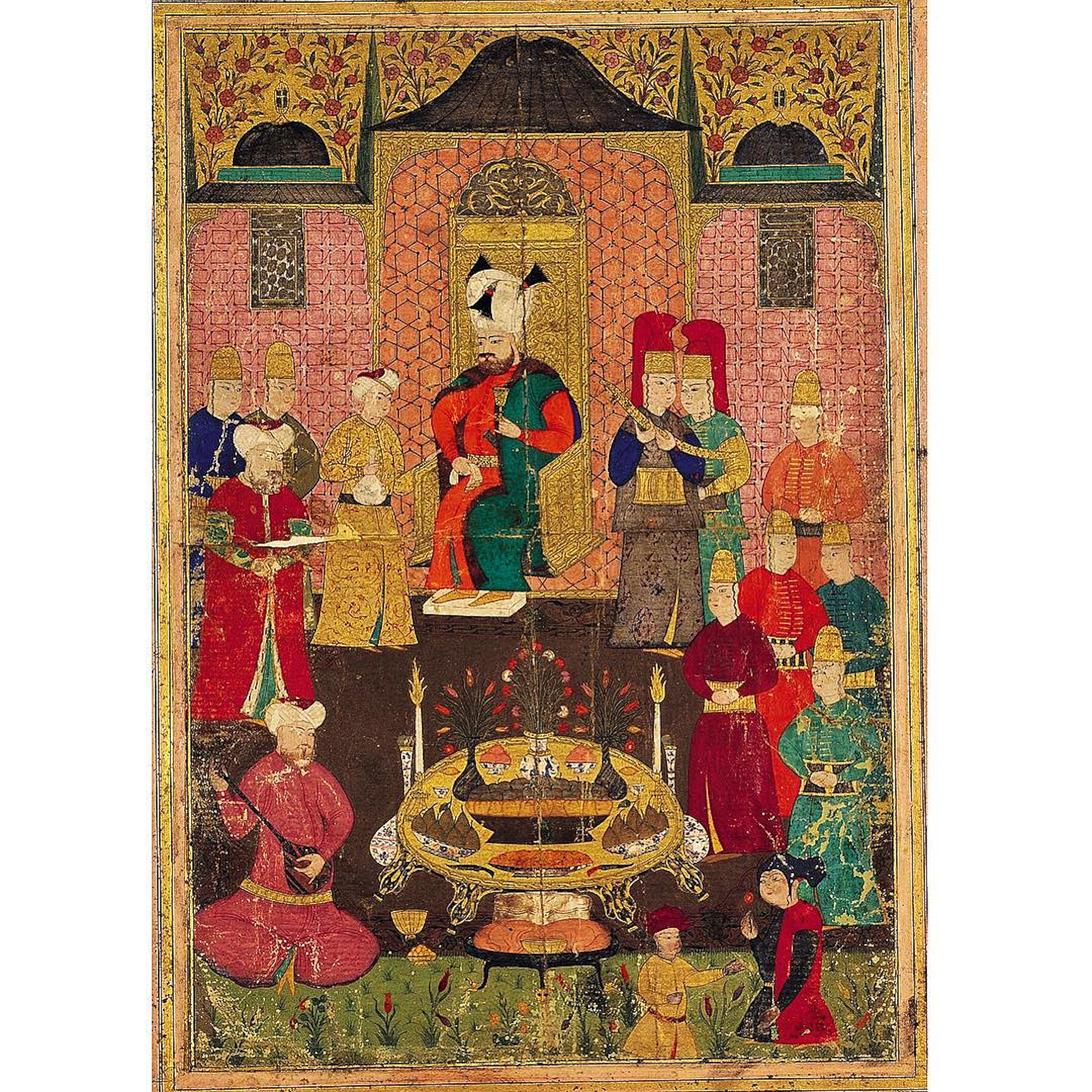
Ottoman miniature painting depicting Murad IV during dinner

Murad IV was for a long time under the control of his relatives, and during his early years as Sultan, his mother, Kösem Sultan, essentially ruled through him. In this period, the Safavid Empire invaded Ottoman Iraq, Northern Anatolia erupted in revolts, and in 1631, the Janissaries stormed the palace and killed the Grand Vizier, among others. Murad was deeply affected by this and swore to exact revenge.

At the age of 16 in 1628, he had his brother-in-law (his sister Fatma Sultan's husband, who was also the former governor of Egypt), Kara Mustafa Pasha, executed for a claimed action "against the law of God".

After the death of the Grand Vizier Çerkes Mehmed Pasha in the winter of Tokat, Diyarbekir Beylerbeyi Hafiz Ahmed Pasha became a vizier on 8 February 1625.

An epidemic, which started in the summer of 1625 and was called the plague of Bayrampaşa, spread to threaten the population of Constantinople. On average, a thousand people died every day. The people fled to the Okmeydanı to escape the plague. The situation was worse in the countryside outside of Constantinople.

=== Absolute rule and imperial policies (1632–1640) ===
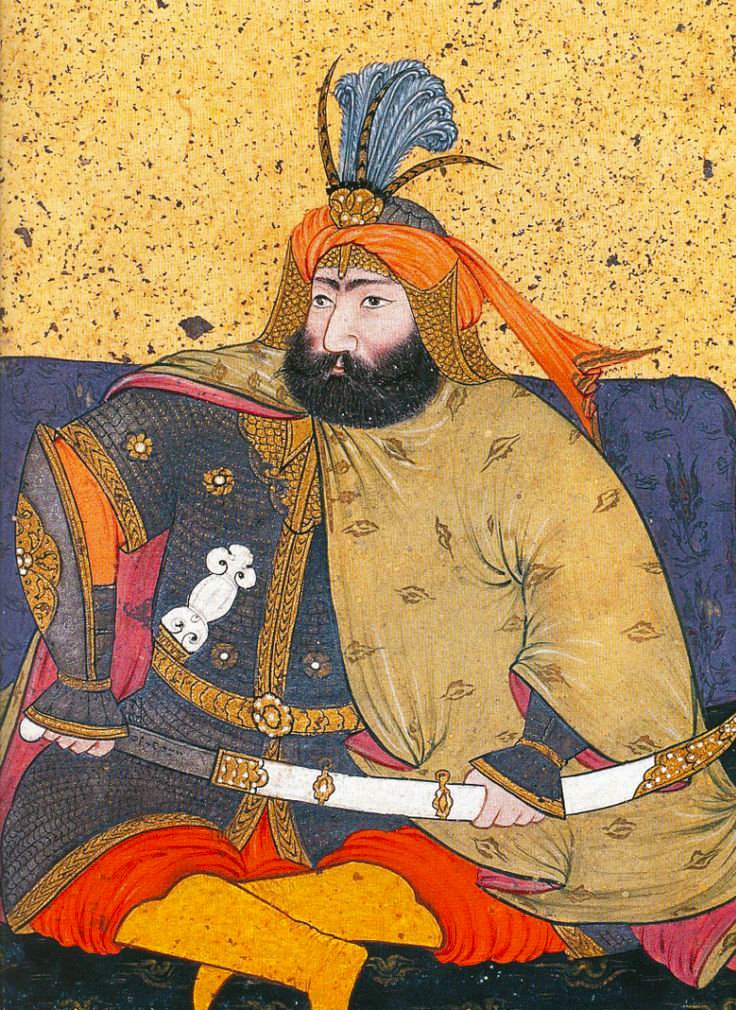
Portrait of Murad IV from the Kebir Musavver Silsilenâme, by Abdulcelil Levni, c. 1710–20

In 1632, Murad IV banned the smoking of tobacco and opium and closed coffee-houses, which were believed to be centers of sedition. Also in the same year, as noted by Dimitrie Cantemir, he legalized the selling and drinking of alcohol even for Muslims, an act which had no precedent at the time. Previously known to be fond of drinking, in 1634, he concluded that wine posed dangers and banned both the sale and drinking of alcohol and ordered taverns to close. He ordered execution for breaking this ban and restored the judicial regulations by very strict punishments, including execution; he once strangled a grand vizier for the reason that the official had beaten his mother-in-law. . Murad also once had the Sheikh-al-Islam executed for criticizing his execution of one of the Kadi (traditionally, the Ulama would be exiled instead of being subjected to capital punishment and Murad's actions were considered extreme) .

=== Fire of 1633 ===
On 2 September 1633, the Cibali fire broke out, burning a fifth of the city. The fire started during the day when a caulker burned a shrub and a ship caulked into the walls. The fire spread in three branches through the city. One arm lowered towards the sea. It returned from Zeyrek and walked to Atpazan. The most beautiful districts of Constantinople were ruined, from the Yeniodas, Mollagürani districts, Fener gate to Sultanselim, Mesihpaşa, Bali Pasha and Lutfi Pasha mosques, Şahı buhan Palace, Unkapanı to Atpazarı, Bostanzade houses, and Sofular Bazaar. The fire that lasted for 30 hours was only extinguished after the wind stopped.

=== War against Safavid Iran ===
Murad IV's reign is most notable for the war against Safavid Iran in which Ottoman forces managed to conquer Azerbaijan, occupying Tabriz, Hamadan, and capturing Baghdad in 1638. The Treaty of Zuhab that followed the war generally reconfirmed the borders as agreed by the Peace of Amasya, with Eastern Georgia, Azerbaijan, and Dagestan staying Iranian, and Western Georgia staying Ottoman. Mesopotamia was irrevocably lost for Iran. The borders fixed as a result of the war are more or less the same as the present border line between Iraq and Iran.

During the siege of Baghdad in 1638, the city held out for forty days but was compelled to surrender.

Murad IV himself commanded the Ottoman Army in the last years of the war.

=== Relations with the Mughal Empire ===
While he was encamped in Baghdad, Murad IV is known to have met ambassadors of the Mughal Emperor Shah Jahan, Mir Zarif and Mir Baraka, who presented 1000 pieces of finely embroidered cloth and even armor. Murad IV gave them the finest weapons, saddles and Kaftans and ordered his forces to accompany the Mughals to the port of Basra, where they set sail to Thatta and finally Surat.

=== Construction projects under him ===
Murad IV put emphasis on architecture, and in his period, many monuments were erected. The Baghdad Kiosk, built in 1635, and the Revan Kiosk, built in 1638 in Topkapı Palace, were both built in the local styles. Some of the others include the Kavak Sarayı pavilion; the Meydanı Mosque; the Bayram Pasha Dervish Lodge, Tomb, Fountain, and Primary School; and the Şerafettin Mosque in Konya.

== Music and poetry ==
Murad IV wrote many poems. He used the "Muradi" penname for his poems. He also liked testing people with riddles. Once he wrote a poetic riddle and announced that whoever came with the correct answer would get a generous reward. Cihadi Bey, a poet from Enderun School, gave the correct answer and was promoted.

Murad IV was also a composer. He has a composition called "Uzzal Peshrev".

== Family ==
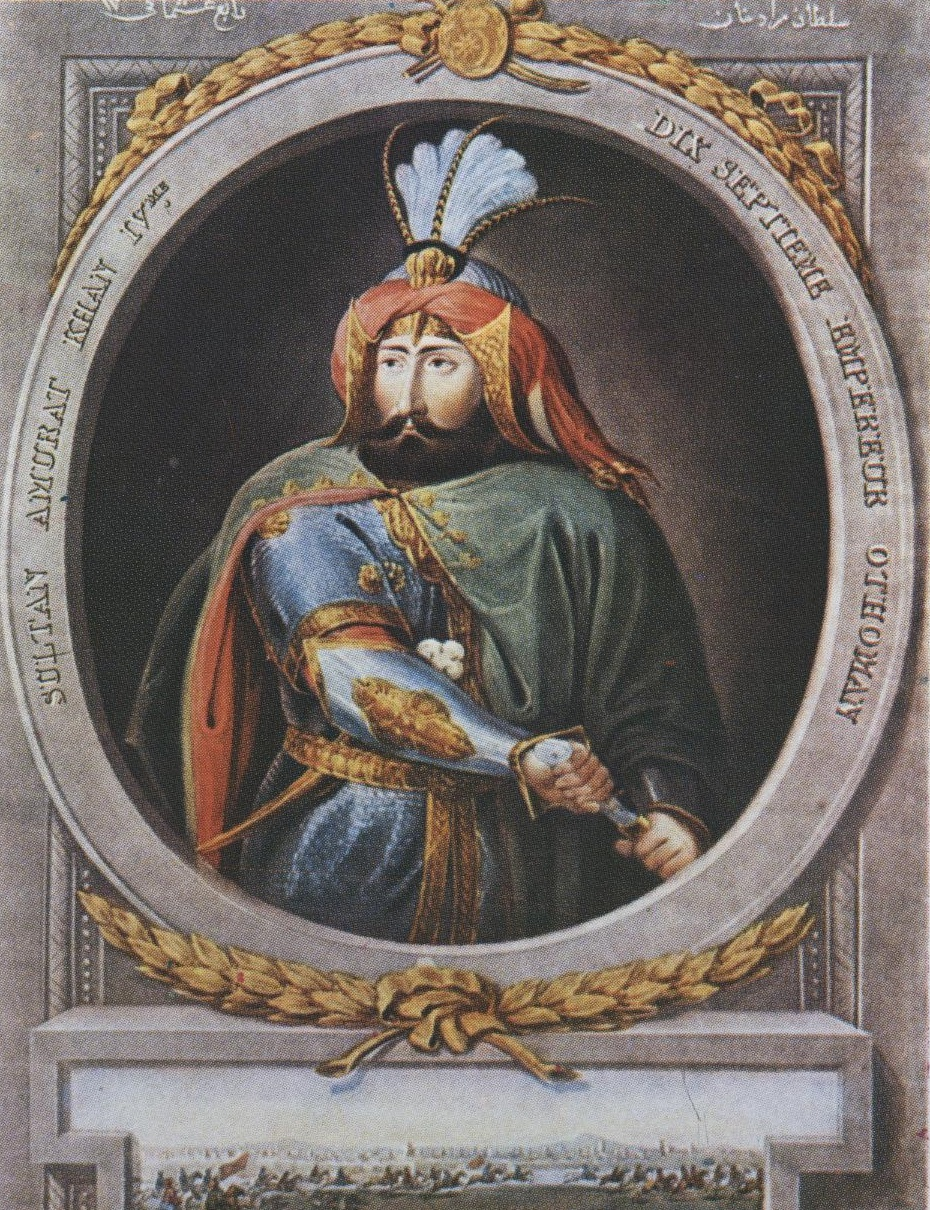
Murad IV, depicted posthumously by Konstantin Kapıdağlı, turn of the 18/19th century

Due to the fact that all of his sons died in infancy, Murad IV's family is not well known.

Only few of his many concubines are known and of the thirty-two children that Evliya Çelebi said that Murad IV had, five have not yet been identified, and the name of some of others is still unknown.

Furthermore, no child had a certain nominated mother.

=== Consorts ===
Murad IV had several consorts and concubines, but only few are known and some of them are disputed:

- Ayşe Sultan. Haseki Sultan of Murad IV and the only one whose title is confirmed.
- Unnamed Haseki Sultan (died after 1640). According to L. Pierce, Murad had a second Haseki Sultan in the last years of his reign. She started with a salary of 2,751 daily asprons, the highest ever recorded for a concubine, but after seven months it was reduced to 2,000 daily asprons, on par with Ayşe Sultan. She disappears from the records soon after Murad's death.
- Sanavber Hatun. She founded a charity in the capital in 1628.
- Safiye Hatun.

=== Sons ===
Murad IV had at least fifteen sons, but none of them survived infancy and all of them died before their father (who died in February 1640):

- Şehzade Ahmed (Constantinople, 21 December 1627 – Constantinople, 1637).
- Şehzade Fülan (Constantinople, March 1631 – Constantinople, March 1631). Buried in the Ahmed I mausoleum in the Blue Mosque.
- Şehzade Süleyman (Constantinople, February 1632 – Constantinople, 1632). Buried in the Ahmed I mausoleum in the Blue Mosque.
- Şehzade Mehmed (Constantinople, 8 August 1633 – Constantinople, 1638). Born in the Pavilion of the Kandilli Garden, buried in the Ahmed I mausoleum in the Blue Mosque.
- Şehzade Fülan (Constantinople, February 1634 – Constantinople, March 1634).
- Şehzade Fülan (Constantinople, 10 March 1634 – Constantinople, March 1634).
- Şehzade Alaeddin (Constantinople, 16 August 1635 – Constantinople, 1637). Buried in the Ahmed I mausoleum in the Blue Mosque.
- Şehzade Ahmed (Izmit, 15 May 1638 – 1639). He is referred to as "son of Haseki".
- Şehzade Abdülhamid (Constantinople, ? – Constantinople, ?). Buried in the Ahmed I mausoleum in the Blue Mosque.
- Şehzade Selim (Constantinople, ? – Constantinople, ?). Buried in the Ahmed I mausoleum in the Blue Mosque.
- Şehzade Orhan (Constantinople, ? – Constantinople, ?). Buried in the Ahmed I mausoleum in the Blue Mosque.
- Şehzade Numan (Constantinople, ? – Constantinople, ?). Buried in the Ahmed I mausoleum in the Blue Mosque.
- Şehzade Hasan (Constantinople, ? – Constantinople, ?). Buried in the Ahmed I mausoleum in the Blue Mosque.
- Şehzade Mahmud (Constantinople, ? – Constantinople, ?). Buried in the Ahmed I mausoleum in the Blue Mosque.
- Şehzade Osman (Constantinople, ? – Constantinople, ?). Buried in the Ahmed I mausoleum in the Blue Mosque.

=== Daughters ===
Murad IV had at least thirteen daughters.

Unlike their brothers, at least eight of them survived at least to the age of marriage:

- Fülane Sultan (Constantinople, 1627 – ?). She married Tüccarzade Mustafa Pasha in 1640.
- Gevherhan Sultan (Constantinople, February 1630 – ?). She married Haseki Mehmed Pasha.
- Hanzade Sultan (Constantinople, 1631 – ?, after 1657). She married Nakkaş Mustafa Pasha and was widowed in 1657.
- Ismihan Sultan (Constantinople, 1632 – Constantinople, 1632). Also called Esmihan Sultan.
- Ismihan Kaya Sultan (Constantinople, 1630/1633 – Constantinople, 28 February 1658). She married Melek Ahmed Pasha in 1644 and died in childbirth.
- Rabia Sultan (Constantinople, ? – Constantinople, ?). She lived to adulthood, although no marriages are known. Buried in the Ahmed I mausoleum in the Blue Mosque.
- Fatma Sultan (Constantinople, ? – Constantinople, ?). Buried in the Ahmed I mausoleum in the Blue Mosque.
- Bedia Sultan (Constantinople, ? – ?).
- Bedia Ayşe Sultan (Constantinople, ? – ?). She married Malatuk Süleyman Pasha before 1655.
- Hafsa Sultan (Constantinople, ? – ?). She married Ammarzade Mehmed Pasha.
- Safiye Sultan (Constantinople, after 1634 – Constantinople, c. 1670). She married firstly on 27 August 1649 to Hayderağazade Mehmed Pasha, married secondly Sarı Abaza Hüseyin Pasha (brother or son of Grand Vizier Siyavuş Pasha) in 1659. She had three sons and a daughter: Sultanzade Abubekr Bey, Sultanzade Mehmed Remzi Pasha (d. 21 November 1719), Sultanzade Abdüllah Bey (stillborn, c. 1670) and Rukiye Hanımsultan (died January 1697). She died to give birth to Abdüllah.
- Rukiye Sultan (Constantinople, 1640 – 1696). She married Şeytân Melek Ibrahim Pasha in 1663 and was widowed in 1685. She had two daughters: Fatma Hanımsultan (1677 – 1727) and Ayşe Hanımsultan (1680 – 1717). She was buried in the Şehzade Mosque.
- Esma Sultan (? – ?). She died in infancy.

== Death ==
Murad IV died from cirrhosis in Constantinople at the age of 27 in 1640. . Some sources also claim he died after battling Gout for many years.

Rumours had circulated that on his deathbed, Murad IV ordered the execution of his mentally disabled brother, Ibrahim (reigned 1640–48), which would have meant the end of the Ottoman line. However, the order was not carried out.

== In popular culture ==
- In the TV series Muhteşem Yüzyıl: Kösem, Murad IV is portrayed by Cağan Efe Ak as a child, and Metin Akdülger as the Sultan.
- In the film Three Thousand Years of Longing (2022), Murad IV is portrayed by Ogulcan Arman Uslu, with Kaan Guldur playing him as a child.

== See also ==
- Transformation of the Ottoman Empire
- Polish–Ottoman War (1633–34)
- Koçi Bey

Murad IV House of Osman Born: July 27, 1612 Died: February 8, 1640
Regnal titles
Preceded by Mustafa I	Sultan of the Ottoman Empire; 10 September 1623 – 9 February 1640 with Kösem Sultan (1623–1632)	Succeeded by İbrahim
Sunni Islam titles
Preceded by Mustafa I	Caliph; Ottoman Dynasty; 10 September 1623 – 9 February 1640	Succeeded by İbrahim
