= Ganizade Nadiri =

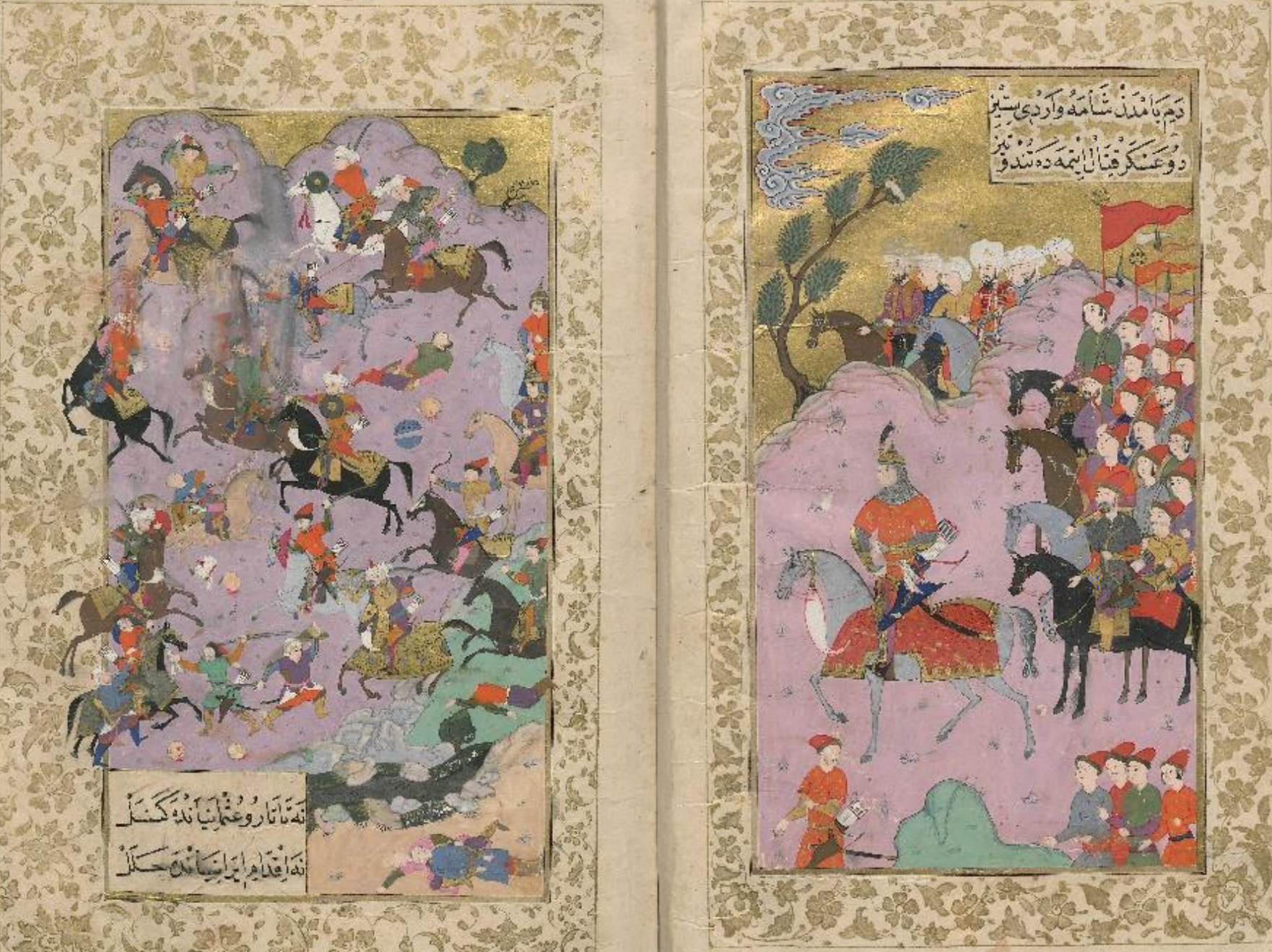
The Battle of Serav between Ottoman-Crimean and Safavid forces in 1618. The Tatar khan Cānbek Giray joins the battle under the command of Ottoman commander Ḫalīl Paşa, while the Safavids are commanded by Ḳārçıġāy Ḫan, Governor of Tabriz, under the orders of Şah ‘Abbās. (Şehnāme-i Nādirī, TPML, H. 1124, 18b-19a).

Ganizade Nadiri (Ghanīzāde Nādirī, Meḥemmed Nādirī b. ʿAbdülghanī b. Emīr Şāh b. Maḥmūd b. Bāyezīd, 1572–1626–7) was an Ottoman scholar, judge, poet, and calligrapher from Istanbul. His penname was Nadiri (Nādirī). His father Abdülgani (‘Abdülghanī) was an author, a teacher and judge, and his brother Abdülcebbar (ʿAbdülcebbār) was also a poet, his penname being Celili (Celīlī).

Ganizade first worked as a mülazim (teaching assistant) and a teacher (müderris) in Istanbul from 1591 to 1601. He became a judge from 1601, serving as judge of Thessaloniki, Cairo, Edirne, Istanbul, and Galata until 1609. He was then military judge (qāḍī-ʿasker) of Anatolia and then Rumelia from 1612 to 1624. He was close to the court throughout his career.

Ganizade mainly created two illustrated manuscripts: the Diwan-i Nadiri circa 1605 (Istanbul, Topkapı Sarayı Museum Library, H. 889), and the Şehnāme-i Nādirī (“Nadiri’s book of kings”) circa 1620 (Istanbul, Topkapı Sarayı Museum Library, H. 1124). The Divan contains thirty-seven eulogies of famous Ottoman potentates (viziers, bureaucrats, and scholars), as well as eulogies to the sultans Murad III (982–1003/1574–95), Mehmed III (r. 1003–12/1595–1603), Ahmed I, Mustafa I (r. 1026–7/1617–8 and 1031–2/1622–3) and Osman II.

== Sources ==
- Kuru, S. S. (2016). "Ganizade Nadiri". Encyclopaedia of Islam Three Online. Brill.
