= Abaza rebellion =

Uprising in the Ottoman Empire

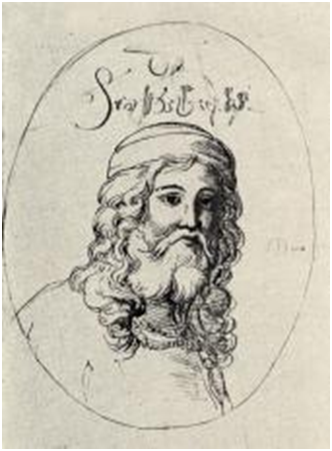
Abaza Mehmed Paşa

The Abaza rebellion was a group of uprisings that occurred in the 17th century in the Ottoman Empire during the reigns of Mustafa I (1622–23) and Murat IV (1623–40). The name of the rebellion refers to Abaza Mehmet (or Abaza for short), an Ottoman pasha of Abkhazian origin. Sometimes, this event is considered as a part of the Jelali revolts. But unlike the other Jelali revolts the principal reason of the Abaza rebellion was the resentment towards the janissary corps.

== Background ==
The Ottoman sultan Osman II (1618–1622), who laid a siege on Khotyn (in modern Ukraine, then a part of Polish–Lithuanian Commonwealth), could not capture the city. He blamed the unruly janissaries for the failure. The janissaries, once elite troops of the Ottoman Empire, had been corrupted during the stagnation era of the empire. Osman planned to create a new army based on Turkmens of Anatolia. Energetic but young and inexperienced, Osman II revealed his intent. This caused a janissary revolt in the capital Constantinople. Osman was imprisoned and later assassinated by the supporters of the rebels on 20 May 1622. This assassination caused a great shock in the Ottoman lands.

== First rebellion ==
Abaza Mehmet was the governor of Erzurum. According to historian Joseph von Hammer-Purgstall, he was a consultant of Osman II in his efforts to abolish the janissaries. Shortly after hearing the news about the assassination, he began expelling and even killing the janissaries on duty in his province. Although he was formally dismissed by the Ottoman Porte (government) on 17 November 1622, he continued to stay in Erzurum and claimed that he was loyal to the Porte but he was trying to punish those who were responsible for the assassination. The Turkmen people of Central Anatolia, who were also accusing the janissaries, readily accepted his cause and soon he began controlling most of Eastern and Central Anatolia.

In 1624, finally the Porte decided to fight against Abaza's forces. Commander (Turkish: serdar) of the army was Hafız Ahmet Pasha. The clash took place in the plains near Kayseri on 16 August 1624. During the battle, some troops in Abaza's army changed sides and Abaza's forces were defeated. Abaza escaped to Erzurum, and during the ensuing talks he was able to convince the Porte of his good intentions. Thus he continued as the governor.

== Second rebellion ==
During the Ottoman–Safavid War (1623–1639), the Safavid (Persian) army was threatening the Ottoman city Ahıska (modern Akhaltsikhe in Georgia) in August 1627. Abaza was ordered to support the Ottoman army. Although Abaza asked for the commandship of the army, he was refused. He began to move his troops to the battleground. However, instead of supporting the army, he waited for a suitable moment to raid the Ottoman army. The raid was successful. In addition to janissaries, many Ottoman pashas were killed.

Upon this humiliating defeat, the Grand vizier Halil Pasha was dismissed. The new grand vizier became Gazi Hüsrev Pasha. In September 1628, Hüsrev Pasha laid a siege on Erzurum. He had cannons at his disposal. On 18 September 1628, Abaza decided to give up. Hüsrev Pasha accepted his terms. Thus, he was not punished; but he was assigned to govern in one of the European provinces of the Empire, where he had no local support.

== See also ==
- Abaza Hasan Pasha
