= Siege of Baghdad (1630) =

Part of the Ottoman–Safavid War (1623–1639)

- Part of Ottoman–Safavid War (1623–1639)
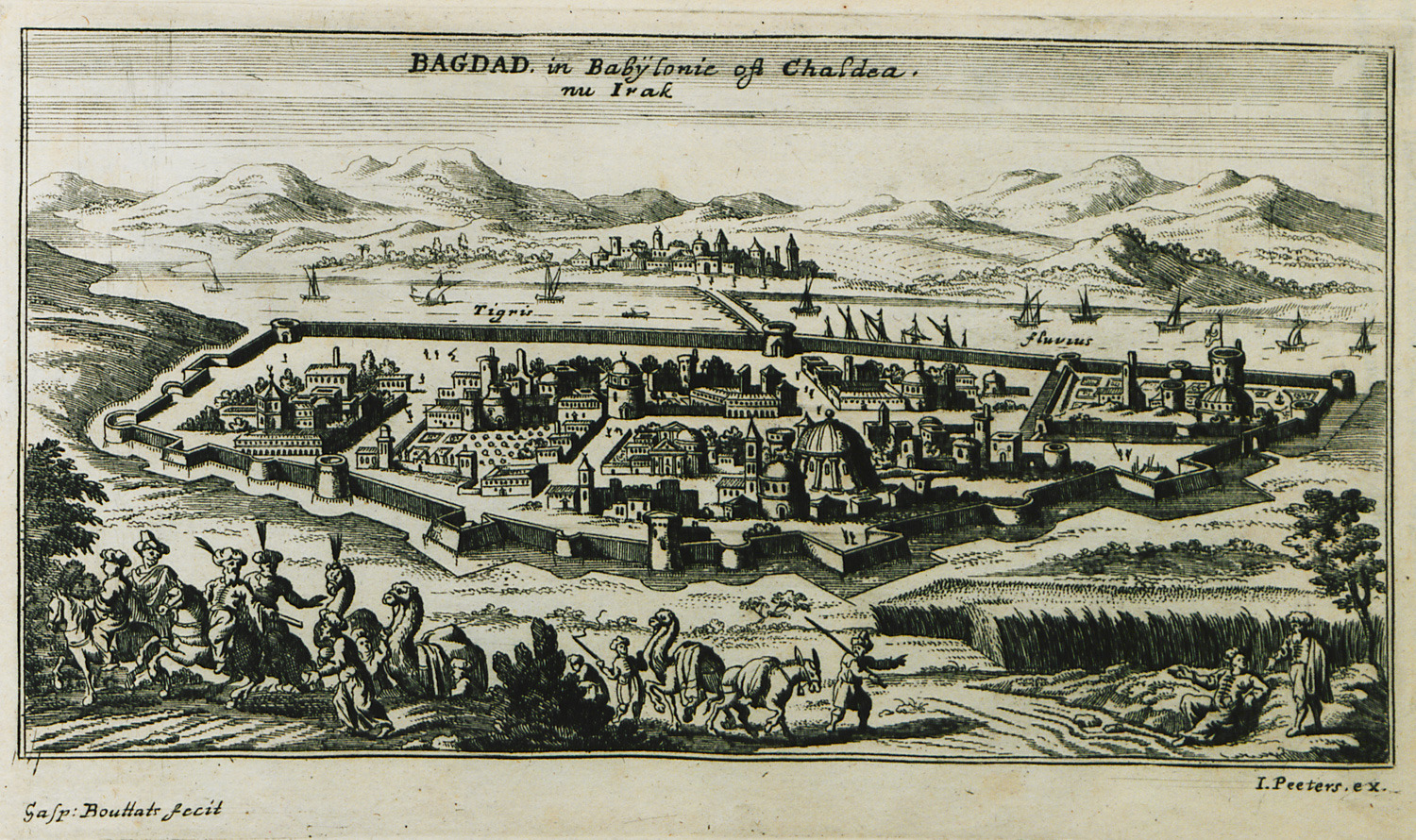
- Illustration of Baghdad by Jacob Balthasar Peeters late 17th century
Date	6 October – 14 November 1630
Location	Baghdad, Mesopotamia
Result	Safavid victory
Territorial changes	Withdrawal of Ottomans forces

Belligerents
Safavid Iran	Ottoman Empire

Commanders and leaders
Shah Safi	Gazi Hüsrev Pasha

Casualties and losses
Unknown	Heavy losses

The siege of Baghdad (Persian: محاصره بغداد) was the second attempt of the Ottoman Empire to recapture Baghdad. The Ottoman army under the command of Gazi Hüsrev Pasha besieged Baghdad, which had fallen to Iran in 1623, for the second time after the unsuccessful siege in 1625-26, but could not recapture it after a 39-day siege.

== Background ==
In 1630, after the unsuccessful siege of 1625-1626, the Ottoman Empire began preparations for a second campaign to recapture Baghdad, which had been held by the Safavids since 1623.

== Siege ==
The Ottoman army reached the Dertenk Strait around the middle of August, however, it could not start the siege quickly. This was because it took three weeks for the supply ships, which could only move with difficulty in the Tigris, whose waters had receded due to the dry season, to bring the necessary cannon, ammunition, and grain from Mosul. The siege was started on October 5, 1630, when Serasker Süleyman Pasha, who came from Istanbul with reinforcements, joined the army, and the soldiers entered the excavated metris. 500 cannonballs were fired daily at the castle, which was surrounded from all sides. When the few raids that the Castle Commander Safi Han had the Safavid troops do posed a danger to the Ottoman troops, Gazi Hüsrev Pasha moved the tents closer to the metris so that the reinforcements could respond more quickly. In return, the tents came within range of the Persian artillery. The approach of the tents allowed the watchmen in the castle to observe the activities of the sappers, and 17 sapper attempts were prevented by the Safavids. After the Sultan Süleyman tower of the Baghdad Castle was severely damaged by the intense artillery fire of the Ottoman army, the attack was finally launched on October 10. In this general attack, which was initially successful, 400-500 soldiers entered Narinkale and managed to plant a flag on the walls. However, as the ruins they climbed up collapsed and no reinforcements came after them, they were all put to the sword. The Ottoman fleet also attacked simultaneously from the Tigris with eight ships. However, due to the shallow waters (similar to the difficulties experienced in supplying from Mosul), these ships ran aground before reaching the coast. The ships, which became an easy target, were exposed to intense fire from the castle and all the soldiers on board were destroyed. In this general attack, which resulted in heavy losses, commanders such as Zor Pasha, Genç Osman and Küçük Abaza also died. In the meantime, a Safavid unit under the command of Khan Ahmed captured the Mihriban and Pelengan castles, forcing Arnavutoğlu Mustafa Pasha to retreat to Shahrizor. Arnavutoğlu Mustafa Pasha immediately informed Gazi Hüsrev Pasha of the situation, and reported that Khan Ahmed was preparing to march on Shahrizor with a Safavid army of 30,000 men under the command of Tohta Khan, and requested urgent help. Due to the failure of the attack on October 10, the decrease in grain and ammunition, and the danger to the north of the army from Shahrizor, Gazi Hüsrev Pasha lifted the siege on 14 November 1630. and On October 25, 1631, he was dismissed from office.

== Sources ==
- IRAQ iv. RELATIONS IN THE SAFAVID PERIOD, Encyclopaedia Iranica. "Welcome to Encyclopaedia Iranica".
- Pirnia, Hasan; Ashtiani, Abbas Iqbal; Babaei, Parviz (2012). History of Persia (in Persian). Negah Publications. ISBN 978-9643513320.
