= Ahmed Nakşi =

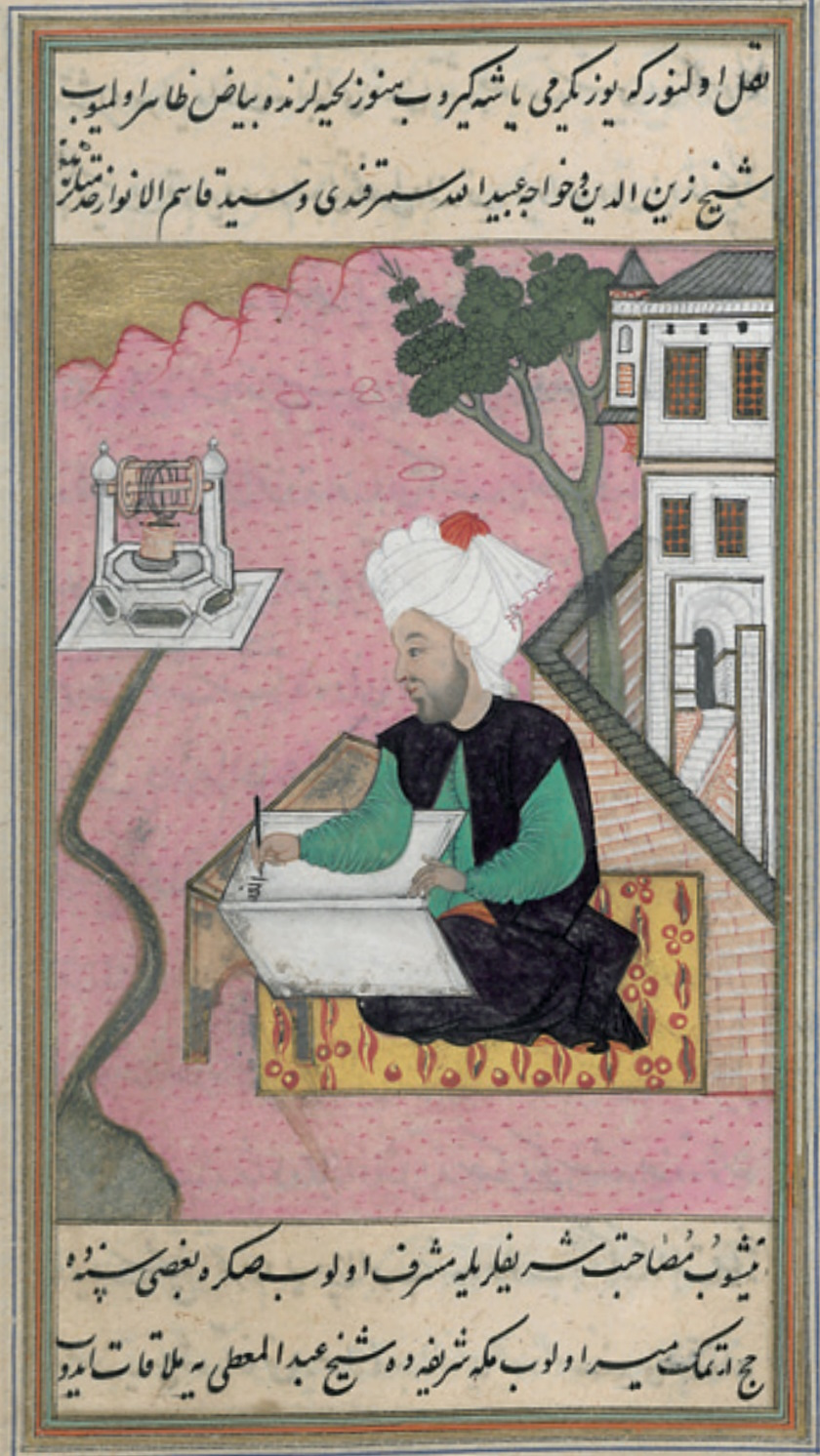
Abdürrahim Rumi Merzifoni (d.1465), painted by Ahmed Nakşi, Sekayik-i Numaniye (TSMK, H. 1263)

Ahmed Nakşi (flourished 1619–22) was an Ottoman miniature painter and astrologer of the 17th century. He was the official timekeeper at the Süleymaniye Mosque in Istanbul, and the lead miniature painter for historical manuscripts during the reign of Sultan Osman II (r. 1618–22).

== Career ==
He contributed the 49 illustrations of several historical works, particularly the Sekayik-i Numaniye (Topkapi Palace Museum, H 1263), a biographical dictionary of Ottoman scholars written by Taşköprülüzade Ahmed Efendi and commissioned in 1619 by the grand vizier Öküz Mehmed Pasha for the Sultan. In the last scene of this work, Osman II appears with his Grand Vizier who offers him the manuscript, in the presence of Ahmed Naksi himself. He also contributed to the Diwan-i Nadiri (Topkapi Palace Museum, H 819) and the Shahname-i Nadiri (Topkapi Palace Museum, H. 1124) which deal with the conquest of Hotin by Osman II.

Stylistically, Ahmed Nakşi depicted highly individualized figures, and made some attempts at depth and perspective. His style was quite influential in the 17th and 18th centuries.

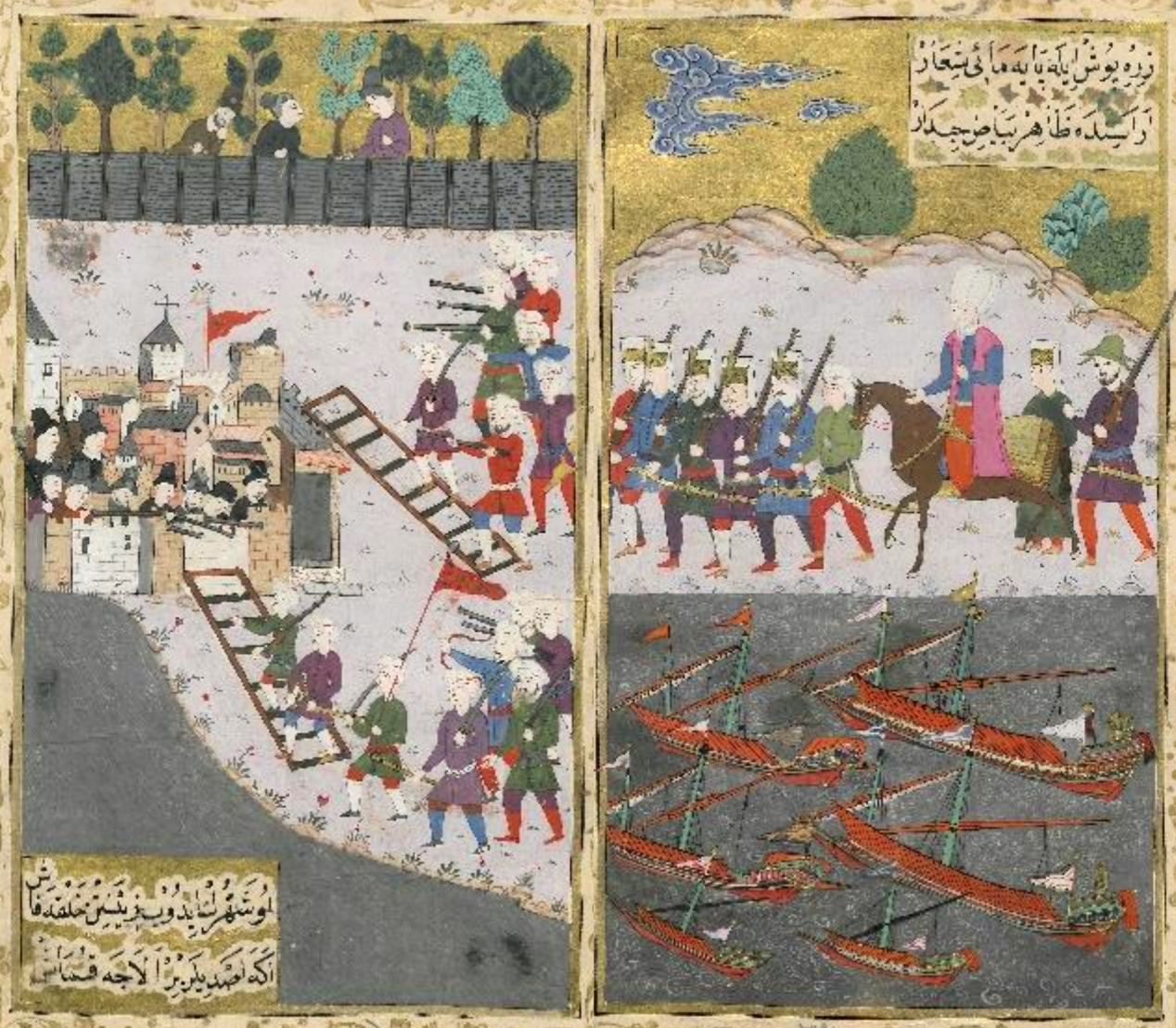
Halil Pasha's Sack of Manfredonia. Şehnāme-i Nādirī

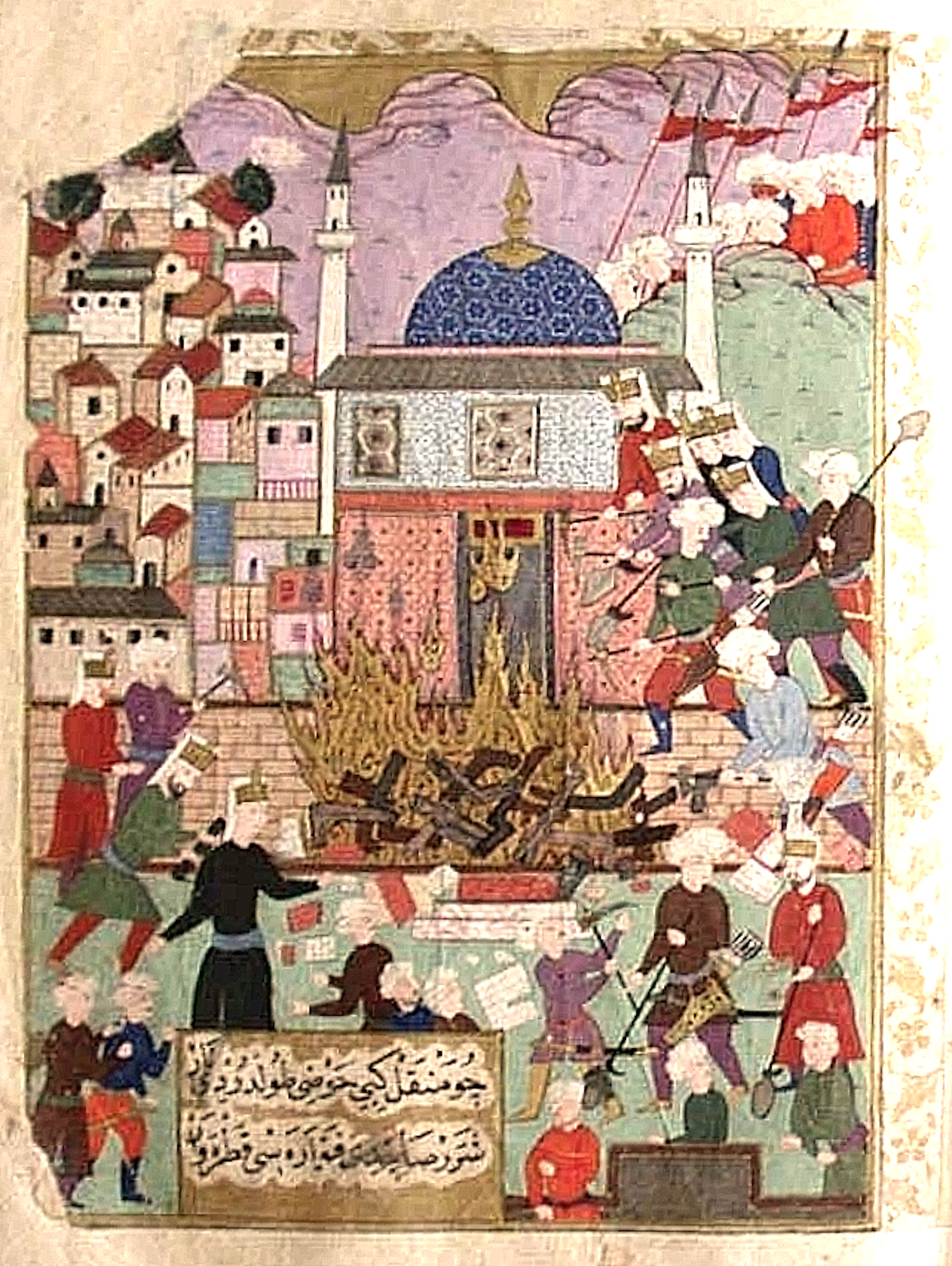
Capture of Tabriz in 1618, by Damat Halil Pasha. Şehnāme-i Nādirī

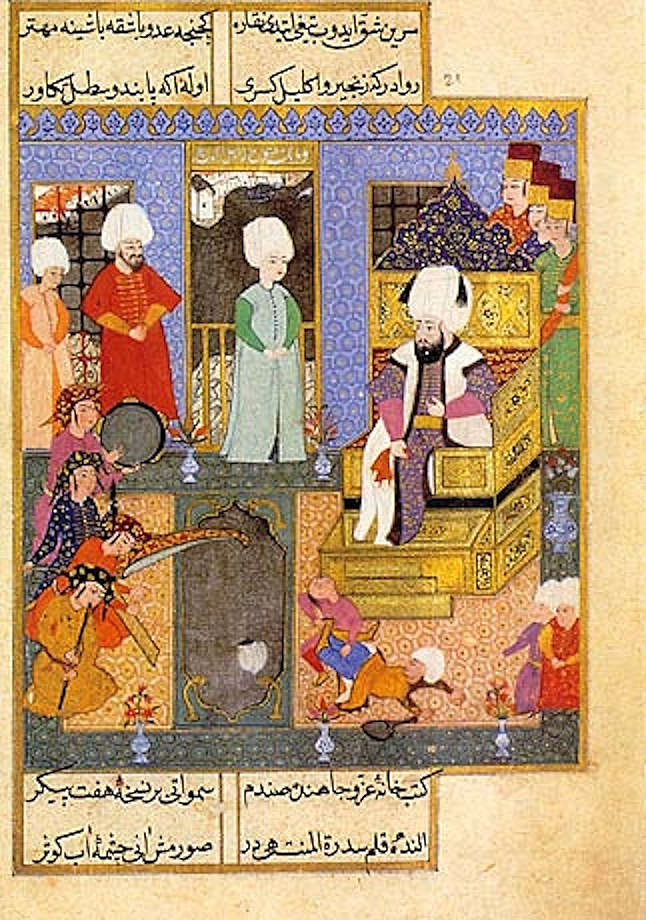
Mehmed III entertained at the shore pavilion. Diwan-i Nadiri, c. 1605. Topkapi Palace Museum Library H.889.

== Sources ==
- Atil, Esin (1973). Exhibition catalogue of Turkish art of the Ottoman period (PDF). Washington D.C.: Freer Gallery of Art, Smithsonian Institution.
- Bloom, Jonathan; Blair, Sheila (14 May 2009). Grove Encyclopedia of Islamic Art & Architecture: Three-Volume Set. OUP USA. ISBN 978-0-19-530991-1.
