= Ottoman–Safavid War (1616–1618) =

War between the Ottoman Empire and Safavid Iran

Ottoman–Safavid War of 1616–1618
- Part of Ottoman–Persian Wars
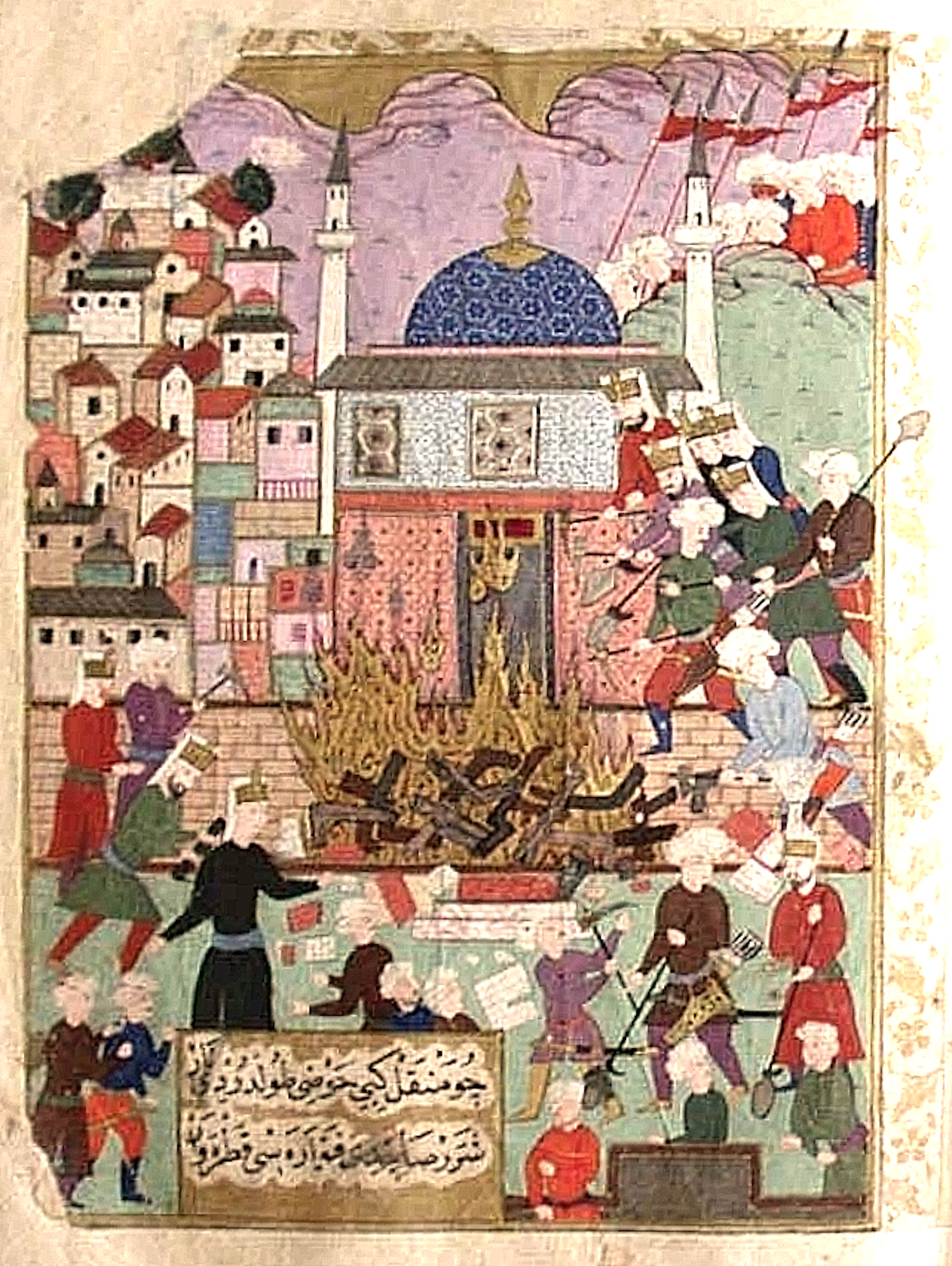
- Capture and pillage of Tabriz in 1618 by the Ottomans under Damat Halil Pasha. Şehname-i Nadiri (Nadiri's book of kings) (1620s).
Date	August 1616 – 26 September 1618
Location	South Caucasus
Result	Safavid victory; Treaty of Serav

Belligerents
Safavid Iran	Ottoman Empire; Bukhara Khanate

Commanders and leaders
(Safavid Iran) Abbas the Great (Safavid Iran) Qarachaqay Khan	(Ottoman Empire) Ahmed I # (Ottoman Empire) Mustafa I (Ottoman Empire) Osman II (Ottoman Empire) Öküz Mehmed Pasha (Ottoman Empire) Damat Halil Pasha; Imam Quli Khan; Mohammad Qoli Durman

Strength
Unknown	50,000

Casualties and losses
Unknown	15,000

The Ottoman–Safavid War of 1616–1618 was a brief war between the Ottoman Empire and Safavid Iran.

After the Ottoman–Safavid war (1603–1612), the Ottomans and Safavids had signed the Treaty of Nasuh Pasha, in which their borders were changed back to the previous one under Selim I and Shah Ismail I. In exchange, the Safavid ruler Shah Abbas I promised to send the Ottomans 200 pack-loads of silk each year. In 1616, the Ottomans used the Safavids' failure to deliver the silk as a pretext to start another war. At the end of August 1616, a sizable Ottoman army led by the grand vizier Öküz Mehmed Pasha besieged Erivan. Abbas harassed the Ottoman supply lines, and by the time winter was nearing, Mehmed Pasha ended the siege and retreated, leading to death of many of soldiers due to the cold weather. Due to his setback, he was replaced by Damat Halil Pasha as the new grand vizier. In 1618, with the assistance of Tatar and Georgian warriors, Halil Pasha launched another Ottoman invasion into Iran.

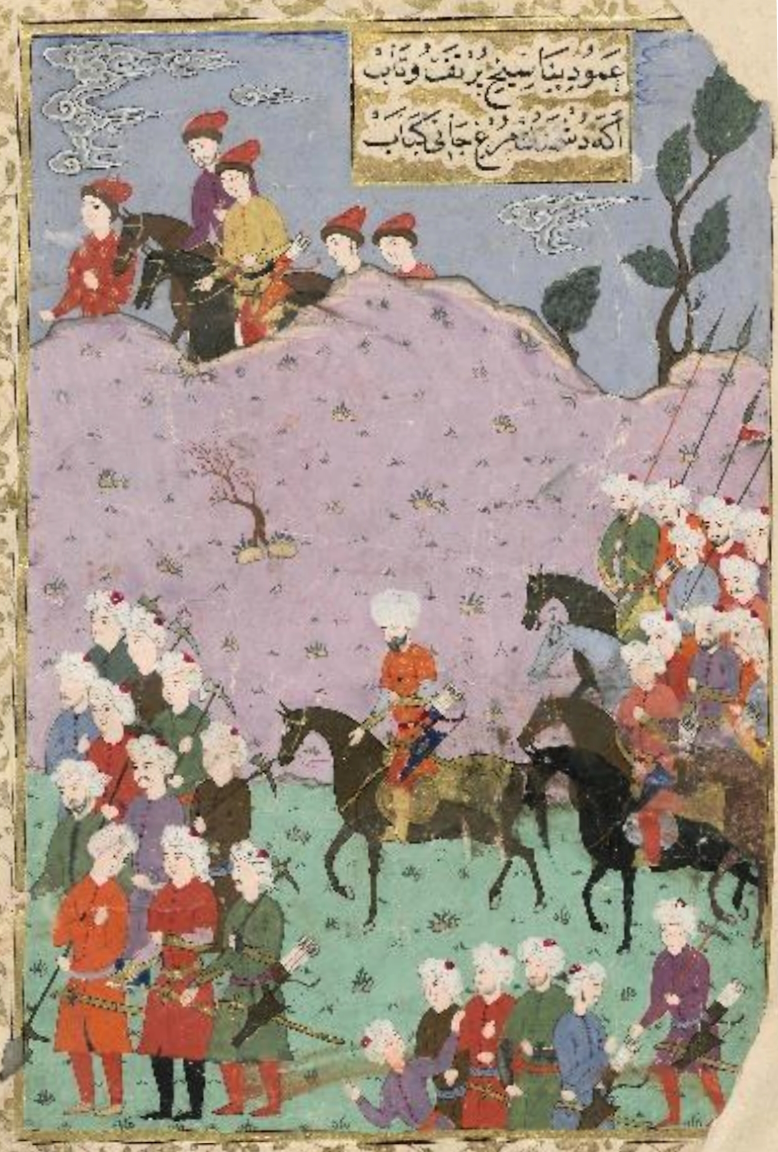
Grand Vizier Damat Halil Pasha and his troops, sent to fight Shah Abbas of Persia in 1618.

He dispatched an emissary to Abbas in Qazvin with the prospect of withdrawing if the Safavids gave back the lands they had conquered. Abbas rejected the offer and marched to the Azerbaijan province to confront the invading Ottoman army. He marched to the Safavid shrine city of Ardabil with a portion of the army, and there he rejected another Ottoman emissary. Even after the emissary dropped the territorial demands and urged Abbas only to pay the silk tribute and surrender his son to Istanbul as a hostage, he refused to consider a peace proposal.

Abbas' new commander-in-chief, Qarachaqay Khan, an Armenian gholam, was given orders to raze the countryside and target enemy gathering groups while avoiding a major battle until the winter was upon them and the Ottomans were starving and cold.

In 1618, the Ottomans and Safavids made peace by signing the Treaty of Serav which reaffirmed the terms of the previous peace treaty.

== Events ==
Shah Abbas I marched into the northern provinces of Azerbaijan and Georgia in October 1613. The consolidation of the Safavid state in the South Caucasus caused concern in the Ottoman court. Shah Abbas I's failure to send the 200 taels of silk that he was supposed to give to the Ottomans in accordance with the Istanbul Peace Treaty also strained Safavid-Ottoman relations. The Shah's detention of an Ottoman envoy who had come to negotiate with the Safavid state for nearly two years and his refusal to allow him to return also had a negative impact on relations with the Ottomans.

Shah Abbas I sent his envoy to Sultan Ahmed I with gifts to prevent a breach of peace. However, the Ottoman sultan decided to start a war. Shah Abbas I sent 200 taels of silk to the Ottoman court with Qasim Khan, but the sultan did not change his decision. The next Safavid envoy sent was arrested and imprisoned. Thus, in April 1616, the Ottoman army, led by the Grand Vizier Qara Mehmet Pasha, began its march from Erzurum. In August 1616, the Iravan fortress was besieged by an Ottoman army of a hundred thousand. Shah Abbas I did not engage in a decisive battle with the Ottomans. He decided to prevent the Ottoman army from receiving supplies, block its way back, and strike with surprise attacks by surrounding it. The prolongation of the siege, the Ottoman army's difficulties with food and ammunition, and the harshness of the winter forced Mehmet Pasha to send an envoy to Shah Abbas I. The siege was lifted on November 5, and the Ottomans suffered heavy losses in their retreat.

Shah Abbas again resorted to old methods to disrupt further Ottoman advances. The Safavid army, led by Qarchiqay Khan, crossed Erzurum and Van and evacuated these regions. Halil Pasha's forces, preparing to march on Azerbaijan, were forced to retreat to Diyarbakır for the winter.

The army of Grand Vizier Halil Pasha set out again for Tabriz in 1618. Qarchigai Khan evacuated Tabriz, and Shah Abbas himself evacuated Ardabil. The Ottoman army entered the empty city of Tabriz without a fight.

Shah Abbas I was leading the Ottoman army along difficult roads in the evacuated regions, tiring them out. Halil Pasha's 50,000-strong army, exhausted on the roads, encountered the Shah's army at the Broken Bridge between Arashdaban and Sagamchay. Hasan Pasha was killed in the battle. The Crimean Khan, Janibey Geray, managed to escape; his vizier Mirza Bey and the Van beylerbey Muhammad Pasha were captured. The Ottoman army suffered about 15,000 casualties.

== Aftermath ==
The decisive battle between the Safavids and the Ottoman army took place on September 10, 1618, at a place called Sinig Korpu. The Ottoman army suffered a heavy defeat, losing 15,000 soldiers. In the battle, the Beylerbey of Erzurum, Hasan Pasha, was killed, the Beylerbey of Van, Mehmed Pasha, and the chief vizier of the Crimean Khan, Mirza Bey, were captured. Canibey escaped and saved his life.

After this defeat, Damat Halil Pasha withdrew and began peace negotiations. On September 26, 1618, a peace treaty was signed between Osman II and Shah Abbas I in Marand. The main difference of this peace from the Second Istanbul Peace of 1612 was the reduction of the annual silk tribute from 200 taels to 100. On September 29, 1619, the Ottoman Sultan Osman II ratified the Safavid-Ottoman peace treaty and set out on a campaign in Europe. Shah Abbas violated the Safavid-Ottoman peace treaty of 1618. In the 1620s, chaos began in the Ottoman Empire. The Janissaries were acting arbitrarily in the country, overthrowing sultans from power and replacing them with others. Taking advantage of this, Shah Abbas captured the Iraqi Arab cities of Baghdad, Karbala, Najaf, Mosul and Kirkuk in 1622–1623. Shortly afterwards, the fortress of Akhaltsikhe, which had remained in Ottoman hands under the 1618 treaty, was also captured.

== Sources ==
- Blow, David (2009). Shah Abbas: The Ruthless King Who Became an Iranian Legend. I. B. Tauris. ISBN 978-1-84511-989-8. LCCN 2009464064.
- Mikaberidze, Alexander (2011). Conflict and Conquest in the Islamic World: A Historical Encyclopedia [2 volumes]. ABC-CLIO. ISBN 978-1598843361.
- Süleymanov, Nizami (2018). A Z Ə R B A Y C A N SƏFƏVİ DÖVLƏTİ 1501- 1736-cı illər. Bakı: “İqtisad Universiteti” Nəşriyyatı. pp. 214 səh. ISBN 978-9952-34-620-6.
- Ateş, Sabri (2013). Ottoman-Iranian Borderlands: Making a Boundary, 1843-1914. Cambridge University Press.
