= Treaty of Serav =

1618 treaty between the Ottoman Empire and Persia

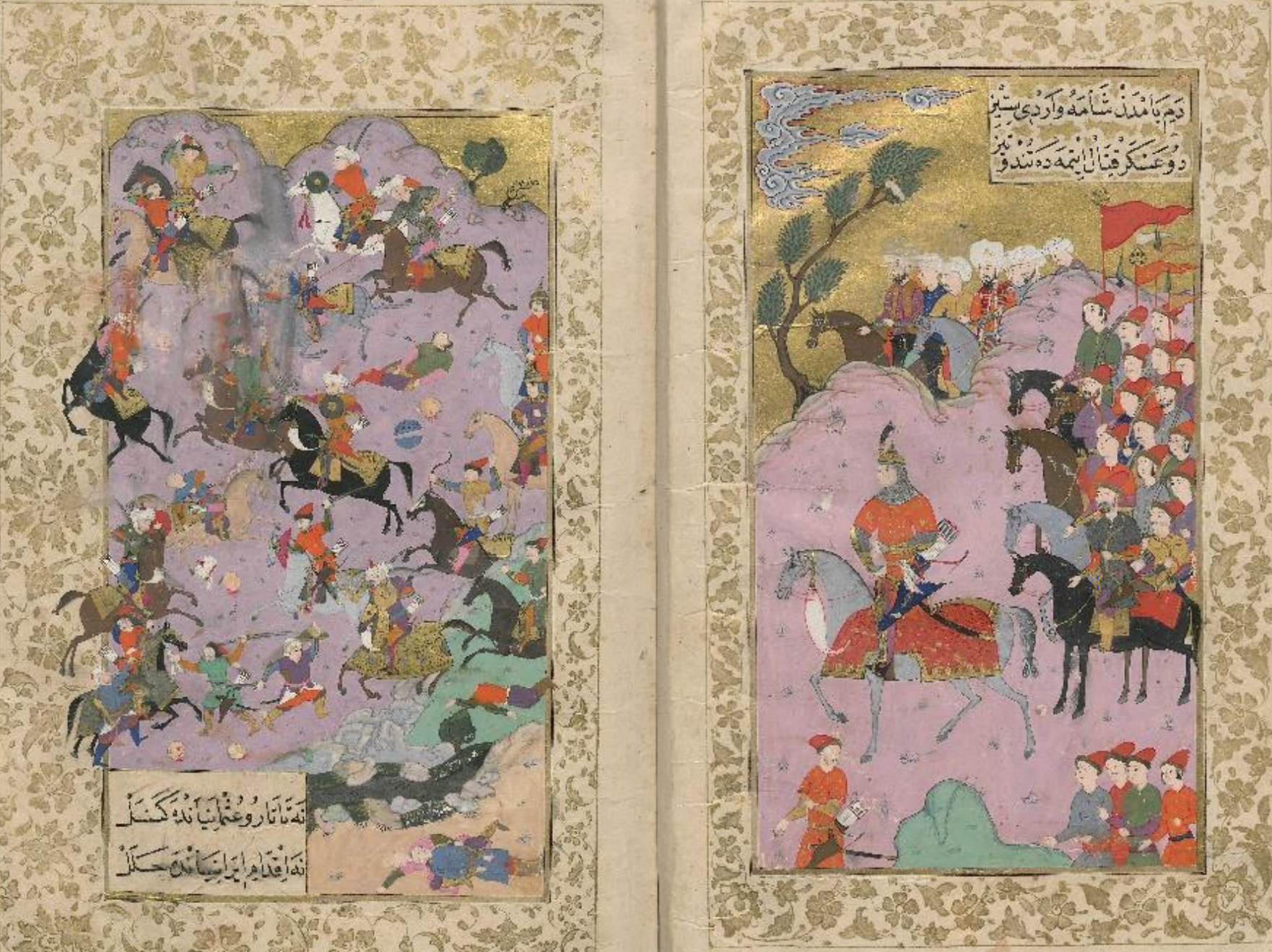
The battle of Serav between Ottoman-Crimean and Safavid forces in 1618. The Tatar khan Cānbek Giray joins the battle under the command of Ottoman commander Ḫalīl Paşa, while the Safavids are commanded by Ḳārçıġāy Ḫan, Governor of Tabriz, under the orders of Şah ‘Abbās. (Shahname-i Nadiri, TPML, H. 1124, 18b-19a).

Treaty of Serav (Persian: عهدنامه سراب, Turkish: Serav Antlaşması) was a treaty between Ottoman Empire and Safavid Persia after the Ottoman–Safavid War (1616–1618) (signed on 26 September 1618 in Sarab).

== Background ==
By the treaty of Nasuh Pasha in 1612 Ottoman Empire had agreed to turn back Caucasus and Northwest Iran to Safavid Persia. Safavid Empire on the other hand agreed to pay an annual tribute of 200 loads of silk as a part of reparations. However, Shah Abbas I the Great of Persia refused to pay the tribute. The war renewed in 1615.

== The war ==
The Ottoman commander in chief Grand Vizier Öküz Kara Mehmed Pasha tried to capture Yerevan (modern Armenia) which was recently abandoned by the treaty of Nasuh Pasha, but he lifted the siege after 44 days as no improvements were booked. The target of the next commander in chief Damat Halil Pasha was Ardabil. This time Abbas sued for peace.

== The terms ==
The terms of the treaty was similar to those of treaty of Nasuh Pasha with several minor rectifications of the border line. Also, the annual tribute of the Persian side was reduced from 200 loads to 100 loads.

== Aftermath ==
This treaty proved that a stalemate between Ottoman Empire and Safavid Persia had been reached and neither side might gain substantial territories in the long run. In the following decades there were times when the Ottomans succeeded to storm Tabriz, and there were times when the Persians successfully captured Baghdad. But these victories were all temporary and the balance of power between the two states continued up to the 20th century.

== See also ==
- Treaty of Zuhab
- Treaty of Kerden

== Sources ==
- Ateş, Sabri (2013). Ottoman-Iranian Borderlands: Making a Boundary, 1843-1914. Cambridge University Press.
- Bläsing, Uwe; Arakelova, Victoria; Weinreich, Matthias, eds. (2015). Studies on Iran and The Caucasus: In Honour of Garnik Asatrian. Brill.
- Blow, David (2009). Shah Abbas: The Ruthless King Who Became an Iranian Legend. I.B. Tauris.
