= Diwan-i Nadiri =

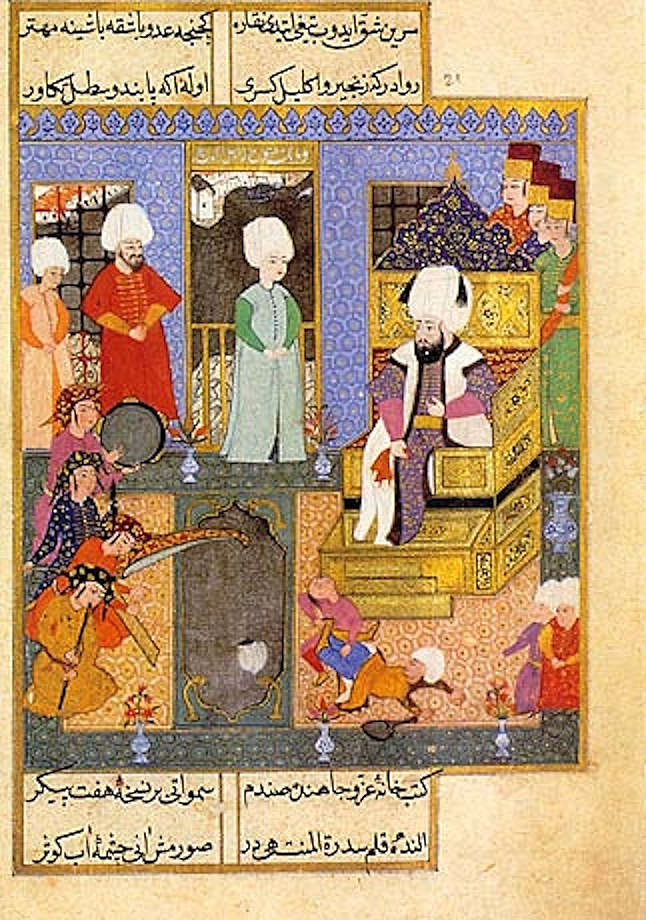
- Mehmed III entertained at the shore pavilion. Nadiri's Diwan, c. 1605. Topkapi Palace Museum Library H.889.
- Author: Text: Nadiri; Miniatures: Ahmed Naksi
- Publication date: 1605

Diwan-i Nadiri ("Collected works of Nadir", TSMK, H. 819) is an Ottoman illustrated manuscript and an anthology completed circa 1605. This poem anthology was authored by Mehmed bin Abdülgani bin Emirsah, whose pseudonym was "Nadiri“. The miniatures were executed by Ahmed Naksi, who also illustrated the Shahname-i Nadiri (Topkapi Palace Museum, H. 1124) which relates the conquest of Hotin by Osman II. The figures in the miniatures are highly individualized, and they use perspective in order to give more depth.

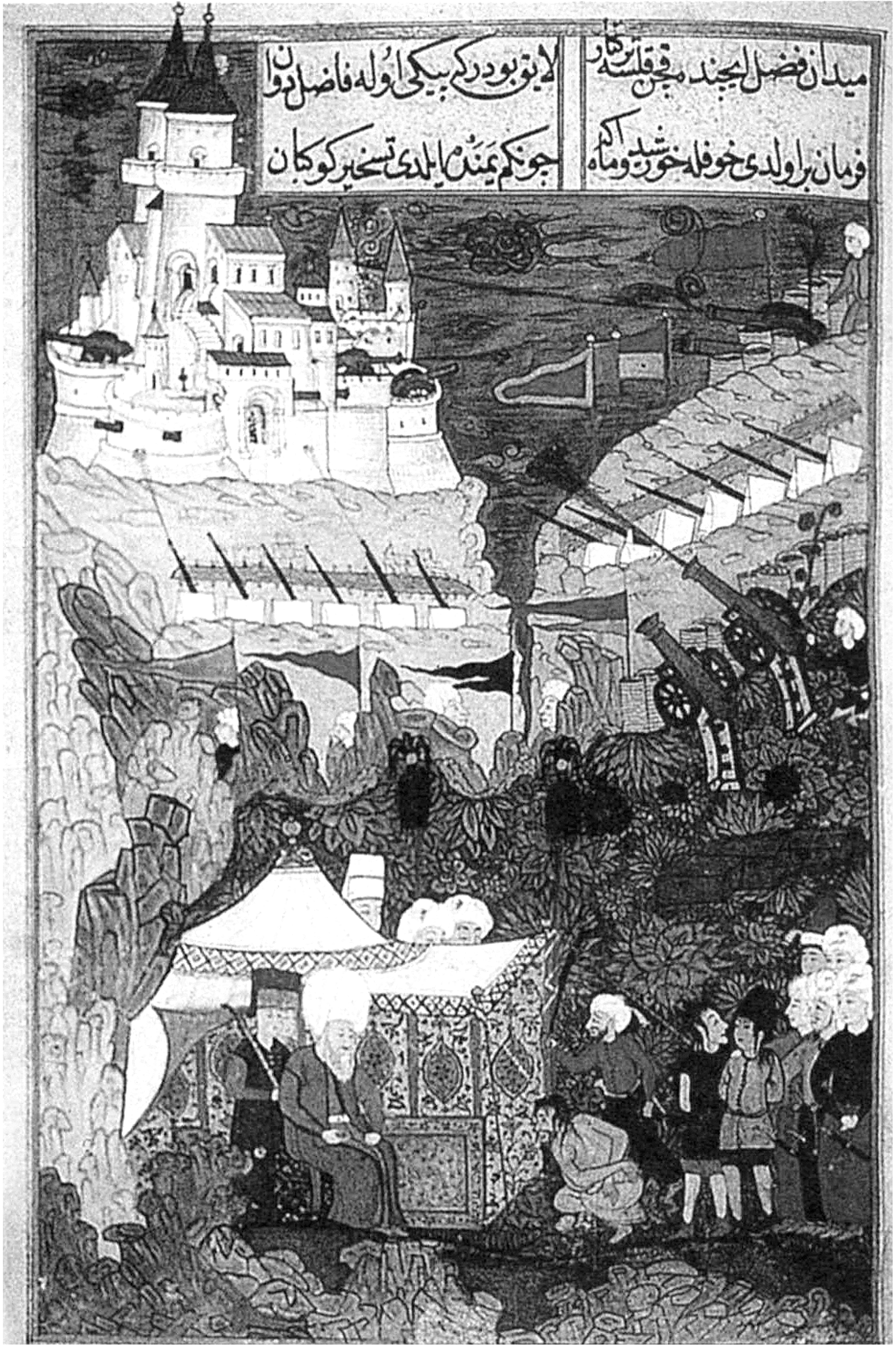
The siege of Kavkaban fortress by Sinan Pasha at Yemen

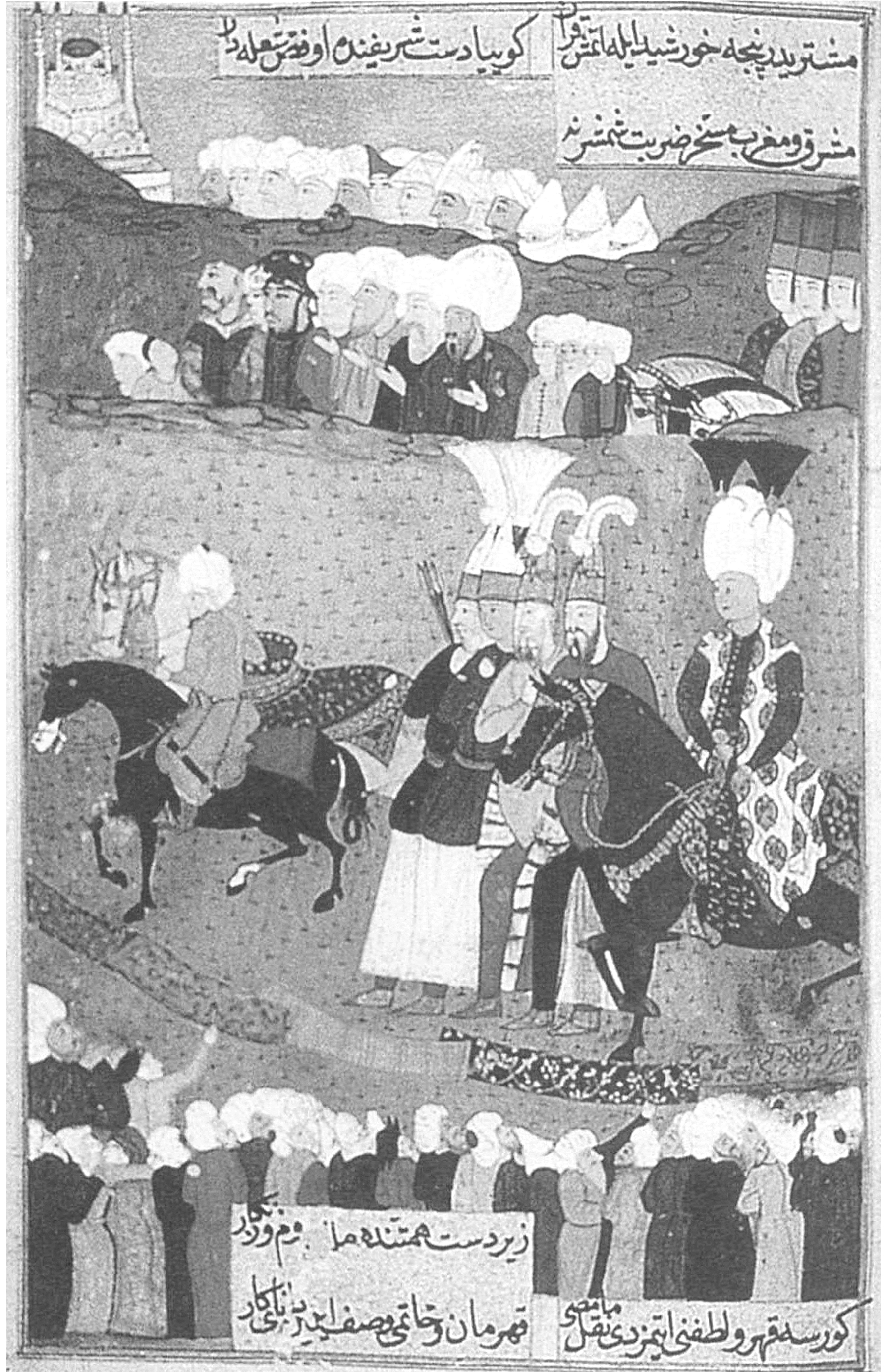
Arrival of Ahmed I at Edirne

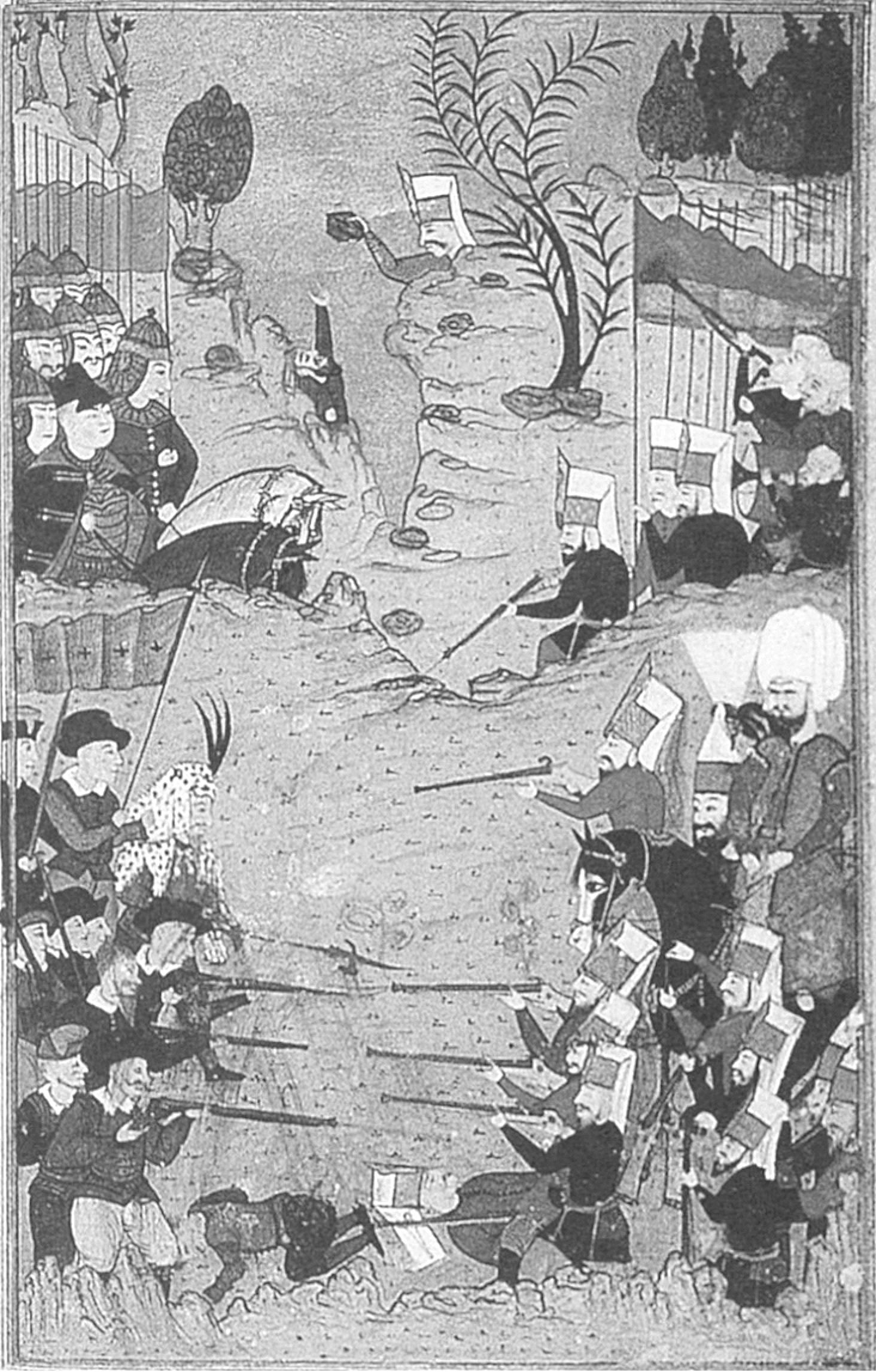
Battle of Hadim Hafiz Pasha at Nigbolu

== Sources ==
- Atil, Esin (1973). Exhibition catalogue of Turkish art of the Ottoman period (PDF). Smithsonian Institution.
