= Capture of Baghdad (1624) =

Part of the Ottoman–Safavid War (1623–1639)

- Part of Ottoman–Safavid War (1623–1639)
Location	Baghdad, Ottoman Iraq
Result	Safavid victory
Territorial changes	The capture and sack of Baghdad by the Safavid forces.

Belligerents
Safavid Empire	Ottoman Empire

Commanders and leaders
Abbas the Great; Qarachaqay Khan; George Saakadze	Bakr Soubashi (POW) (executed); Gazi Husrev Pasha; Hafiz Ahmed Pasha

Casualties and losses
Unknown	Unknown
- Massacre of Sunni inhabitants of the city by Safavids

The Capture of Baghdad (Persian: فتح بغداد) was a military operation by the Safavid army under Abbas the Great. It occurred on 14 January 1624, and was part of the ongoing war between Sultan Murad IV of the Ottoman Empire and Shah Abbas I of Safavid Iran. In the aftermath, fighting extended to other key cities in Ottoman Iraq, including Mosul, Kirkuk, and Basra.

Following this victory, fighting spread to other strategic areas in Iraq, including Mosul, Kirkuk, and Basra. Shah Abbas I, acting as the protector of Shiism, had declared the war a kind of sectarian war. However, the region did not stabilize, and the Ottomans retook the city in 1638 under Murad IV.

== See also ==
- Treaty of Nasuh Pasha
- Treaty of Serav
- List of conflicts in the Middle East

== Sources ==
- Blow, David (2009). Shah Abbas: The Ruthless King Who Became an Iranian Legend. I. B. Tauris. p. 133. ISBN 978-1845119898. "(...) managed to break into the city on the evening of 12 January 1624, and two days later Baghdad was in Safavid hands."
- Ghafouri Ali History of the Iran's battles, from the Medes up to today 2009 ISBN 9789644237386.
- Asadollah Matoufi 4000 years history of Iran army, Persian title: Tārīkh-i chahār hazār sālah-i artish-i Īrān 2003 ISBN 9646820034.
- Savory, Roger (2007). Iran Under the Safavids. Cambridge: Cambridge University Press. p. 89. ISBN 978-0521042512.
