= Siege of Baghdad (1625–1626) =

Part of the Ottoman–Safavid War (1623–1639)

- Part of Ottoman–Safavid War (1623–1639)
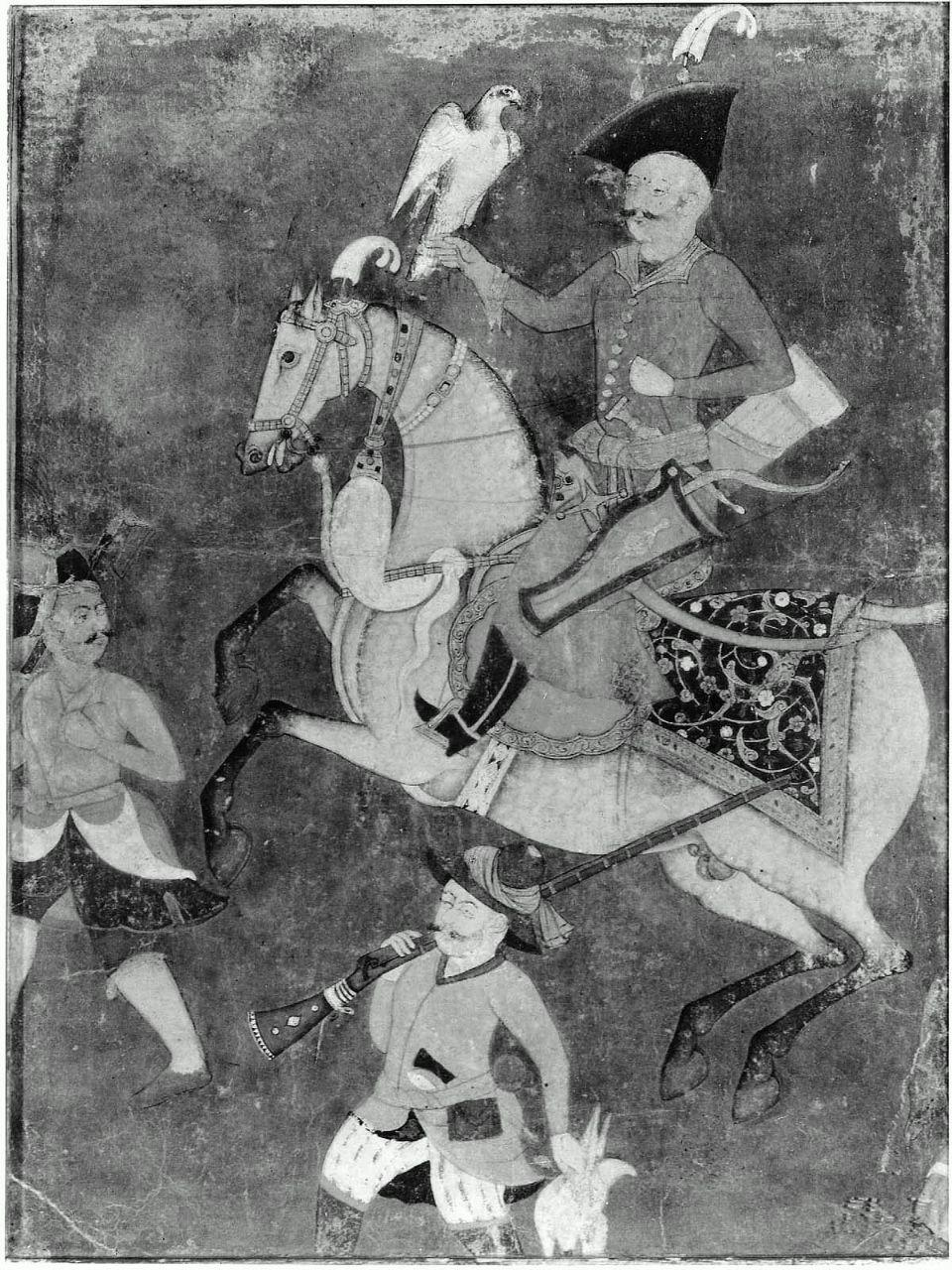
- Shah Abbas leading his army.
Date	November 1625 – 4 July 1626
Location	Baghdad, Ottoman Iraq 33.33°N 44.42°E
Result	Safavid victory

Belligerents
Safavid Empire	Ottoman Empire

Commanders and leaders
Abbas the Great	Hafiz Pasha (WIA)

Casualties and losses
Less	High

The siege of Baghdad (Persian: محاصره بغداد) began as an Ottoman re-conquest attempt against the Safavids. The Safavids took Baghdad in 1624, leading to the Ottoman Grand Vizier Hafız Ahmed Pasha forming an expedition to retake Baghdad in 1625 in Ottoman Iraq. Although they breached the outer fortifications, Persian reinforcements under Shah Abbas stopped them. Unsuccessful assaults and supply issues led to the Ottomans lifting the siege in July 1626 and retreating to Mosul, resulting in a strategic Persian victory.

== Background ==
The fall of Baghdad in 1624 dealt a significant blow to Ottoman prestige, leading to the defection of Ottoman garrisons and local tribes in the region. Subsequently, the Persians, under Shah Abbas, swiftly capitalized on the Ottoman weakness, capturing most of Iraq, including key cities such as Kirkuk and Mosul. Additionally, they seized control of the Shia holy shrines of Najaf and Karbala, symbolizing a significant loss for the Ottomans. In 1625, Hafız Ahmed Pasha, serving as the Grand Vizier of the Ottoman Empire, led an expedition to retake Baghdad and reclaim Ottoman territory in Iraq.

== Siege ==
In November 1625, Hafız Ahmed Pasha's Ottoman forces reached Baghdad, investing the city from three sides despite a "scorched earth" policy implemented by the Shah to hinder their advance. The Ottomans managed to breach the outer fortifications of Baghdad but failed to capture the city before the arrival of a relief army under Shah Abbas. Faced with the arrival of Persian reinforcements, the Ottomans retreated within their heavily fortified camp and continued their siege of Baghdad. In response, Shah Abbas devised a strategy to intercept Ottoman supply convoys, disrupting their logistics and weakening their position.

This strategy proved effective, compelling the Ottomans to risk an attack on the Persian army. However, their assault was repelled with significant casualties. As a result, on July 4, 1626, the Ottoman army lifted the siege of Baghdad and withdrew to Mosul, marking a strategic victory for Shah Abbas and the Persian forces.
