= Abu al-Fath Manuchihr Khan =

Safavid official (d. 1636)

Abu al-Fatḥ Manuchihr Khan (Persian: ابوالفتح منوچهر خان; died 1636), was a Safavid official and gholam of Armenian origin. Like his father Qarachaqay Khan, Manuchihr was established at Mashhad as the general and governor of Khorasan under the shahs (kings) Abbas I (r. 1588–1629) and Ṣāfi (r. 1629–1642). His brother Ali Quli Khan became prefect of Qom and head of Abbas I's library. Manuchihr Khan's son, Qarachaqay Khan II (d. 1668), also became a governor of Mashhad. All of them were among the Safavid cultural and intellectual elite, known as “men of knowledge and integrity’ (ahl-e fazl o kamāl) and “of illustrious acts and deeds” (ṣāheb-e mu'āṣir o asrār).

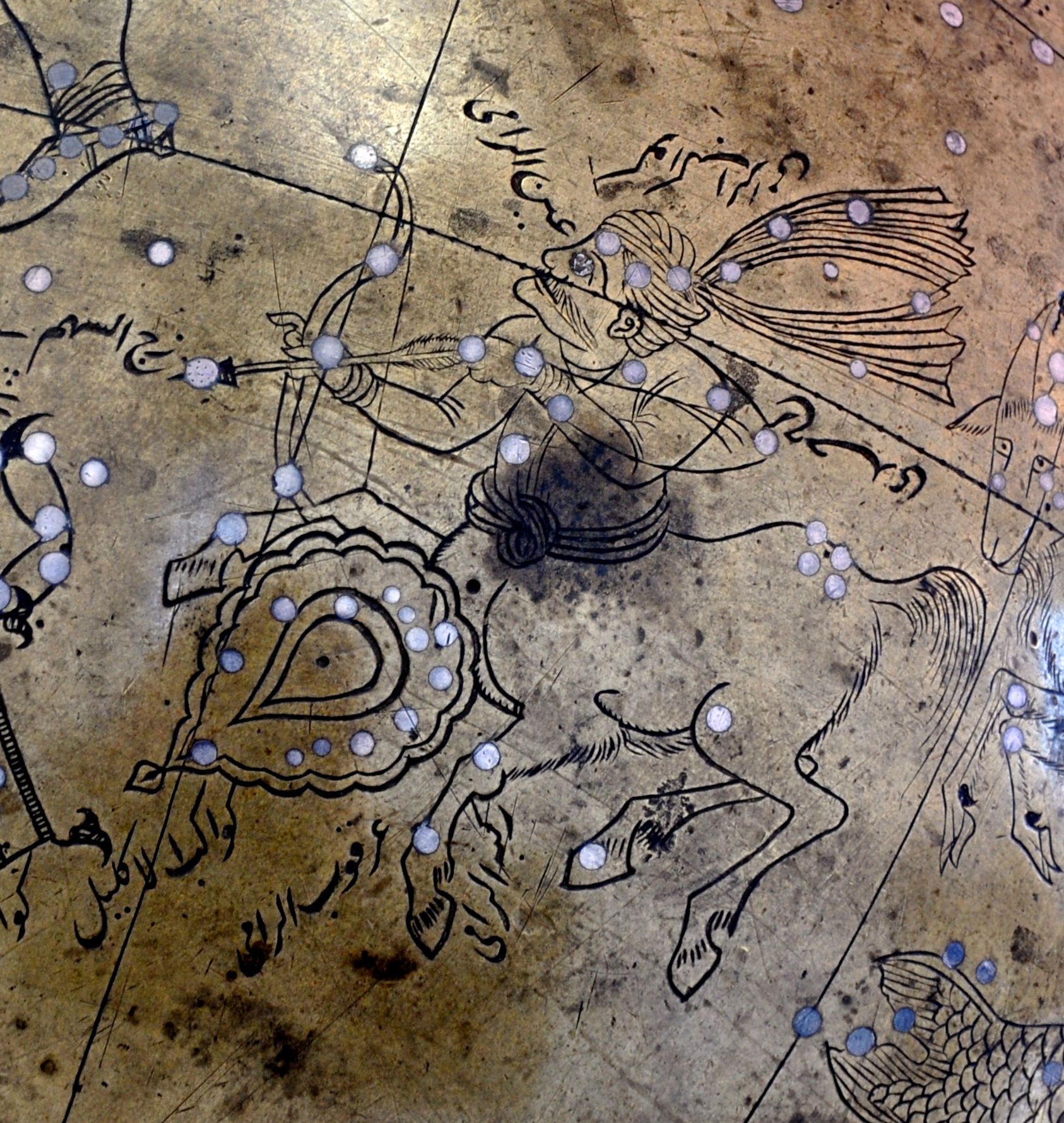
A portrait of Manuchihr Khan

== His works ==
Manuchihr Khan was a leading art patron, with a strong curiosity and interest in astronomy. He commissioned one of the finest illustrated manuscripts of the period, a Persian translation of 'Abd al-Rahmān ibn 'Umar al-Ṣūfī’s Ṣuwar al-Kawākib al-Thābitah ("the description of the fixed stars"), copied between 1630 and 1633 and conserved in the New York Public Library collection (Spencer, Pers. Ms. 6), see: Schmitz, 1992, p. 122.

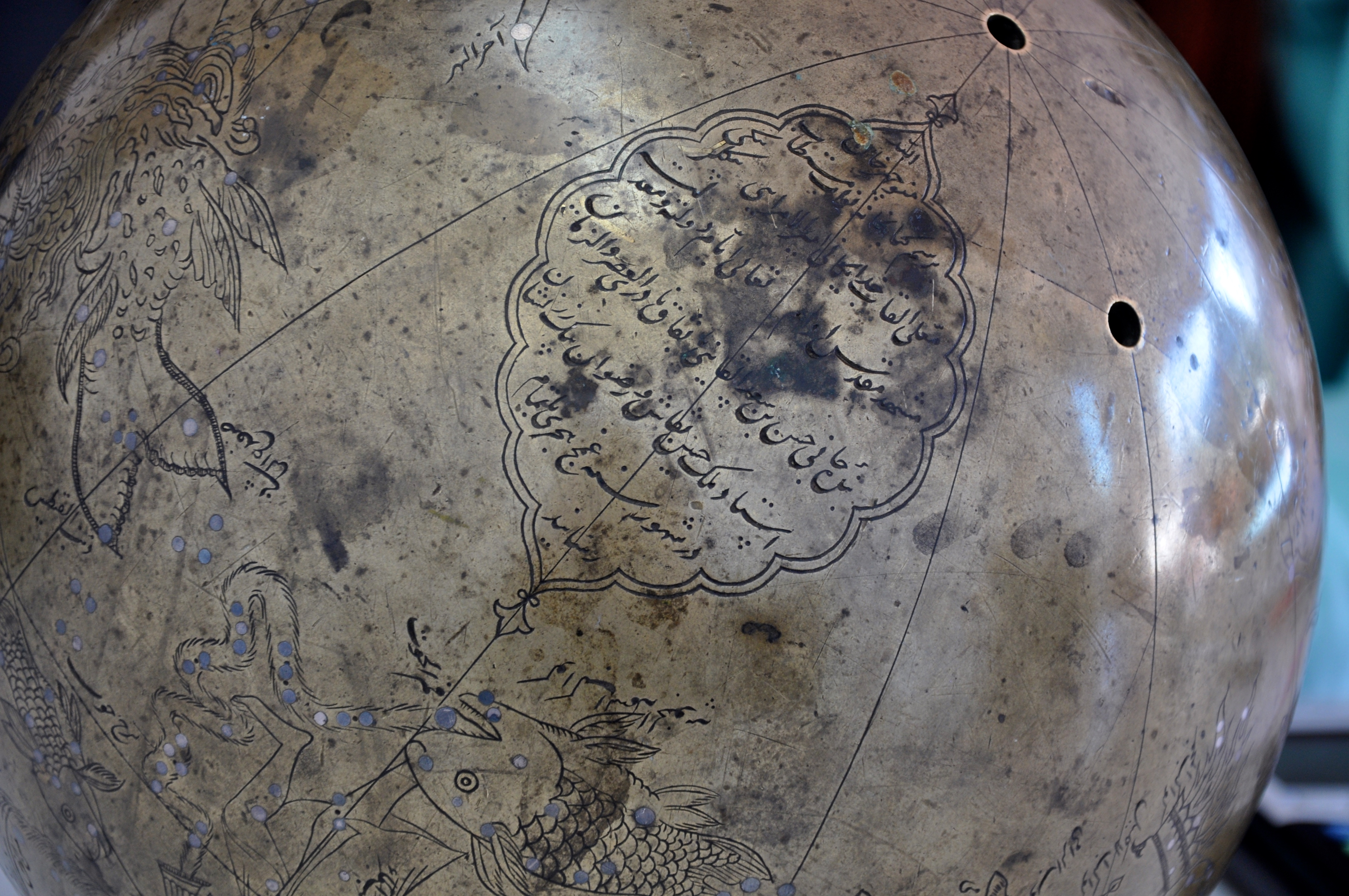
The Manuchihr Globe, Adilnor Collection, Sweden

In 1632–1633, Manuchihr Khan commissioned Hasan ibn Sa‘d al-Qa‘īnī, Master Mālik Husayn Naqqāsh Isfahānī, and Rezvan Beg Zarneshan to produce a celestial globe later known as the Manuchihr Globe.

In 1636, Muhammad Qasim completed an illustrated copy of Vahshi Bafqi's Farhad and Shirin for the library collection of Abu al-Fath Manuchihr Khan. Muhammad Qasim drew four paintings for this particular copy.

== Sources ==
- Babaie, Sussan (2004). Slaves of the Shah: New Elites of Safavid Iran. I.B.Tauris. pp. 1-256. ISBN 1860647219.
- Schmitz 1992, no.123, p. 55; Robinson, Sims, Bayani, 2007, p. 19.
- The Manuchihr Globe

Preceded by Qarachaqay Khan	Governor of Mashhad; 1625-1636	Succeeded by Qarachaqay Khan II
