= Şehnāme-i Nādirī =

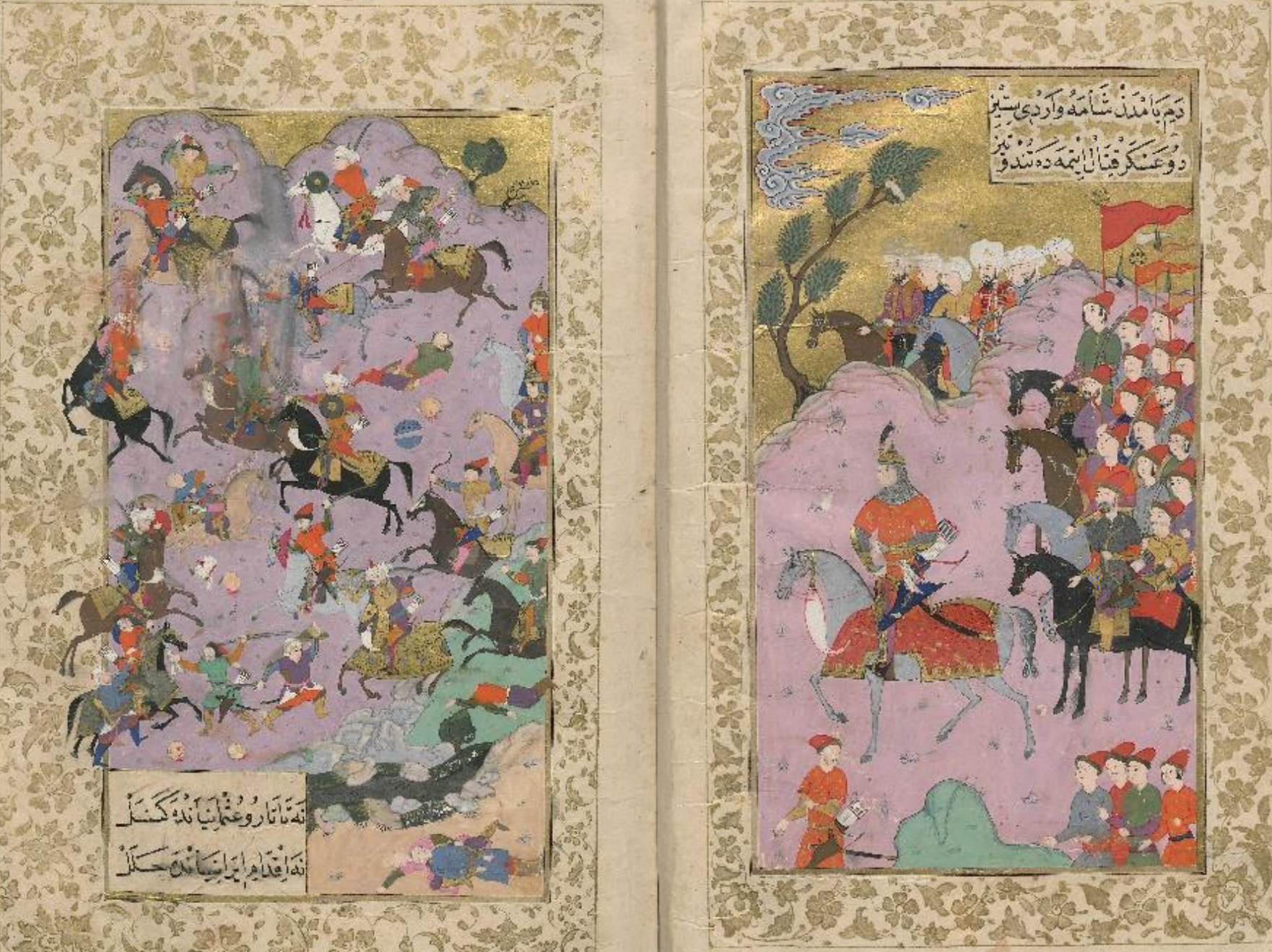
- The Battle of Serav between Ottoman-Crimean and Safavid forces in 1618. The Tatar khan Cānbek Giray joins the battle under the command of Ottoman commander Ḫalīl Paşa, while the Safavids are commanded by Ḳārçıġāy Ḫan, Governor of Tabriz, under the orders of Şah ‘Abbās. (TPML, H. 1124, 18b-19a).
- Author: Text: Nādirī; Miniatures: Ahmed Nakşi
- Publication date: 1620

The Şehnāme-i Nādirī ("Nadiri's book of kings", Topkapi Palace Museum, TSMK H.1124) is an Ottoman illustrated manuscript and an anthology completed circa 1620 which relates the conquest of Hotin by Osman II. The text was composed by Mehmed bin Abdülgani bin Emirsah, who wrote under the pen name Nādirī, an Ottoman author and scholar (d. 1626) often referred to as Gani-zade Nādirī. The miniatures were executed by Ahmed Naksi, who also illustrated the Diwan-i Nadiri (TSMK, H. 819). The figures in the miniatures are highly individualized, and they use perspective in order to give more depth.

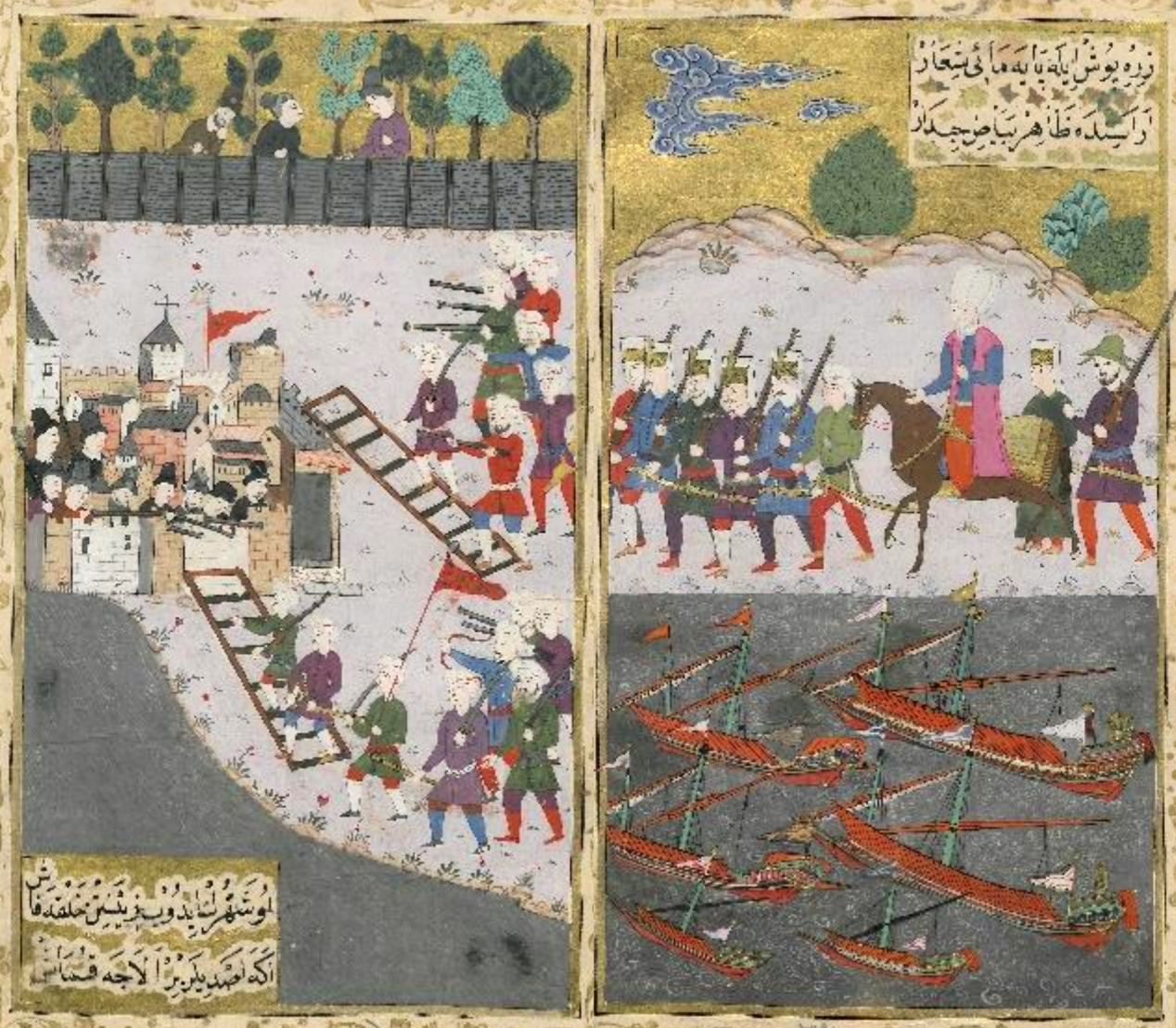
Halil Pasha's Sack of Manfredonia

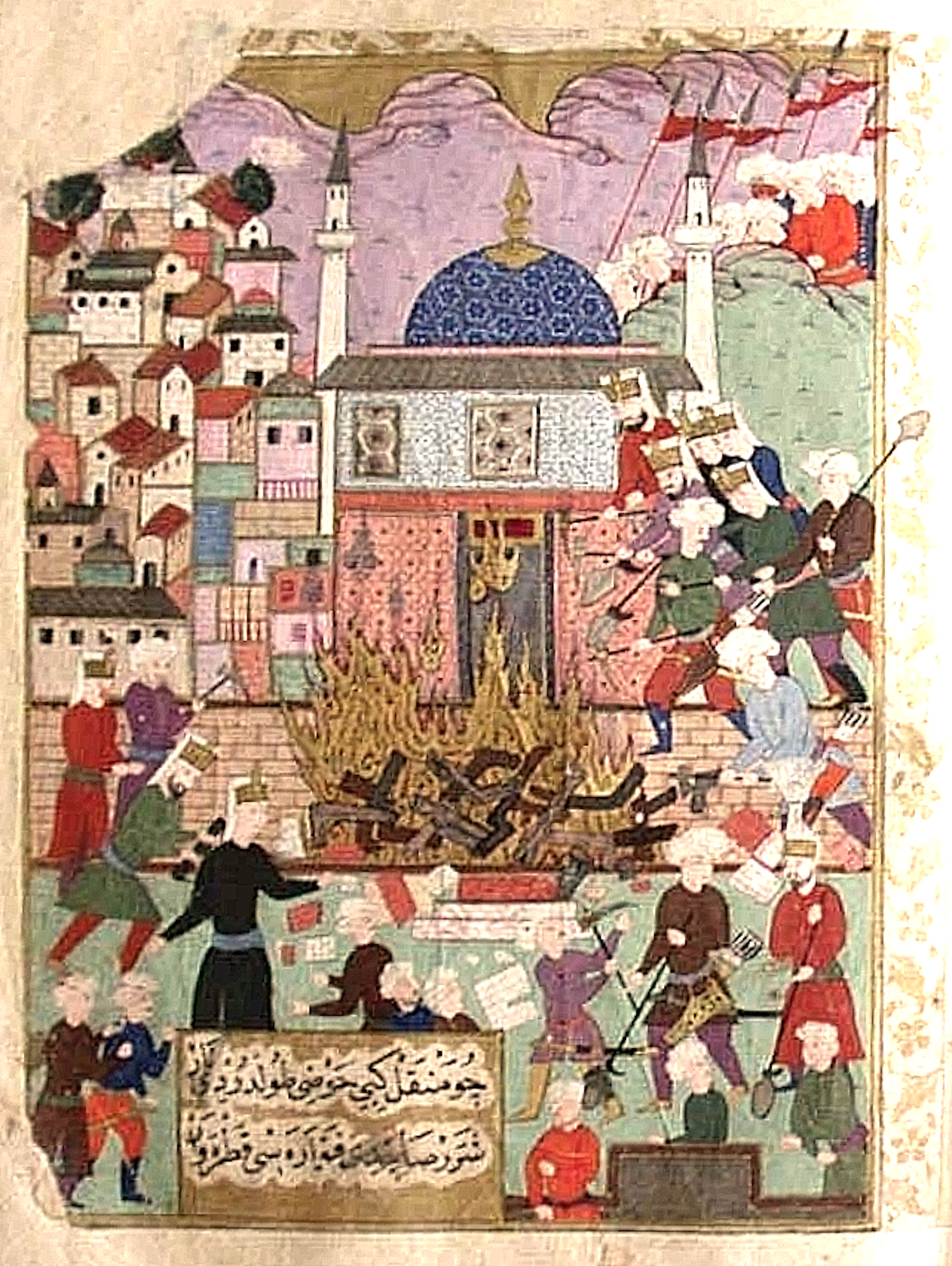
Capture of Tabriz in 1618 by Damat Halil Pasha

== Sources ==
- Atil, Esin (1973). Exhibition catalogue of Turkish art of the Ottoman period (PDF). Smithsonian Institution.
