= Abaza Mehmed Pasha =

Ottoman statesman and military commander (1576–1634)

- Abaza Mehmed
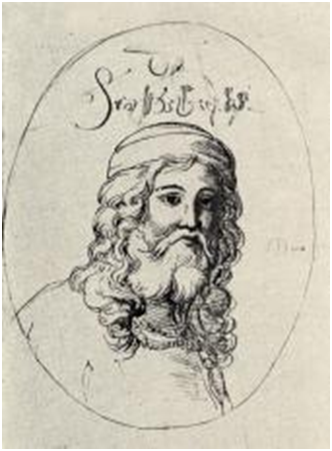
- Abaza Pasha

Beylerbey of the Bosnia Eyalet
- In office 1628–1631

Beylerbey of Erzurum

Beylerbey of the Aleppo and Marash Eyalets

Treasurer of Aleppo
- Governor: Ali Pasha Janbulad

Abaza Mehmed Pasha (Turkish: Abaza Mehmed Paşa, Abkhaz: Меҳмеҭ Росҭом-иԥа Лакырба, ма Кыржәаа); 1576 – August 23, 1634) was a statesman and military commander of the Ottoman Empire, the namesake of the Abaza rebellion. He was the beylerbey of the Bosnia Eyalet in 1628–1631. He was executed by Sultan Murad IV in 1634.

He was involved in the Abaza and Celali rebellions.

== Early life ==
Abaza was originally a slave of Abkhaz origin. The Family Lakrba is a Amista ( Lord )

== Biography ==
He started his career as the treasurer of Ali Janbulad, Pasha of Aleppo.

In 1607, he was captured for his role in Janbulad rebellion by Grand Vizier Kuyucu Murad Pasha on the Amik plain. However the timely intervention of Agha Damat Halil Pasha saved his life.

Abaza rose through ranks becoming Governor of Aleppo and Marash. He was later reported of becoming Governor of Erzurum. In 1617, his sponsor Damat Halil Pasha was appointed Grand Vizier, thus opening several closed doors upon him.

=== Celali rebellion and capture ===
Due to the constant state of war over Eastern Anatolia, Janissaries swelled up over the entire region. This coupled with the friction between native and Janissaries; and assassination of Osman II, drew the populace at odds with the Janissaries. This led Abaza to fight against the Janissaries. In 1624, he joined the Celali rebellion, and exterminated several janissaries. He further set his army towards Istanbul, to complete the objective. With a force of 30000 commoners, he captured Sivas. He besieged Ankara and Bursa, while he wasn't much successful in the latter. He retreated to Niğde. He then utilised Erzurum as headquarters for the rebels. On 16 September 1628, the new Grand Vizier Gazi Hüsrev Pasha besieged the Erzurum castle. Within a fortnight, Abaza was forced to surrender.

After his defeat Abaza was expected to be executed upon return to Istanbul. However his intelligence and courage impressed Murad IV and he was pardoned.

=== Governorship of Bosnia ===
He was given the governorship of Ottoman Bosnia (Bosna Eyalet) on 22 September 1628.

=== Polish campaign ===
In 1633, Murad IV ordered Abaza to invade Poland, when Poles didn't comply with terms of the treaty. He met with troops from Crimea, Wallachia and Moldavia in Vidin (in present day Bulgaria). The Polish envoy Trebzinski asked for peace and agreed for annual tribute to the Porte and demolishment of the forts of Dniester River.

== Execution ==
Despite his achievements the Sultan suspected him to be a rebel. In a dispute between Greeks and Armenians, he was executed on grounds that he took bribes from the Armenians and provided them with interest. He was buried at the tomb of Kuyucu Murad Pasha.

== Legacy ==
Abaza was famous for his clothing and envied/looked upon by even the Sultan.
