= Gazi Hüsrev Pasha =

Grand Vizier of the Ottoman Empire from 1628 to 1631

Grand Vizier of the Ottoman Empire
- In office 6 April 1628 – 25 October 1631
- Monarch: Murad IV
- Preceded by: Damad Halil Pasha
- Succeeded by: Hafız Ahmed Pasha

Personal details
- Born: Sanjak of Bosnia
- Died: March 1632 Tokat, Turkey
- Spouse: Ayşe Sultan (disputed)
- Education: Enderun School

Military service
- Battles/wars: Capture of Baghdad (1624); Siege of Baghdad (1630)

Gazi Hüsrev Pasha (died March 1632), also called Boşnak Hüsrev Pasha ("Hüsrev Pasha the Bosnian") or Ekrem Hüsrev Pasha ("Hüsrev Pasha the Kind"), was an Ottoman Grand Vizier of Bosnian descent during the reign of Murad IV.

== Early life ==
He hailed from the Sanjak of Bosnia. He studied in the Enderun palace school. In 1625, he was promoted to be a vizier (minister). During the second Abaza rebellion, Damad Halil Pasha, then grand vizier, attempted to capture the fort of Erzurum (in eastern Turkey), then under the control of Abaza Mehmed Pasha, the leader of the rebellion. However, after a siege of 70 days, Damad Halil Pasha failed to capture the city and was dismissed from the post. Hüsrev Pasha was appointed as the new grand vizier on April 6, 1628.

== As grand vizier ==
Hüsrev Pasha laid siege on Erzurum once again on September 5, 1628. The operation was faster than Abaza Mehmed Pasha had anticipated, and the city was not ready for a long siege. On September 18, Abaza Mehmed surrendered. Hüsrev's easy victory, ending a long and costly rebellion, gained him fame and favor. He became the de facto ruler of the Empire, since, according to historian Joseph von Hammer, Hüsrev's instructions were more effective than the instructions of the 15-year-old sultan Murad IV. Hüsrev Pasha decreased the number of viziers in the porte and made a habit of executing his political opponents.

== Baghdad campaign ==
Hüsrev's next mission was to reconquer Baghdad (capital of modern Iraq), which had been captured in 1624 by the Safavid shah Abbas I. In late 1629, he began invading Persian territory around Baghdad. However, the invasion occurred during the rainy season, and it was impossible to lay a siege on the city itself. Thus, Hüsrev Pasha chose to capture other cities around Baghdad, one of his subordinates defeating a Persian army. The siege of Baghdad began on June 22, 1630, and continued until November 14, 1630, without success. After this failure, Hüsrev Pasha decided to continue the operation in 1631. When the next year arrived, however, he delayed beginning the siege citing a lack of reinforcements. On October 25, 1631, he was dismissed from office.

== Death ==
The news about Hüsrev's dismissal caused a general unrest in the empire. Hüsrev's successor, Hafız Ahmed Pasha, was killed by rebels in the palace. Murad IV blamed Hüsrev for the unrest and sent another pasha to Tokat (in northern Turkey), the city where Hüsrev was residing, to execute him. After some minor clashes, Hüsrev was executed in March 1632.

== See also ==
- List of Ottoman grand viziers

Political offices
Preceded by Damat Halil Pasha	Grand Vizier of the Ottoman Empire; 6 April 1628 – 25 October 1631	Succeeded by Hafız Ahmed Pasha
