= Hafız Ahmed Pasha =

Grand Vizier of the Ottoman Empire (1625–1626, 1631–1632)

Hafiz · Muezzinzade Ahmed Pasha

Grand Vizier of the Ottoman Empire
- In office 25 October 1631 – 10 February 1632
- Monarch: Murad IV
- Preceded by: Gazi Hüsrev Pasha
- Succeeded by: Topal Recep Pasha
- In office 28 January 1625 – 1 December 1626
- Monarch: Murad IV
- Preceded by: Çerkes Mehmed Pasha
- Succeeded by: Damat Halil Pasha

Personal details
- Born: 1564 Plovdiv, Ottoman Empire (modern day Bulgaria)
- Died: 10 February 1632 (aged 67–68) Constantinople, Ottoman Empire
- Spouse: Ayşe Sultan (m. 1626)
- Children: Sultanzade Mustafa Bey; Sultanzade Fülan Bey

Military service
- Battles/wars: Capture of Baghdad (1624); Siege of Baghdad (1625–1626) (WIA)

Hafiz Ahmed Pasha (1564, Plovdiv, Ottoman Empire – 10 February 1632, Constantinople), also known by epithet Muezzinzade ("muezzin's son"), was an Ottoman statesman who served as grand vizier twice.

He was born as the son of a Pomak muezzin. He went to Constantinople at the age of 15. He was an employee in the sultan's palace for many years. From 1609 on, he became Governor of Damascus (Damascus), Van (Turkey), Erzurum (Turkey), Baghdad (Ottoman Iraq), and other Anatolian eyalets. He married Ayşe Sultan, a daughter of Ahmed I and Kösem Sultan, on 13 March 1626. With her, he had two sons, Sultanzade Mustafa Bey and Sultanzade Fülan Bey. He was killed in office during a revolt on 10 February 1632, when the Janissaries attempted to overthrow Sultan Murad IV.

== See also ==
- List of Ottoman grand viziers

== Sources ==
- Peirce, Leslie P. (1993). The Imperial Harem: Women and Sovereignty in the Ottoman Empire. Oxford University Press. ISBN 978-0-195-08677-5.
- Sakaoğlu, Necdet (2008). Bu mülkün kadın sultanları: Vâlide sultanlar, hâtunlar, hasekiler, kadınefendiler, sultanefendiler. Oğlak Yayıncılık. p. 303.
- Uluçay, Mustafa Çağatay (1985). Padışahların kadınları ve kızları [The wives and daughters of the sultans] (in Turkish). Türk Tarihi Kurumu Yayınları.

Political offices
Preceded by Çerkes Mehmed Pasha	Grand Vizier of the Ottoman Empire; 28 January 1625 – 1 December 1626	Succeeded by Damat Halil Pasha
Preceded by Gazi Ekrem Hüsrev Pasha	Grand Vizier of the Ottoman Empire; 25 October 1631 – 10 February 1632	Succeeded by Topal Recep Pasha
