= Qarachaqay Khan =

Safavid military commander (d. 1625)

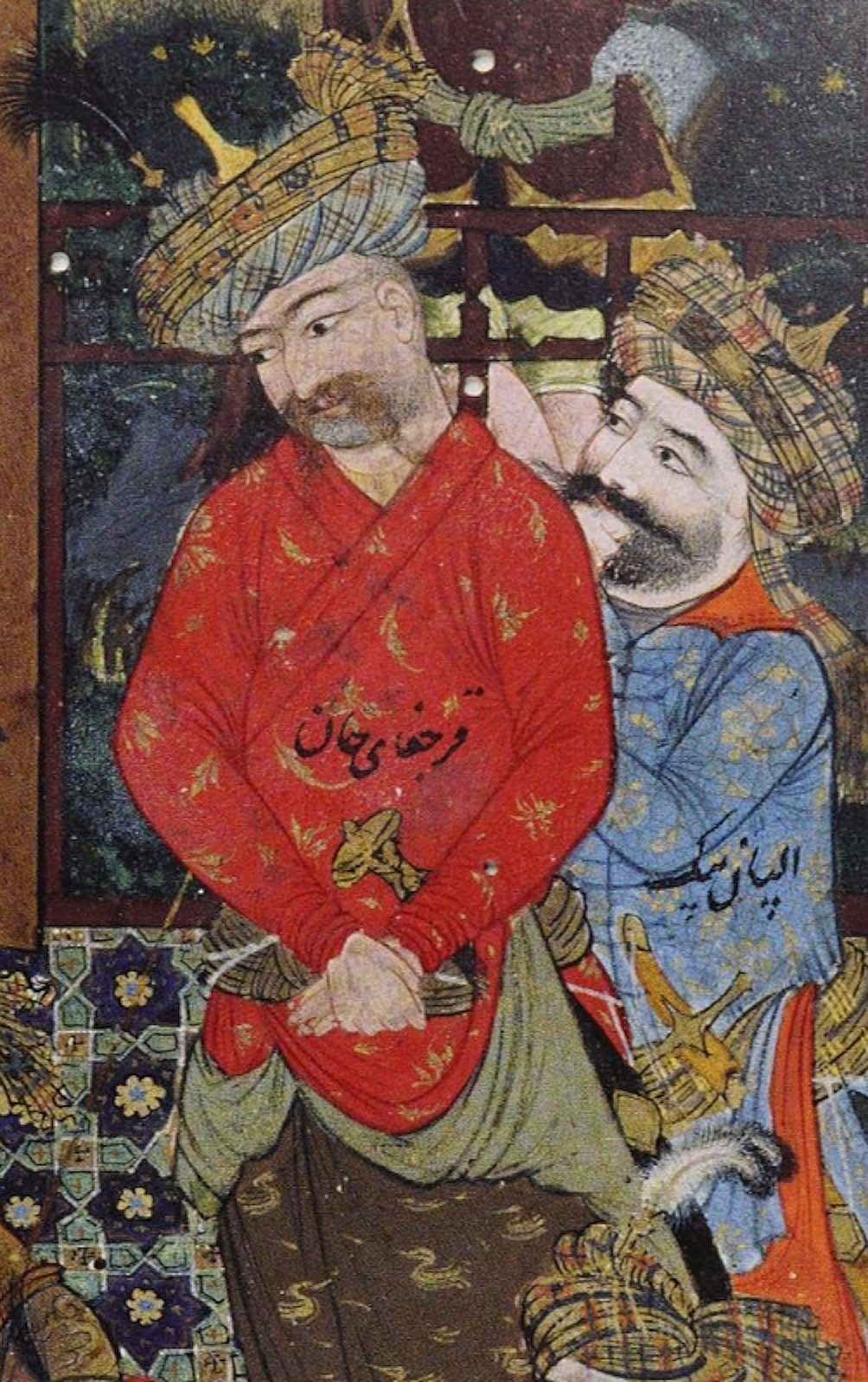
- "A court scene", Iran, c. 1620. Qarachaqay Khan appears standing in a red coat, with a prominent handlebar mustache.

Sepahsalar–e Iran (Commander-in-chief)
- In office 1616–1625
- Monarch: Abbas the Great
- Preceded by: Shahqoli Soltan Ustajlu
- Succeeded by: Zeinal Khan Shamlu

Governor of Azerbaijan province
- In office 1618–1620
- Monarch: Abbas the Great
- Preceded by: Shahbandeh Beg Torkman (1st term)
- Succeeded by: Shahbandeh Beg Torkman (2nd term)

Governor of Mashhad
- In office 1618–1625
- Monarch: Abbas the Great
- Preceded by: Nazar Khan Tavakoli
- Succeeded by: Manuchihr Khan

Personal details
- Born: Erivan, Erivan province, Safavid Iran
- Died: 25 March 1625 near Martqopi
- Resting place: Mashhad
- Children: Imam Verdi Khan, Abu al-Fath Manuchihr Khan
- Occupation: Military leader, official

Military service
- Allegiance: Safavid Iran
- Battles/wars: Ottoman–Safavid War of 1603–1618; Battle of Sufiyan; Battle of Martqopi †

Qarachaqay Khan (Persian: قرچغای خان; died 1625) was a military commander of Armenian origin in Safavid Iran. He was known for his great collection of porcelain items and loyal service to Abbas the Great. Qarachaqay Khan was killed while commanding an expedition against Georgian rebels.

== Career ==
Born as a Christian Armenian in Erivan, Qarachaqay was enslaved in childhood and brought to the Safavid court to be raised as a gholam. He began his career in a royal tailoring workshop and was soon distinguished in the Safavid army as an artillery officer. In 1605, Qarachaqay Beg, being in charge of a musketeer regiment, under the command of Allahverdi Khan—also originally a gholam of Georgian origin—contributed to Abbas I's victory over the Ottoman forces at the Battle of Sufiyan near Tabriz.

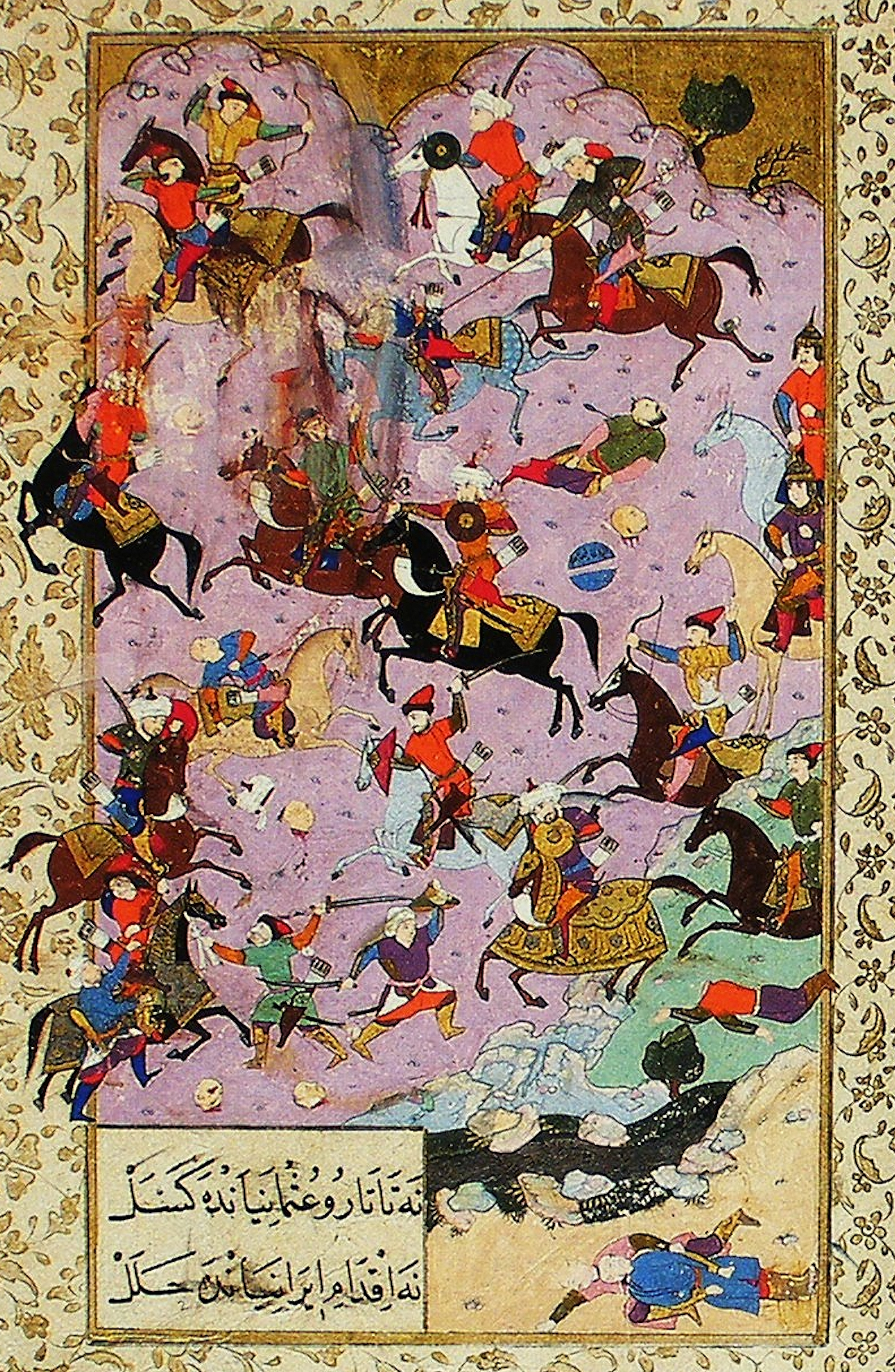
Crimean Khan Janibek Giray battle with the Persian commander Qarachaqay Khan in 1617. Şehname-i Nadiri (Nadiri's book of kings) (1620s).

During his career in the Safavid army and administration, Qarachaqay amassed a valuable collection of Chinese porcelain which he presented to Shah Abbas around 1610. Shortly afterwards, Qarachaqay was bestowed with the title of muqarab al-hazrat ("intimate of the illustrious"), reserved for the Shah's close companions. In 1616, he received the title of khan and was appointed commander-in-chief (sepahsalar-e Iran) of the Safavid army. A year after the defeat of the Ottoman troops led by Khalil Pasha, he became governor of Tabriz and all of Azerbaijan, but was soon recalled by the shah to continue his service as governor of Mashhad in northeastern Khorasan in 1618. When Abbas I decided to marry his granddaughter to Semayun Khan of Kartli (Simon II) in 1624, Qarachaqay Khan ordered Yusuf Khan, likewise of Christian Armenian origin and a childhood friend, to host the banquet in the first term of the wedding party. In the same year, Qarachaqay Khan, accompanied by the Safavid Georgian officer Murav-Beg (Giorgi Saakadze), captained a punitive expedition against the rebels in Georgia. Murav-Beg conspired with the insurgents, who unexpectedly attacked and destroyed the Iranian camp at Martqopi, killing Qarachaqay Khan and one of his sons, Imam Verdi Khan. Both were buried within a family shrine complex in Mashhad.

Of Qarachaqay Khan's other sons, Abu al-Fath Manuchihr Khan (died 1636) rose to the governorship of Mashhad and Ali Quli Khan became prefect of Qom and head of the shah's library. Manuchihr Khan's son, Qarachaqay Khan (died c. 1668), was also governor of Mashhad. All of them were known as sponsors of learning and culture.

== See also ==
- Shahnameh of Qarachaqay Khan

== Notes ==
Preceded by Shahqoli Soltan Ustajlu	Commander-in-chief (sepahsalar-e Iran); 1616–1626	Succeeded by Zeinal Khan Shamlu
Preceded by Shahbandeh Beg Torkman (1st term)	Governor of Azerbaijan; 1618-1620	Succeeded by Shahbandeh Beg Torkman (2nd term)
Preceded by Nazar Khan Tavakoli	Governor of Mashhad; 1618-1625	Succeeded by Manuchihr Khan
