= Damat Halil Pasha =

Grand Vizier of the Ottoman Empire (1616–1619, 1626–1628)

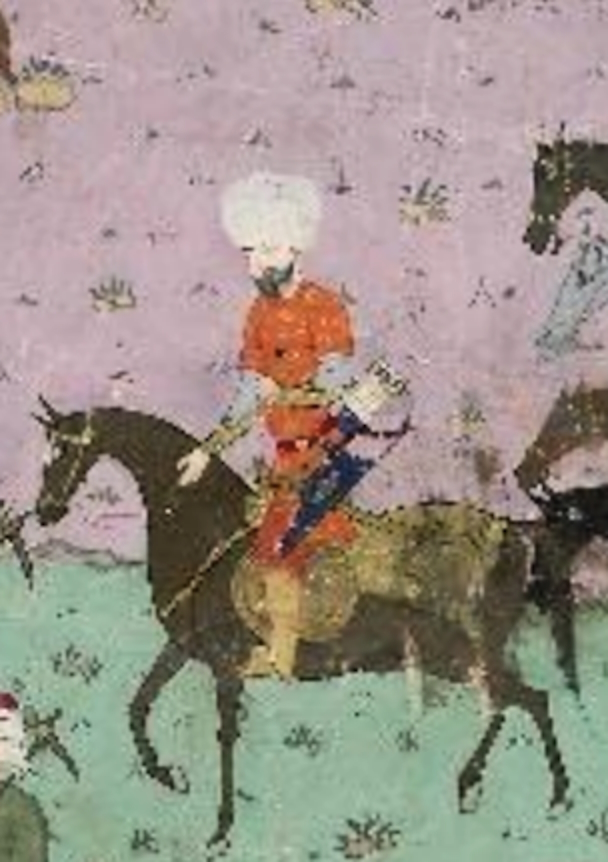
- The Grand Vizier Ḫalīl Paşa, sent to fight Şah ‘Abbās, and to plunder Tabriz in 1618. Şehnāme-i Nādirī

Grand Vizier of the Ottoman Empire
- In office 1 December 1626 – 6 April 1628
- Monarch: Murad IV
- Preceded by: Hafız Ahmed Pasha
- Succeeded by: Gazi Hüsrev Pasha
- In office 17 November 1616 – 18 January 1619
- Monarchs: Ahmed I Mustafa I Osman II
- Preceded by: Öküz Mehmed Pasha
- Succeeded by: Öküz Mehmed Pasha

Personal details
- Born: c. 1570
- Died: 1629 (aged 58–59) Istanbul, Ottoman Empire
- Spouse: Beyhan Sultan (m. 1612)
- Children: Sultanzade Mahmud Bey; Sultanzade Ebubekir Bey

Military service
- Allegiance: Ottoman Empire
- Battles/wars: Battle of Paphos; Raid of Żejtun; Sack of Manfredonia

Damat Halil Pasha (died 1629, Istanbul), also known as Khalil Pasha, was an Ottoman Armenian statesman. He was grand vizier of the Ottoman Empire in 1616–1619 and 1626–1628. He also served in the Ottoman Navy, and led a number of attacks including the Raid of Żejtun in Malta in 1614 and the Sack of Manfredonia in 1620.

== Biography ==
He was born in the village of “Fernos” (or Fırnız) near Zeytun, modern Süleymanlı, in the province of Kahramanmaraş. Recruited as a dervish he was brought up in this condition. His brother Shahid Mehmed Pasha held high positions (beylerbey and vizier) and this helped him to prosper. Shahid died on April 2, 1589, in what is considered the first revolt of the Janissaries which ended in the death of a vizier (not a great vizier). After being a court falconer he came to Agha of the Janissaries on January 4, 1607. The military campaign that year was directed against the rebels of Anatolia, under the direction of the commander in chief ( serdar ). Kuyucu Murad Pasha . In 1608 Khalid went to eastern Anatolia by order of Murad Pasha; so he was able to return to Istanbul triumphantly.

On February 16, 1609, Captain Pasha Hafız Ahmed was removed and Halil was appointed in his place; he defeated the pirates of the eastern Mediterranean and defeated a Maltese fleet near Cyprus by capturing the " Red Galleon " armed with 80 guns, commanded by the knight Fraissinet in the naval battle of Kara Djahannam. He was appointed vizier on 25 November 1609. On 16 July 1610 he led a new campaign against pirates and privateers without major battles; he began negotiations to forge an alliance with the Netherlands and Morocco against Spain, sending the first letter to the States General of The Hague on July 16, 1610. France and Venice opposed but maintained good relations with these states. He lost his post from 1611 to 1613 when he was occupied by court favorite Öküz Kara Mehmed Pasha. However he continued to negotiate with Holland and a Dutch ambassador, Cornelius Haga, arrived in Istanbul on 17 March 1612 and under the influence of Damat was received by the caimacam and other high dignitaries, and by the sultan on 1 May 1612, however no treaty was never reached, as at that time Holland was in truce (from 1609) with Spain (and remained so until 1621).

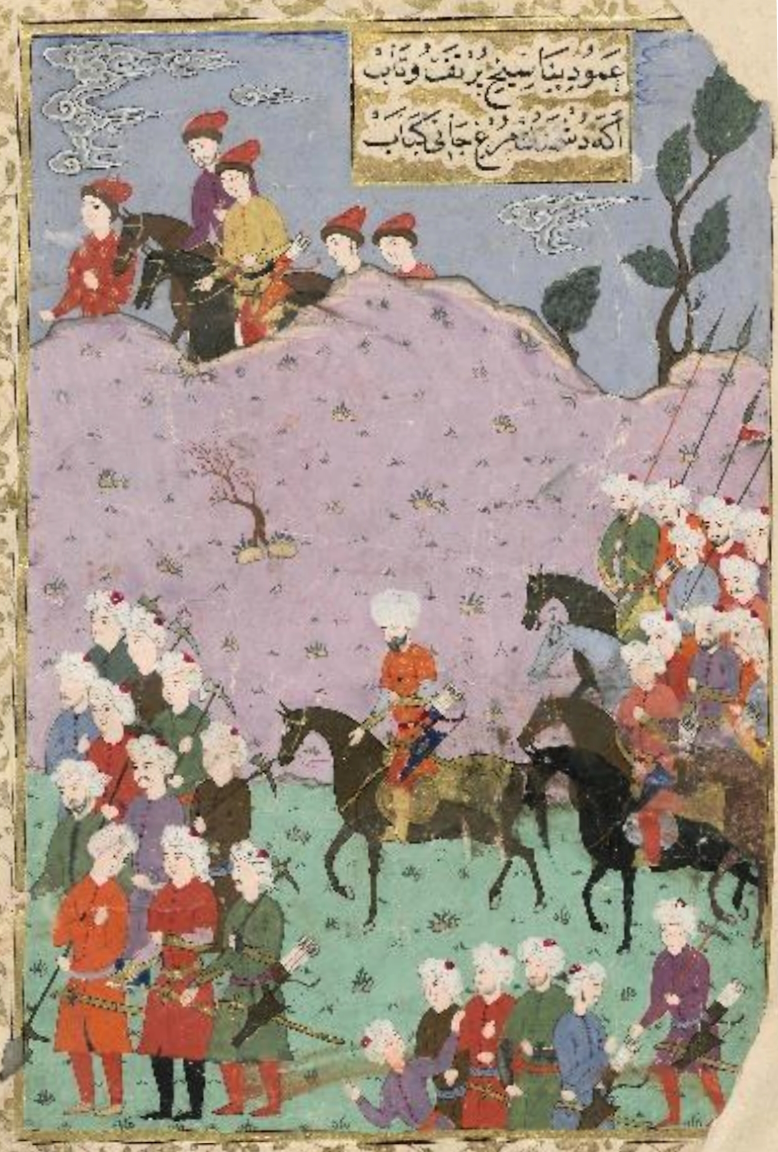
Grand Vizier Ḫalīl Paşa and his troops, sent to fight Shah Abbas of Persia in 1618. Şehnāme-i Nādirī

On 22 November 1613 he was renamed captain pasha; in 1614 he attacked Malta and continued on to Tripoli in Libya where he attacked the local rebel Safer Dey, who was captured and executed. He previously suppressed a revolt of the Greeks of Maina ( southern Peloponnese ) in collaboration with the Ottoman governor of the region Arslan Pasha; he returned to Istanbul in November 1614. On April 17, 1615, he returned to the sea and sailed along the coast of Calabria capturing a Spanish galleon from Sicily . Upon his return to Istanbul on November 18, 1615, he resisted the intrigues of the Ottoman dragoman in Vienna, Gratiani, in favor of the Habsburgs and against the interests of Venetians, Dutch and French.

On 23 December 1619, Kapudan Pasha Güzelce Ali Pasha was appointed Grand Vizier and Damat Halil Pasha replaced him as head of the fleet; he advised attacking Spain instead of Venice which had the most powerful fleet; the sultan wanted to make war on Poland but the grand vizier opted for the war in Hungary; he was ordered to take 43 galleys to the mouth of the Danube . Spain's requests for a truce were rejected by Khalil (spring 1620); on 27 June 1620 he headed towards the archipelago and sacked Manfredonia in the Kingdom of Naples in August; in 1620 the captain pasha hanged the rebel governor of Tripoli Safar Dayf (day of Sulayman Sfer) in Libya. In 1621 Khalil went to the Black Sea to support the campaign of Osman II and with a fleet of 40 galleys repelled the attack of the Cossacks returning to base on November 21, 1621. In 1622 the sultan left with the fleet at the archipelagobut then a revolt broke out (May) and the sultan remained on the ship of the captain pasha; he offered him the post of Grand Vizier (20 May 1622) which he refused and was isolated from the conflicts in the capital. In the summer of 1622 he went on an outing with the fleet until the autumn. At the beginning of 1623 he supported the peace policy with Poland until he was revoked by the new Grand Vizier Mere Hüseyin Pasha, appointed for the second time on February 5, 1623, who considered him his rival, and sent him into exile in Malkara in Thrace.

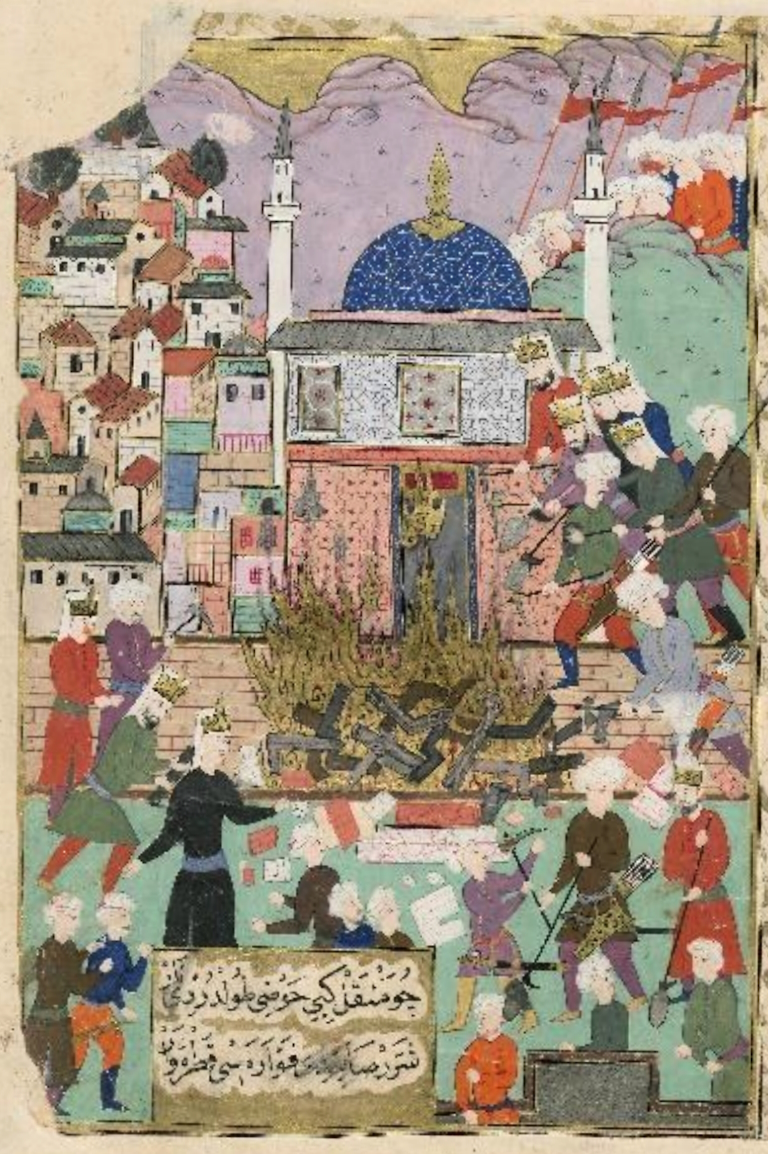
Tabriz is plundered by the Ottoman army of The Grand Vizier Ḫalīl Paşa (1618). Şehnāme-i Nādirī

Abaza Mehmed Pasha rebelled against Erzerum with the Sipahi to avenge the assassination of Osman II, against the rival corps of the Janissaries accused of having killed him. Abaza was considered a believer in Khalil. When Murad IV ascended the throne, the Valide sultan Kösem restored him to the rank of vizier but without receiving any post.

Finally, on 1 or 2 December 1626 he was appointed Grand Vizier for the second time with the order to obtain the submission of Abaza Mehmed Pasha, still in revolt in Anatolia, and to conclude a treaty with Persia . In August 1627 he began talks with Abaza in Erzurum, unsuccessfully, and protected in the fortress, Abaza could not be subdued. The Persians occupied Akhiskha and Khalil, without artillery and with the cold season approaching, lifted the siege of Erzurum in November, spending the winter in Tokat. Having failed to subdue Abaza and not having won the war with Persia, he was deposed on 6 April 1628. The only one who accepted the succession was Gazi Ekrem Hüsrev Pasha., agha of the Janissaries, who obtained the surrender of Abaza some time later. In May 1628 Khalil returned to Istanbul with his rank of vizier and prestige still intact.

He died on August 5, 1629.

== Family ==
He married Beyhan Sultan, a daughter of Mehmed III, in 1612. The couple had two children, Sultanzade Mahmud Bey and Sultanzade Ebubekir Bey.

== See also ==
- List of Ottoman grand viziers

Political offices
Preceded by Öküz Mehmed Pasha	Grand Vizier of the Ottoman Empire; 17 November 1616 – 18 January 1619	Succeeded by Öküz Mehmed Pasha
Preceded by Hafız Ahmed Pasha	Grand Vizier of the Ottoman Empire; 1 December 1626 – 6 April 1628	Succeeded by Gazi Hüsrev Pasha
