= Kösem Sultan =

Valide Sultan of the Ottoman Empire

- Naib-i-Sultanat; Büyük Valide Sultan; Valide Sultan
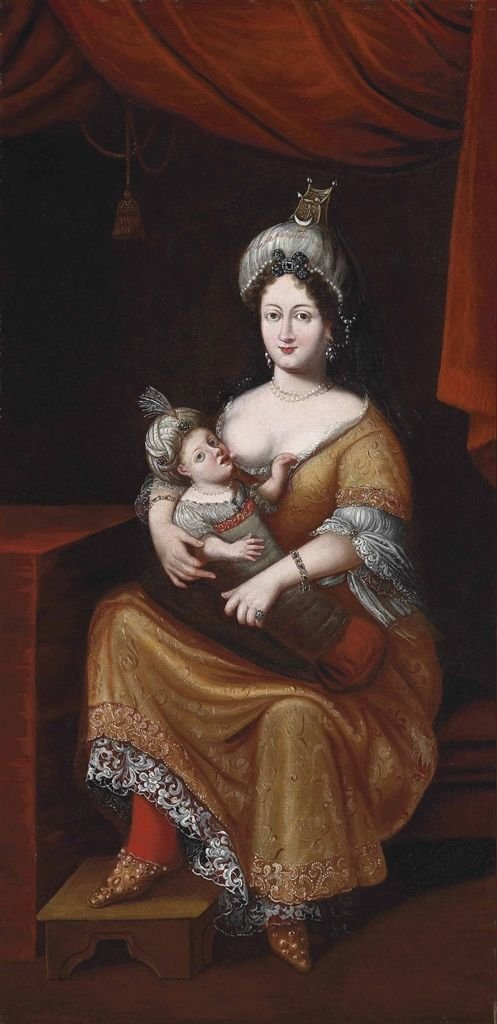

Büyük Valide Sultan of the Ottoman Empire (Grand Empress Mother)
- Tenure: 8 August 1648 – 2 September 1651

Regent of the Ottoman Empire
- First tenure: 10 September 1623 – 18 May 1632
- Monarch: Murad IV
- Second tenure: 8 February 1640 – 8 August 1648
- Monarch: Ibrahim
- Third tenure: 8 August 1648 – 2 September 1651
- Monarch: Mehmed IV

Valide Sultan of the Ottoman Empire (Empress Mother)
- Tenure: 10 September 1623 – 2 September 1651
- Predecessor: Halime Sultan
- Successor: Turhan Sultan
- With: Turhan Sultan (1648–1651)

Haseki Sultan of the Ottoman Empire (Chief Consort)
- Tenure: 26 November 1605 – 22 November 1617
- Predecessor: Safiye Sultan
- Successor: Ayşe Sultan
- Born: Anastasia (?) c. 1589; Tinos, Republic of Venice or Bosnia Eyalet
- Died: 2 September 1651 (aged 61–62); Topkapı Palace, Constantinople, Ottoman Empire
- Burial: Sultan Ahmed Mosque, Istanbul
- Consort of: Ahmed I (died 1617)
- Issue among others...: Şehzade Mehmed; Gevherhan Sultan (?); Ayşe Sultan; Fatma Sultan; Hanzade Sultan; Murad IV; Şehzade Süleyman (?); Şehzade Kasım; Atike Sultan (?); Ibrahim I
Names
- Turkish: Mahpeyker Kösem Sultan; Ottoman Turkish: ماه پيكر كسم سلطان
- House: Ottoman (by marriage)
- Religion: Sunni Islam, previously Greek Orthodox Christian

Kösem Sultan (Ottoman Turkish: كسم سلطان; (Note: Ottoman Turkish: كوسم سلطان, romanized: Kösem Sulṭān, Turkish pronunciation: [cœˈsɛm suɫˈtan]) 1589 – 2 September 1651), also known as Mahpeyker Kösem Sultan (Ottoman Turkish: ماه پیكر; (Note: Ottoman Turkish: ماه پيكر, romanized: Māh-peyker, Turkish pronunciation: [mahpejˈcɛɾ])), was the favorite consort and possible legal wife of Ottoman sultan Ahmed I, the mother of Murad IV and Ibrahim, and the grandmother of Mehmed IV. She effectively ruled as regent of the Ottoman Empire during the minority of Murad IV from 1623 to 1632, from 1640 to 1648 during the unstable rule of Ibrahim, and again from 1648 until her assassination in 1651 during the minority of Mehmed IV. She was one of the most powerful and influential women in Ottoman history, as well as a central and controversial figure during the period known as the Sultanate of Women.

Kösem's status and influence were facilitated by her astute grasp of Ottoman politics and the large number of children she bore. Her sons and grandson required her regency, and her daughters' marriages to prominent statesmen provided her with allies in the government. Her efforts to keep Sultan Ahmed's half-brother Mustafa — who later became Mustafa I — alive most likely contributed to the transition from a system of succession based on primogeniture to one based on agnatic seniority.

Kösem was popular with the common citizens and esteemed by the ruling elite, holding significant political power and shaping the empire's domestic and foreign policies. Her early years as regent were marked by unrest and instability, but she succeeded in maintaining the state institutions. In 1645, she pressured Sultan Ibrahim to launch a largely unsuccessful naval assault on the Venetian-controlled island of Crete. Afterwards, she had to contend with a Venetian blockade of the Dardanelles, which led to the naval Battle of Focchies in 1649, and in the years that followed, merchant upheavals brought on by a financial crisis.

Some historians openly attribute to Kösem a role in the demise of the Ottoman Empire. However, others argue that her policies can be interpreted as desperate attempts to avert a succession crisis and preserve the Ottoman dynasty. She was posthumously referred to as Vālide-i Muazzama ("magnificent mother"), Vālide-i Maḳtūle ("murdered mother"), Umm al Mu'minīn ("mothers of believers") and Vālide-i Şehīde ("martyred mother").

== Background ==
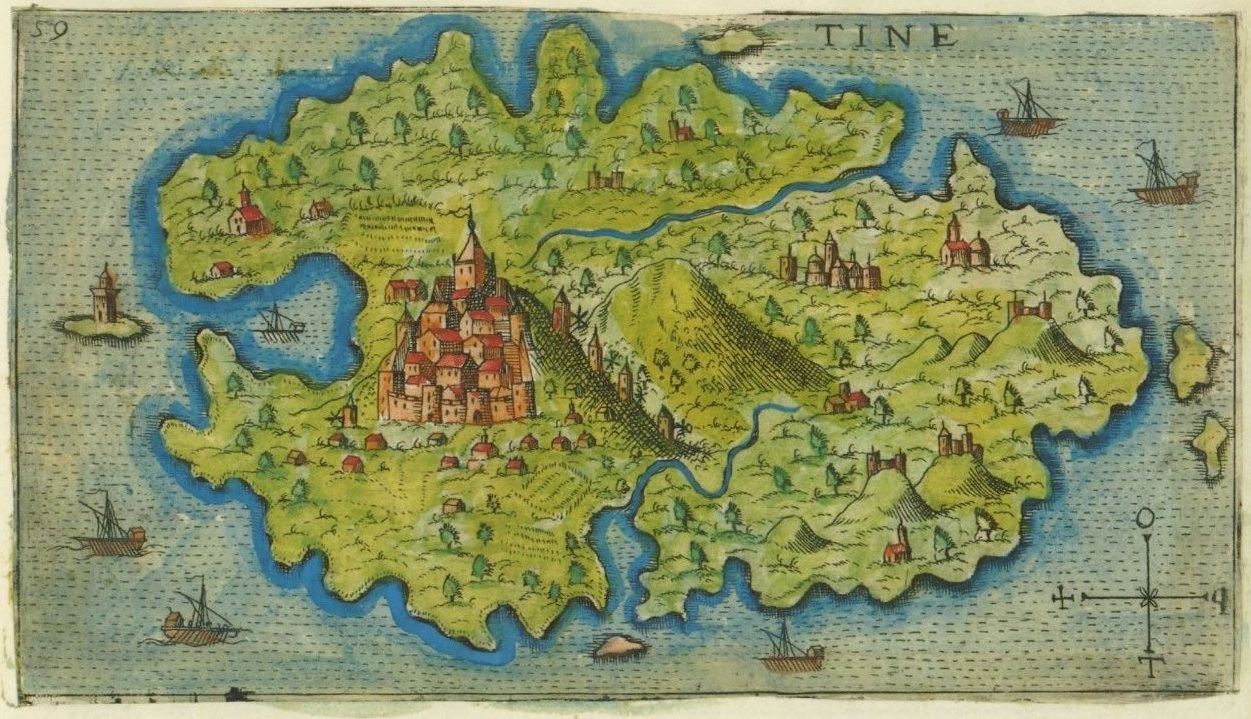
Map of Tinos (Tine) by Giacomo Franco, 1597.

She was born around 1589. It is believed that she was Greek (possibly from Tinos) or Bosnian. Apparently, the first report of Kösem's Greek origin was in a letter by the Italian traveler Pietro della Valle. On 25 October 1615, from Istanbul he wrote about Kösem Sultan: "She was the daughter, if I understood correctly, of a Greek priest, from a distant country or city about two hundred miles from Constantinople". Her Christian name is unknown, but a popular version (as stated in unauthorized sources) is that her name was Anastasia.

In 1604, at the age of 14 or 15, she was kidnapped by Ottoman raiders and bought as a slave in Bosnia by the beylerbey (governor-general) of the Bosnia Eyalet. She was a tall, slender, and appealing girl due to her fresh complexion and the deep brown of her eyes. Her beauty and intelligence were noticed by the kızlar ağa of Sultan Ahmed I's court, who sent her to Constantinople to join a group of other slave girls marked by their striking appearance or intelligence to be trained in the harem of Sultan Ahmed I as an imperial court lady (slave concubine).

In the harem, she was taught Islam, theology, mathematics, embroidery, singing, music and literature. Ahmed was captivated by her beauty and intelligence, and in 1605, she became his haseki. The pair apparently married at some point, as a letter to the Venetians written during Murad IV's reign states that Kösem had been Ahmed's wife; nevertheless surviving contemporary evidence of their marriage are scarce and modern historians treat the marriage as uncertain or debated.

According to the Italian traveler Pietro Della Valle, upon her conversion to Islam, her name was changed to Mahpeyker. After her marriage to Ahmed, he renamed her Kösem, meaning "leader of the herd,” implying her political intelligence and leadership, but it might also mean "hairless," in allusion to her smooth and hairless skin.

Kösem rose to prominence early in Ahmed's reign as part of a series of changes to the hierarchy of the Imperial Harem. Safiye Sultan, Ahmed's once-powerful grandmother and manager of the harem, was deprived of her power and banished to the Old Palace (Eski Saray) in January 1604, and Handan Sultan, Ahmed's mother and valide sultan, died in November of the following year. These two vacancies allowed her to rise to the top of the Imperial Harem hierarchy.

== Haseki Sultan ==
Ahmed favored Kösem above all his consorts, lavishing on her the finest jewels and a stipend of 1,000 aspers a day. In the early years of their relationship, she bore Ahmed at least three daughters: Ayşe Sultan, Fatma Sultan, and Hanzade Sultan. She might have also been the mother of Gevherhan Sultan. As the mother of several princesses, she had the right to arrange suitable dynastic marriages for them. Consequently, Ayşe Sultan was married to the Grand Vizier Nasuh Pasha at the age of four or six and would later marry seven more times, while Gevherhan Sultan was married to Öküz Mehmed Pasha when she was no older than seven, followed by a second marriage to Topal Recep Pasha at 14 or 17. Fatma Sultan and Hanzade Sultan were married the same year, when they were between 15 and 18; Fatma would go on to have six other husbands after her first marriage to Kara Mustafa Pasha.

The Venetian ambassador Simon Contarini, bailo between 1609 and 1612, mentions Kösem in his report in 1612 and portrays her as:

"[A woman] of beauty and shrewdness, and furthermore ... of many talents, she sings excellently, whence she continues to be extremely well loved by the king ... Not that she is respected by all, but she is listened to in some matters and is the favorite of the king, who wants her beside him continually."

George Sandys, an English traveller who visited Constantinople in the early 1610s, believed that she was "a witch beyond beauty". He claimed that the sultan had a "passionate" love for Kösem, emphasizing that this was the result of witchcraft. Sandys went on to characterise her as a woman with "a delicate and at the same time shy nature".

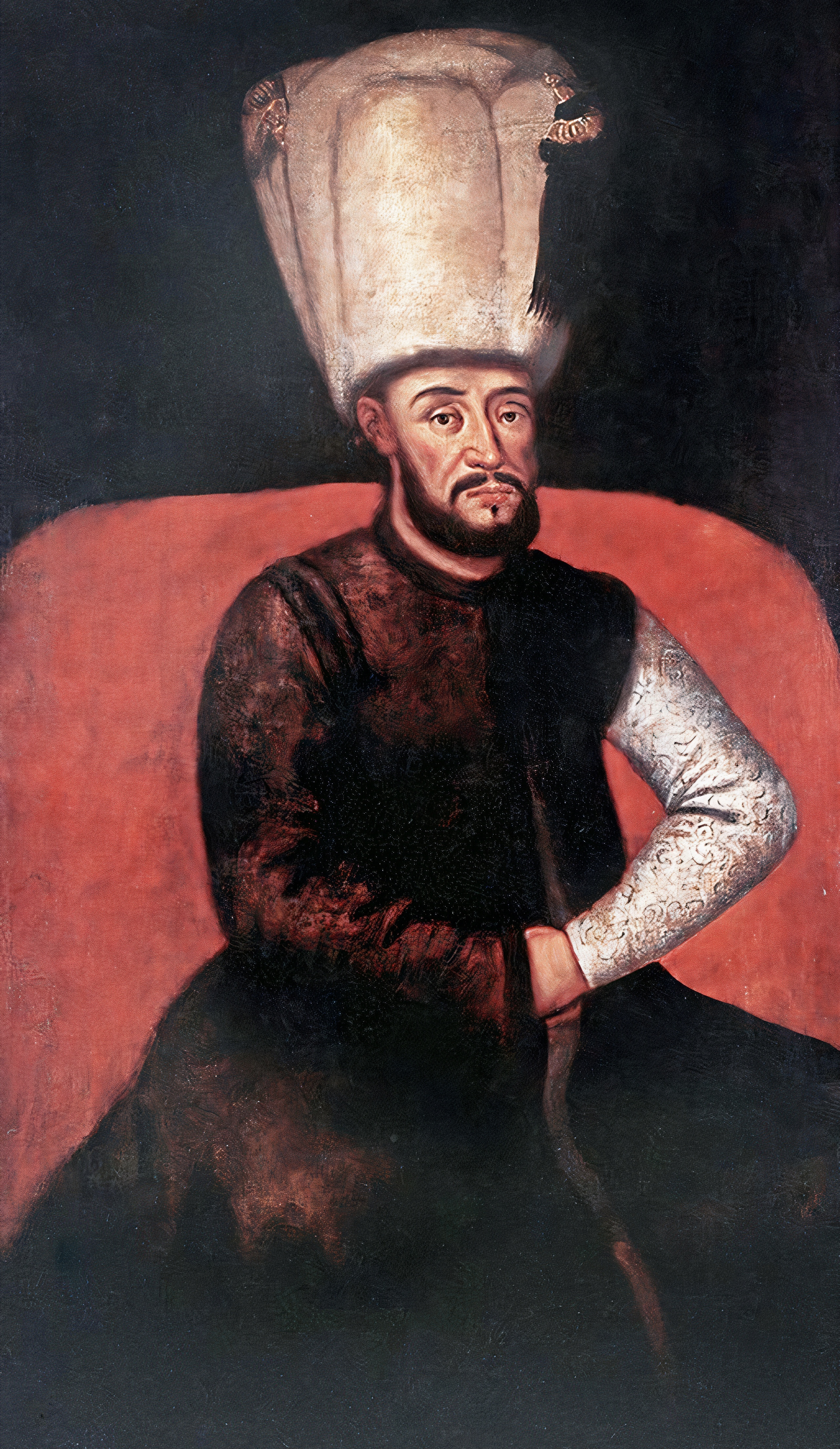
Mustafa I

=== Succession transition ===
Kösem became increasingly involved in matters of succession following the birth of her second son, Murad, in 1612. It has been suggested that she played a role in the shift from a system of primogeniture, where the eldest son inherits the throne, to agnatic seniority, which favored the oldest male of the Ottoman dynasty. Given the Ottoman practice of fratricide, Kösem feared that if Sultan Ahmed's eldest son, Osman—whose mother was Mahfiruz Hatun—ascended the throne, her own sons, Murad, Kasım, and Ibrahim, would be at risk of execution. As a result, she sought to ensure the survival of the sultan's half-brother, Mustafa, to secure her sons' future.

In 1612, the Venetian ambassador Simon Contarini reported that Kösem lobbied to spare Mustafa from execution, ostensibly to protect her own children from the same fate. Although Contarini did not specifically name Kösem, he referred to a "queen" who intervened on Mustafa's behalf. Kösem's strategy aimed to preserve Mustafa's life in the hope that, should he ascend the throne, he would spare her sons. She also leveraged alliances with key figures such as Mustafa Agha, the Agha of the Janissaries, and Grand Vizier Nasuh Pasha to extend her influence over the sultan.

It was also reported that Sultan Ahmed ordered a woman to be beaten for offending Kösem, and this woman may have been Mahfiruz Hatun, who was subsequently exiled to the Old Palace (Eski Sarayı) in the mid-1610s. Following Mahfiruz's exile, Kösem and Osman reportedly became closer, and Kösem allowed him to join her on public outings. During these excursions, Osman enjoyed throwing handful of coins to the passers-by who flocked to see the young prince, while Kösem remained concealed. However, by 1616, Venetian ambassador Cristoforo Valier noted that the sultan restricted Osman's interactions with Kösem, possibly due to concerns about her ambitions for her sons.

In 1614, Grand Vizier Nasuh Pasha, who was married to Kösem's daughter Ayşe Sultan, was executed on the sultan's orders, despite Kösem's efforts to prevent the execution. With the loss of this key ally, Kösem focused her attention on protecting Mustafa.

Kösem's influence over the sultan continued to grow, and by 1616, she was regarded as one of the most powerful figures in the empire. Valier noted her pro-Venetian stance and suggested that the Venetian Republic reward her for her contributions to its interests. Despite her significant influence, Kösem took care not to overshadow the sultan, as he sought to avoid the perception of being under his wife's control, unlike his father. Simon Contarini, the successor of Valier, noted that Kösem deliberately limited her involvement in state affairs in order to retain the sultan's favor.

=== Death of Ahmed I ===
On Ahmed's early death from typhus and gastric bleeding on 22 November 1617, Kösem became the head of a faction that successfully supported his half-brother Mustafa's accession to the throne, probably out of concern for her sons' life, should their older half-brother, Osman, become sultan. She probably preferred to see Mustafa become sultan as he was less likely to see her sons as a threat.

=== Reign of Mustafa I ===
As only the second sultan (after Ahmed I) to ascend the throne with no prior experience of government, Sultan Mustafa I proved feeble and incompetent. He had spent his entire early life in the harem, learning only what the eunuchs and women could teach him, and constantly fearing execution at the hands of the ruling sultans, with several palace officials, particularly the Chief Black Eunuch Mustafa Ağa, nourishing these fears to control him. Eventually, Mustafa Ağa spread stories that he was insane and secured his deposition on 26 February 1618, just 96 days after he ascended the throne. He was replaced by Osman, the eldest son of Sultan Ahmed I and his deceased mother Mahfiruz Hatun.

=== Reign of Osman II ===
Sultan Osman's first act as sultan was to take power away from Mustafa's supporters, as well as those who had secured his accession and planned to rule over him. As a result, Kösem and her eight children and entourage were banished to the Old Palace (Eski Sarayı). Nevertheless, Kösem was able to maintain her haseki status and daily stipend of 1,000 aspers during her retirement. While at the Old Palace, she had the opportunity to meet Safiye Sultan.

In 1619, Osman acted against Ottoman convention by paying Kösem a three-day visit at the Old Palace and taking part in her festivities, thus showing his particular affection for her. He also gave Kösem the income from eight villages to the north-west of Athens; she then incorporated them into her waqf, which provided services to pilgrims traveling from Damascus to Mecca. Kösem may have cultivated this relationship hoping to use her influence over Osman to persuade him to spare her sons. His uncle Mustafa was kept alive, as were Osman's younger half-brothers, protected by Kösem, who were at this time not old enough to pose a threat to Osman's regime. However, even if their relation continued, it did not yield results for the young sultan, whose greatest weakness was not having a valide sultan to lobby on his behalf. He also felt uneasy with Kösem's involvement in state issues.

In 1622, sensing that Osman might still execute Mustafa and his younger brothers, the eunuch corps and the palace soldiery planned a counter-strike, backed by Mustafa's mother, Halime Sultan, and Kösem, who wanted her own children to ascend to the throne. Storming into the harem, they freed Mustafa from confinement in the Kafes. As for Osman, aged only seventeen, he was imprisoned in Yedikule, then strangled by members of the Janissary corps on 20 May 1622, largely through the efforts of Halime.

=== Second reign of Mustafa I ===
In place of Osman, the weak and incompetent Mustafa was restored to the throne with the support of Kösem. While power initially went to Kösem and his mother, the Janissaries and others who had carried out the revolt then reacted violently to the regicide of Osman and killed all those whom they considered responsible while at the same time attempting to protect the remaining sons of Ahmed against the efforts of Halime to eliminate them to protect her son.

In an effort to build her own position, Kösem secured the appointment as grand vizier of Mere Hüseyin Pasha, an Albanian man who presented himself as a reformer, promising to move against the assassins. However, Hüseyin Pasha used the situation to his own advantage, raiding the state treasury for his own benefit on the pretext of punishing those responsible for the regicide of Osman.

During the closing months of Mustafa's second reign, he ordered the execution of everyone involved in Osman's death, including Kösem's sons. But before his orders could be carried out, both Kösem and the eunuch corps intervened and deposed him once more. Kösem eventually reached an agreement with the viziers to install her son Murad as sultan. Mustafa would go on to spend the rest of his life in the Kafes.

== Valide Sultan ==
=== Reign of Murad IV ===
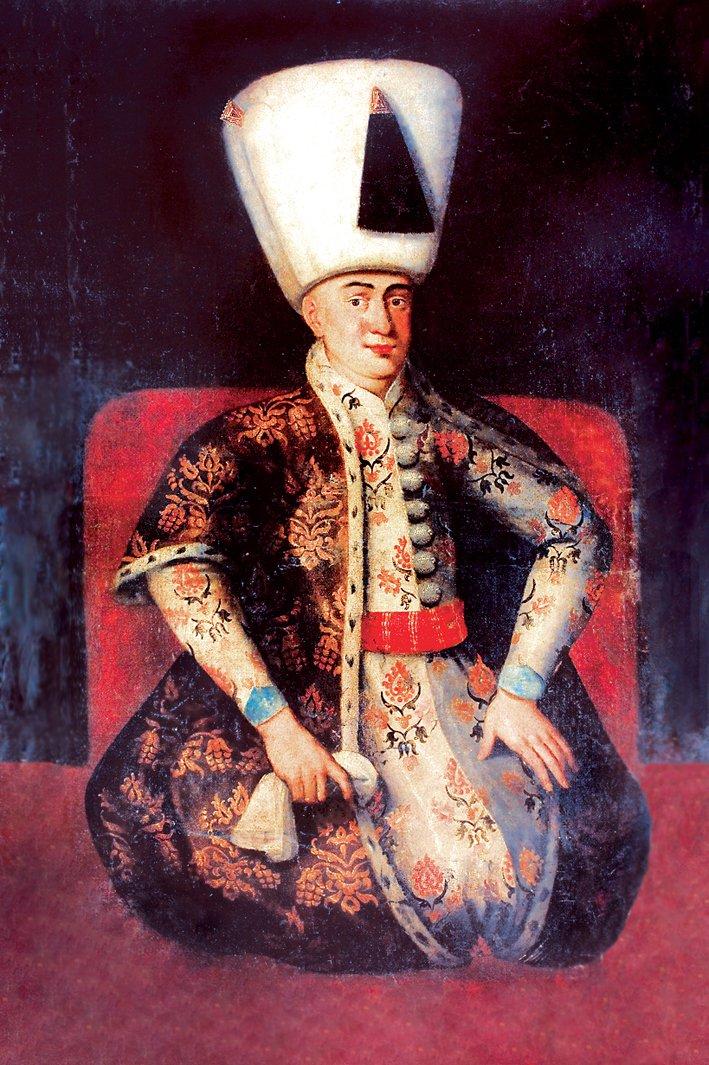
Oil painting depicting the young Murad IV (anonymous, c. 17th century)

Kösem entered the Topkapı Palace with a grandiose ceremonial procession in front of which a thousand dervishes were marching with prayers to celebrate her forthcoming. She was once again thrust into the political arena when her son ascended to the throne on 10 September 1623 as Sultan Murad IV. Since he was a minor, she was appointed not only as valide sultan but also as official regent (naib-i-sultanat), the first in the Ottoman Empire's history.

In 1623, the Ottoman court sent a letter to the Republic of Venice, formally announcing Murad's ascension to the throne. The letter, which formally addressed Kösem, wrote: "Her Majesty the Sultana Valide [...] for the late Sultan Ahmed, whom Allah took with him, was a very important person and he loved her so much that he honoured her by marrying her." The letter further indicates that Kösem would rule in her son's name: "We have great hope and faith in the valide sultan, who - among all women enjoying the position - is distinguished by maturity and virtue of character."

Shortly after Murad's enthronement, a Venetian ambassadorial message remarked on Kösem's political experience:

"[A]ll power and authority [is with] the mother, a woman completely different from that of Sultan Mustafa, in the prime of life and of lofty mind and spirit, [who] often took part in the government during the reign of her husband."

A month before the Venetian despatch, the English envoy Thomas Roe predicted that the new sultan would be "gouemed by his mother, who gouemed his father, a man of spirit and witt."

As per Ottoman tradition, Murad had all his brothers confined in the Kafes, a part of the Imperial Harem where the palace eunuchs kept possible successors to the throne under a form of house-arrest and constant surveillance.

As regent, Kösem effectively ran the empire through her son, Murad, attending and arranging divan (cabinet) sessions from behind a curtain. She was in charge of appointing political figures and overseeing the state's administration, which allowed her to establish connections with statesmen, judges, and other court figures. She would meet with ambassadors from other countries to discuss international treaties. The leading viziers wrote letters directly to her and, in response, Kösem used her kira to compose letters to the viziers.

Kösem seemed to have distinct expectations about her role when she first became regent. According to the Turkish historian Özlem Kumrular:

"It is clear from the request made by the grand vizier (Kemankeş Kara Ali Pasha) that during this period Kösem wanted to be with her underage son in the audience hall and listen to any requests made by dignitaries. She wanted to accompany the sultan and at the same time hold the power in her own hands. The grand vizier stated in a very gentlemanly way that this desire was not in accordance with the law (kanûn): 'My Lord and Ruler, what you are doing is against the law. Please don't even articulate it. After all, I am your faithful servant and I do not wish to be separated from you.'"

In 1623, Kemankeş Kara Ali Pasha was appointed grand vizier. His worst blunder was permitting the Safavid Shah Abbas to capture Baghdad and Erivan in 1624, and then hiding the news from Kösem and Murad, who was twelve years old at the time. Already displeased, Kösem immediately deposed him and had him strangled with the support of the Chief Black Eunuch Mustafa Ağa. He was replaced as grand vizier by Çerkes Mehmed Pasha.

==== Political life ====
Foreign enemies and powerful local notables saw Kösem's rise as an opportunity to undermine the Ottoman state's power and authority. During the early years of Murad's reign, Kösem had to deal with the loss of Baghdad and Erivan during the Ottoman–Safavid War; the rebellion of tribes in Lebanon; the Abaza rebellion in northern Anatolia; the wavering allegiances of governors in Egypt and other provinces; the assertion of independence by the Barbary states; a revolt by the Tatars in Crimea; and raids by marauding Cossacks on the Black Sea coast.

Cossack incursions into the Ottoman Empire were common throughout the early 17th century, disrupting the security of the Black Sea and forcing the Ottomans to consider reinforcing the Bosphorus, especially after the Cossack incursion of 1624. On behalf of her son, Kösem ordered the construction of two fortresses near the mouth of the Bosphorus, one in Anadolukavağı and the other in Rumelikavağı. The fortresses were erected in a single year.

During her regency, Kösem ably restored the state's finances after a period of severe inflation. She also helped stabilise the government by melting down much of the palace gold and silver to pay the Janissaries. When the grand vizier, who was campaigning against the Safavids to recapture Baghdad, ran out of food for the army, he turned to Kösem for assistance. In one letter, she responded to his request, writing: "You say that attention must be paid to provisions for the campaign. If it were up to me, it would have been taken care of long ago. There is no shortcoming on either my or my son's part." In another, she sent good news: "You wrote about the provisions. If I were able to, I would procure and dispatch them immediately. I am doing everything I can, my son likewise. God willing, it is intended that this Friday ten million aspers will be forwarded to Üsküdar, if all goes well. The rest of the provisions have been loaded onto ships." Bayram Pasha, the governor of Egypt and Kösem's son-in-law, wrote to her on a number of issues and she communicated the contents of his letters to the Grand Vizier Ahmed Pasha along with her own thoughts. Among the problems discussed were delays in the provision of gunpowder, the troublesome situation in the Yemen, and shortfalls in the province's revenue (in 1625, Egypt sent only half of its normal revenue because of the ravages of a plague known in Egyptian annals as "the plague of Bayram Pasha"). The extent of the cooperation between Grand Vizier Ahmed Pasha and Kösem is suggested by her frank comment: "You really give me a headache. But I give you an awful headache too. How many times have I asked myself. 'I wonder if he's getting sick of me'? 'But what else can we do?"

In 1625, Murad, who was already critical of his mother's foreign policy, objected to her proposed truce between the Ottoman Empire and Spain. According to a Venetian dispatch of 1625, "the Imperialists and Spaniards declared that the matter was progressing favourably, being actively assisted by the Sultan's mother." A year later, the Venetian ambassador reported that the sultan, "with a prudence beyond his years", was opposed to the truce, as were most leading statesmen except the admiral Recep Pasha and Bayram Pasha, governor of Egypt. He noted that the Spanish "base their hopes on these two and the Sultan's mother and sister." The ambassador was probably aware of the fact that Recep Pasha was married to Gevherhan Sultan and Bayram Pasha to Hanzade Sultan, both of whom were Kösem's daughters. Hans Ludwig von Kuefstein (1582–1656), who led a grand embassy to the Sublime Porte in the late 1620s, describes his negotiations with the kaymakam (a high official of an Ottoman district) in reference to the vast influence of his wife and her mother: "With her and the mother anything can be done and arranged." Nevertheless, the treaty was recalled on the sultan's orders. Kösem is also known to have corresponded directly with Nur Jahan, the chief wife of the Mughal emperor Jahangir.

Imperial princesses were often involved in serial marriages during the century after Suleiman the Magnificent, thereby allowing the Imperial family to establish a network of alliances with the most powerful pashas. Kösem, in particular, used her daughters to help keep her in power for nearly half a century. As she wrote to the Grand Vizier Ahmed Pasha in 1626, a few months before he became her daughter Ayşe Sultan's third husband:

"Greeting and prayers to his excellency the Pasha. I am informed of everything you said in your letter. People simply aren't aware of all the things that are going to get said over a handful of money. What's to be done? Perhaps [something can be done] after the holiday, God willing. As for you, whenever you're ready let me know, and I'll act accordingly. We'll take care of you right away. The princess is ready. I'll do just the same as I did when I sent out my Fatma Sultan. Just write us when you want, and I'll arrange things accordingly. May God bless [the marriage]."

Rejecting an offer of marriage into the imperial family was tantamount to treason, so statesmen could hardly decline a proposed match. Kösem also paired off numerous other women in the Imperial household with men whose standing would be beneficial to her. She also allied herself strategically with the Janissaries.

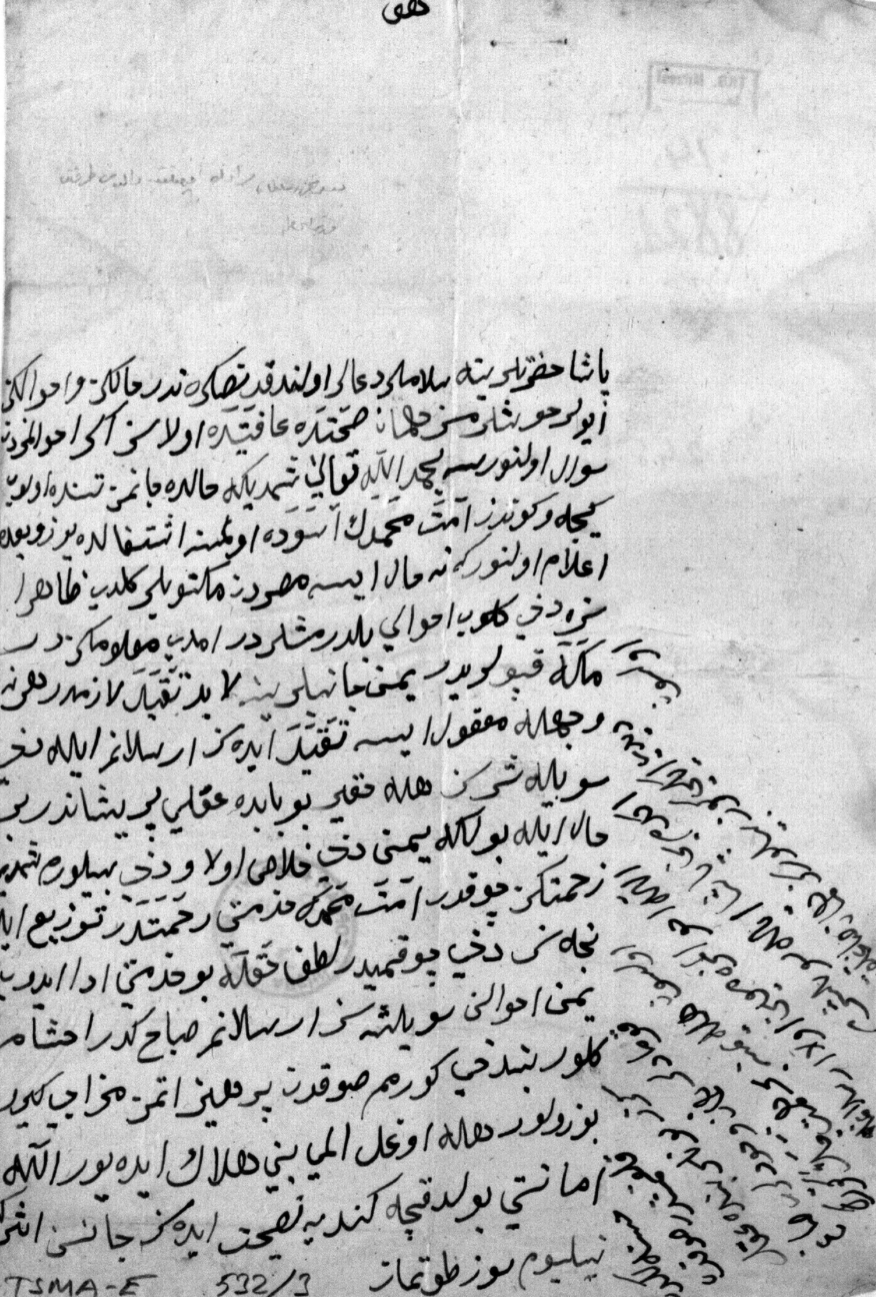
Kösem Sultan's letter to the Grand Vizier Hüsrev Pasha, 1627.

A letter to the Grand Vizier Damad Hilal Pasha, dated 1627, reveals Kösem's concern about two troublesome matters: the security of Yemen, which would break free of Ottoman control in 1636, and the chronic problem of making salary payments, especially to the Janissaries, the frequently unruly Ottoman infantry. The letter also mentions her anxiety about Murad's health and her frustration over her lack of direct control over important decisions:

"Greeting and prayers to his excellency the Pasha. And now, how are you and how are your affairs? Are you fine? May you enjoy good health and well-being. Should you ask after us, thanks to God (may his name be exalted) at present we are devoting body and soul and occupying ourselves night and day with the tranquility of Muhammad's community. And now it is declared: Letters have come from Egypt—apparently to you too—which describe the situation there. Something absolutely must be done about Yemen—it's the gate to Mecca. You must do whatever you can. You'll talk to my son about this. I tell you, my mind is completely distraught over this [the Yemen situation].... It is going to cause you great difficulty, but you will earn God's mercy through service to the community of Muhammad. How are you getting along with salary payments? Is there much left? With the grace of God, you will take care of that obligation and then take up the Yemen situation. My son leaves in the morning and comes back at night, I never see him. He won't stay out of the cold, he's going to get sick again. I tell you, this grieving over the child is destroying me. Talk to him, when you get a chance. He must take care of himself. What can I do—he won't listen. He's just gotten out of a sickbed, and he's walking around in the cold. All this has destroyed my peace of mind. All I wish is for him to stay alive. At least try to do something about Yemen. May God help us with this situation we are in.... You two know what's best."

Another letter expresses her wish that the young sultan should be advised and chastised by the Grand Vizier Hüsrev Pasha, if not by Kösem herself. It also implies that Kösem was getting information about events outside the palace from Murad rather than directly:

"I heard from my son that he had written you and warned you that [your steward] is not a man of good intentions. Is it true that he is giving you a bad name? To a degree, it is a pasha's own men who cause his bad reputation. May God give them the reward they deserve. I'm not referring to anything specific. A friend is one who tells a person his faults to his face. I wouldn't wish ill on any of you. May God protect us all from evil. I wish you would listen to me and have them stop practicing the javelin in the Hippodrome. Why can't they go play in Langa? My son loves it, I lose my mind over it. Whoever says it's good for him is lying. Caution him about it, but not right away. What can I do? My words are bitter to him now. Just let him stay alive, he is vital to all of us. I have so many troubles I can't begin to write them all. You must give him as much advice as you can—if he doesn't listen to one thing, he'll listen to another."

Enraged by his mother's excessive support for the governor of Egypt, Murad moved to break Kösem's ties with her son-in-law Admiral Hüseyin Pasha, the husband of her daughter Fatima, by forcing the dissolution of the marriage. Hüseyin Pasha had benefited from the protection of both the Chief Black Eunuch Mustafa Ağa and Kösem. Murad's move against him may have stemmed from a wish to break free from the influence of his inner palace advisers and exercise authority over the government's most influential officers. Kösem is said to have tried to satisfy her son with a gift of ornately dressed horses and a banquet of ten thousand aspers but Murad was trying hard to keep his mother away from politics, and his actions suggest that he was disturbed by her great influence.

==== Post-regency ====
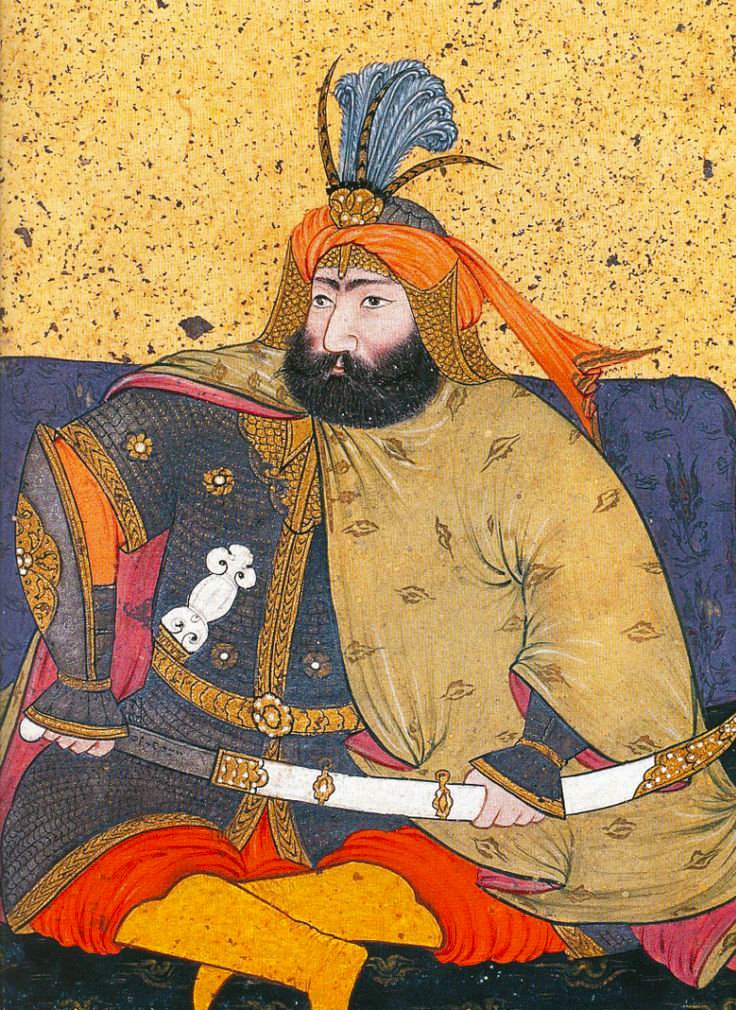
An Ottoman miniature of Murad IV

In May 1632, during an uprising in Constantinople, the Janissaries stormed the palace and killed the Grand Vizier Ahmed Pasha, among others. Perhaps in response to this, as well as fearing that he would suffer the same fate as his elder half-brother Osman II, Murad decided not to allow anyone else to interfere in his administration of the empire, and ordered his mother to sever her contacts with his statesmen, threatening her with exile from the capital if she did not comply. This brought Kösem's nine-year term of office as regent to an end. Having taken power for himself, he immediately sought to replace the men loyal to his mother. He then tried to put an end to the corruption that had grown during the reigns of previous sultans, and that had gone unchecked while his mother was ruling through proxy.

Despite being removed from the seat of power, Kösem continued to run some governmental affairs on behalf of the sultan, since he trusted her to look after his interests during his absences from the capital. She also remained in direct correspondence with him and with Grand Vizier Mehmed Pasha.

In 1634, Murad's execution of the kadi (judge) of Iznik for a minor offence sparked outrage amongst Constantinople's religious hierarchy. When Kösem learned that the Şeyhülislam Ahizade Hüseyin Efendi was allegedly plotting to overthrow the sultan, she sent word to Murad to return to the capital immediately. Ahizade Hüseyin Efendi was strangled before proof of his innocence could reach the sultan. It was the first time of a Şeyhülislam had been put to death in the history of the Ottoman state.

By 1635, the Anatolian countryside had been devastated by the Abaza rebellion and state oppression, resulting in a mass influx of refugees to the capital. Murad responded by ordering the refugees to return to their destroyed homes or face execution, but eventually relented at the insistence of his mother.

In 1638, following the recapture of Baghdad from the Safavids, Kösem was a key figure in the celebrations surrounding her son Murad's triumphal return to Constantinople. Retracing her path after leaving Constantinople to welcome Murad in İzmit, two days' journey from the city, she rode in a carriage draped with gold fabric, its wheels studded, and its spokes coated in gold, preceded by viziers and high-ranking religious authorities on gorgeously caparisoned horses. Twelve additional carriages followed her own, most likely transporting members of the Imperial Harem.

Kösem's principal effort in protecting the dynasty appears to have been dissuading the sultan from executing all his brothers toward the end of his reign. The princes Bayezid (her stepson) and Süleyman (her biological son) were executed during the celebrations over the victory at Erivan (1635) and Kasım, the heir apparent to the throne, was executed during the Baghdad campaign in 1638. One source states that Mustafa was also executed at Murad's command on 20 January 1639.

=== Reign of Ibrahim ===
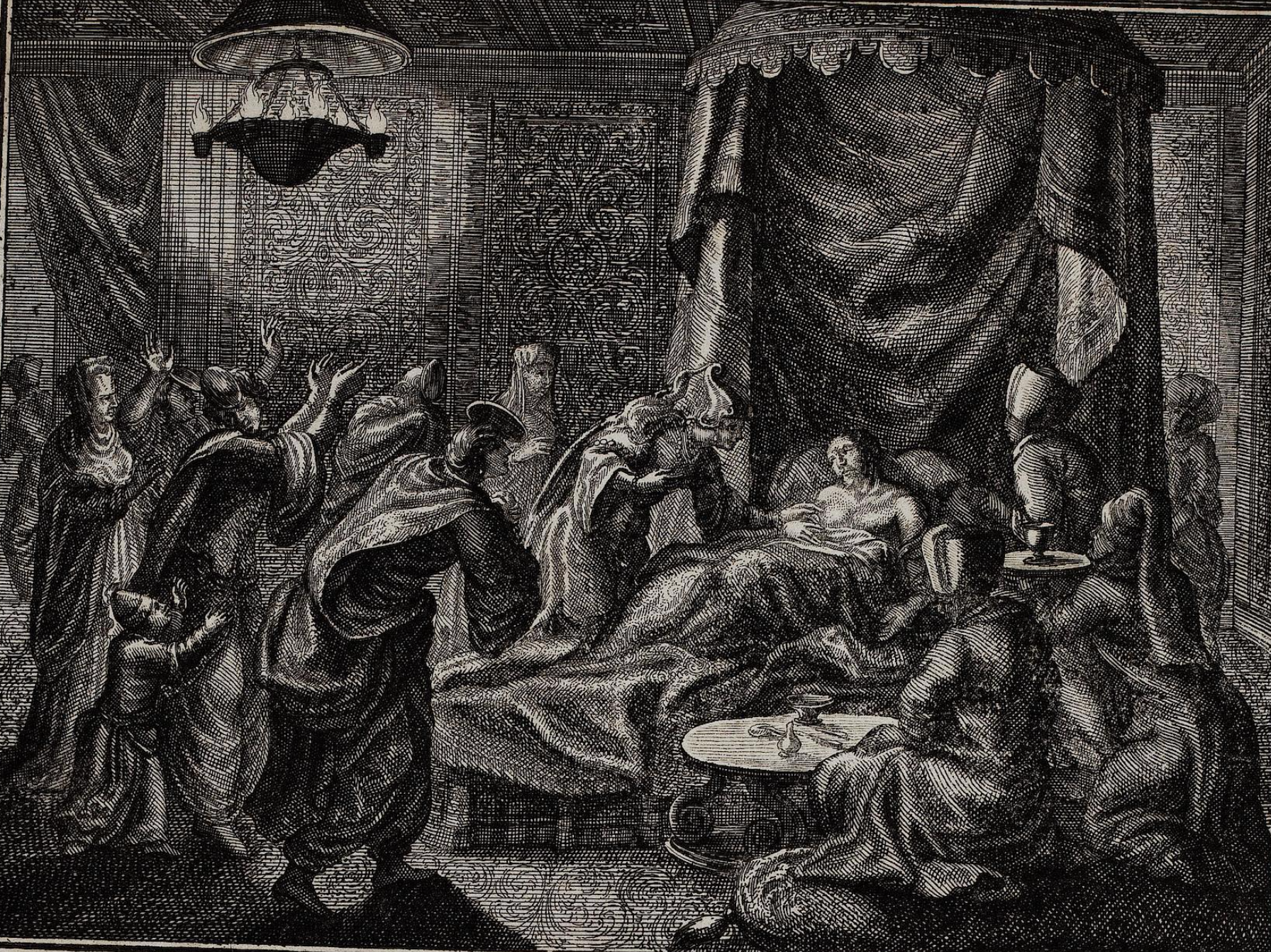
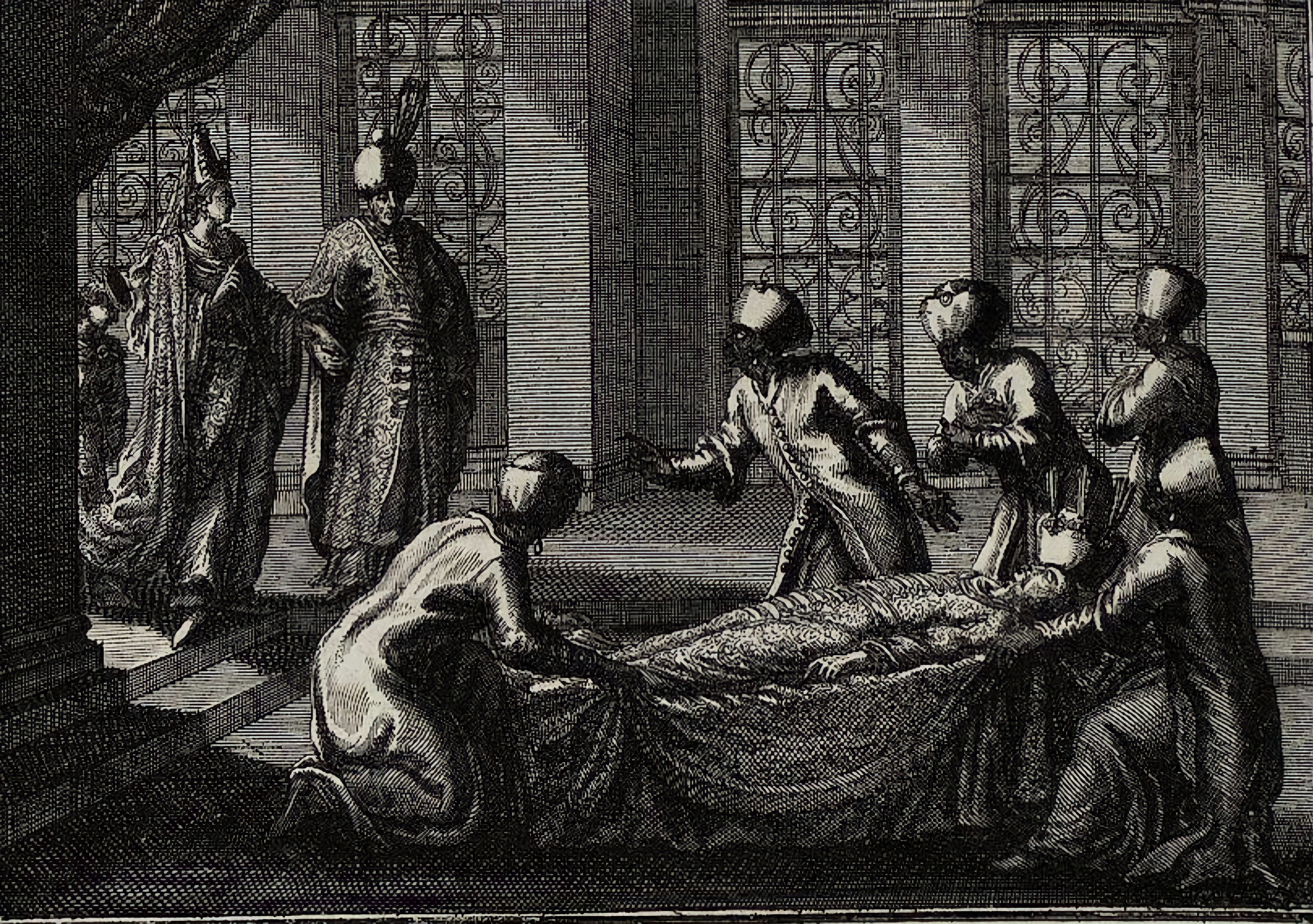
Left: The death of Murad IV, Kösem Sultan can be seen at his bedside. Right: By displaying Murad IV's corpse in front of Ibrahim, Kösem Sultan assures him of his death. (Both engraved by Paul Rycaut, 1694)

Of Kösem's last surviving sons, the mentally unstable Ibrahim, lived in fear of being the next of his brothers to be executed by Murad. On his deathbed in 1640, Murad told his mother of his disdain for his brother Ibrahim, saying that it would be better for the dynasty to end rather than continue with an heir who was insane. Ibrahim's life was only saved by the intercession of his mother Kösem, who argued that he was 'too mad to be a threat'. She thereby saved the Ottoman dynasty from probable annihilation.

Following Murad's death from cirrhosis at the age of 27, Ibrahim was the sole surviving prince of the dynasty. When the Grand Vizier Mustafa Pasha asked him to assume the sultanate, Ibrahim suspected Murad was still alive and plotting to trap him. It took the combined persuasion of Kösem and the grand vizier to make him accept the throne. For instance, Kösem ordered his brother's corpse to be displayed before him and even threatened Ibrahim with 'strangulation, not inauguration' if he refused to be crowned sultan.

Alvise Contarini, who was sent by the Venetian government to Constantinople on the occasion of Ibrahim's accession, presented letters of congratulation addressed to Kösem to Grand Vizier Mustafa Pasha for delivery. However, the grand vizier, Kösem's rival for control of the weak Ibrahim, did not forward the letters, "as if scorning them", reported Contarini who also wrote that the grand vizier "told me that the queen mothers of the Ottomans are slaves of the Grand Signor like all others, not partners or heads of government, like those in Christian countries."

With the accession of Ibrahim, Kösem once again became politically active as his principal advisor. However, she enjoyed a less compatible relationship with the Grand Vizier Mustafa Pasha than she had with the grand viziers of Murad's early reign. Now entering her fourth decade of political involvement, Kösem was a shrewd and experienced politician. The competition between them was reported by the Venetian ambassador Alvise Contarini:

"In the present government, to the extent that this son's capabilities are less, she is held in greater esteem [than at the end of Murad's reign]. And thus, with her commanding affairs within the palace and the grand vizier [commanding] those outside, it happens quite often that these two rulers come up against each other and in doing so take offense at each other, so that one can say that in appearance they are in accord, but secretly each is trying to bring about the downfall of the other."

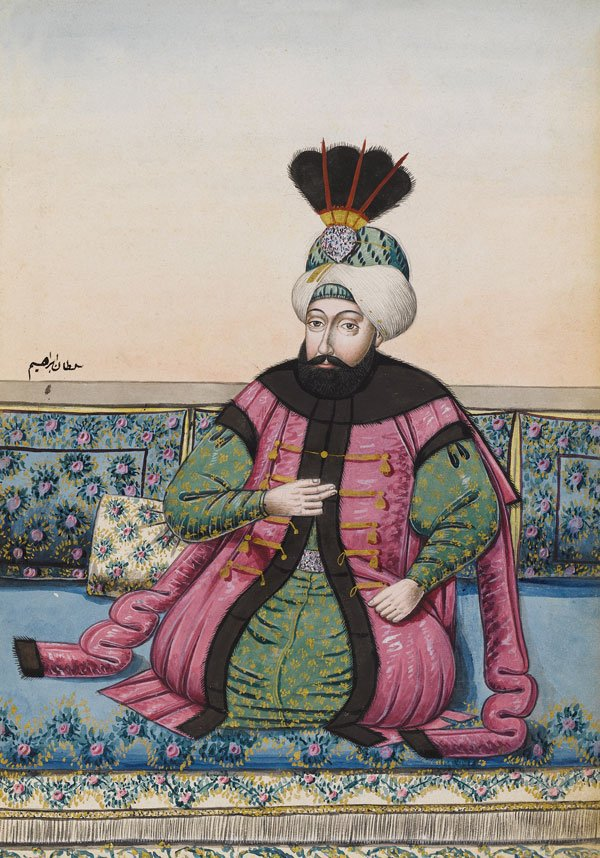
A painting of Sultan Ibrahim the Mad, who reigned from 1640 until his deposition in 1648

Ibrahim's sexual impotency was assessed psychologically, and his mother summoned a number of hodjas to treat him, but all of whom were unsuccessful. In a desperate attempt, Kösem then invited the alleged sorcerer Cinci Hoca (Jinji Hojā) to the palace, after informing her that he had inherited certain 'magic formulas.' After supposedly curing Ibrahim's impotency by offering him a cocktail of aphrodisiacs, pornography and seductive females, the sultan rewarded the hoca with a chief justiceship, the second highest ulama position, an appointment which was one of numerous examples of the overturning of authority and procedure at court.

Kösem tried to remedy the situation by encouraging Ibrahim to distract himself with beautiful concubines supplied to her from the slave market by a confidant named Pezevenk, or the Pimp. This allowed her to gain power and rule in his name as well as to ensure the dynasty's survival. Bobovi, a royal page from Poland who served in the palace from 1638 until 1657, wrote, "It is almost always from among the Sultan Valide's slaves that the sultan chooses his mistresses. For it is only she who has the interest of the loves of her son at her heart. She always searches for beautiful girls to be presented to him."

==== Cretan War ====
The Grand Vizier Mustafa Pasha and Kösem continued to direct the affairs of government throughout the first four years of Ibrahim's reign. Despite his best efforts, however, the grand vizier could not silence and neutralize Kösem, who used his unpopular financial reforms to instigate a rebellion against him. When attempts to dislodge the grand vizier by organizing provincial revolts failed, Kösem allied herself with Cinci Hoca, and together, they persuaded Ibrahim to have the grand vizier executed in 1644. During this time, Kösem managed to significantly increase the pay of the Janissaries, who in return gave her their allegiance. The treasury, however, had run out of money in 1645 when it came time to pay the Janissaries. Kösem tried to get financial assistance from Cinci Hoca, the sultan's chief treasurer, but he declined. She later explained this situation to the Janissaries, writing to them: "I want to distribute your service pay but Cinci Hoca does not allow me", causing the Janissaries to consider Cinci Hoca as an enemy and eventually murdering him.

Due to the shortfall in the Imperial funds, Kösem and her allies urged Ibrahim to launch a naval assault on the Venetian-controlled island of Crete, Venice's largest and wealthiest overseas possession. The campaign was largely unsuccessful, and the venture further drained the treasury.

==== Palace feud ====
Şivekar Sultan, a former slave of Kösem, was an Armenian woman from the Bosphorus village of Arnavutkoy, who is said to have weighed nearly 330 pounds. According to Rycaut, Ibrahim became so infatuated with her that he was unable to deny her anything, which led to her downfall because she incurred the wrath of Kösem: "By these particulars the Queen Mother becoming jealous, one day inviting her to Dinner, caused her to be Strangled, and persuaded Ibrahim that she died suddenly of a violent Sickness, at which the poor Man was greatly afflicted.' She then informed the distraught Ibrahim that Şivekar Sultan 'had died suddenly of a powerful illness." However, other sources suggest that Şivekar Sultan was exiled to Egypt or Chios after Ibrahim's death in 1648. Her fall was a clear sign that Kösem, like others, despised Ibrahim's concubines' excessive influence over political matters. Kösem is also known to have had a strict policy for the eunuchs in the harem, which denied them any influence in the running of the state. Moreover, she quickly got rid of the female lovers of these eunuchs; some of whom were manumitted while others were sent to be sold in the slave market.

Ibrahim also allegedly tried to rape a concubine who spurned him and threatened to stab him with a dagger if he persisted. Their struggle was overheard by Kösem, who reprimanded Ibrahim and allowed the woman to escape the harem.

Meanwhile, Ibrahim's favourites had grown envious of Kösem, encouraging her son to rebel against her. Thus, Ibrahim rejected his mother's authority, urging Kösem to withdraw from the harem to live in a summer house outside Topkapı Palace and then in a house in an Imperial garden in Eyüp. After Kösem's departure, and in another assault on palace protocol, Ibrahim began humiliating his sisters Ayşe, Fatma, and Hanzade, as well as his niece Kaya, subordinating them to his concubines, to whom he gave their land and jewels. He also forced his sisters and niece to work as maids for his wife Hümaşah Sultan. This infuriated Kösem, who turned against Ibrahim.

==== Deposition of Ibrahim ====
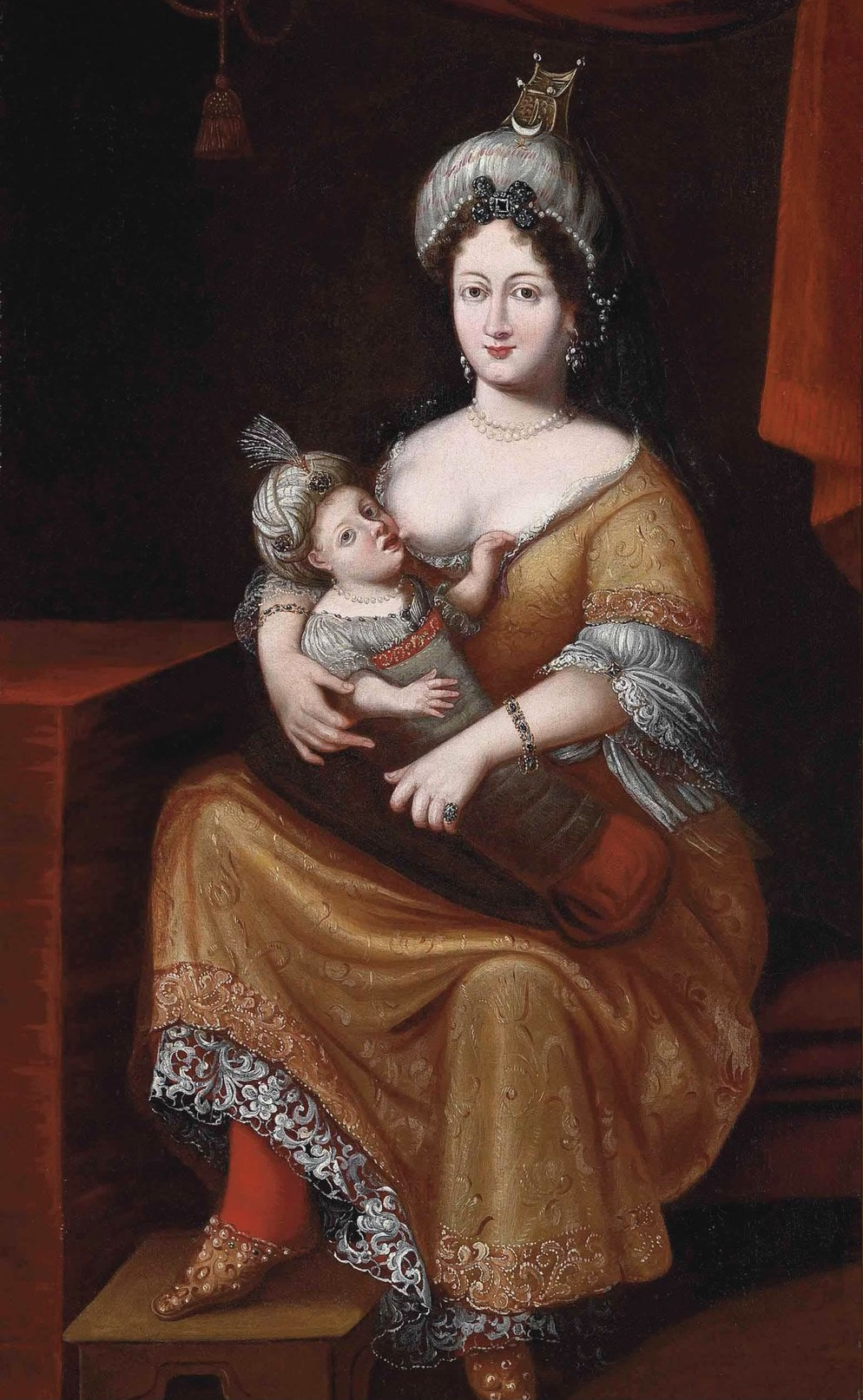
Portrait of Kösem Sultan attributed to Hans Ludwig Graf von Kuefstein after an original, c. 1650–1699. In 1637, Angelo Alessandri, secretary to Venetian envoy Pietro Foscarini, wrote of her: "[This lady], of Greek origin, is now about forty-five years old, very beautiful and has delicate features. A person with a good heart, interesting amusements and pleasures, virtuous, wise and reasonable. Majestic, with wide horizons."

Alarmed by Ibrahim's erratic behaviour, in September 1647, the Grand Vizier Salih Pasha and Şeyülislam Abdürrahim Efendi plotted to depose him. The Şeyülislam deferred to Kösem in the matter of her son's deposition, informing her that all of the statesmen were in favour and that they were prepared to swear allegiance to Ibrahim's son, Mehmed, the eldest prince. But Kösem hesitated, either out of maternal instinct or for fear of losing her own political position. Instead she begged the co-conspirators to leave her son on the throne but under the guardianship of the grand vizier.

Made aware of the attempt to topple him, Ibrahim had the Grand Vizier Salih Pasha executed. Initially, Ibrahim planned to have his mother, whom he suspected of being part of the conspiracy, exiled to the island of Rhodes, However, such indignity was resisted by one of his hasekis and instead Kösem was exiled to the Iskender Çelebi garden in Florya. According to Naima:

"The valide sultan would sometimes speak affectionately, giving counsel to the... padishah. But because he paid no attention to her, she became reluctant to talk with him, and for a long while resided in the gardens near Topkapi. During this time the padishah became angry as a result of some rumors and sent Ahmed Pasha to exile the valide sultan to the garden of Iskender (thereby breaking the hearts of all, great and small.)"

By 1647, heavy taxes, bungled wars, and a Venetian blockade of the Dardanelles that brought the Ottoman capital to the brink of starvation, caused discontent to boil over. In 1648, when the Janissaries and ulama rebelled against Ibrahim, he lost his temper and fled into the arms of his mother, whom he had unwillingly permitted back into the harem in exchange for his protection. The rebels demanded the dethronement of Ibrahim and the enthronement of his eldest son, Mehmed. The Agha of the Janissaries, who were also going to demand the resignation of the unpopular Grand Vizier Ahmed Pasha, warned her to take great care to safeguard the princes. The chronicler Kâtip Çelebi reports that Kösem attended a conference with leading viziers, clergy and others about the impending action. At the anteroom of the third gate, she was draped from head to toe in black silk, while a black eunuch waved a large fan beside her. The Agha of the Janissaries addressed her:

"Gracious mistress, the folly and madness of the Padishah have put the world in danger; the infidels have taken forty castles on the frontiers of Bosnia and are blockading the Dardanelles with eighty ships while the Padishah thinks only of pleasure, debauch and selling offices. The pipes and trumpets and flutes from the palace are drowning the sound of the call to prayer from the minarets of Aya Sofya."

Kösem tried to blame the viziers and clergy for leading Ibrahim astray throughout his eight-year reign. She also upbraided the rebels for agreeing to whatever Ibrahim had desired, stating:

"For all this time [i.e. since the accession of Sultan Ibrahim eight years before, in 1640] you have acquiesced in whatever my son has requested and have served as [unwitting] guides [through your passive attitudes] in the perpetration of all manner of wrong. Not once did you offer your good council or support. Now your foremost concern is to dethrone the sultan and seat in his place a mere stripling. What sort of ill-conceived policy is this?"

Emphasising the need for dynastic allegiance, she went on to ask the clergy: "Wasn't every single one of you raised up through the benevolence of the Ottoman dynasty?" They replied with an imperative drawn from holy law (sharia): "a mentally ill person cannot lead the ummah (the community of Muslim believers.)" At one point the ulama addressed Kösem as umm al-mu'minin, "mother of the [Muslim] believers." This honorific title, given to the wives of Muhammad by Qur'anic revelation, allowed her to extend her maternal function as guardian beyond her son and the dynasty to the Ottoman Empire as a whole. Hanifezade, an Ottoman judge, appealed to her not as a mother but as a stateswoman:

"Oh, royal lady, we have come hither, fully relying on your grace, and on your compassionate solicitude for the servants of God. You are not only the mother of the sultan; you are the mother also of all true believers. Put an end to this state of trouble; the sooner the better. The enemy has the upper hand in battle. At home, the traffic in places and ranks has no bounds. The Padishah, absorbed in satisfying his passions, removes himself farther and farther from the path of laws. The call to prayers from the minarets of the Mosque of Aya Sofia is drowned in the noise of fifes, and flutes, and cymbals from the palace. No one can speak counsel without danger to the speaker: you have yourself proved it. The markets are plundered. The innocent are put to death. Favorite slaves govern the world."

In one last effort, Kösem said, "All this is the doing of wicked ministers. They shall be removed; and only good and wise men shall be set in their stead." "What will that avail?" replied Hanifezade, "Has not the Sultan put to death good and gallant men who served him, such as were Mustafa Pasha and Yusuf Pasha, the conqueror of Canea?" "But how," urged Kösem, "is it possible to place a child of seven years upon the throne?" Hanefizade answered: "In the opinion of our wise men of the law, a madman ought not to reign, whatever be his age; but rather let a child, that is gifted with reason, be upon the throne. If the sovereign be a rational being, though an infant, a wise Vizier may restore order to the world; but a grown-up Sultan, who is without sense, ruins all things by murder, by abomination, by corruption, and prodigality." They debated for hours until the soldiers lost patience and demanded that if she did not surrender the prince they would storm the harem and forcibly take him.

After assenting to their setting up the emerald throne before the gate, Kösem 'tucked up her skirts in fury' and went inside to get the prince. Some time later, with 'apparent distress and hatred in her face' she brought the boy out, who was dressed and prepared for his enthronement, asking, "Is this what you wanted? Here he is, see what you can do with him!" In exchange, the Janissaries promised not to murder Ibrahim, but merely return him to the confinement of the Kafes. Kösem attempted to justify her decision by writing to the Grand Vizier Ahmed Pasha: "In the end he will leave neither you nor me alive. We will lose control of the government. The whole society is in ruins. Have him removed from the throne immediately." On 8 August 1648, Ibrahim was dethroned and imprisoned in Topkapı Palace.

== Büyük Valide Sultan ==
=== Reign of Mehmed IV ===
When some government official insisted that Mehmed be sent to be enthroned and receive the Janissaries' and sipahis' (cavalryman) oath of allegiance at the Blue Mosque out of concern for the young sultan's safety, Kösem demanded that they instead come to the palace, pointing out that no sultan had ever been enthroned in a mosque before. Her purpose was undoubtedly in part to force the situation so that she could have some influence over the outcome.

Ten days after Ibrahim's dethronement, one of the first imperial decrees issued in the name of the child sultan declared that Ibrahim, living under house arrest, was stirring insurrection with the assistance of his loyal followers, including harem eunuchs and palace guards, some of whom wished to reenthrone him. The newly appointed Grand Vizier Mehmed Pasha asked the Şeyhülislam Abdürrahim Efendi for a fatwā sanctioning Ibrahim's execution which was granted, with the message: "If there are two caliphs, kill one of them." Kösem, weeping while praying before the mantle of Muhammad, responded to the decision by asking, "Who gave this man the evil eye?" She also articulated the fact that only she could make the final decision whether the sultan lived or died: "They said my son Ibrahim was not suitable for the sultanate. I said 'depose him.' They said his presence is harmful, I said 'let him be removed', then I said 'let him be executed.' If anyone is under my protection, it is my son."

The extent in which Kösem was involved in Ibrahim's execution has always been a source of debate. Joseph von Hammer-Purgstall, an Austrian historian, believes that, to the extent that she was involved, it was motivated by concerns for the Ottoman state. Nevertheless, she was forced to give her consent to Ibrahim's execution. As officials watched from a palace window, Ibrahim was strangled on 18 August 1648. His death was the second regicide in the history of the Ottoman state.

According to Ottoman customs, the mother of the deceased sultan would retire to the OId Palace and give up her office upon the accession of a new sultan. Kösem herself requested to retire from politics, but her request was denied by the political and religious leaders who deposed Ibrahim, forcing her to reconsider her decision and continue her career as Sultan Mehmed IV's regent because she had more expertise and knowledge of the state's running than Mehmed's own twenty-one-year-old mother, Turhan Sultan. According to Abdülaziz Efendi, then the chief justice of Rumeli and a central figure in the dynastic upheavals of the time, it was considered prudent to appoint the more experienced female as regent in contravention of tradition:

"It being an ancient custom that upon the accession of a new sultan the mother of the previous sultan remove to the Old Palace and thus give up her honored office, the elder valide requested permission to retire to a life of seclusion. But because the loving mother of the [new] sultan was still young and truly ignorant of the state of the world, it was thought that if she were in control of government, there would result the possibility of harm to the welfare of the state. Therefore, the elder valide was reappointed for a while longer to the duty of training and guardianship, and it was considered appropriate to re-new the assignment of crown lands to the valide sultan."

Thus Kösem was reinstated as regent by Mehmed's council and was entrusted with his training and guardianship.

Historians have recorded that Kösem would usually sit in the palace lodge with her grandson Mehmed, handing down decisions. She would also sit beside the sultan, concealed behind a curtain, if his presence was needed at the divan. In one instance, she scolded a vizier in an abrasive tone: "Have I made you vizier to spend your time in gardens and vineyards: Devote yourself to the affairs of the empire and let me hear no more of your deportments!"

==== Rivalry with Turhan Sultan ====
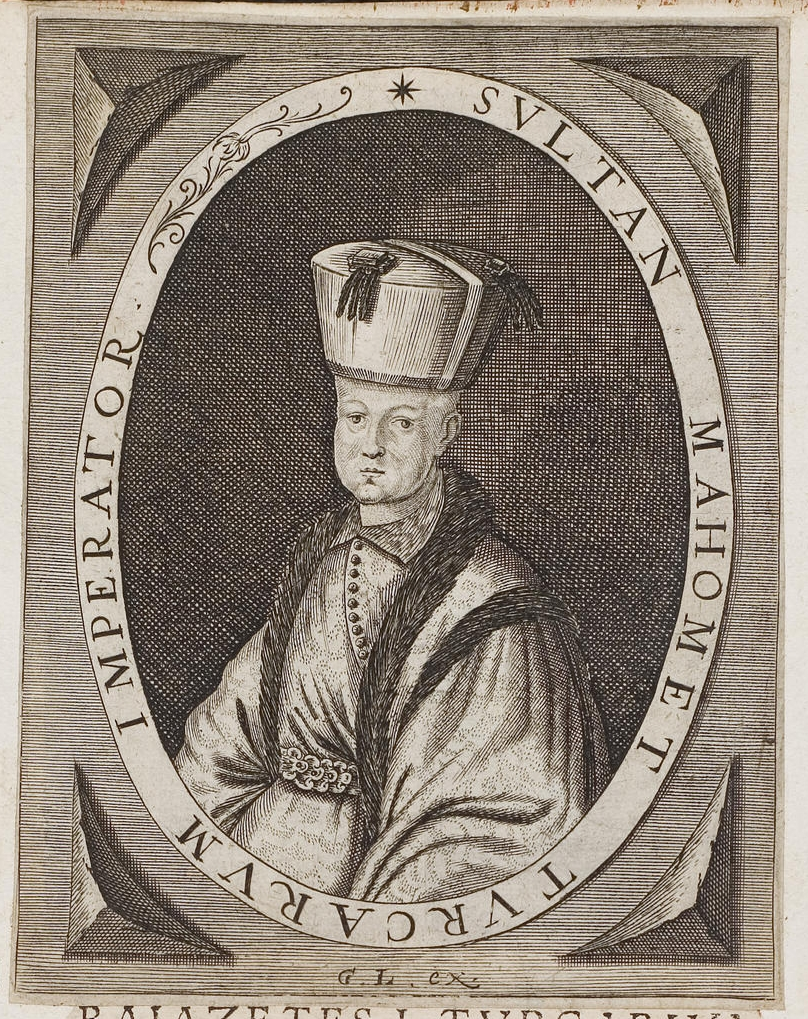
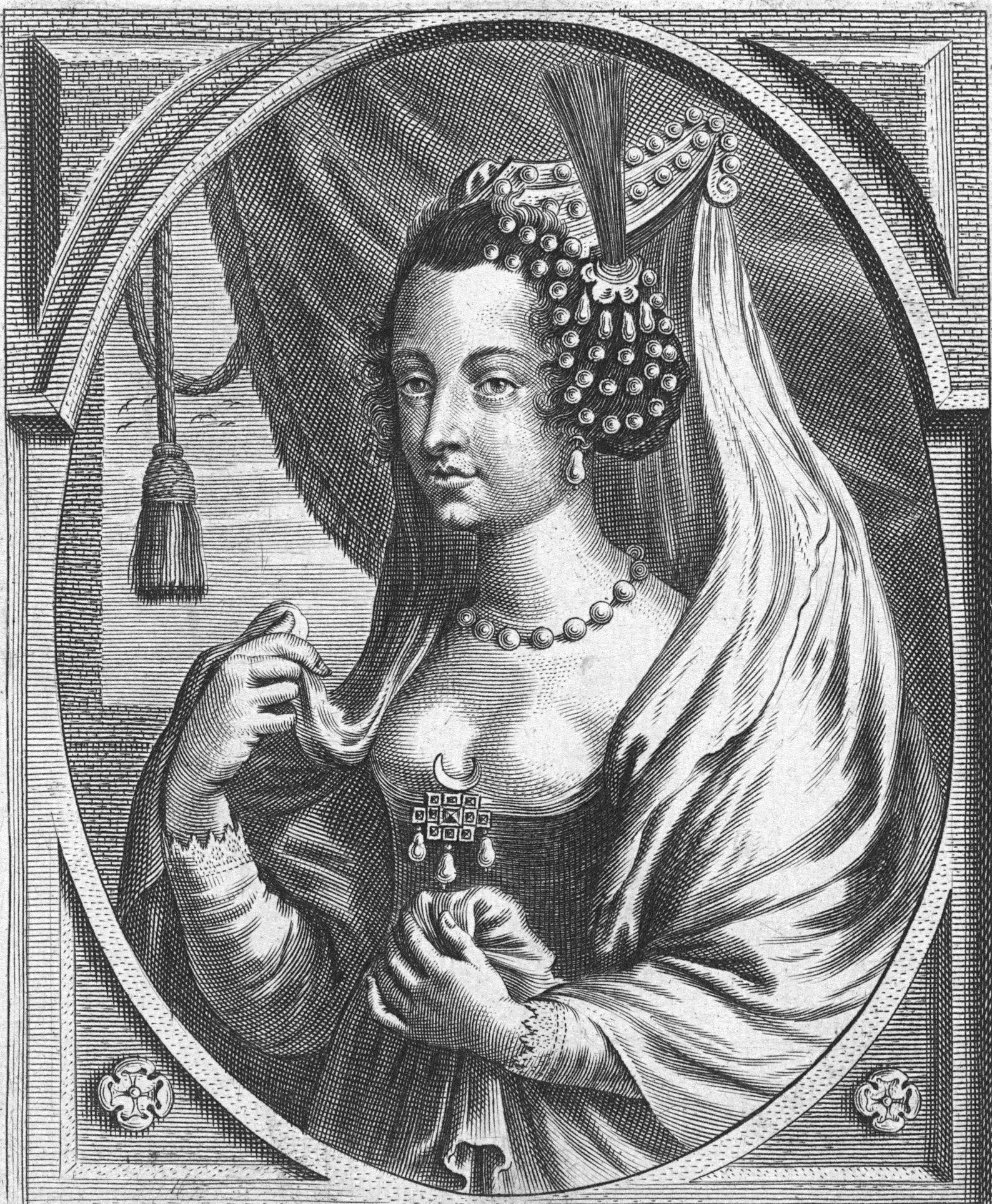
Left: Engraving of the young Sultan Mehmed IV (c. mid-17th century) Right: Engraving of Turhan Sultan as valide sultan (c. 19th century)

Mehmed's mother, Turhan Sultan, was presented to Kösem as a gift from Kör Süleyman Pasha, the Khan of Crimea, when she was around 12 years old, so it was presumably Kösem who offered Turhan to Ibrahim as a concubine. The post of valide sultan and regent should have gone to Turhan when her son Mehmed became sultan, but she was passed over because of her youth and inexperience. Turhan must also have resented the stipend of 2000 aspers that she received in comparison with Kösem's 3000 aspers and so she began to assert what she saw to be her rightful authority. According to English historian Paul Rycaut: "The two queens were exasperated highly against each other, one to maintain the authority of her son and the other her own." In 1649, Kösem promoted herself to the non-existent rank of büyük ("elder") valide sultan.

==== Battle of Focchies aftermath ====
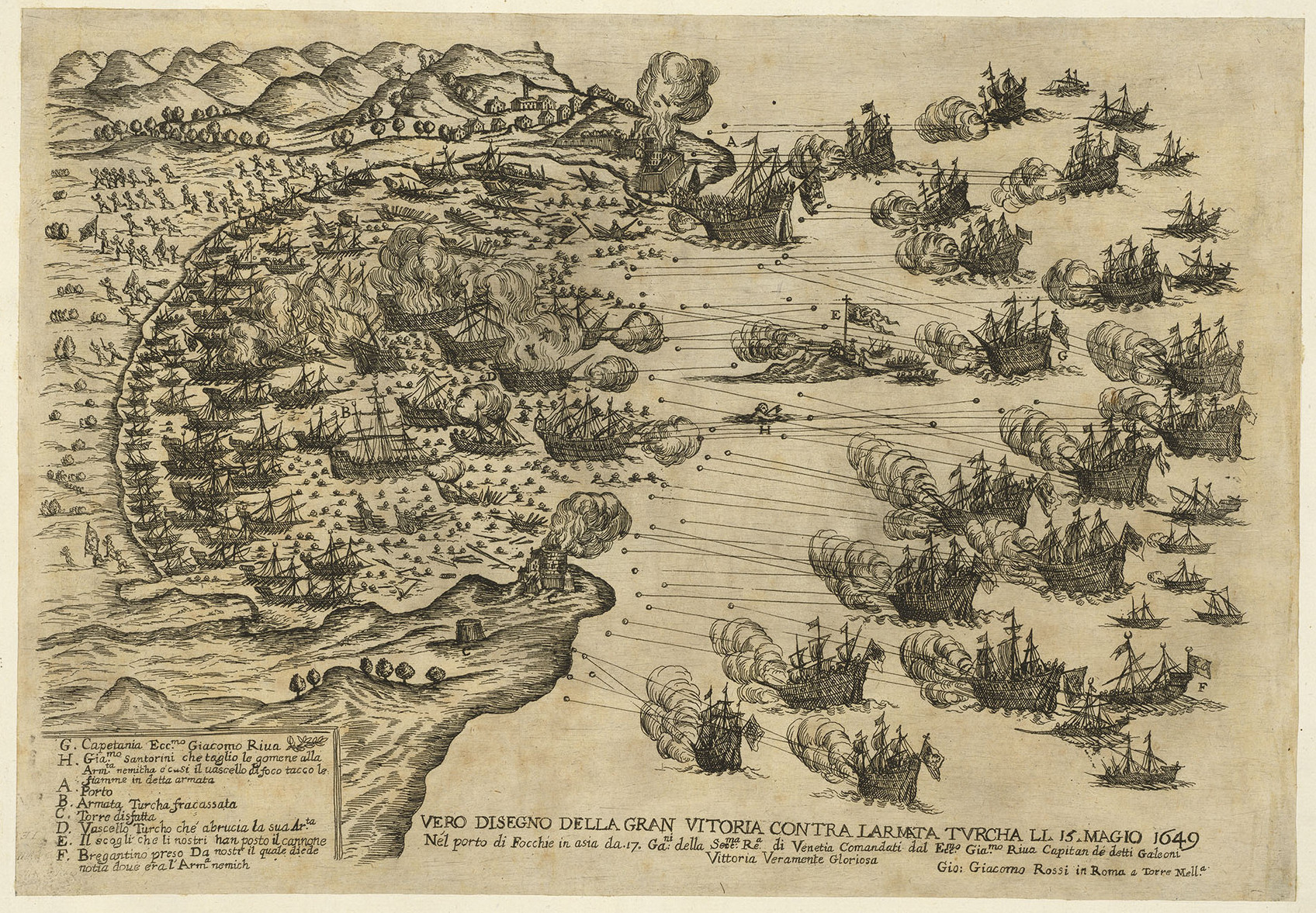
The naval Battle of Focchies was fought on 15 May 1649 between the Ottomans and the Venetians, with the Knights of Malta combining with hired Dutch and English ships, commanded by Giacomo Riva, resulting in a Venetian victory (engraving by Giovanni Giacomo de Rossi, 17th century)

Kösem and the Grand Vizier Mehmed Pasha grew in enmity after Mehmed's accession to the throne. The grand vizier appears to have regarded himself as regent as well as "temporary ruler." According to Naima, the grand vizier was misled by "certain would-be doctors of religion" who quoted legal texts to the effect that the guardian of a minor sultan was entitled to exercise sovereignty prerogatives; as a result, he resented Kösem's control over the government, hoping that he, rather than the sultan's grandmother, would act as regent. He once bragged: "The soldiers of this exalted state respect only the honour of inherited nobility." His misogynistic ally, Şeyhülislam Abdülaziz Efendi, favored the logic of ‘reasonable and legal’ proposals of ‘rational men’ to the ‘anger and wrath’ of the valide sultan. The Şeyülislam overestimated the value of the valide sultan's favor. He assessed certain palace expenses, and when he encountered Kösem, he did not think twice to utter nasty comments to her. The mother of Mehmed, Turhan Sultan, was still an inexperienced woman, therefore Abdülaziz Efendi's attempt to have Kösem relocated to the Old Palace was unsuccessful. Despite failing, he did not hesitate to take chances in the future as he fought against the rule of women in the palace.

According to the French historian Alphonse de Lamartine, in May 1649, following the defeat of the Ottomans in the Battle of Focchies, Kösem presided over the divan from behind a curtain, with the young sultan present. The Grand Vizier Mehmed Pasha expressed disappointment at the difficult circumstances to the sultan, but in a speech, Mehmed said to the grand vizier, "Go, you are not worthy of being grand vizier; give back the seal of the state. And you," he added, handing the seal to Kara Murat Pasha, the Agha of the Janissaries, "take it; I will see what you can do." Then, the Şeyülislam Abdülaziz Efendi turned to the sultan and asked, "My dear, who taught you that, at your age?" This insolence made Kösem's anger boil over and she listed the former grand vizier's shortcomings, including his alleged plans to assassinate her:

"When certain imperial commands have been issued, they have said [to the sultan], 'my dear, who taught you to say these things?' Such patronizing behavior towards sultans is impermissible! And what if the sultan is instructed? It is the voice of the world that taught him. [The children] themselves know our misfortunes and speak out against your iniquities, in spite of all the treasures you have extorted and lavished you have obtained. You want to kill me, but you haven't done so yet. I know, because my position [bothers] you. Thanks to God, I have lived through four reigns and I have governed myself for a long while. The world will be neither reformed nor destroyed by my death. Sometimes they want to [kill] me, [and] sometimes they want to enslave [the sultan]; but the time has come to choose between you and him.”

In Naima's words, Abdülaziz Efendi "drowned in the sea of mortification." Kösem gave the newly appointed Grand Vizier Murat Pasha orders to have Mehmed Pasha and his allies executed.

According to Finkel, Kösem "continued to be the ruling personality... tutoring him [Kara Murat Pasha] in the decisions handed down."

==== Merchant rebellions ====
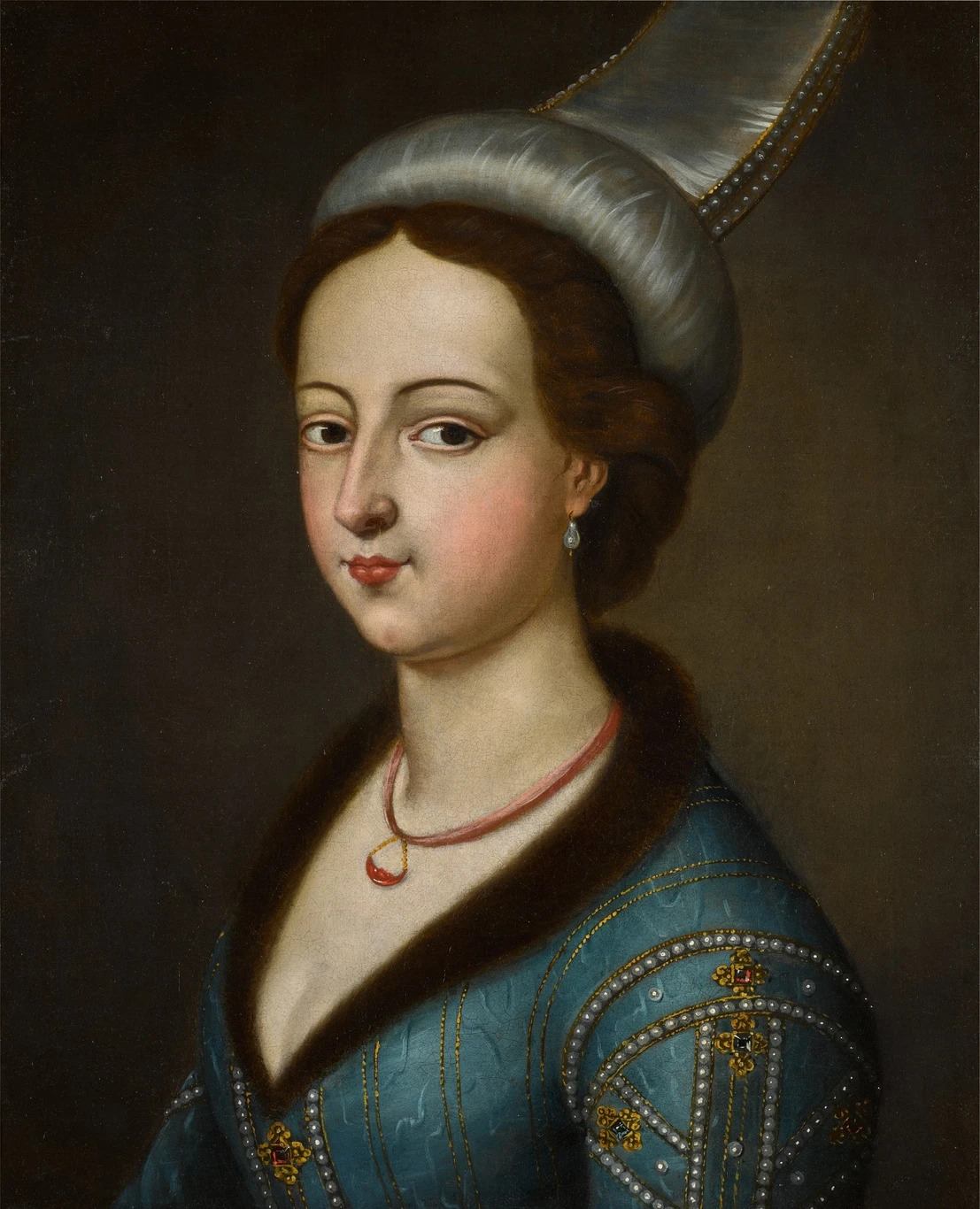
A 17th century European rendition of Kösem Sultan, Venetian school, c. 17th century

In 1650, Constantinople's merchants rose in rebellion. The treasury was once again empty, and traders were obliged to accept faulty coins in place of good ones to pay the Janissaries. They retaliated by closing their shops and taking to the streets, demanding the dismissal of Grand Vizier Murat Pasha, the Agha of the Janissaries, as well as the execution of Janissary commanders. A large gathering of 15,000 artisans and merchants marched to Şeyülislam Abdülaziz Efendi's residence, weeping and ripping their garments, and complaining that their protests had gone unheard, that they had been subjected to harmful impositions such as heavy monthly taxes, and that they feared debtors' prison. The Şeyülislam sympathised with their plight and intended to ask the sultan to "cancel evil innovations", but instead he was encircled and forced to accompany them to the palace. To give them credibility, they put the reluctant Şeyülislam on horseback at the front. The Hippodrome was packed with 20,000 men. They entered the Hagia Sophia compound, hoping to meet the sultan there, but were instead admitted to the palace, marching as far as the Gate of Felicity and passing on to voice their grievances. Kösem arrived in a fury, demanding, "Why did you not turn back these people, instead bringing them to the palace?" The Şeyülislam claimed, "We did not bring them, they brought us."

The sultan then asked what was causing the uproar and advised the Şeyülislam to return the next day when the merchants would submit their grievances to him, but they responded, "We will not take a step backward until we receive what we deserve." Relying on the advice of his grandmother, the sultan then asked to meet Grand Vizier Murat Pasha. However, Murat Pasha preferred to return his seal of office rather than appear in front of him. Claiming that the room where they were meeting was claustrophobic, Kösem stepped outside and gave Melek Ahmed Pasha, the spouse of her granddaughter Kaya Sultan, the seal of office.

On 5 August 1650, Melek Ahmed Pasha was appointed grand vizier, but his term of office was cut short a year later because of his incompetence in dealing with another uprising of the merchants. Kösem proposed that former Grand Vizier Murat Pasha replace Melek Ahmed Pasha, but the elderly Siyavuş Pasha, who was favoured by Turhan Sultan was instead appointed.

==== Palace coup ====
The late 17th-century author Dervish Abdullah Efendi claimed that the Chief Black Eunuch Süleyman Ağa deliberately turned Kösem and her daughter-in-law, Turhan, against each other: "A black eunuch called Uzun Süleyman [said to Kösem], "My lady, the Junior Mother [Turhan] covets your wealth. You should guard yourself well, because she is determined to kill you one night. I have experienced your kindness previously, and for this reason, I have told you", and he began to cry. When [Kösem] asked, "What is the remedy for this?" he answered, "We have all agreed to depose Sultan Mehmed and enthrone [Prince] Suleiman. They are both your [grandsons]. This treachery must be stopped immediately." He then went to Turhan and told her, "Soon they are going to kill all your black eunuchs and imprison you, for I have learned that the Senior Mother's eunuchs have agreed to depose Sultan Mehmed and enthrone [Prince] Suleiman."

Political figures who resented Kösem's alliance with the Janissaries encouraged Turhan to resist the regent's monopoly of power and patronage, and she began to plot against Kösem. Courtiers then took sides: The Janissaries, under the command of Şahin Ağa, who was rumored to be in a love affair with Kösem, remained loyal to her, while most of the harem and the palace eunuchs, the Chief Black Eunuch Süleyman Ağa and the Grand Vizier Siyavuş Pasha, favoured Turhan. According to Naima, once Kösem realised this, she began to plot to dethrone Mehmed and replace him with his younger half-brother, Suleiman whose mother, Aşub Sultan, she thought a more complaisant rival; her plan to swap one child sultan for another was primarily geared towards eliminating Turhan. Naima further notes that Kösem secretly asked the palace guards to leave the gates open so that Janissaries could sneak in and kill Turhan. She also allegedly gave two bottles of poisoned sherbet to Üveys Ağa, the head helva (sweets) maker in the palace kitchen, to give to the child sultan and promised to promote him if he succeeded in poisoning the child sultan. The day before the plot was due to be carried out, however, one of Kösem's slaves, Meleki Hatun, betrayed it to the Chief Black Eunuch Süleyman Ağa.

Wojciech Bobowski's book Saray-ı Enderun' (Life at the Ottoman Court) depicted the organisation and daily life of the Ottoman Court. He wrote some observations on Kösem's attempt to poison Sultan Mehmed IV in 1651:

"A true relation of the designes managed by the old queen, wife of sultan Ahmed, and mother of sultan Murad and sultan Ibrahim, emperours, against her grandchild sultan Mehmed Chan who now reignes, and of the death of the said queen and her complices; written by me Albert Bobovius, then musitian of the seraglo and a spectatour of these things."

Süleyman Ağa promptly invited the Grand Vizier Siyavuş Pasha to the palace and told him that Kösem was usually in bed at that time, being entertained by 'her Eunuchs, and Favourites, with Musick, Singing, and other unusual delights'. Süleyman Ağa and the sultan's eunuchs then attempted to force their way into Kösem's quarters after consultation with the grand vizier. According to a report from 1675, Kösem's entourage initially repulsed them:

"But Süleyman Agha being a stout man drew his Dagger and struck the chief Chamberlain Bash Kapa Oglar on the face, upon which the other Eunuchs who accompanied Süleyman entered furiously with their Daggers, at which the Eunuchs of the Queen flying, she remained alone in the Chamber, where she was committed to the Custody of the [sultans] Eunuchs. The fugitive Eunuchs would immediately have escaped out of the Seraglio, but the Gates were first shut by order of Süleyman Agha, so that they with all other favourites of the said Queen were taken and secured in safe hands."

Süleyman Ağa and his accomplices moved so silently and rapidly that most of the palace remained asleep. They also shared a sign language so that no one could hear their voices. Meanwhile, they summoned their forces to secure the palace against the Janissaries. The men went to Turhan's quarters and told her of the conspiracy to poison the child sultan, after which she begged Süleyman Ağa to protect him.

A procession from Turhan's quarters along with Süleyman Ağa's group then marched to the throne room and placed Mehmed on the throne. The guards awakened their sleeping comrades along with forty of their officers who asked what they could do to show their loyalty. Süleyman Ağa responded:

"Hereat Süleyman Agha said, He that eats the [sultans] bread, should apply himself to the [sultans] service; we suffered the Traitors to destroy Sultan Ibrahim, and now they would also take this out of our hands; To you it belongs, who are His Majesties Principal Servitors, to afford him your utmost assistance. Eiginsi Mustapha Passa, Sword-bearer to the [grand vizier], and chief of the Presence Chamber, a man of a Lions heart and undaunted resolution, understood something formerly of the bad inclinations of the Old Queen [Kösem] toward the [sultan], readily replied, Great Master be not troubled, tomorrow you shall see (God willing) the Heads of your Enemies at your feet."

Kösem was accused of being the instigator of the plot against the sultan, and his chief ministers urged that she be executed, preferably with the sultan's consent. The Grand Vizier Siyavuş Pasha said to the sultan: "My sultan, the will of god is that you consign your grandmother into the hands of justice, if you would have these mutinies appeased; a little mischief is better than a great one; there is no other remedy; god willing, the end shall be prosperous." The sultan then summoned a mufti, who decreed that the 'Old Queen' should be strangled "but neither cut with a sword nor bruised with blows", Kösem's death warrant was signed by the trembling hand of the child sultan.

== Assassination ==
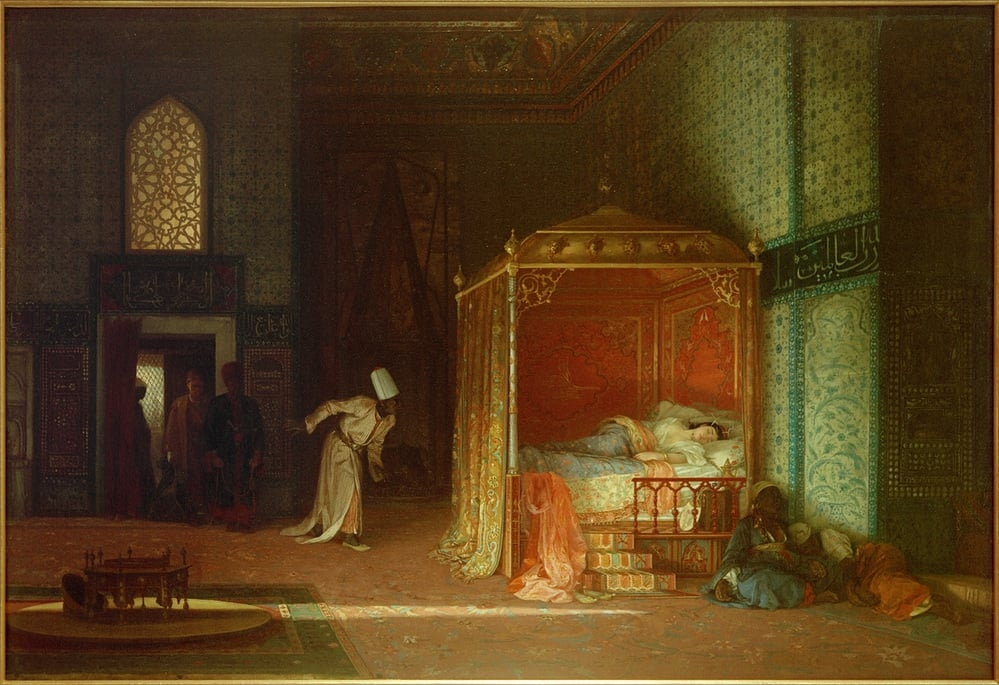
Drama in a Harem (by Stanisław Chlebowski, 1870)

On the 16th day of Ramadan, the night of 2 September 1651, the Chief Black Eunuch Lala Süleyman Agha and his armed men, consisting of over 120 armed black and white eunuchs, descended on the palace in support of the sultan, proceeded to Kösem's quarters where they encountered over 300 armed Janissaries and loyal black eunuchs. With Süleyman Ağa's outnumbered forces launching an assault, the opposing party fled. Hearing the commotion, Kösem thought the Janissaries had arrived, so she called out from behind the door, "Have they come?" Süleyman Ağa replied, "Yes, they have come," hoping to deceive her. Kösem, on the other hand, recognised his voice and went mad, stuffing her precious jewels into her pockets and fleeing along the Golden Way and through the Court of the Black Eunuchs to the Dome with Closets, probably hoping to escape from the palace through the Carriage Gate. The gate was locked, so she crept into a small cabinet, hoping that Turhan's eunuchs would pass her by and that the Janissaries would come to her rescue. When Süleyman Ağa's men stormed into her chamber, they encountered an elderly woman who served as Kösem's buffoon. The woman, who was armed with a pistol, pointed at them when they questioned her about Kösem's whereabouts, to which she replied "I am the valide sultan", but Süleyman Ağa cried "It is not she", and pushed her aside.

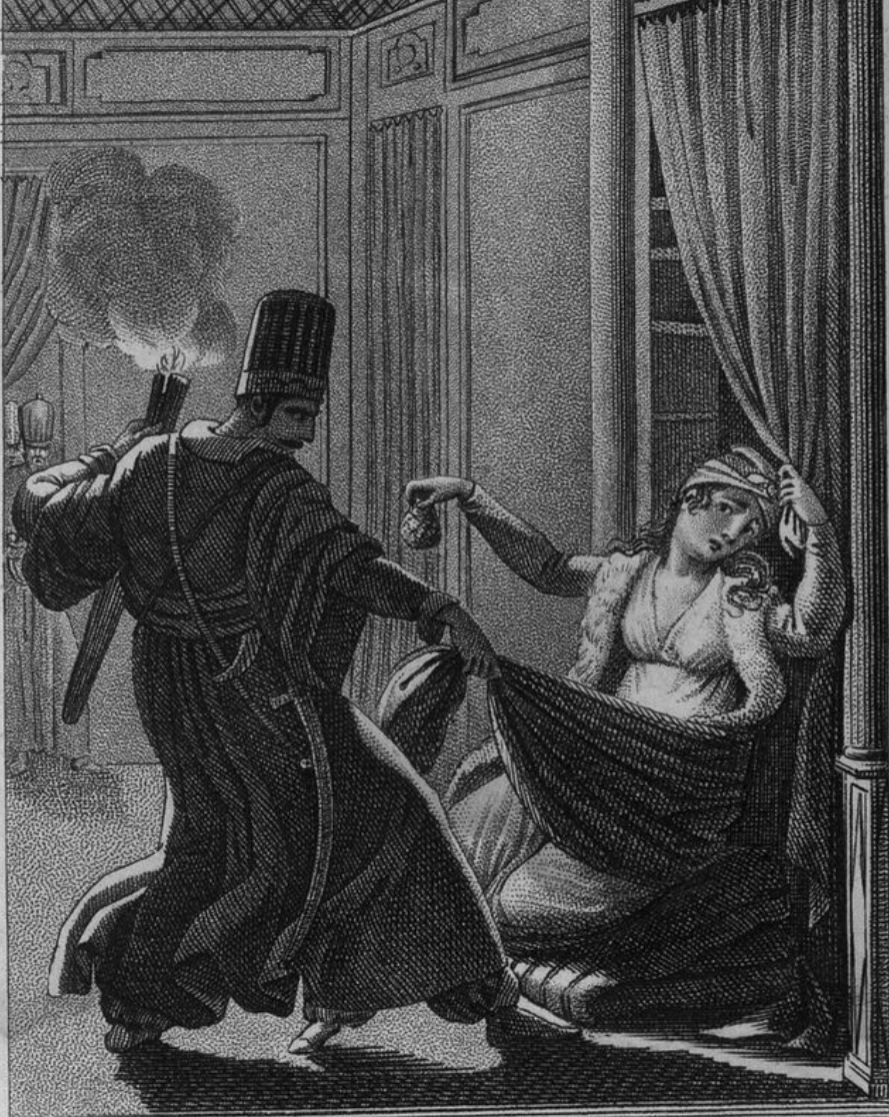
"La malheureuse Sultane offrit en vain a celui qui l'avait decouverte un mouchoir rempli de sequins," (engraving by Antoine-Laurent Castellan, 1812)

Eventually Kösem was betrayed to a halberdier by a piece of her dress that protruded from under the cabinet door. Dragged out by one of her assailants, she told him, "O brave man, be not cruel unto me", while trying to divert their attention by tossing gold coins onto the floor, but they were not deceived. She was then held by one of the men as they seized her garments, jewelry, bracelets, garters, and other valuables. Her earrings, two chestnut-sized diamonds with a ruby beneath each diamond that had been given to her by her husband Ahmed, were torn apart by an Albanian man called Bostanci Ali Ağa; their estimated worth was thought to equal Egypt's entire annual income. Rycaut also mentioned the theft of a beautiful locket engraved with the names of her late sons Murad and Ibrahim.

Kösem was then dragged by her feet to the gateway leading from the harem into the Third Court, where Süleyman Ağa ordered his men to kill her. A group of four men, all of them young and inexperienced, attempted to strangle her with a piece of cord ripped from the curtains since they were forbidden from using a bowstring. While the others drew the cord, one assassin climbed on her back and gripped her neck, but stopped when Kösem bit his thumb. In retaliation, he struck her forehead, causing her to fall unconscious. Then, assuming she was dead, they screamed out, 'She is dead, she is dead!' and went to notify the sultan and the grand vizier. Once they were out of sight, she miraculously lifted herself up again, hoping to escape through a secret passageway, but as soon as her disappearance was discovered, the assassins were called back again and she was caught.

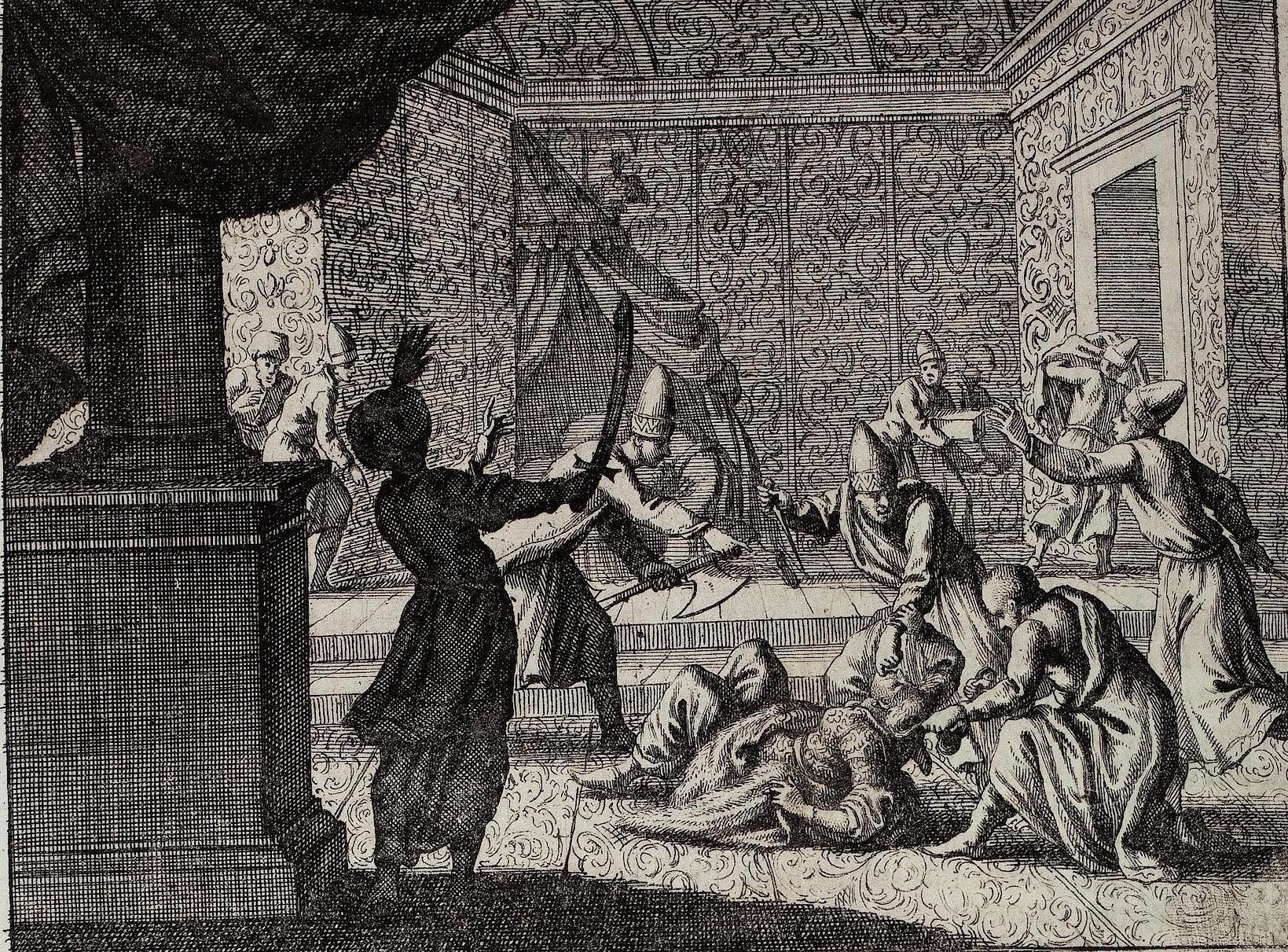
Murder of Kösem Sultan (engraving by Paul Rycaut, 1694)

According to Rycaut, the assassins then applied the cord for the second time, although the Ottoman renegade Bobovi, relying on an informant in the harem, claimed that she was strangled with her own hair. She is believed to have resisted with such force that blood from her ears and nose soaked the murderer's clothes. Once she had died, her body was dragged outside and shown to the remaining Janissaries, before being moved into a room in the corridor of the Kuşhâne Kapısı (Aviary Gate).

The next morning, Kösem's body was taken from Topkapı Palace to the Old Palace (Eski Sarayı) to be washed. Rycaut described the funeral of the woman he referred to as the 'Queen': "The Black Eunuchs immediately took up the Corpse, and in a reverent manner laid it stretched forth in the Royal Mosch; which about 400 of the Queens Slaves encompassing round about with howlings and lamentations, tearing the hair from their heads after their barbarous fashion, moved compassion in all the Court." She was buried without ceremony in the mausoleum of her late husband Ahmed I. Her slaves were also taken to the Old Palace and eventually married to suitable Muslims with dowry money taken from her estate. Her vast estates and tax farms in Anatolia and Rumelia and other places, her jewellery, precious stones and twenty boxes of gold coins that she had hidden in the Büyük Valide Han near the Grand Bazaar were all confiscated by the treasury.

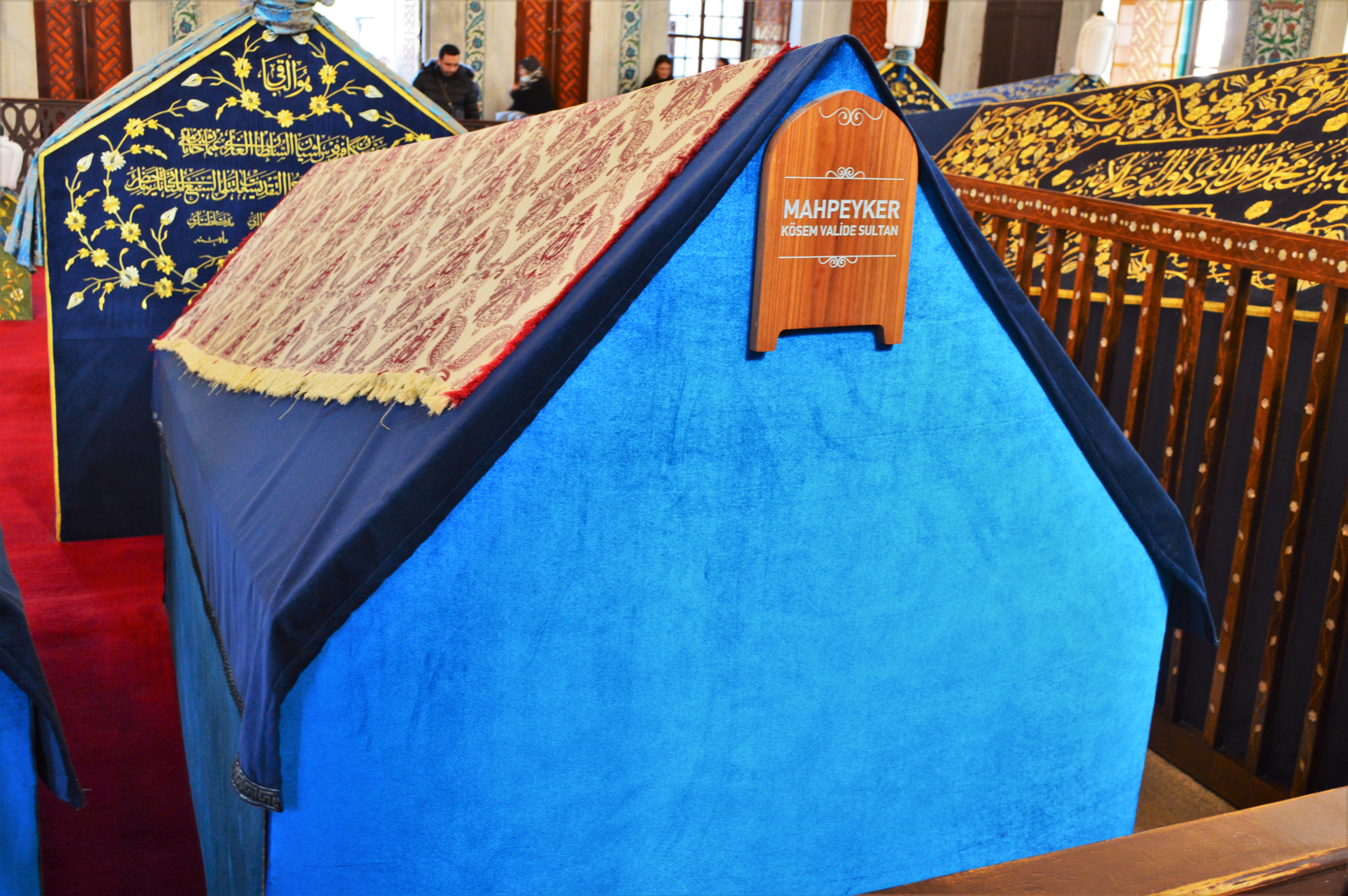
Tomb of Kösem Sultan

=== Aftermath ===
When news of Kösem's murder spread the following morning, a large crowd was said to have gathered in front of Topkapı Palace's gates. There, they are claimed to have accused the Janissaries of murdering Kösem and pledged to take revenge. The Grand Vizier Siyavuş Pasha responded by proposing that the Sacred Standard of Muhammed, which was typically brought out at the beginning of campaigns against Christian or Shia nations, be displayed above Topkapı Palace's main gate. To implement a levy of all able-bodied men for the public defence, the grand vizier ordered criers to pass through the streets of Constantinople shouting, "Whoever is a Muslim, let him rally around the banner of the religion. Those who do not come are rendered infidels and they are divorced from their [Muslim] wives." Three days of spontaneous mourning were observed by the people of Constantinople, during which the city's marketplaces and mosques were closed. Kösem's murder also allegedly began a custom of lighting candles "for her soul" at the Topkapı Palace every night, which lasted until the palace's closure in the nineteenth century.

That same day, the Agha of the Janissaries Şahin Ağa exhorted his troops to exact revenge on Kösem, declaring, "We want only the Valide's expiation!" A voice asked, "Are you then the Valide's heir, son, or husband?" The long silence that followed proved that the Janissaries disagreed with their commander's position. Later, once Şahin Ağa's troops deserted him out of fear, he and the other rebel commanders were hunted down and put to death.

Contemporary Ottoman chroniclers did not welcome Kösem's murder and recorded it as an injustice committed against a woman of great accomplishments and stature, and a harbinger of greater social disorder. Evliya Çelebi, a famous Ottoman traveler, writer and admirer of Kösem, described the murder: "The mother of the world, wife of Sultan Ahmed (I); mother of Murad (IV), and Ibrahim; the Grand Kösem Valide—was strangled by the Chief Black Eunuch Div Süleyman Agha. He did it by twisting her braids around her neck. So that gracious benefactress was martyred. When the Istanbul populace heard of this, they closed the mosques and the bazaars for three days and nights. There was a huge commotion. Several hundred people were put to death, secretly and publicly, and Istanbul was in a tumult." Dervish Abdullah Efendi, a late 17th century writer, recalled: "Those black infidel eunuchs martyred the Senior Mother [Kösem], Mother of the Believers"—a term usually reserved for Muhammad's wives—"and plundered most of her jewels." While lauding her charity, Naima also criticised Kösem for her greed and political interference. As regards the events leading up to her murder, he stated: "It was divine wisdom that the respected valide, philanthropic and regal as she was, was martyred for the sake of those unjust oppressions." Although Naima felt some regret over her death he also blamed it on the corrupt Janissary aghas and other officials who enjoyed her patronage. In other words, he implicitly supported Sultan Mehmed IV's decision to order her murder and the punishment of her political faction.

Kaya Sultan, Sultan Murad IV's daughter and Kösem's paternal granddaughter, condemned Grand Vizier Siyavuş Pasha's apparent role in her grandmother's assassination, as recorded by contemporary historian Evliya Çelebi: "You tyrant Siyavuş! You murdered my grandmother, your lord Murad's mother. Aren't you and my kinsmen? By the soul of my grandfather [Sultan Ahmed I] I will curse you, and you will get no pleasure from this seal."

The assassination of this powerful, widely respected, and widely feared woman provoked a political crisis. The first phase involved the execution of Kösem's Janissary supporters while in the second, public outrage over the purge prompted Turhan's new administration to dismiss the Grand Vizier Siyavuş Pasha and Şeyhülislam Abdülaziz Efendi who had carried out the executions.

== Charities and patronage ==
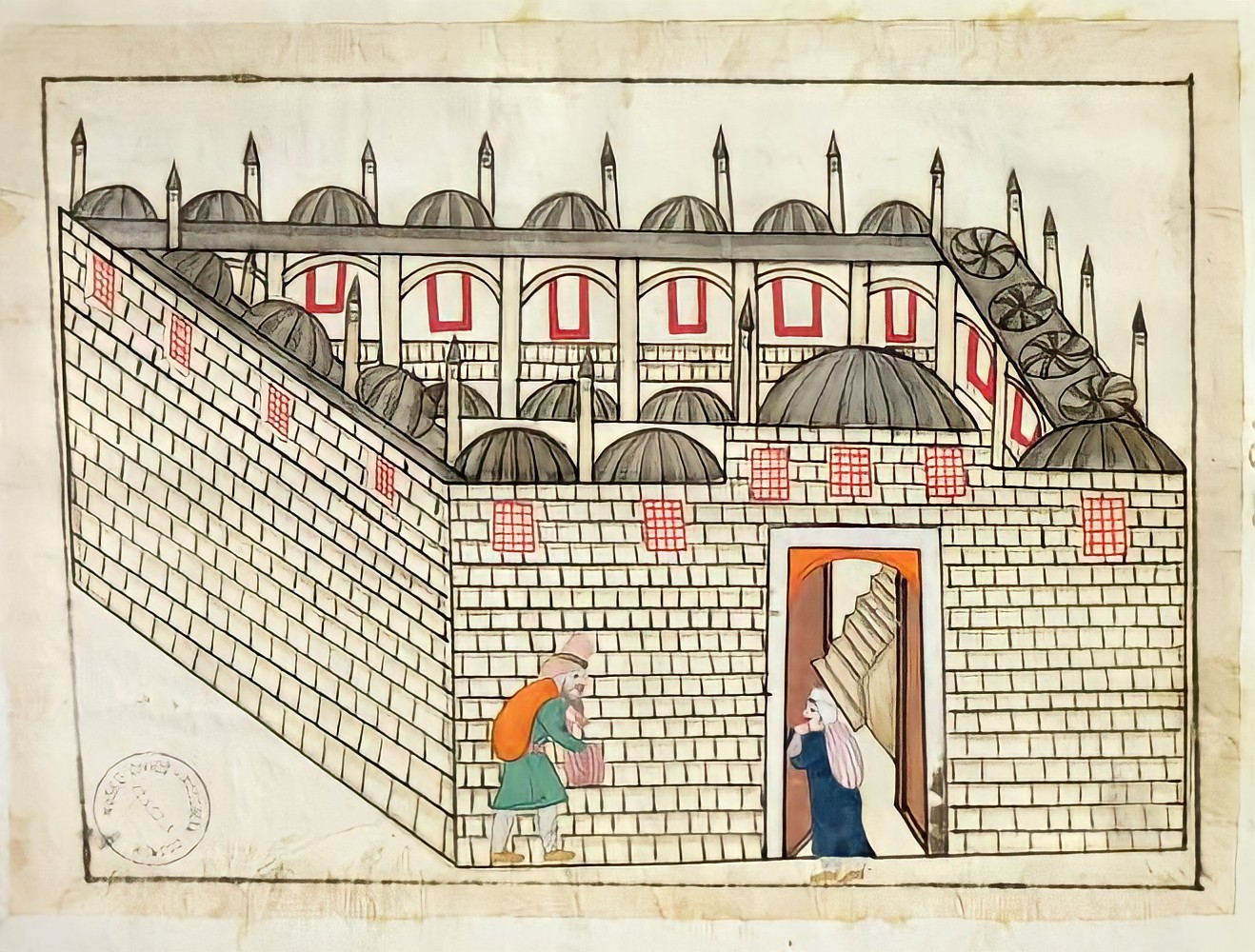
The Büyük Valide Han in an Ottoman miniature, 17th century, the largest commercial building in Constantinople when it was built by Kösem Sultan in 1651, accommodated thousands of traveling merchants for more than 350 years.

Kösem's philanthropic career is notable for the many charitable acts she undertook. According to the Turkish historian Muzaffer Ozgules, her chief concern was to avoid public censure. Every year in the Islamic month of Rajab she would leave the palace in disguise to arrange the release of imprisoned debtors and other offenders (excluding murderers) by paying their debts or compensation for their crimes. She was also known for seeking out poor orphan girls and endowing them with a mahr, a home and furnishings; women of all religious persuasions, across both Christian Europe and the Ottoman Empire, bequeathed money to provide dowries for poor women, including special funds for noble girls whose families had fallen on hard times. She also visited hospitals, mosques, and schools to boost her popularity, and established soup kitchens capable of feeding nearly all of Constantinople's starving people. In Egypt, she financed irrigation works from the Nile into Cairo.

According to Naima, "She would free her slave women after two or three years of service, and would arrange marriages with retired officers of the court or suitable persons from outside, giving the women dowries and jewels and several purses of money according to their talents and station, and ensuring that their husbands had suitable positions. She looked after these former slaves by giving them an annual stipend, and on the religious festivals and holy days she would give them purses of money." Her pages, who were entrusted with guarding her apartment, only worked for five days a week.

In 1640 she paid for the construction of the Çinili Mosque (Tiled Mosque), copiously decorated with the tiles that gave it its name, and the nearby school in Üsküdar. The construction of this modest complex was probably an attempt to boost the popularity of her sons at a time when the Ottoman dynasty faced extinction, with no heir apparent to inherit the throne. She also paid for fountains in Anadolukavağı, Yenikapı, Beşiktaş and Eyüp, as well as other fountains outside the capital, and converted the madrasa of Özdemiroğlu Osman Pasha into a mosque with a grand fountain beside it. Additionally in 1651 she funded the construction of the Büyük Valide Han in Constantinople, which was used to provide accommodation for foreign traders, store goods and merchandise, house artisan workshops, and provide business offices (an urban legend claims that she hid most of her precious jewels in the depths of one of its towers). Following the capture of Rethymno in Crete in 1646, one of its many converted churches was renamed the Valide Sultan Mosque in Ortakapı in her honour, making her the first Ottoman noblewoman whose name was given to one of a conquered city's converted religious structures.

As a devout Muslim, she also established a foundation to provide pilgrims on the Hajj with water, assist the poor and have the Quran read.

== Wealth ==
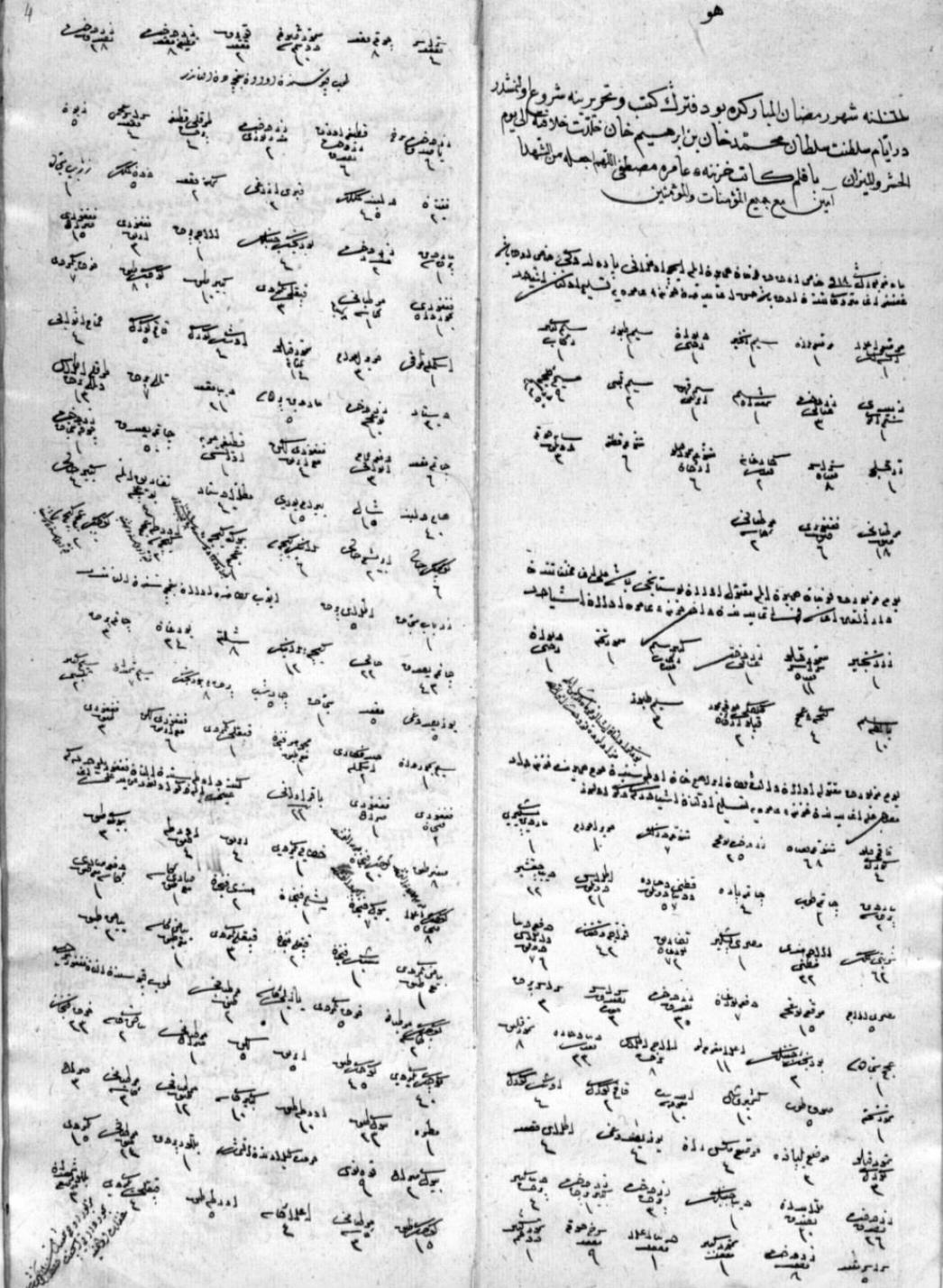
Kösem Sultan's muhallefât record. The Ottoman legal system required that the distribution of the deceased's belongings and goods be documented.

Kösem accumulated a massive fortune through Iltizām (tax farming), owning and leasing commercial buildings, and investing extensively in diverse economic activities. In his memoirs, qadi Karaçelebizade Abdülaziz Efendi, a prominent member of the ulama, described a meeting of the imperial council at which the subject of crown lands held by royal women was being discussed. When it was reported that Kösem held lands whose annual income was three hundred thousand kuruş, Karaçelebizade protested, "A valide with so much land is unheard of!" He also contended that those who opposed him only did so out of enmity toward him or because they were recipients of the valide sultan's largesse.

The historian Şarih ül-Menarzade argued that Kösem's extensive charities were also misconceived since they were financed from her immense personal fortune, viewing her wealth as an abuse of the empire's fiscal management, especially at a time when the treasury was in dire straits, the peasantry impoverished, and the military unpaid. A century later, however, the historian Naima defended Kösem from such criticisms, arguing that, had her substantial fortune remained in the treasury, it might have been squandered rather than spent for the benefit of the populace.

Critics of Kösem also recorded the depredations of her "violent tax collectors", who, in an effort to increase their own take, were responsible for her huge income. Naima relayed the criticism of Şarih ül-Menarzade: "The valide sultan's stewards... collected incalculable amounts of money. The peasants of the Ottoman domains suffered much violence and disaster on account of the excessive taxes, but because of their fear of the stewards, they were unable to inform the valide sultan or anyone else of their situation." Besides the annual taxes that she collected from Lesbos, Euboea, Zile, Menemen, Gaza, Kilis and other places, she operated farms in Cyprus, Rumelia and other locations in Anatolia. The port city of Volos was also her property.

When the Cretan War broke out in 1645, the Venetian bailo of Constantinople reported that the valide sultan was highly benevolent while also being extremely wealthy.

Upon her death in 1651, her chambers were looted, and it was reported that twenty boxes loaded with gold coins were discovered in the Büyük Valide Han. In 1664, the profit on Kösem's cash investments accounted for nearly two-thirds of the revenue of the endowment established for Safiye Sultan's Karamanlu mosque. In fact, her riches and business transactions were so broad that her agents also became very wealthy and enjoyed popular esteem. When recording the death of Kösem in his history, Naima commented of her steward: "The afore-mentioned Behram Kethiida enjoyed great prestige and distinction and wealth. As the manager of all the affairs of the valide sultan and the pious institutions she had established, and as an extremely trustworthy man, he acquired a great deal of wealth and property. But his children and his grandchildren did not maintain the high stature he had enjoyed, and his wealth and property were squandered." Her wealth was so vast and spread across so many different enterprises that, according to Naima, it took fifty years for the state treasury to confiscate it all.

== Legacy ==
Despite her notoriety as a woman who showed no mercy or compassion for the sake of government and power, Kösem was known among Ottoman citizens for her charitable work, which succeeded in securing the image that she desired. The chronogram that appears on the gate of the Çinili Mosque's courtyard reads:

"Mother of Sultan Ibrahim Khan, her Majesty of the Sultana, the most munificent mother of the sultan: She constructed this divine edifice as an act of charity. Lo, let it be a house of prayer for the servants of God! May they be summoned to God's mercy at the five times [of prayer]! May it be a halting place for worshippers and ascetics! She built a school, fountain, bath and fountain, for which let God grant her favor and benevolence! Philanthropists and those who worship in it, O God, take them into the eternal Paradises! The charitable work of the sultan's mother was completed in [the Islamic year] one thousand fifty [1640-41]."

Among her contemporaries, the writer Michel Baudier depicted her as a female politician "enjoying authority" while his French counterpart Jean-Baptiste Tavernier described her as "a woman very wise and well-versed in state affairs." In 1649, Johann Georg Metzger (1623–1698), secretary to Austrian ambassador Johann Rudolf Schmid zum Schwarzenhorn, expressed inferior masculinity through the alleged dominant behavior of Kösem. According to Metzger, Kösem is "a fraudulent person, who dominates the whole empire."

Both Alphonse de Lamartine and Joseph von Hammer-Purgstall praised her charitable works, with Hammer describing her as: "A magnanimous, high minded queenly woman, of high spirit and noble heart, but with a mania for power. She, the mother of the greatest tyrant Murad IV, and the greatest wastrel, Ibrahim I, the Greek Kosem who was named Moonfigure because of beauty, through the commanding glance of four emperors—her husband, two sons, and her grandson—was revered more in history than Agrippina, Nero's mother, through her kindness, her desire for power and the tragic finish in Osman history of a female Caesar."

In the introduction to the English translation of the novel Histoire d'Osman premier du nom, XIXe empereur des Turcs, et de l'impératrice Aphendina Ashada by Madame de Gomez in 1736, describing the life of Osman II, Kösem is said to have been "one of the most active in politics and enterprising women of her time, which she achieved by insidious intrigues from ambitious motives."

== Issue ==
Name	Birth	Death	Details
Şehzade Mehmed	11 March 1605	12 January 1621	Executed at order of his elder half-brother, Osman II. Buried in the Ahmed I Mausoleum, Blue Mosque.
Gevherhan Sultan (possibly)	1605, 1606 or 1608	18 April 1631	Married to Öküz Mehmed Pasha and Topal Recep Pasha in 1612 and 1622, respectively. Buried in the Ahmed I Mausoleum, Blue Mosque.
Ayşe Sultan	1606 or 1608	c. 1656	Married to Gümülcineli Nasuh Pasha, Karakaş Mehmed Pasha, Hafız Ahmed Pasha, Damat Murtaza Pasha, Ahmed Pasha, Voynuk Ahmed Pasha, Ibşir Mustafa Pasha and Ermeni Süleyman Pasha in 1612, 1620, 1626, 1635, 1639, 1645, 1655 and 1656, respectively. Buried in the Ahmed I Mausoleum, Blue Mosque.
Fatma Sultan	1606 or 1608	1670	Married to Kara Mustafa Pasha, Çatalcalı Hasan Pasha, Canbuladzade Mustafa Pasha, Koca Yusuf Pasha, Melek Ahmed Pasha, Kanbur Mustafa Pasha and Közbekçi Yusuf Pasha in 1623, 1629, 1632, 1637, 1662, 1663 and 1667, respectively. Buried in the Ahmed I Mausoleum, Blue Mosque.
Hanzade Sultan	1607	21 September 1650	Married to Ladikli Bayram Pasha and Nakkaş Mustafa Pasha in 1623 and 1639, respectively. Buried in the Ibrahim I Mausoleum, Hagia Sophia.
Şehzade Orhan (possibly)	1609	1612	He and his brother Selim are mentioned in a Venetian letter as Kosem's sons. However, it was proposed by Erhan Afyoncu that those were second names of Kasim and Ibrahim. Buried in the Ahmed I Mausoleum, Blue Mosque.
Şehzade Selim (possibly)	27 June 1611	27 July 1611	He and his brother Selim are mentioned in a Venetian letter as Kosem's sons. However, it was proposed by Erhan Afyoncu that those were second names of Kasim and Ibrahim. Buried in the Ahmed I Mausoleum, Blue Mosque.
Murad IV	27 July 1612	8 February 1640	17th Sultan of the Ottoman Empire. Buried in the Ahmed I Mausoleum, Blue Mosque.
Şehzade Süleyman (possibly)	1611, 1612 or 1615	27 July 1635	Executed at the order of his brother, Murad IV. Buried in the Ahmed I Mausoleum, Blue Mosque.
Şehzade Kasım	1614	17 February 1638	Executed at the order of his brother, Murad IV. Buried in the Murad III Mausoleum, Hagia Sophia.
Atike Sultan (possibly)	1614	1674	Married to Musahıp Cafer Pasha, Koca Kenan Pasha and Doğancı Yusuf Pasha in 1633, 1648 and 1652, respectively. Buried in the Ibrahim I Mausoleum, Hagia Sophia.
Ibrahim	13 October 1617	18 August 1648	18th Sultan of the Ottoman Empire. Buried in the Mustafa I Mausoleum, Hagia Sophia.

== In popular culture ==
- Genç Osman ve Sultan Murat Han (1962) movie, starring Muhterem Nur as Kösem Sultan
- IV. Murat (1980) TV series, starring Ayten Gökçer as Kösem Sultan
- Istanbul Kanatlarımın Altında (Istanbul Under my Wings, 1996) movie, starring Zuhal Olcay as Kösem Sultan
- Ankara Theatre (2013–2014 season) Özlem Ersönmez as Kösem Sultan.
- Mahpeyker: Kösem Sultan (2010), starring Damla Sönmez (as young Kösem) and Selda Alkor (as old Kösem)
- Tims Production produced a follow-up to the smash-hit historical-fiction television Muhteşem Yüzyıl (Magnificent Century), entitled Muhteşem Yüzyıl: Kösem, starring Anastasia Tsilimpiou as the teen Kösem and Beren Saat as young Kösem in season one. In season two, old Kösem was portrayed by Nurgül Yeşilçay.
- Three Thousand Years of Longing (2022), featuring Zerrin Tekindor as Kösem Sultan

== Gallery ==
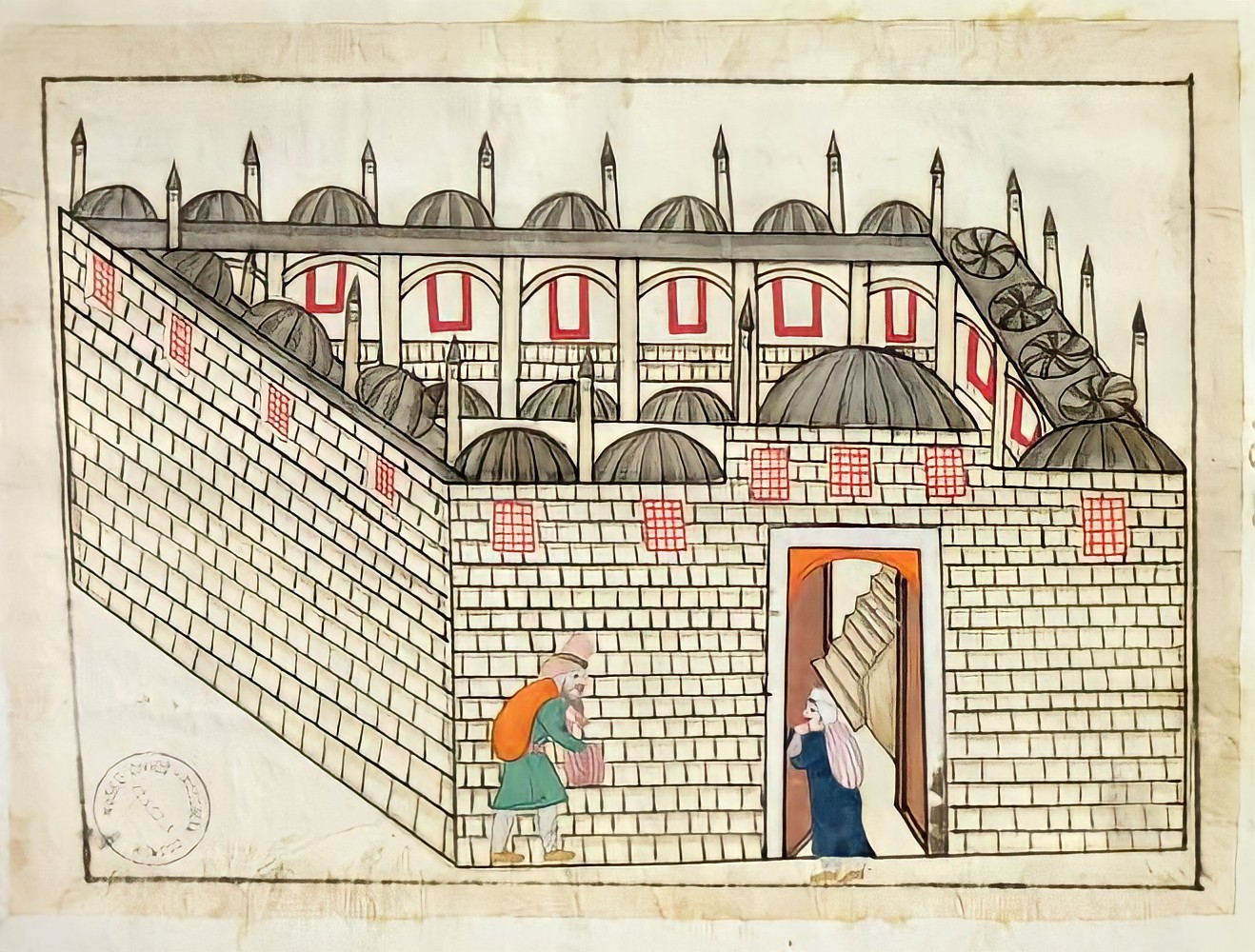
The Büyük Valide Han in an Ottoman miniature, c. 17th century

== See also ==
- Ottoman dynasty
- Ottoman family tree
- List of mothers of the Ottoman sultans
- List of consorts of the Ottoman sultans
- Büyük Valide Han
- Ahmed I
- Sultanate of Women
- Al-Siyasa al-Shar'iyya fi Islah al-Ra'i wa al-Ra'iyya

== Bibliography ==
- Bosworth, C.E (1986). Encyclopaedia of Islam. Vol. V (Khe-Mahi). Brill Archive. p. 1333. ISBN 9004078193.
- Argit, Betül Ipsirli (29 October 2020). Life after the Harem: Female Palace Slaves, Patronage and the Imperial Ottoman Court. Cambridge University Press. ISBN 978-1-108-48836-5.
- Baer, Marc David (2021). The Ottomans: Khans, Caesars and Caliphs. John Murray Press. ISBN 978-1-4736-9572-6.
- Baer, Marc David (2008). Honored by the Glory of Islam. Oxford University Press. ISBN 978-0-19-804417-8.
- "Kosem Sultan (Ottoman sultana)". Britannica Online Encyclopedia.
- Davis, Fanny (1970). The Palace of Topkapi in Istanbul. Scribner. OCLC 636864790.
- Freely, John (1998). Istanbul: The Imperial City. Penguin Publishing Group. ISBN 978-0-14-024461-8.
- Huemer, Anna (2022). "Effeminate Rulers, Brave Soldiers? "Foreign" Masculinities in Selected Travelogues of Habsburg Diplomats in the Ottoman Empire". In Gruber, Doris; Strohmeyer, Arno (eds.). On the Way to the '(Un)Known'?: The Ottoman Empire in Travelogues (c. 1450-1900). Walter de Gruyter GmbH & Co KG. ISBN 978-3-11-069804-6.
- Imber, Colin (2009). The Ottoman Empire. New York: Palgrave MacMillan.
- Isom-Verhaaren, Christine; Schull, Kent F. (11 April 2016). Living in the Ottoman Realm: Empire and Identity, 13th to 20th Centuries. Indiana University Press. ISBN 978-0-253-01948-6.
- İlgürel, M. (2002). "Kösem Sultan" (PDF). Islamansiklopedisi (in Turkish) (26): 273–275. Archived from the original (PDF) on 24 June 2015.
- Jenkins, Everett (7 May 2015). The Muslim Diaspora (Volume 2, 1500-1799): A Comprehensive Chronology of the Spread of Islam in Asia, Africa, Europe and the Americas. McFarland. ISBN 978-1-4766-0889-1.
- Junne, George H. (2016). The Black Eunuchs of the Ottoman Empire: Networks of Power in the Court of the Sultan. Bloomsbury Publishing. ISBN 978-0-8577-2808-1.
- Kohen, Elli (2006). History of the Turkish Jews and Sephardim: Memories of a Past Golden Age. Maryland: University Press of America.
- Mansel, Philip (1995). Constantinople: City of the World's Desire, 1453–1924. New York: St. Martin's Press. ISBN 0719550769.
- Peirce, Leslie P. (1993). The Imperial Harem: Women and Sovereignty in the Ottoman Empire. Oxford University Press. ISBN 0195086775.
- Piterberg, Gabriel (2003). An Ottoman Tragedy: History and Historiography at Play. California: University of California Press. ISBN 0-520-23836-2.
- Rycaut, Sir Paul; Sagredo, Giovanni (1694). Die Neu-eröffnete Ottomannische Pforte, Bestehend (in German). Auf Unkosten Lorentz Kronigers und Gottlieb Göbels seel. Erben, Buchhändl.
- Shaw, Stanford J.; Shaw, Ezel Kural (29 October 1976). History of the Ottoman Empire and Modern Turkey: Volume 1, Empire of the Gazis: The Rise and Decline of the Ottoman Empire 1280-1808. Cambridge University Press. ISBN 978-0-521-29163-7.
- Somel, S. A. (2003). Historical Dictionary of the Ottoman Empire. The Scarecrow Press, imprint of Rowman & Littlefield. p. 512. ISBN 0810866064.
- Tezcan, Baki (November 2001). Searching for Osman: A reassessment of the deposition of the Ottoman Sultan Osman II (1618-1622) (PhD Thesis). Princeton University.
- Tezcan, Baki (2008). "The Debut of Kösem Sultan's Political Career". Turcica (Turcica). 40: 347–359. doi:10.2143/TURC.40.0.2037143.
- Thys-Senocak, Lucienne (2006). Ottoman Women Builders. Aldershot: Ashgate.
- Viaggi di Pietro della Valle, il pellegrino : descritti da lui medesimo in lettere familiari all'erudito suo amico Mario Schipano, divisi in tre parti cioè : La Truchia, La Persia, e l'India, colla vita dell'autore (PDF). Vol. 1. Brighton: G. Gancia. 1843.
- Zeidan, Adam. "Kosem Sultan (Ottoman sultana)". Britannica Online Encyclopedia.

Ottoman royalty
Preceded by Safiye Sultan	Haseki Sultan; 1605 – 22 November 1617	Succeeded by Ayşe Sultan
Preceded by Halime Sultan	Valide Sultan; 10 September 1623 – 2 September 1651 concurrently with Turhan Sultan: 1648 - 1651	Succeeded by Turhan Sultan as sole valide sultan
