= Cinci Hoca =

17th-century Ottoman spiritualist

Cinci Hoca (literally "hoca of jinn") is the epithet of Karabaşzade Hüseyin Efendi, a 17th-century Ottoman spiritualist whose influence on the sultan caused many problems in the empire.

== Life ==
He was born in Safranbolu (in modern province of Karabük, Turkey). According to Joseph von Hammer, he was a descendant of Sadrettin Konevi, a 13th-century Sufi. But unlike his famous ancestor, he made a name as a witch doctor and valide sultan (mother sultana) Kösem invited him to the palace to cure the unbalanced sultan Ibrahim. In 1643, Sultan Ibrahim appointed Cinci as the kadi of Galata and in 1644 as the kazasker of Anatolia (Turkish: Anadolu kazaskeri) an appointment which caused a great reaction among the ulama.

== Influence ==
Cinci used his increasing power to increase his wealth by accepting bribes. He was instrumental in executing the able grand vizier Kemankeş Mustafa Pasha in 1644. Seeing the end of his predecessor, the new grand vizier Semiz Mehmed Pasha became a very ineffective statesman.

== Death ==
When Ibrahim was dethroned in 1648 and replaced by Mehmed IV, the new grand vizier Sofu Mehmed Pasha faced the problem of bonus salaries (Turkish: culus bahşişi), the traditional salary paid to soldiers upon the enthronement of the new sultan. He confiscated Cinci's earnings and expelled Cinci to Damascus (now in Syria). But during his travel, Cinci fell ill in Mihalcık (now Karacabey in Bursa Province, Turkey). While staying in Mihalcık, he criticised the grand vizier and consequently he was executed.
