= Mustafa Naima =

Ottoman historian and poet

- Born: 1655; Aleppo, Ottoman Syria
- Died: 1716 (aged 60–61); Patras, Morea
- Occupations: Historian, Bureaucrat
- Writing career
- Genre: Ottoman history
- Notable work: Tarih-i Na'ima

Mustafa Naima (Ottoman Turkish: مصطفى نعيما; Muṣṭafā Na'īmā; 1655 – 1716) was an Ottoman bureaucrat and historian who wrote the chronicle known as the Tārīḫ-i Na'īmā (Naima's History). He is often considered to be the first official historian of the Ottoman Empire, although this formal office was probably not created until the time of his successor, Rashid.

== Life and career ==
Mustafā Na'īm was born the son of a Janissary in Aleppo, Ottoman Syria. He joined the palace guard in Constantinople and was educated as a secretary there. He rose in the financial administration of the empire until the palace intrigues caused him to be sent to a provincial administrative post in 1715.

As a historian Naima mentions the arrival of Mughal ambassadors: Qaim Beg, Sayyid Ataullah and Hajji Ahmad Saeed, sent by the Mughal Emperor Shah Jahan. The ambassadors lodged in the Seraglio of Saiwush Pasha.

He died in Patras.

== Works ==
Na'īmā's main work is the Ravżatu'l-Ḥüseyn fī ḫulāṣati aḫbāri'l-ḫāfiḳeyn (روضة الحسين فى خلاصة أخبار الخافقين in Ottoman; literally: "The Garden of Hüseyin in the Summary of the Chronicles of East and West"). This work was finished in 1704 and dedicated to the vizier Amcazade Hüseyin Paşa. The book covers the events of the years from 1591 to 1660.

== Bibliography ==
- Norman Itzkowitz: Ottoman Empire and Islamic Tradition, University of Chicago Press 1980, ISBN 0-226-38806-9.
- Lewis V. Thomas, Norman Itzkowitz (ed.): A Study Of Naima, New York University Press 1972, ISBN 0-8147-8150-0 / Hodder & Stoughton Ltd 1972, ISBN 0-340-16893-5.
- Annals of the Turkish Empire: from 1591 to 1659. Trans. Charles Fraser. London: Oriental Translation Fund, 1832.
- Gül Şen: Das Ereignis von Edirne (1703). Astrologie als Strategie zur Herrschaftslegitimation und Kontingenzbewältigung. In: Das Mittelalter, vol. 20, no. 1 (2015), pp. 115–138 (online) (German).
- Gül Şen: Kompilation als Handwerk des Historiographen – Zur Narrativität in Naʿīmās (gest. 1716) Hofchronik Tārīḫ-i Naʿīmā. In: Stephan Conermann (ed.): Innovation oder Plagiat? Kompilationstechniken in der Vormoderne. EB Verlag: Berlin 2015, ISBN 978-3-86893-004-7, pp. 169–218 (online) (German).

== See also ==
- List of Muslim historians
