= Windsor Shahnameh =

1648 Iranian illustrated manuscript

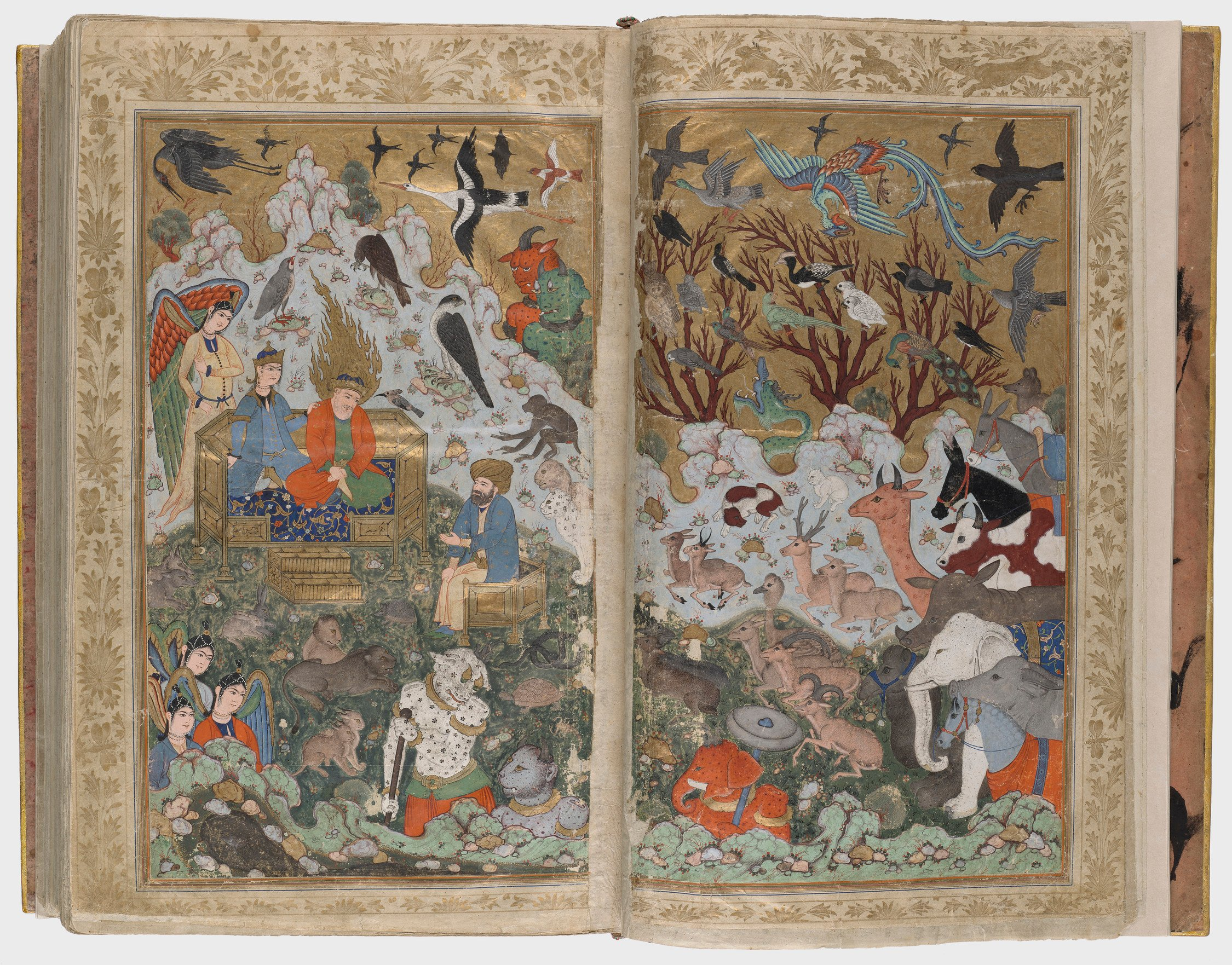
Soloman and the Bilqis enthroned together attended by angels, demons, animals, birds, and Asaf the vizier, Frontispiece of a Windsor Shahnameh painted by Malik Husayn Isfahani

The Windsor Shahnameh or Shahnameh of Qarajaghay Khan (Persian: شاهنامه قرچغای‌خان) is an illustrated manuscript of the Shahnameh, the national epic of Greater Iran. It is one of the most famous manuscripts of the Shahnameh, dating from 1648. The painters are Muhammad Qasim and Muhammad Yusuf. The miniatures of this Shahnameh are very similar to the miniatures of the Shahnameh of Rashida, and therefore it has been suggested that these manuscripts have been prepared by the same painters.

The Windsor Shahnameh contains 148 or 149 miniatures and is written in Nastaʿlīq script by Mohammad Hakim Hosseini to the order of Qarachaqay Khan (one of the commanders-in-chief of Abbas I of Persia). It is in very good condition compared to other manuscripts of the Shahnameh. It is not clear how and when this version of the Shahnameh was acquired by Ahmad Shah Durrani and subsequently his heir, Kamran Shah. In 1839, the Windsor Shahnameh was presented to Queen Victoria by Kamran Shah, for her support of the Afghans against the Qajar dynasty. The manuscript is now in the Royal Collection and usually in the library at Windsor Castle.
