= Muhammad Qasim (miniaturist) =

Persian miniaturist (c. 1575–1659)

Muhammad Qasim Tabrizi
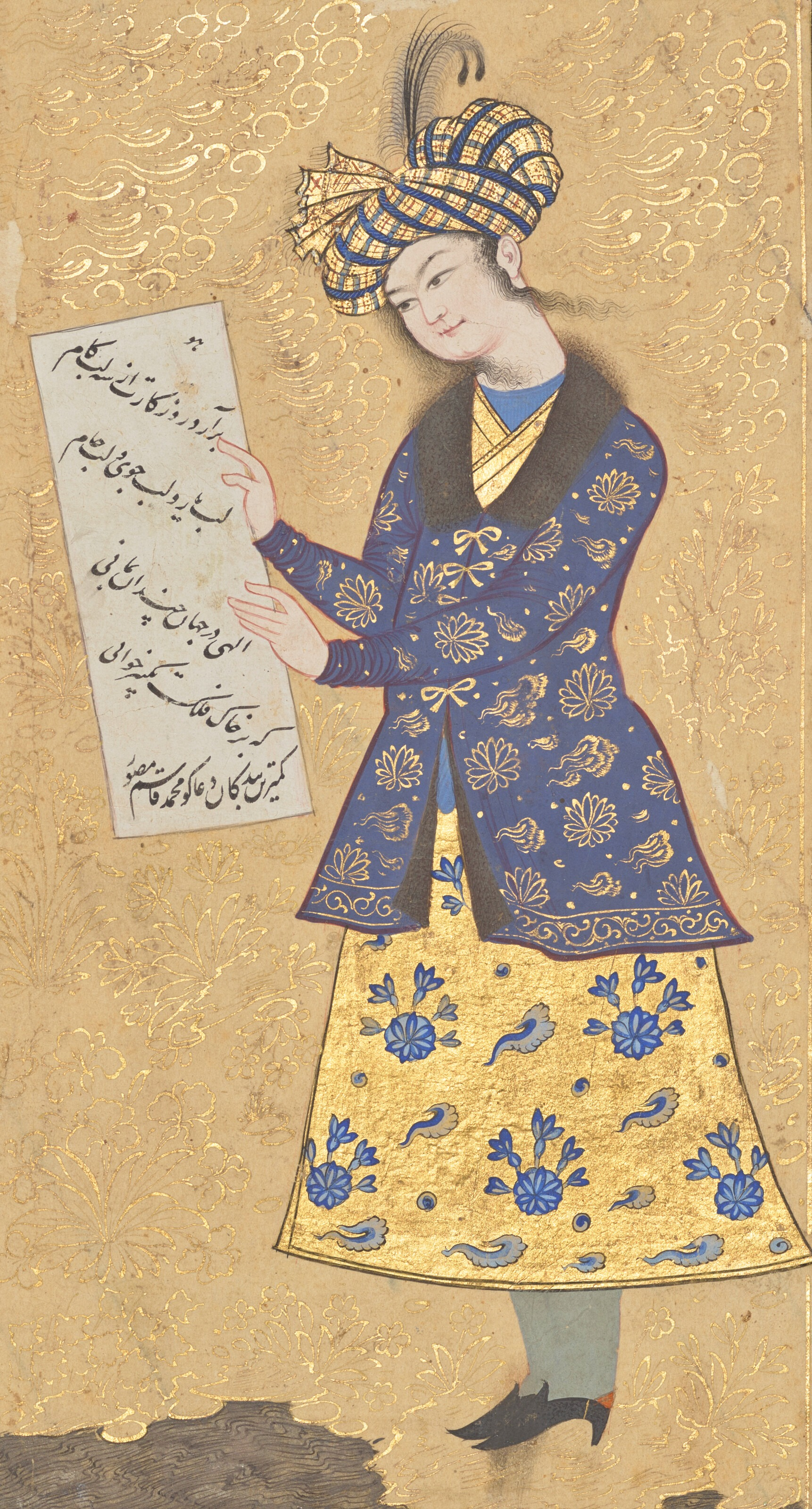
- "A standing youth holding a poem" Self-portrait. c. 1610–1630
- Born: c. 1575; Tabriz, Safavid Iran
- Died: 1659; Isfahan, Safavid Iran
- Known for: Persian miniature paintings
- Notable work: "Shah Abbas Embracing a Page"; Windsor Shahnameh illustrations

Muhammad Qasim Tabrizi (Persian: محمد قاسم تبریزی; c. 1575 – 1659) was a painter of Persian miniatures, including in the Windsor Shahnameh. His works are held in museums and galleries around the world.

== Context ==
Muhammad Qasim of Tabriz was a contemporary of Reza Abbasi (c. 1565 – 1635), and it was long mistakenly believed that he was one of Abbasi's pupils as he used the same style. The truth has been restored thanks to the Russian expert, Adel' Tigranovna Adamova. What little is known about this painter comes from the accounts of Wali Quli Shamlu in his work Kissas al-Kahani. He writes that Qasim was a poet and painter buried in Isfahan in 1659. On the evidence of his paintings, he began working in the 1590s.

== Career ==
=== Early period (1590–1605) ===
His early period (1590–1605) includes works bearing the influence of his masters, such as "Young Man in Green Clothing" (Kuwait, Al Sabakha Collection), "Young Man with a White Garment in His Hands," which shows the influence of Sadiq Bek (Arthur M. Sackler Gallery, Washington, D.C.), "Young Man in a Fur-Trimmed Coat" (Victoria and Albert Museum), "Young Woman Smoking a Hookah" (Topkapi Museum), and "Young Woman in European Dress" (Victoria and Albert Museum).

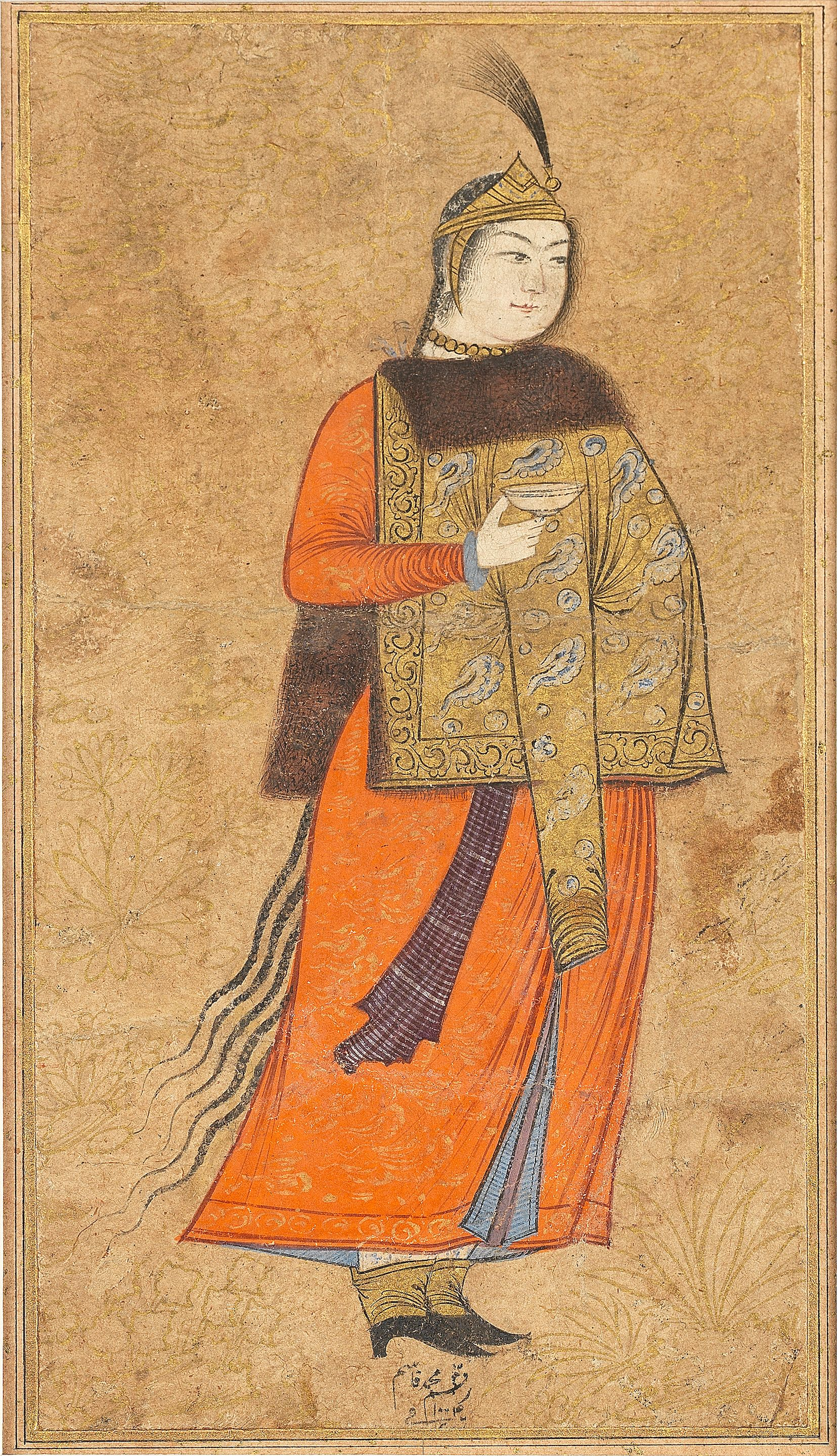
"A maiden wearing a luxurious fur mantle", attrib. to Qasim, 1596–97

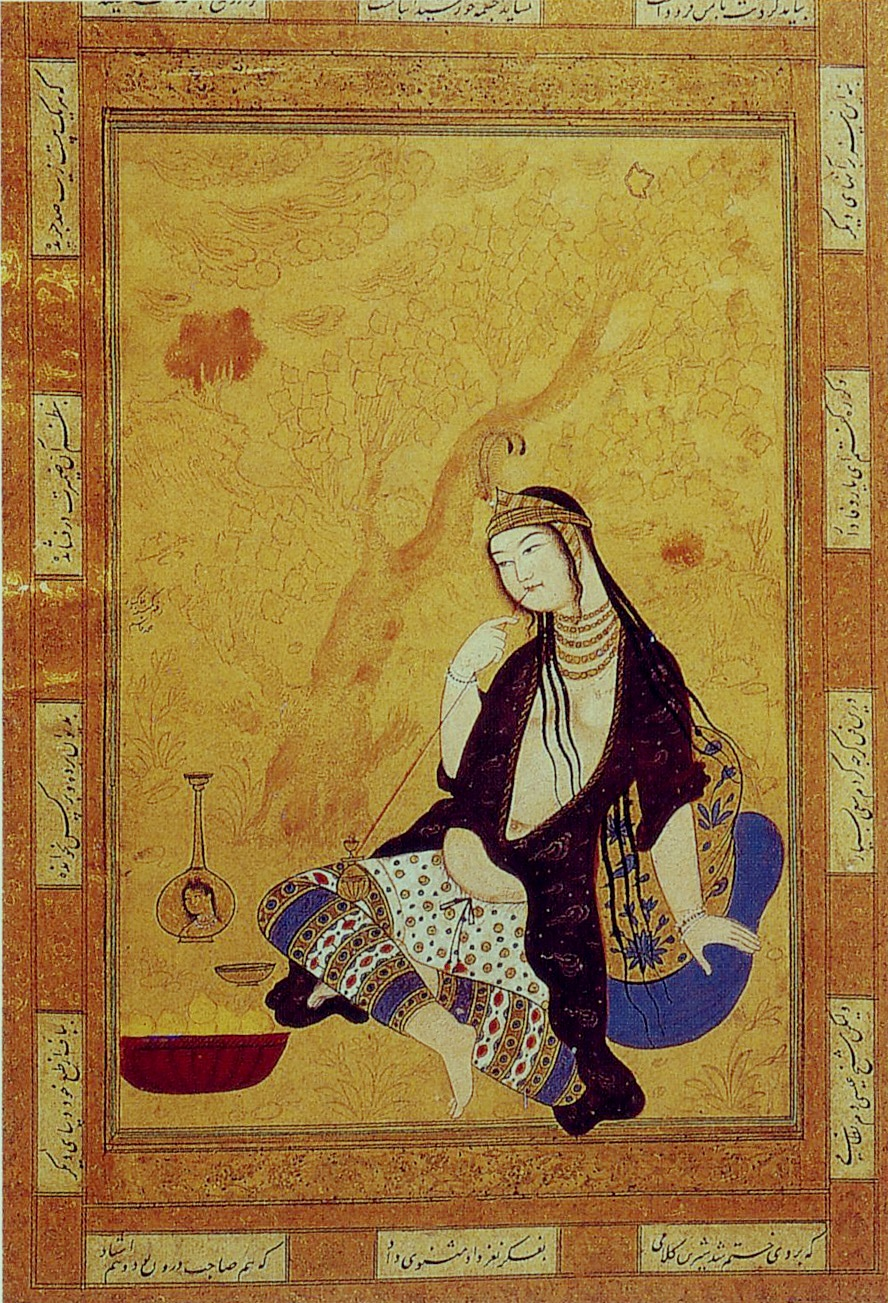
"Young woman smoking a hookah", c. 1600. Topkapi Museum

=== Middle period (1605–1627) ===
The middle period (1605–1627) includes works titled "The Chastisement of a Pupil" (1605–06) in the Metropolitan Museum of Art, "Page Carrying a Tray with Cups" (Bibliothèque nationale de France), "Page Carrying a Folio with a Poem" (Geneva, Collection of Prince Sadruddin Aga Khan), and "A prince being entertained in the countryside" (also called "Nighttime Picnic") (1620–1625, British Museum): this is a drawing enhanced with colour and gilding.

In 1627, Qasim depicted the Safavid Shah Abbas the Great with his page (a miniature now in the Louvre Museum). He was at this time the Shah's court painter. It has been described as "an intimate and suggestive portrait", implying that Abbas "observed religious rules only when it suited him".

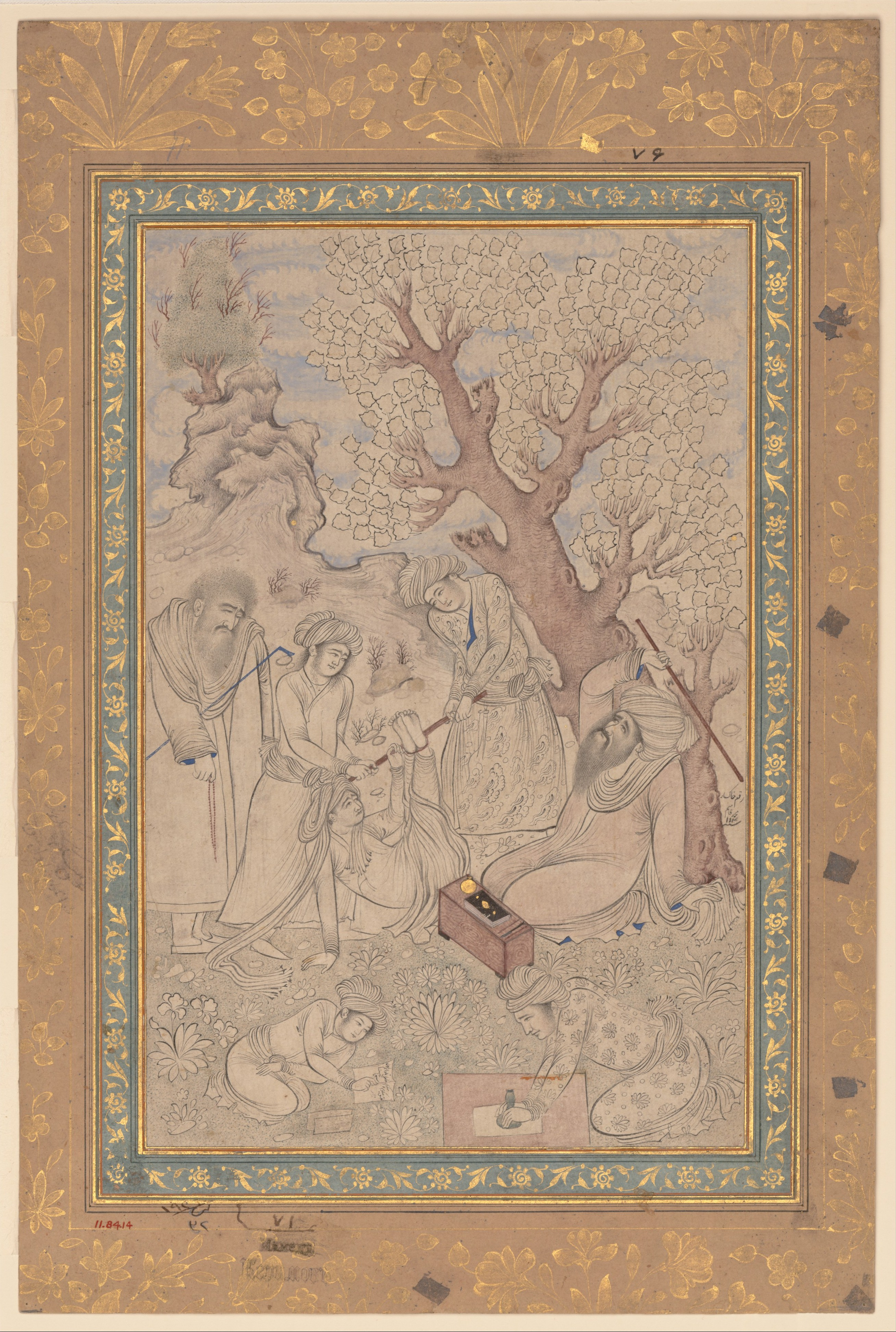
"Chastisement of a Pupil". 1605–06. Metropolitan Museum of Art

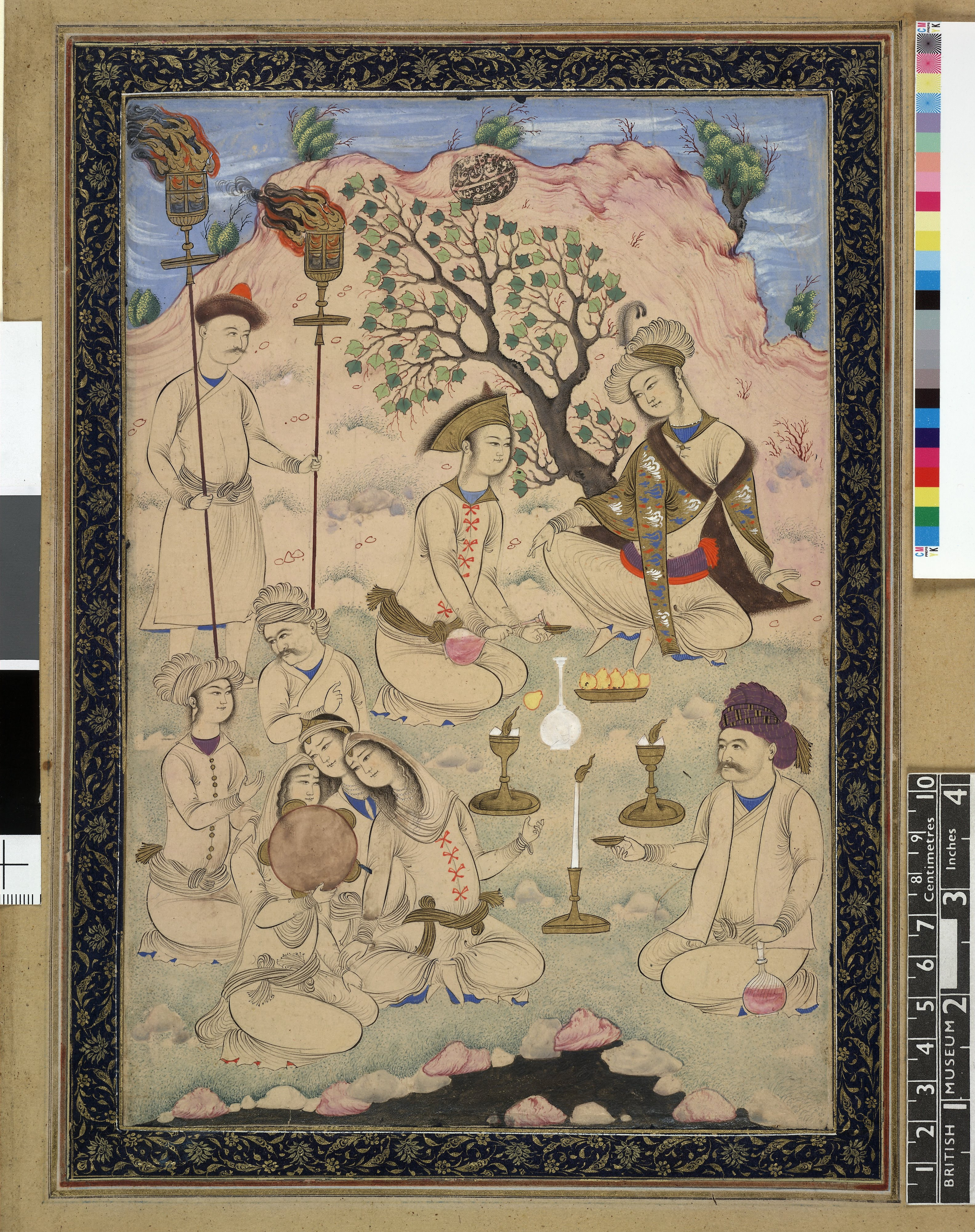
"A prince being entertained in the countryside" (also called "Nighttime Picnic"), with quinces, 1620–1625, British Museum

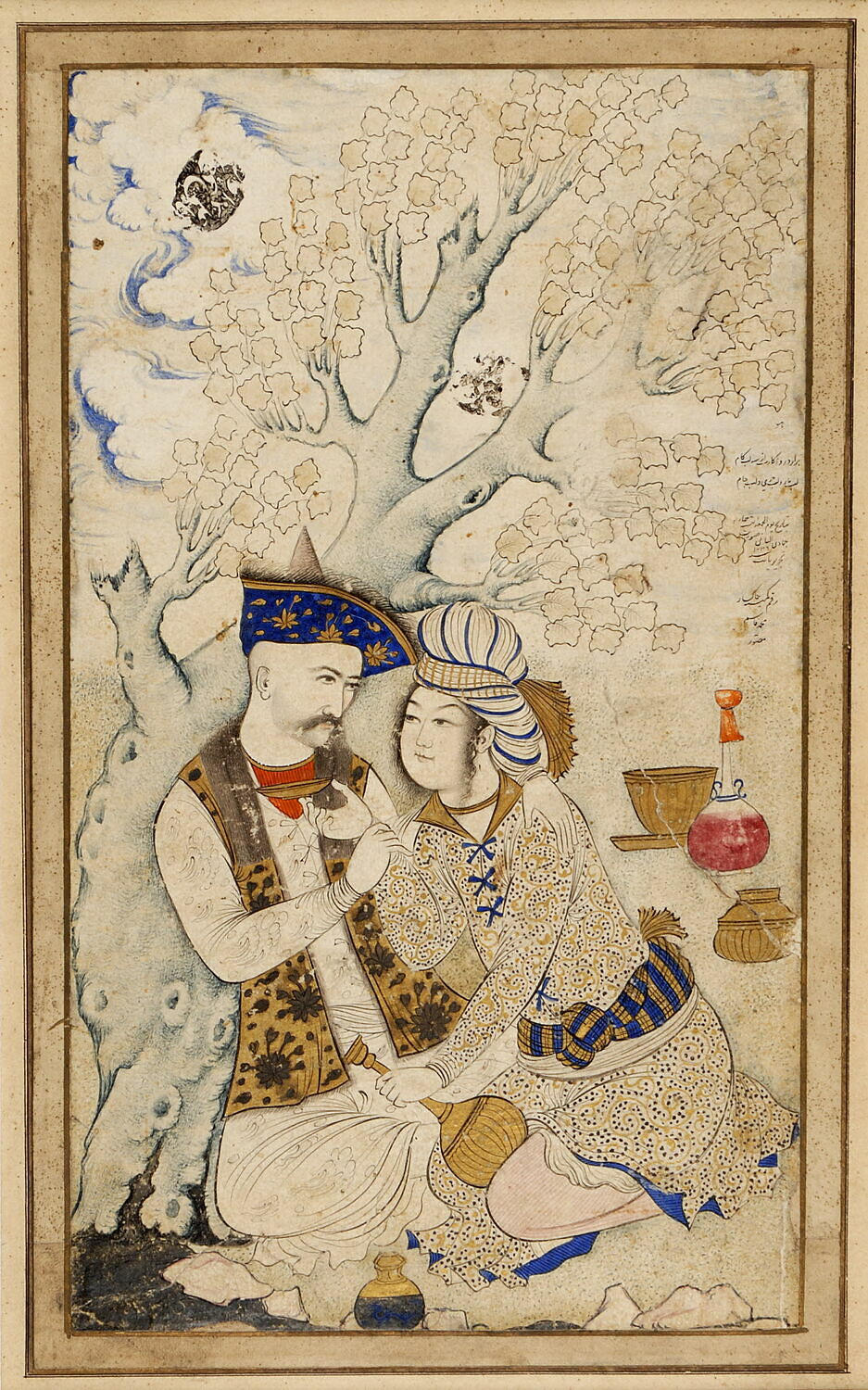
"Shah Abbas Embracing a Page". 1627. Louvre

=== Late period (1627–1659) ===
Compositions such as "The Young Man with the Iris" and "The Young Man with the Letter," in the Golestan Palace Library in Tehran, are attributed to Qasim's late period (1627 onwards). The text accompanying the latter drawing contains an offer of service from the painter to a high-ranking figure. Indeed, Abbas the Great died in 1629, so Qasim lost his principal patron. Art historians agree that Qasim sought a protector at this time.

His drawing "Man holding an album" (British Museum) was made c. 1650. The British Museum curator comments that it follows the artistic convention of a lone male poet or mystic in a wild landscape; the man's "facial expression and upward gaze suggest some degree of spirituality."

Qasim painted some of the miniatures in the 1635 Vahshi Bafqi manuscript Farhad and Shirin, He made many of the 148 miniatures (Mohammad Yusef creating the others) in a copy of Ferdowsi's 1648 Shahnameh epic poem manuscript, held in the Royal Collection. Qasim made ten full colour illustrations for a manuscript of Muhammad Riza's Suz u Gudaz ("Burning and Melting"), held in the Chester Beatty Library.

Qasim contributed to the wall paintings of the Palace of Forty Columns (Chehel Sotoun) in Isfahan, built for Abbas II.

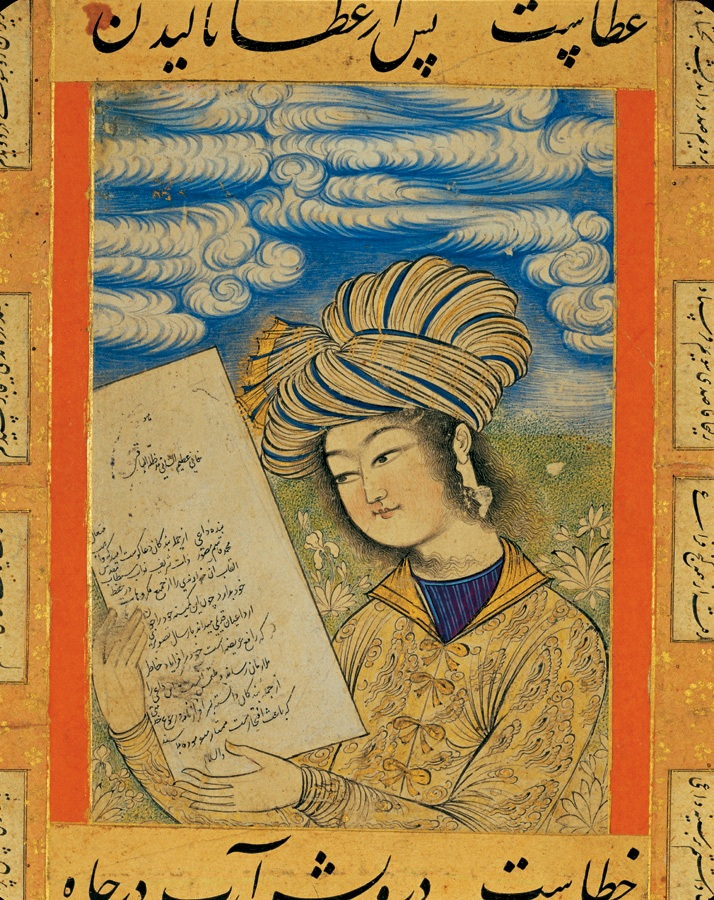
"Young Man with a Letter," 1629, Golestan Palace, Tehran

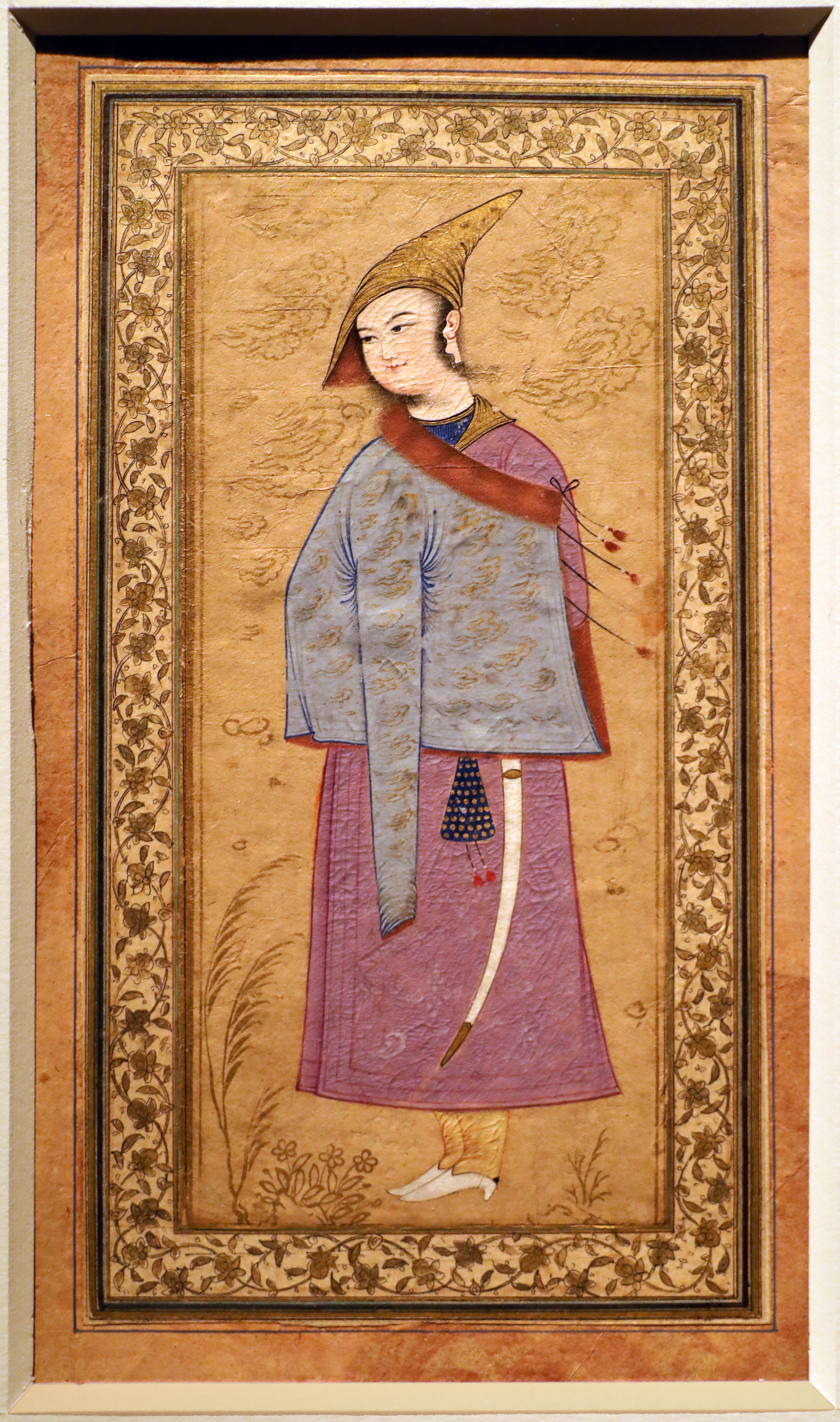
young man with pointed hat and fur-trimmed jacket, Isfahan, c. 1630–40. Museum of Islamic Art, Doha

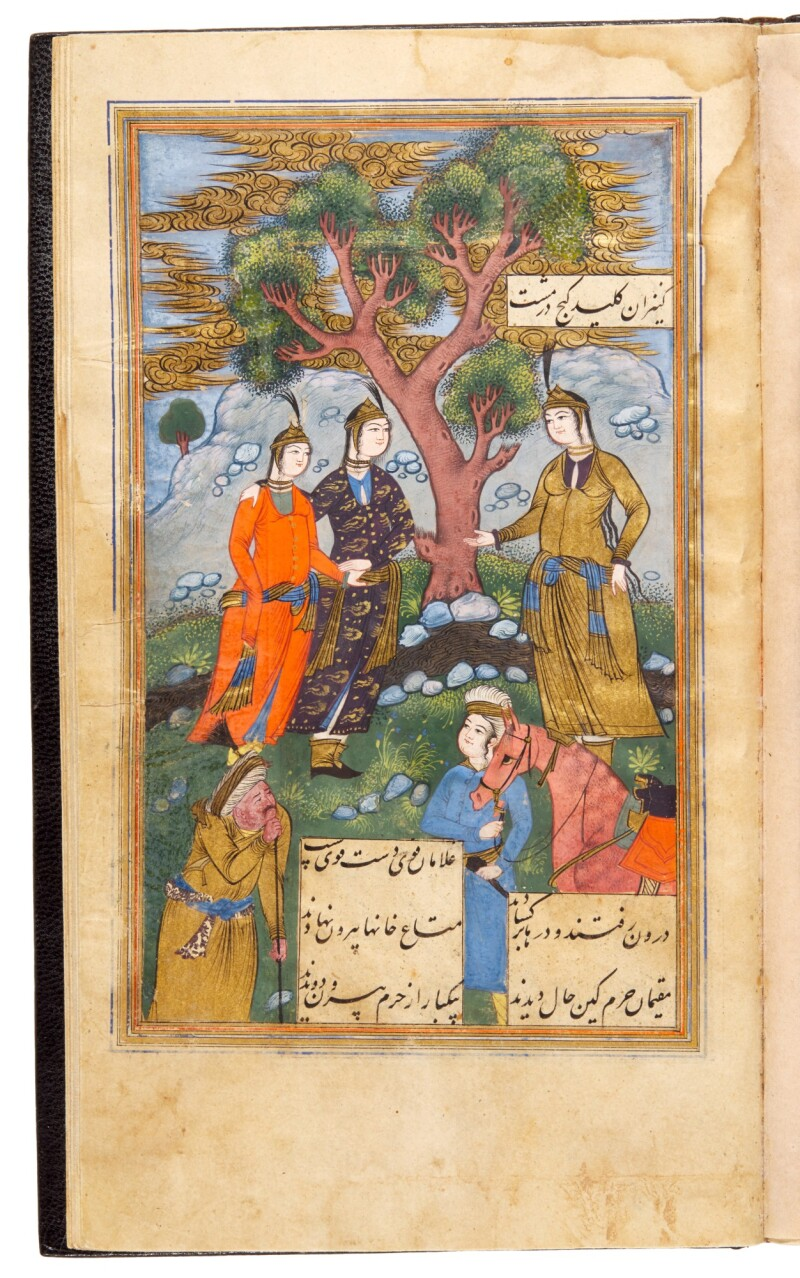
One of Qasim's miniatures for Vahshi Baqfi's Farhad and Shirin copied by Muhammad Hakim al-Husayni, 1636–37

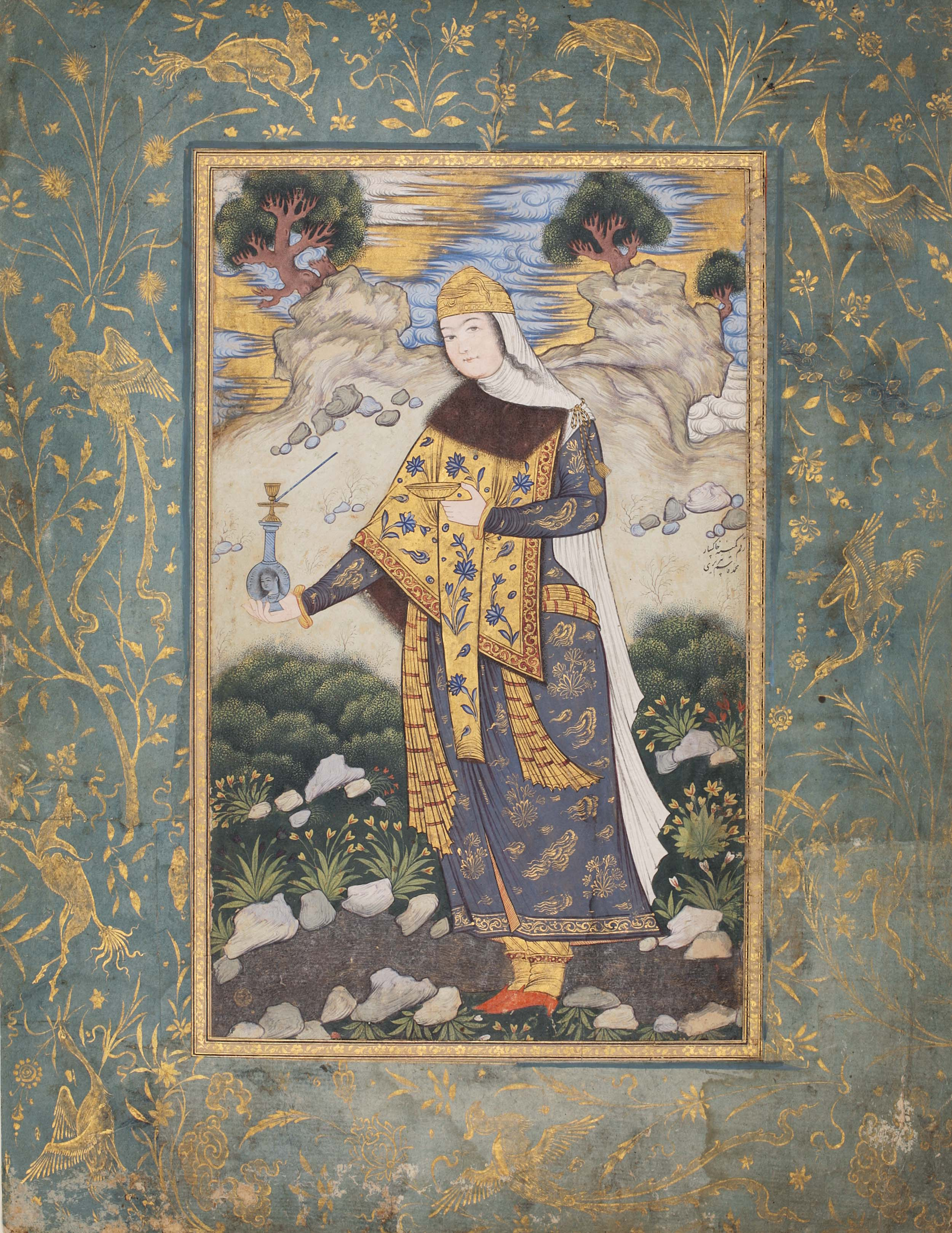
"A woman preparing a shisha". 1640–50 Khalili Collections

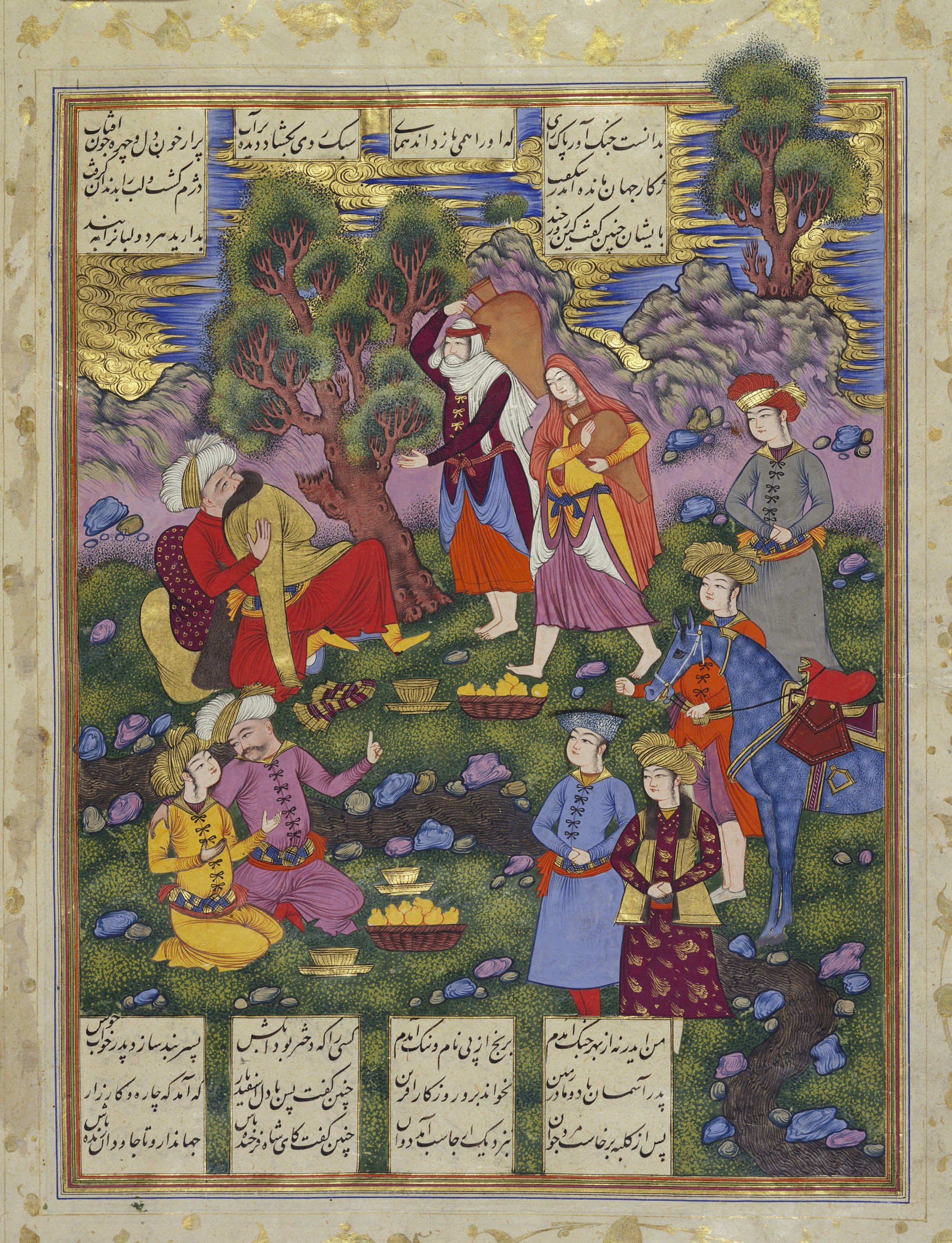
"Isfandiyar in disguise is recognised by his sisters". c. 1648. Royal Collection

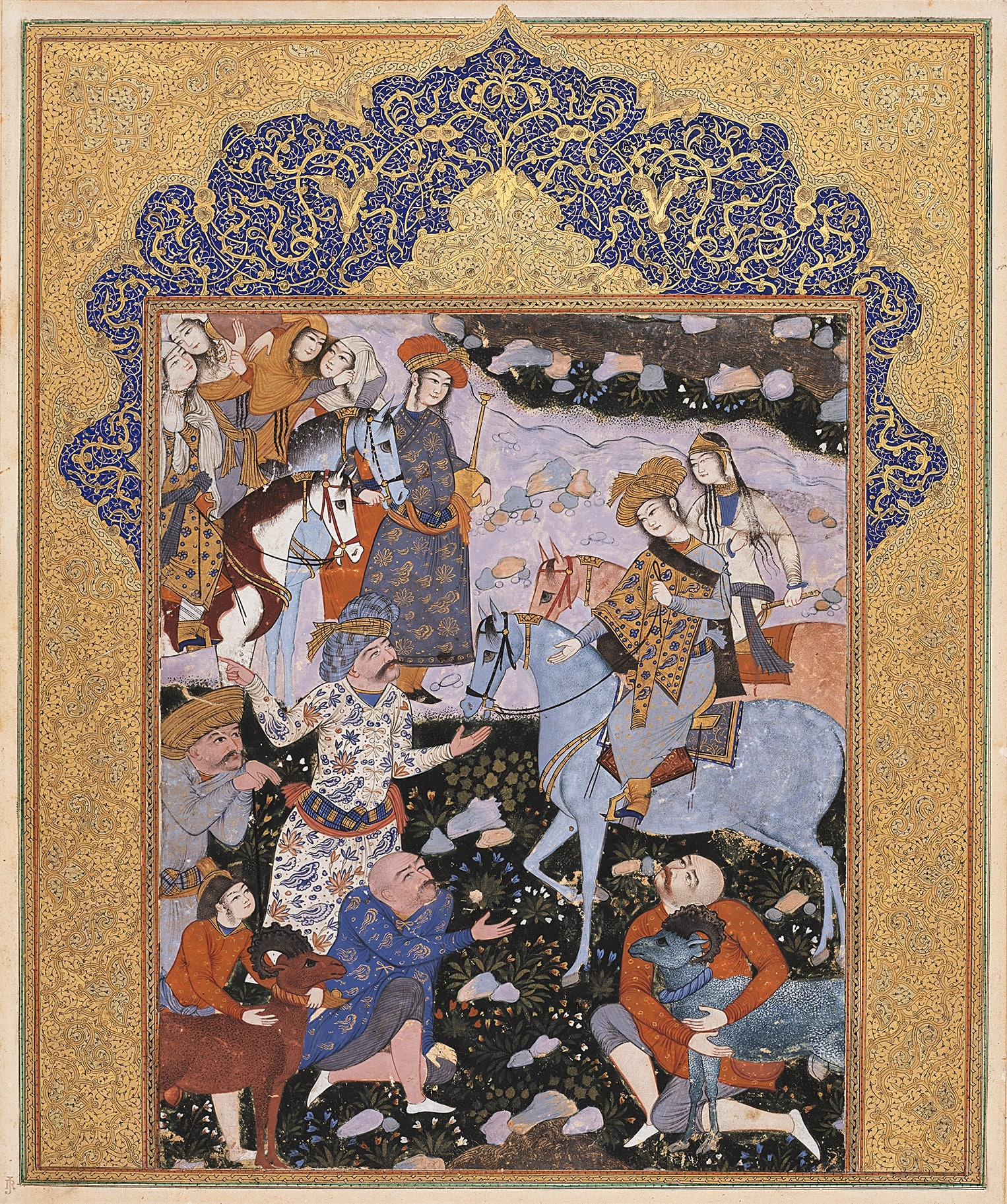
"Shepherds and nobles welcome a mounted prince and princess", c. 1648. Rietberg Museum

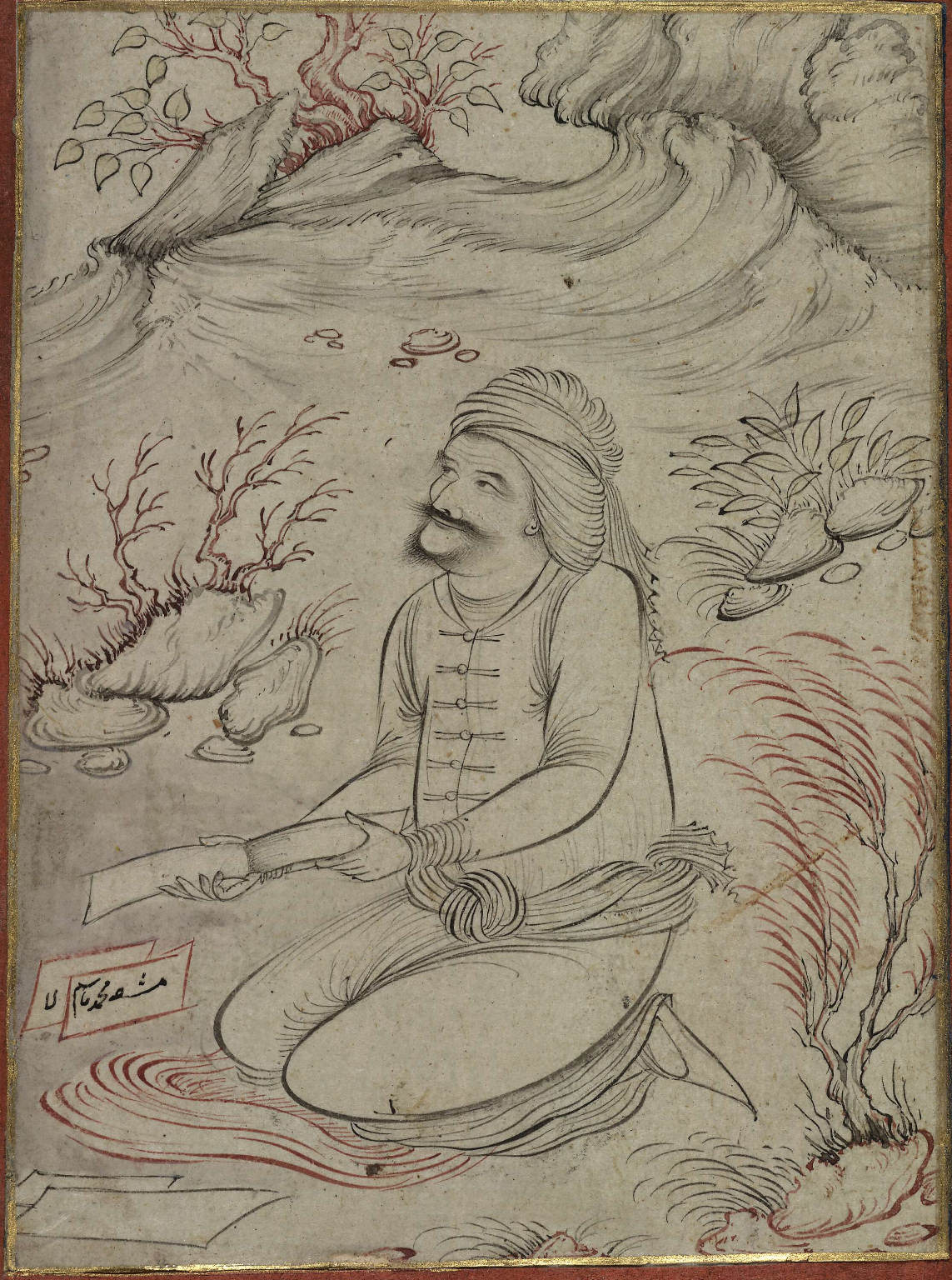
"Man holding an album", c. 1650

== Gallery ==
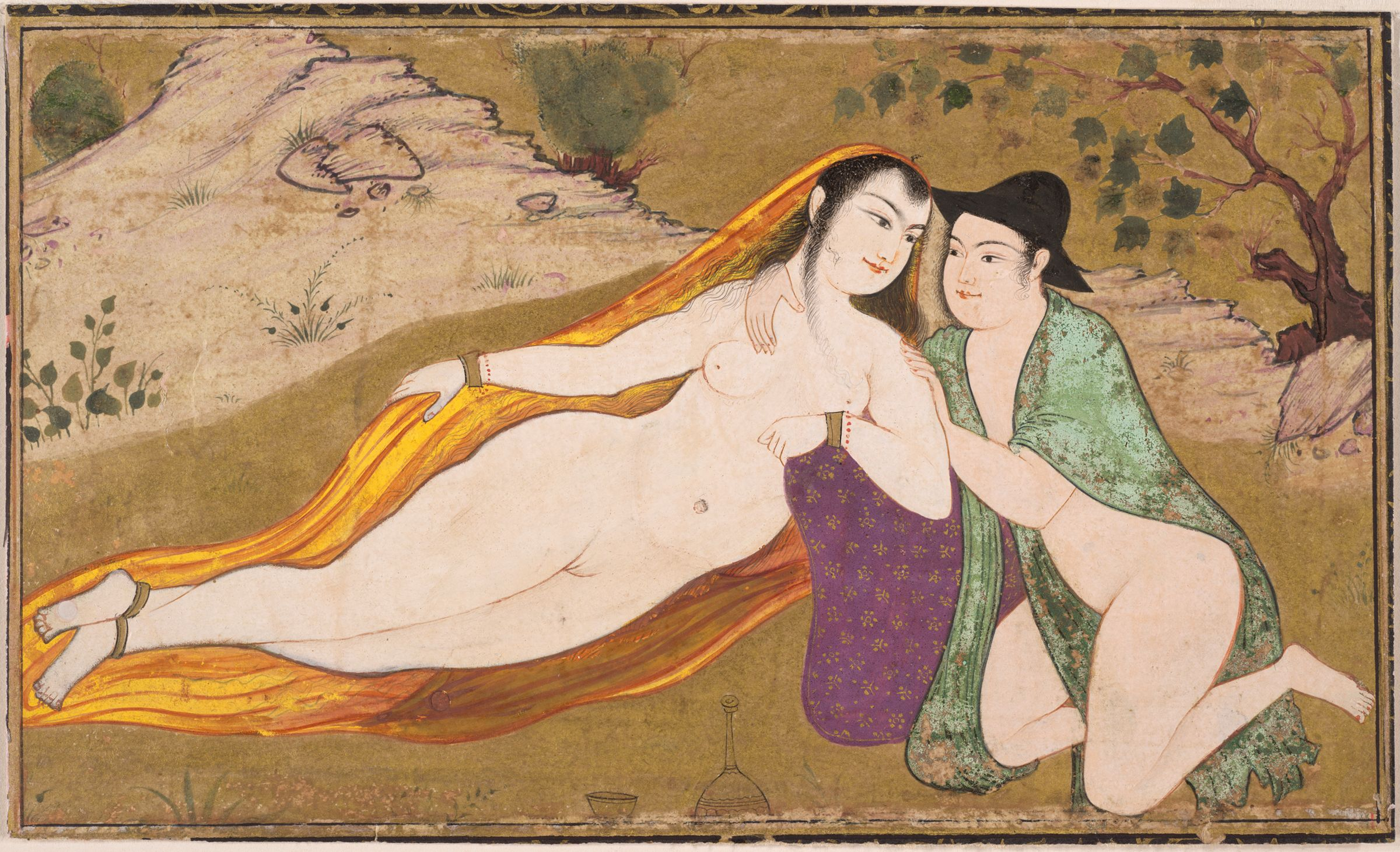
"Lovers' Dalliance". Harvard Art Museums

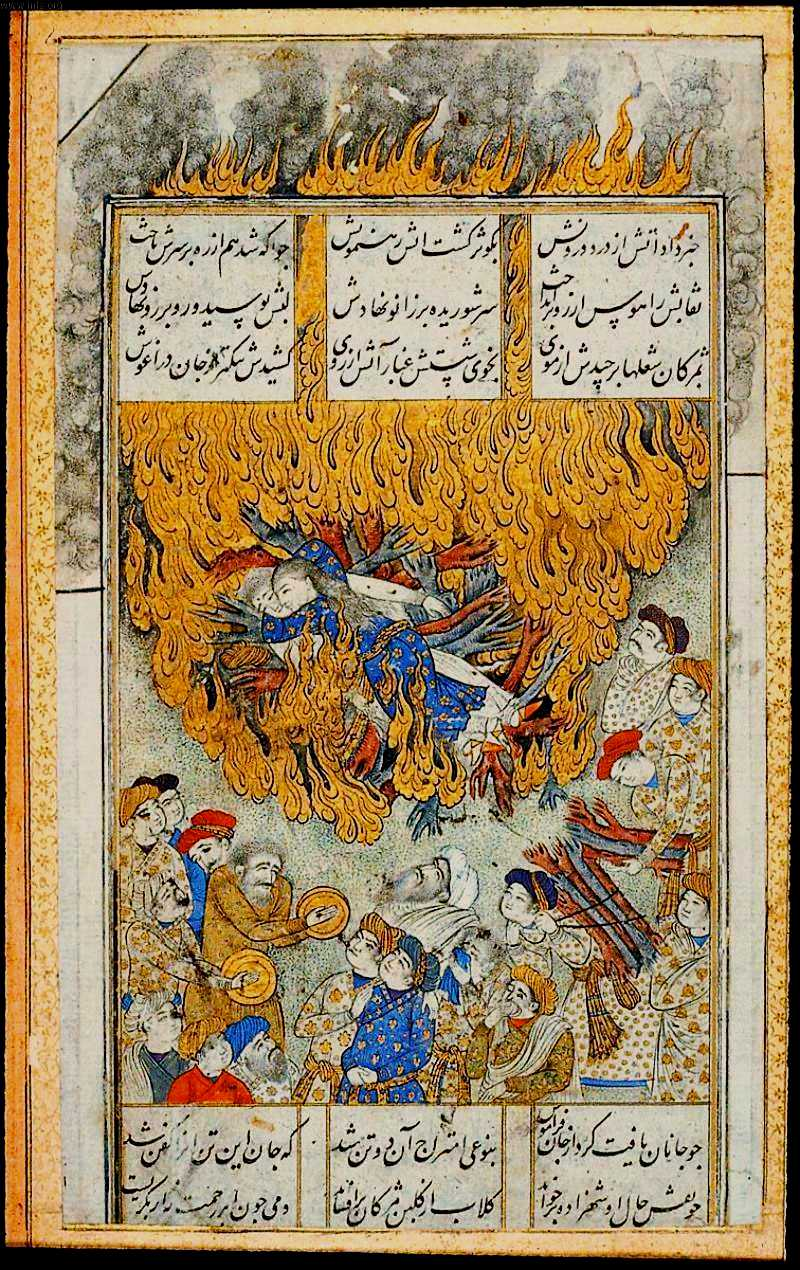
"Bride throwing herself onto her husband's funeral pyre", first half of 17th century, Museum of Fine Arts, Boston

== Sources ==
- Adamova, Adel' Tigranovna (2003). "Muhammad Qasim and the Isfahan School of Painting". In Newman, Andrew J. (ed.). Society and Culture in the Early Modern Middle East. University of Edinburgh. pp. 193–212. ISBN 978-9004127746.
- Canby, Sheila R. (1996). "Farangi Saz". In Tilden, Jill (ed.). Silk and Stone. Hali Publications. ISBN 978-1898113201.
