= Mohammad Yusef the Painter =

Persian miniaturist (17th century)

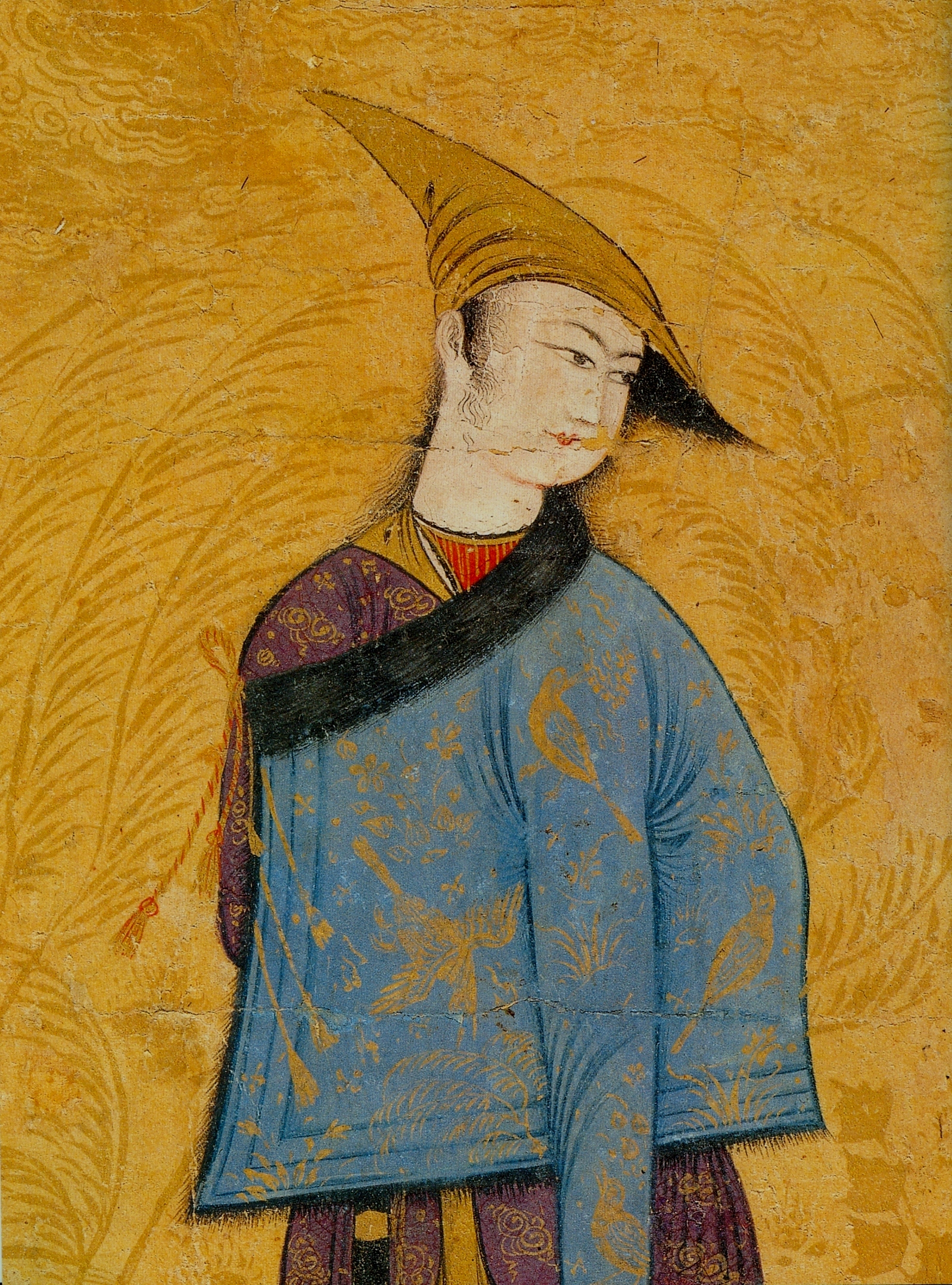
Depiction of a young man by Mohammad Yusef

Mohammad Yusef the Painter (Persian: محمد یوسف نگارگر) was a Safavid era Persian painter of the Isfahan school. He was an apprentice of Reza Abbasi. The Shahnameh of Rashida is attributed to him. It seems that he and Mohammad Qasem were close co-workers, as their names are usually mentioned together. The Windsor Shahnameh (also known as the Shahnameh of Qarachaqay Khan) contains 148 or 149 miniatures, all of them are attributed to Mohammad Yusef and Mohammad Qasem, except the first two miniatures. The miniatures of this Shahnameh are very similar to the miniatures of the Shahnameh of Rashida, and therefore it has been suggested that these manuscripts of Shahnameh have been prepared by same painters.

== Miniatures ==
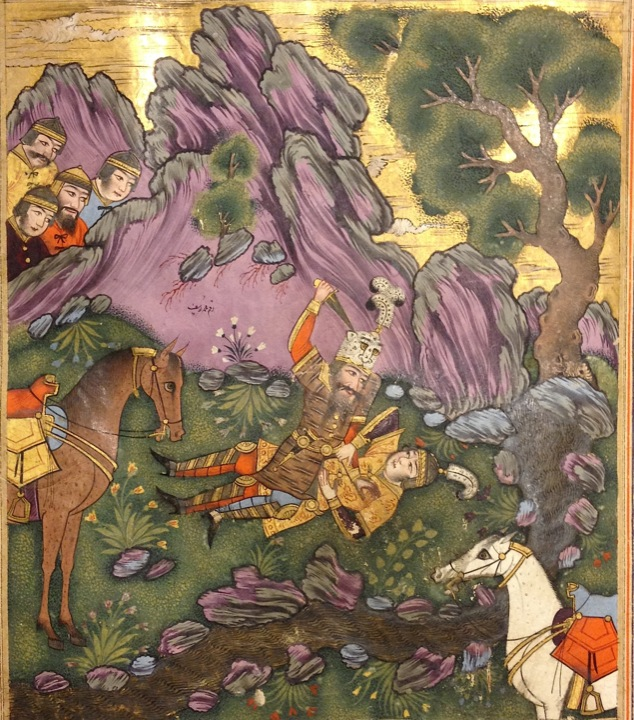
Depiction of Rostam and Sohrab, 1640, signed by Mohammad Yusef the Painter
IO Islamic 3682, f.92r
