= Shahnameh of Rashida =

Illustrated manuscript

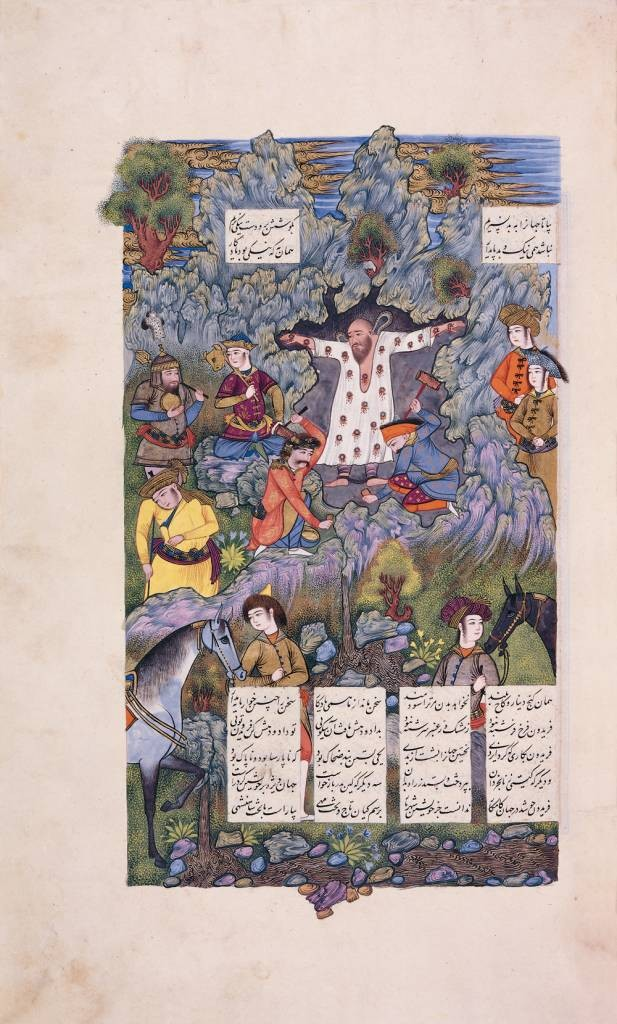
A page from the Shahnameh of Rashida, Fereydun nails Zahhak to the walls of a cave in Mount Damavand.

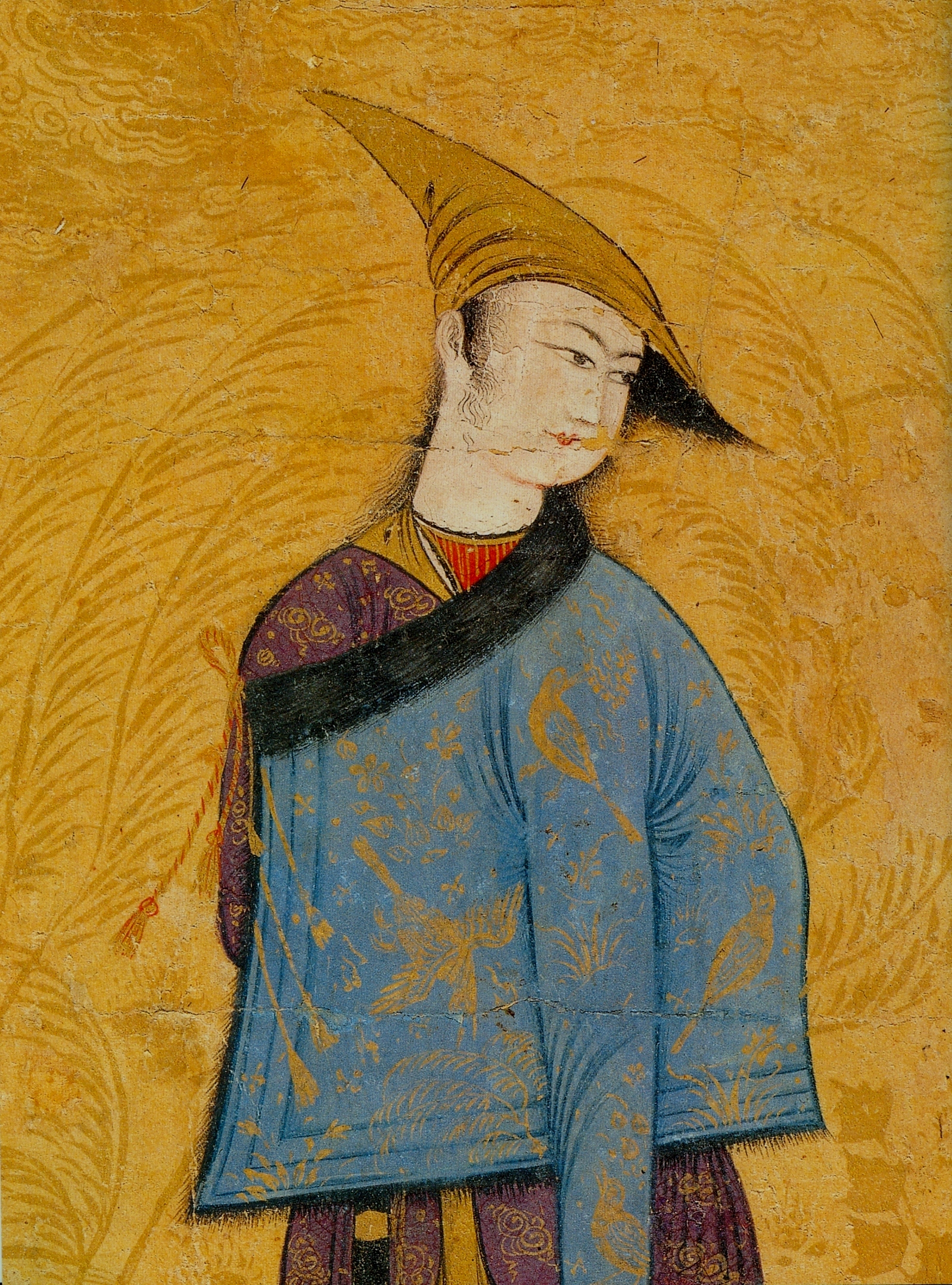
The miniatures of this manuscript have been attributed to Mohammad Yusef

The Shahnameh of Rashidā (Persian: شاهنامهٔ رشیدا) is an illustrated manuscript of the Shahnameh, the national epic of Greater Iran. It contains 738 pages with 93 miniatures in Isfahan School. The miniatures have been attributed to Mohammad Yusef, a Safavid-era painter. This manuscript dates from the 17th century and now it is located in the Golestan Palace. The calligraphy of this manuscript has been attributed to ʿAbd al-Rashid Daylami and for this reason, it is called the "Rashida Shahnameh".

The miniatures of this Shahnameh are very similar to the miniatures of the Windsor Shahnameh so it has been suggested that these manuscripts have been prepared by the same painters.
