= Akile Hatun =

Wife of Ottoman Sultan Osman II

- Born: Constantinople, Ottoman Empire
- Died: after 1627; Constantinople, Ottoman Empire
- Spouse: Osman II (m. 1622; died 1622) Ganizade Nadiri Efendi (m. 1627)
Names
- Turkish: Rukiye Akile Hatun; Ottoman Turkish: عقیلہ خاتون
- House: Ottoman (by marriage)
- Father: Hocazade Esad Efendi
- Mother: Daughter of Bostanzade Mehmed Efendi
- Religion: Sunni Islam

Rukiye Akile Hatun (Turkish pronunciation: [ak̟ʰile hatʰun]; Ottoman Turkish: عقیله خاتون, lit. 'charming' and 'intelligence'; died after 1627), called also Akile Hanım, was the second legal wife of Sultan Osman II of the Ottoman Empire.

== Family ==
Akile Hatun was the daughter of Şeyhülislam Hocazade Esad Efendi (1570 – 1625), member of one of the most venerated ulema lineages in Ottoman history. Her mother was the daughter of Bostanzâde Mehmed Efendi (died 1598), who had served as the chief mufti under Sultan Murad III, and his son Sultan Mehmed III. She had three brothers named Ebusaid Mehmed Efendi (1593-94 – 1662), who also served as a Şeyhülislam, Arif Mehmed Efendi (died 1622), and Ebussuud Efendi (died 1682). She was the granddaughter of esteemed Hoca Sadeddin Efendi (1536-37 – 1599), royal tutor, müfti, historian and founder of a veritable dynasty of prominent religious officials (two of his five sons and three of his grandsons held the post of müfti, while two of his others sons held the post of chief justice).

== Marriage ==
From the time the Ottomans endeavored to transform themselves from an outstanding family of ghazis, whose status vis-à-vis other prominent ghazi families was that of primus inter pares, into a ruling dynasty from which sovereignty emanated, one of the most fundamental notions that guided this ruling house was the prerequisite of avoiding consequential ties with the free aristocracy within the society. However, in 1622, Osman considered marrying Akile. At first, Esad Efendi refused the sultan's intention to marry his daughter, because such a marriage would constitute a serious break in the Ottoman dynastic tradition. The bailo Giustinian noted that Osman was considered to be capricious and immature in the eyes of his people and that he acted without first consulting his advisors. Moreover, according to the bailo, the marriage was seen as a new practice that could harm the well-being of the empire.

Meanwhile, the government viziers were concerned in that the sultan's marriage to the daughter of the mufti could disrupt the delicate balance of power in the imperial court for it would enable Esad Efendi to exert more influence over the sultan, thus emergence of an alternative focus of power among them. In the end, despite his initial refusal, Esad Efendi complied with the sultan's demand to marry his daughter. As the wedding dowry, Osman gave 600,000 gold coins to his new father-in-law. The marriage was celebrated in the Old Palace with fireworks on 19 March 1622, only a few months before Osman's death. Acting as the sultan's proxy in the marriage was the prominent Jelveti sheikh Üsküdari Mahmud, among whose followers figured Esad Efendi.

The Venetian bailo commented on the marriage by saying that Esad Efendi had accepted it simply to dissuade Osman from undertaking the Pilgrimage. Nevizade Atai, compiler of a seventeenth century ulema biography, described Esad Efendi as "a second Edebali" because he was honored by the tie of marriage to the dynasty and foremost among the ulema. By the marriage of Akile to Osman her father's relations with the sultan cooled, in part at least because of the marriage. Her marriage with Osman was a sharp break with the dynasty's tradition of avoiding legal alliances, especially with high born Muslim women and it contributed to the popular discontent that culminated in his deposition.

The sight of Akile, a free born Muslim of exceptional pedigree, passing through the Babüssaade and into the harem must have seemed an inconceivable nightmare to an Ottoman. However, privy purse accounts suggest that Akile never entered the harem of the imperial palace. Certainly this free born Muslim woman of great status would have been an anomaly in a household composed of slaves, and her presence disruptive of the harem's established hierarchies. An incident related by the Venetian ambassador Simon Contarini in his 1612 report suggests that the prospect of a free Muslim woman residing within the imperial harem may have been an important element in the unpopularity of the marriage.

After Osman's death in May 1622, she married Ganizade Nadiri Efendi in 1627, a famous Ottoman scholar, poet and calligrapher.

== In popular culture ==
- In 2015 Turkish historical non-fiction TV series Muhteşem Yüzyıl: Kösem, Akile Hatun is portrayed by Turkish actress Bahar Selvi. In the series, she is called Akile Hanim and is the mother of Şehzade Mustafa and Zeynep Sultan. In the series, the twins born shortly before Osman's death and not six months after it.

== Ancestry ==
Ancestors of Akile Hatun

16. İsfahanlı Hâfız Muhammed
8. Hasan Can Efendi
4. Hoca Sadeddin Efendi
2. Hocazade Esad Efendi
1. Akile Hatun
12. Bostan Mustafa Efendi
6. Bostanzâde Mehmed Efendi
3. Daughter
