= Ayşe Sultan (Haseki of Osman II) =

Haseki Sultan of the Ottoman Empire (Imperial Consort)
- Tenure: c. 1619 – 20 May 1622
- Predecessor: Kösem Sultan
- Successor: Ayşe Sultan; Unnamed Second Haseki
- Died: c. 1640; Old Palace, Constantinople, Ottoman Empire
- Consort: Osman II
Names
- Turkish: Ayşe Sultan; Ottoman Turkish: عایشه سلطان
- House: House of Osman

Ayşe Sultan (Ottoman Turkish: عایشه سلطان; died c. 1640) was a consort of Sultan Osman II of the Ottoman Empire, and his Haseki sultan.

== Life ==
Her name appears in privy purse registers from 1619 on, but nothing is known about her except her name. Her origin is unknown, but the consorts of the Ottoman sultans were customarily concubines who came to the Ottoman Imperial harem via the Ottoman slave trade.

According to Peirce, Ayşe was Osman's haseki sultan. But according to Piterberg, Osman II did not have a haseki and Ayşe was just "a politically insignificant consort." Even though her status is debatable, it is clear that Ayşe could not become a prominent female figure like other haseki sultans, so much so that, during his reign, Osman II favored other concubines over her, for example Meylişah Hatun, who bore him his firstborn, Şehzade Ömer. Also, a governess (daye hatun, lit. wet-nurse) who was appointed as a stand-in valide, could not counterbalance the contriving of Mustafa I's mother in the Old Palace. This condition made the conspicuous absence of a female power basis in the harem during her spouse's reign the basic and exceptional weakness from which Osman II suffered.

After Osman's death in 1622 she stayed in the Old Palace. Privy Purse records her presence lastly in 1640.

== Sources ==
- Peirce, Leslie P. (1993). The Imperial Harem: Women and Sovereignty in the Ottoman Empire. Oxford University Press. ISBN 978-0-19-508677-5.
- Uluçay, M. Çağatay (2011). Padişahların Kadınları ve Kızları. Ötüken Neşriyat.

Ottoman royalty
Preceded by Kösem Sultan	Haseki Sultan; 1619 – 20 May 1622	Succeeded by Ayşe Sultan
