= Hocazade Esad Efendi =

Ottoman Empire chief of Islamic (1570–1625)

Sheikh-ul-Islam of the Ottoman Empire
- In office 2 July 1615 – 21 May 1622
- Monarchs: Ahmed I Mustafa I Osman II
- Preceded by: Hocazade Mehmed Efendi
- Succeeded by: Zekeriyazade Yahya Efendi
- In office 4 October 1623 – 22 May 1625
- Monarch: Murad IV
- Preceded by: Zekeriyazade Yahya Efendi
- Succeeded by: Zekeriyazade Yahya Efendi

Personal details
- Born: 14 June 1570 Istanbul, Ottoman Empire
- Died: 22 May 1625 (aged 54) Istanbul, Ottoman Empire
- Spouse: Daughter of Bostanzâde Mehmed Efendi
- Children: Ebusaid Mehmed Efendi; Arif Mehmed Efendi; Ebussuud Efendi; Akile Hatun
- Parent: Hoca Sadeddin Efendi (father)

Hocazade Esad Efendi (Ottoman Turkish: خواجه زادہ اسد افندی; 14 June 1570 – 22 May 1625) was a Şeyhülislam (Minister of Islamic Issues) of the Ottoman Empire from 1615 to 1622, and again in 1623 until his death in 1625.

== Early life ==
Hocazade Esad Efendi was born in Istanbul, on 14 June 1570. He was the second son of Hoca Sadeddin Efendi. He had four brothers, Mehmed Efendi (died 1615), Mesud Efendi (died 1597), Abdülaziz Efendi (died 1618), Salih Efendi. He was educated by his father and famous scholar Molla Tevfik Gialni.

== Career ==
At first he attended the place as an apprentice officer (Mülazım), later in 1588, he took haseki rank and became the personal bodyguard of the Sultan. In 1590, he was designated to Süleymaniye School and in July, 1593 Darulhadise (information office).

Later, he became the kadi (Islamic judge) of Edirne by the time of Eğri campaign in 1596.

He was promoted in a short time, by his father's influence in the Palace and he was designated to the Kazasker rank (chief military judge). After his father became the Şeyhülislam, he became the kadi of Istanbul.

Yemişçi Hasan Pasha was an ally of Esad Efendi and his elder brother Mehmed. However, in January 1603 he was dismissed from the position following the Celali rebellions.

On 2 July 1615, he replaced his elder brother Mehmed Efendi after his death, and became the Şeyhülislam, minister of Islamic Issues. On 21 May 1622, he resigned from the position. However, on 4 October 1623, he was reappointed to the position until his death in 1625.

== Family ==
Esad Efendi was married to the daughter of Bostanzâde Mehmed Efendi (died 1598), who had served as the chief mufti under Sultan Murad III, and his son Sultan Mehmed III. He had three sons named Ebusaid Mehmed Efendi (1593-94 – 1662), who also served as a Şeyhülislam, Arif Mehmed Efendi (died 1622), and Ebussuud Efendi (died 1682), and a daughter named Akile Hatun, who married firstly to Sultan Osman II in March 1622, and secondly to Ganizade Nadiri Efendi in 1627.

== Death ==
Esad Efendi died on 22 May 1625, and was buried beside his father in Eyüp Cemetery, Istanbul.

== In popular culture ==
In 2015 Turkish costume drama TV series Muhteşem Yüzyıl: Kösem, Esad Efendi is portrayed by Turkish actor Halil Kumova.

== See also ==
- List of Sheikh-ul-Islams of the Ottoman Empire

== Sources ==
- Çörekçi, Semra (2012). A tribute to the kingly virtues of Sultan Ahmed I (r. 1603-1617): Hocazade Abdülaziz Efendi (d. 1618) and his Ahlak-ı Sultan Ahmedi. Istanbul Şehir University.
- Özdemir, Mehmet (2011). Mütercim ve Müellif Bir Şeyhülislam: Hocazade Esad ve Eserleri / The Life of Hocazade Es'ad Efendi, a Sheikhulislam, Author and Interpreter and His Works.
