= Osman II =

Sultan of the Ottoman Empire from 1618 to 1622

- Custodian of the Two Holy Mosques
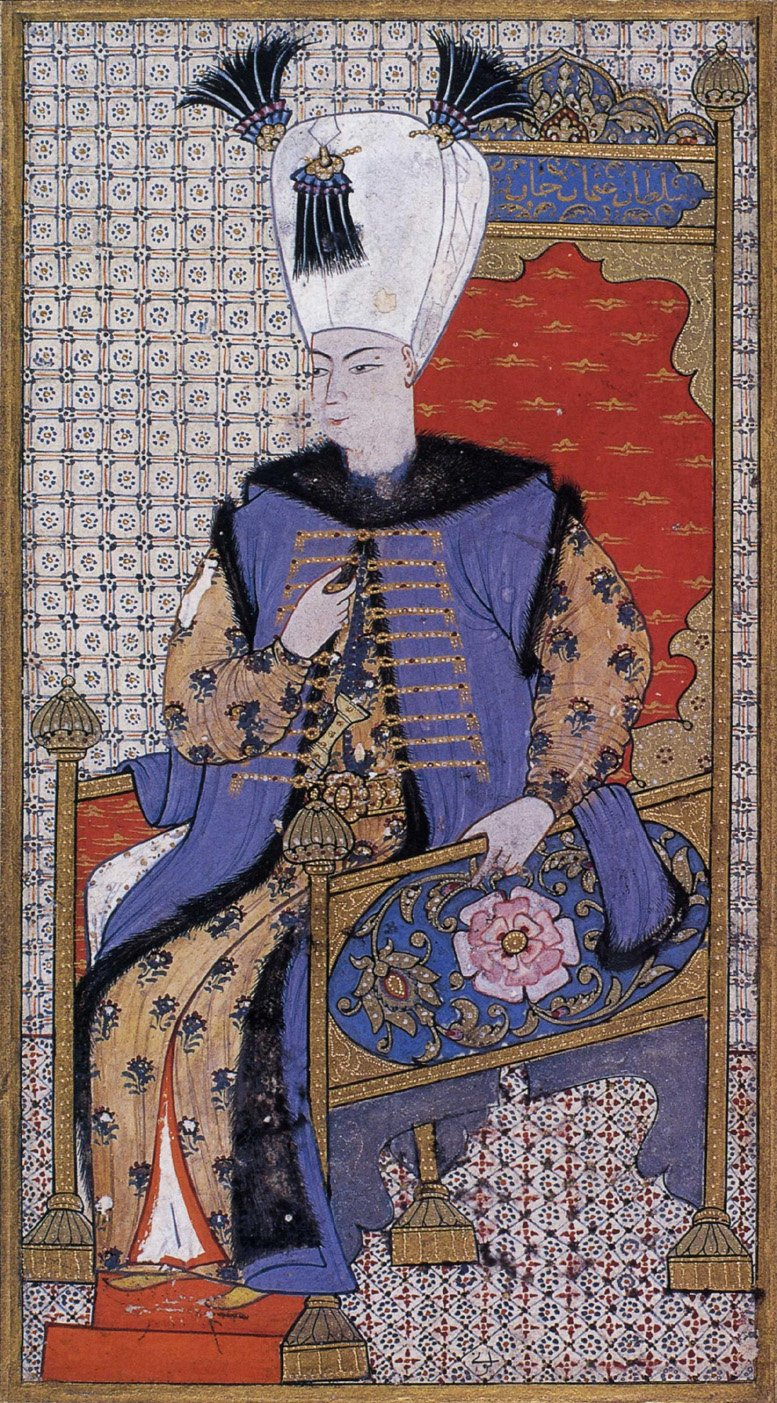
- Osman II at his coronation in Istanbul, in Ottoman miniature

Sultan of the Ottoman Empire (Padishah)
- Reign: 26 February 1618 – 20 May 1622
- Predecessor: Mustafa I
- Successor: Mustafa I

Ottoman Caliph (Amir al-Mu'minin)
- Predecessor: Mustafa I
- Successor: Mustafa I
- Born: 3 November 1604; Topkapı Palace, Constantinople, Ottoman Empire
- Died: 20 May 1622 (aged 17); Yedikule Fortress, Constantinople, Ottoman Empire
- Burial: Sultan Ahmed Mosque, Istanbul
- Consorts: Ayşe Sultan; Meylişah Hatun; Fülane Hatun; Akile Hatun
- Issue: Şehzade Ömer; Şehzade Mustafa; Zeynep Sultan
Names
- Şah Osman bin Ahmed han
- Dynasty: Ottoman
- Father: Ahmed I
- Mother: Mahfiruz Hatun
- Religion: Sunni Islam
- Tughra

Osman II (Ottoman Turkish: عثمان ثانى ‘Osmān-i sānī; Turkish: II. Osman; 3 November 1604 – 20 May 1622), also known as Osman the Young (Turkish: Genç Osman), was the sultan of the Ottoman Empire from 26 February 1618 until his regicide on 20 May 1622.

== Early life ==
Osman II was born at Topkapı Palace, Constantinople, the son of Sultan Ahmed I (1603–1617) and one of his consorts Mahfiruz Hatun. According to later traditions, at a young age, his mother had paid a great deal of attention to Osman's education, as a result of which Osman II became a known poet and was believed to have mastered many languages, including Arabic, Persian, Greek, Latin, and Italian; although this has since been refuted. Osman was born eleven months after his father Ahmed's transition to the throne. He was trained in the palace. According to foreign observers, he was one of the most cultured of Ottoman princes.

Osman's failure to capture the throne at the death of his father Ahmed might have been caused by the absence of a mother to lobby in his favour; his own mother was already dead by 1617.

== Reign ==
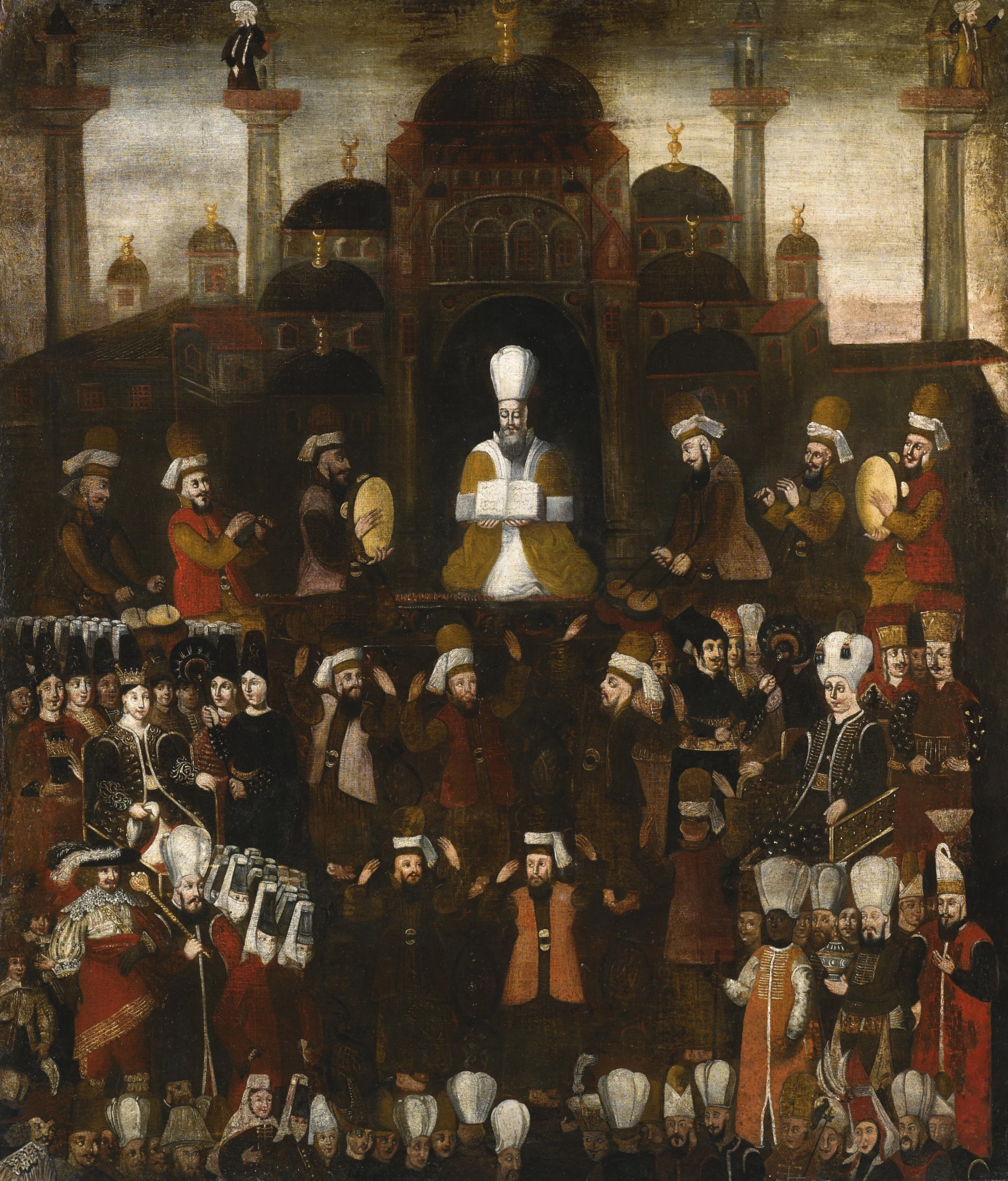
Enthronement of Sultan Osman II

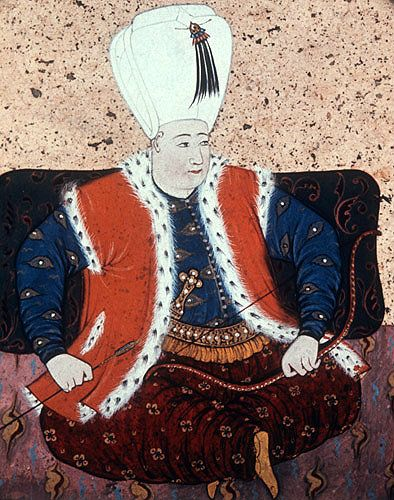
Portrait of Osman II. Kebir Musavver Silsilenâme (TSMK, A. 3109), c. 1710–20

Osman II ascended the throne at the age of 14 as the result of a coup d'état against his uncle Mustafa I "the Mad" (1617–1618, 1622–1623). Despite his youth, Osman II soon sought to assert himself as a ruler, and after securing the empire's eastern border by signing a peace treaty (Treaty of Serav) with Safavid Persia, he personally led the Ottoman campaign against Poland and King Sigismund III during the Moldavian Magnate Wars, also having his younger brother Mehmed strangled just before he left Istanbul on campaign. Forced to sign a humiliating peace treaty with the Poles after the Battle of Khotyn (Chocim) in September–October, 1621, Osman II returned home to Constantinople in shame, blaming the cowardice of the Janissaries and the insufficiency of his statesmen for his humiliation.

The basic and exceptional weakness from which Osman II suffered was the conspicuous absence of a female power basis in the harem. From 1620 until Osman's death, a governess (daye hatun, lit. wet-nurse) was appointed as a stand-in valide, and she could not counterbalance the contriving of Mustafa I's mother in the Old Palace. Although he did have a loyal chief black eunuch at his side, this could not compensate for the absence of what in the politics of that period was a winning combination, valide sultan–chief black eunuch, especially in the case of a young and very ambitious ruler. According to Piterberg, Osman II did not have haseki sultan, opposite with Peirce who claim that Ayşe was Osman's haseki. But it is clear that Ayşe was politically insignificant and she couldn't be a valide support for Osman's reign.

In the autumn of 1620, Özi Beylerbeyi İskender Pasha defeated the Poles in an expedition into Poland. However, further Polish campaigns were deterred by the Janissary forces unwilling to march on Poland. The ambassador of Sigismund III, the King of Poland, was brought into Istanbul despite the severe cold.

== Attempted reforms ==
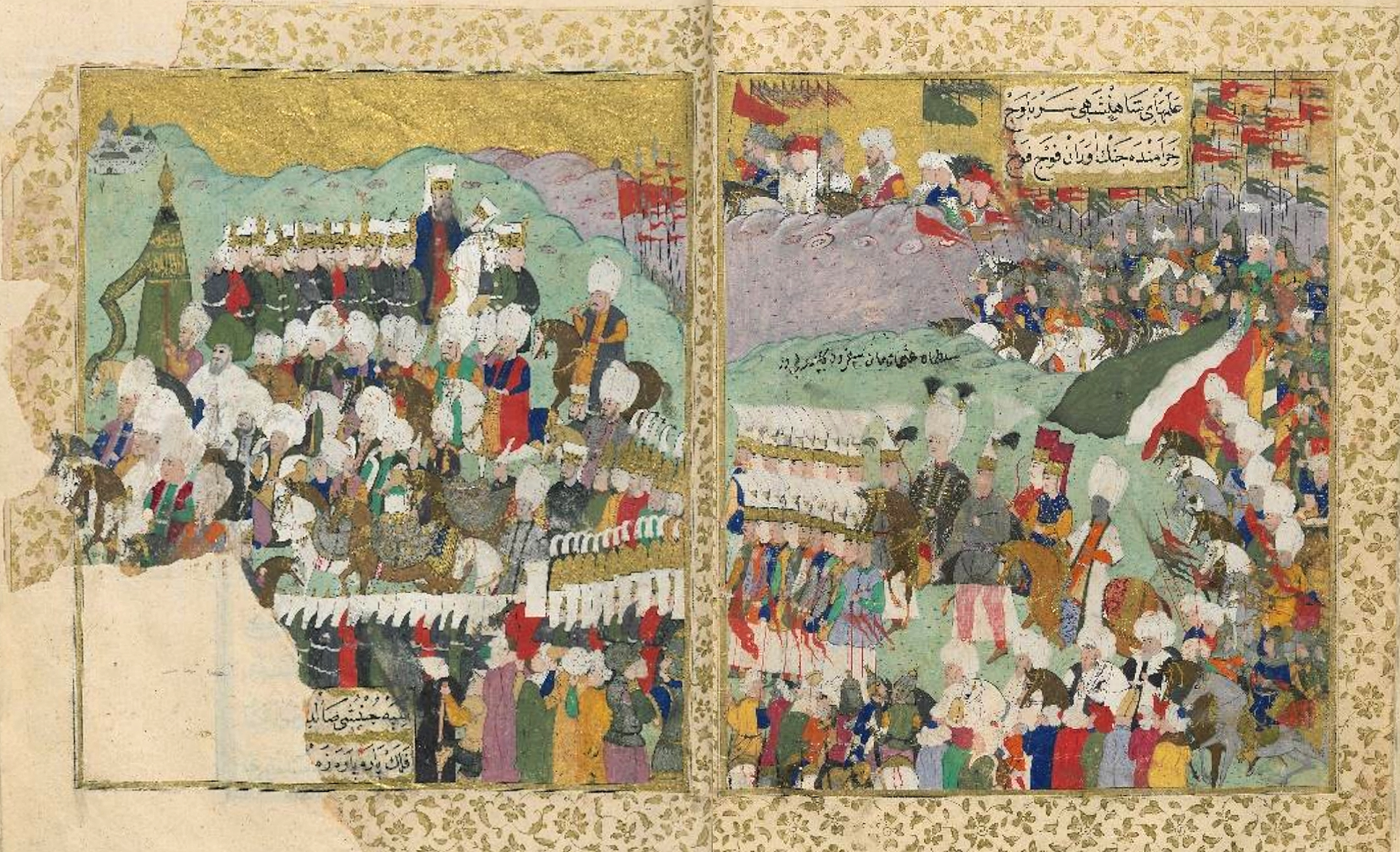
‘Osmān II and the Ottoman army proceeding for the Hotin campaign in 1621. Şehname-i Nadiri, TPML, H. 1124, 53b-54a.

After the death of Suleiman I the empire, there was period where the Janissary corps became politically influential, local leaders and jurists over the internal and external affairs of the empire had lost authority, and the power of the sultan had declined. This was showcased in 1618, by the deposition of sultan Mustafa I after only three months in power by the chief harem eunuch, Mustafa Agha, showing another example of the vastly weakened sultanate. According to one Ottoman chronicler, the 'weak-mindedness and deranged nature' of the sultan was clear. In public he reportedly would gesture repeatedly as if throwing coins onto the ground, possibly meaning he was traumatized by throwing coins to the Janissaries. Sultans had become empty shells of power, whose deposition and execution had become legal, at least according to many scholars of the time.

Upon Osman's return to the Ottoman capital of Istanbul, the young sultan hoped to retake power over the empire from the hands of the Janissaries and jurists, recentralising power in the sultan. He was aiming to dissolve the Janissary corps and replace it with a new, more loyal army, recruited from peasants and nomads of Anatolia and Syria, as well as Arab, Kurdish and Druze mercenaries. He also wished to relocate the Ottoman capital to Damascus, and planned to take the Hajj to Mecca, which no other sultan had ever done. The Janissaries and jurists strongly opposed his 'turn to the East', and the Janissaries feared the threat of a new army replacing them. Osman's ideas had made him many enemies in the empire.

=== Great winter of 1621 ===
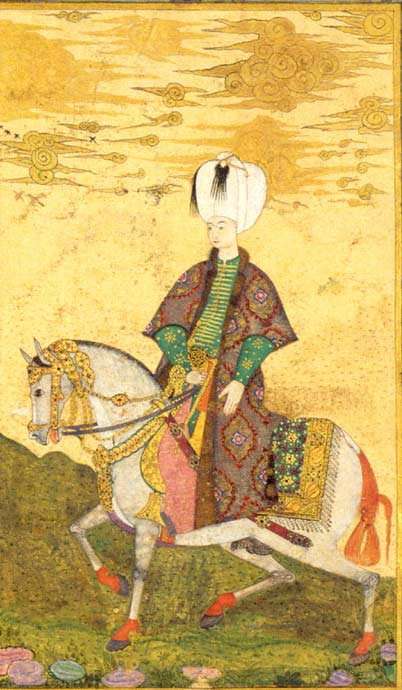
Osman II on horseback by Ahmed Naksi, 1620

Following the murder of Şehzade Mehmed on 12 January 1621, a heavy snow started falling in Istanbul. The people of Istanbul were drastically affected by the cold, which increased local violence on 24 January, more so than the palace murder. This is the biggest natural disaster that concerns the capital in Osman's four-year short reign. Bostanzade Yahya Efendi, one of those who lived through this cold, remarked that the Golden Horn and the Bosphorus were covered with ice from the end of January to beginning of February: "Between Üsküdar and Beşiktaş, the men walk around and go to Üsküdar. They came from Istanbul on foot. And the year became a gala (famine).

It was snowing for 15 days, that the frosts were frozen from the severity of the cold, but the river was open between Sarayburnu and Üsküdar. For this natural disaster, thirty thousand froze between Üsküdar and Istanbul from the cold," said Haşimi Çelebi, "The road became Üsküdar, the Mediterranean froze a thousand thirty". As a result of the inconvenience of the Zahire ships, there was a complete famine in Istanbul, and 75 kurush of bread jumped to one akche, and the oak of the meat to 15 akches.

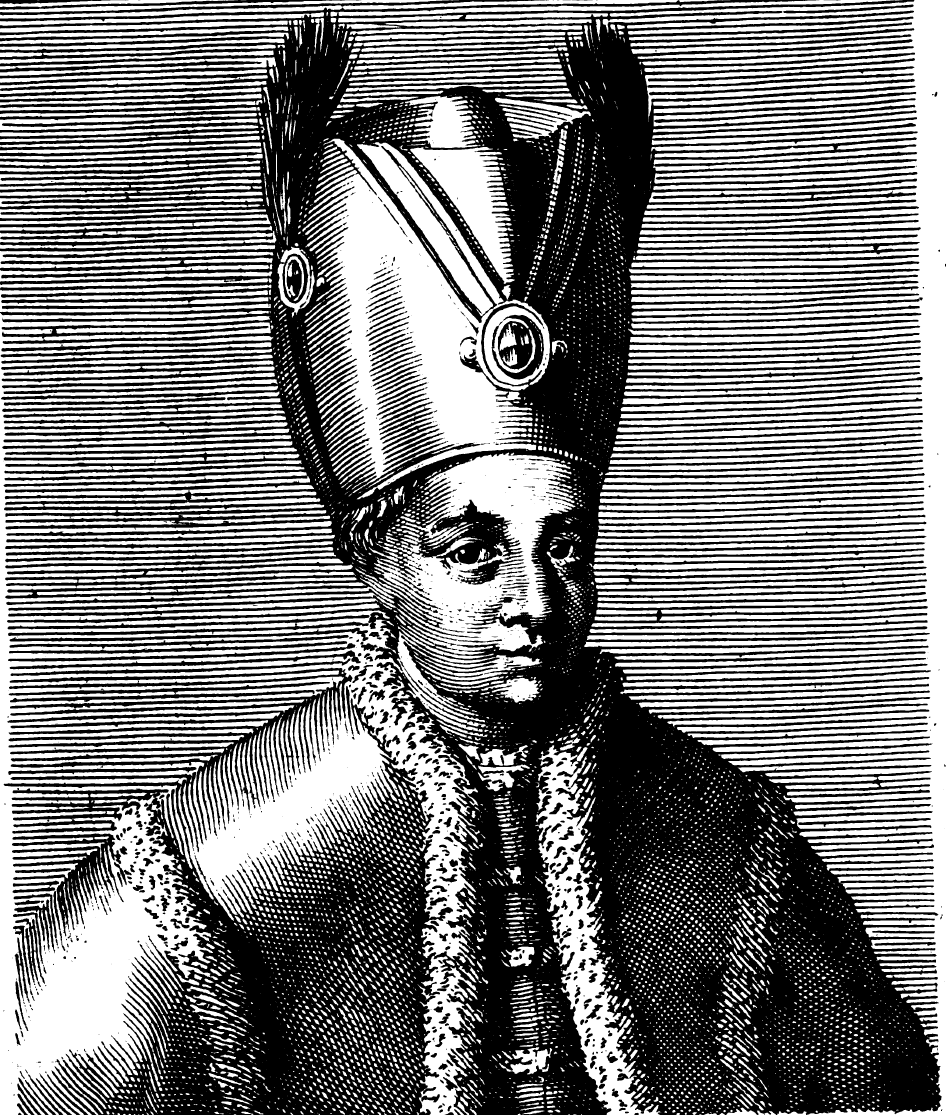
Osman II by Vigenère

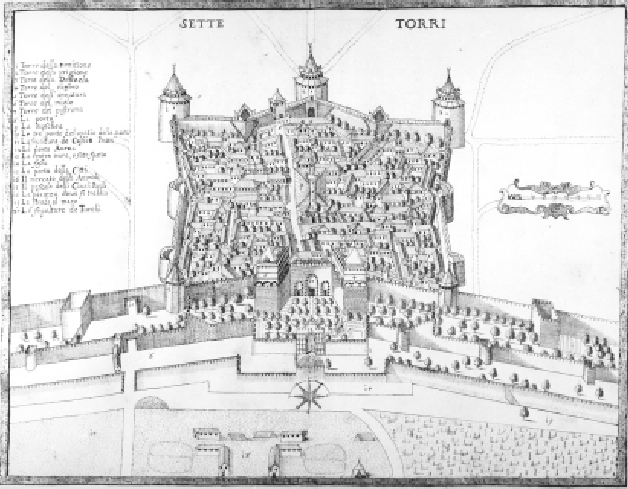
Yedikule Fortress in 1685

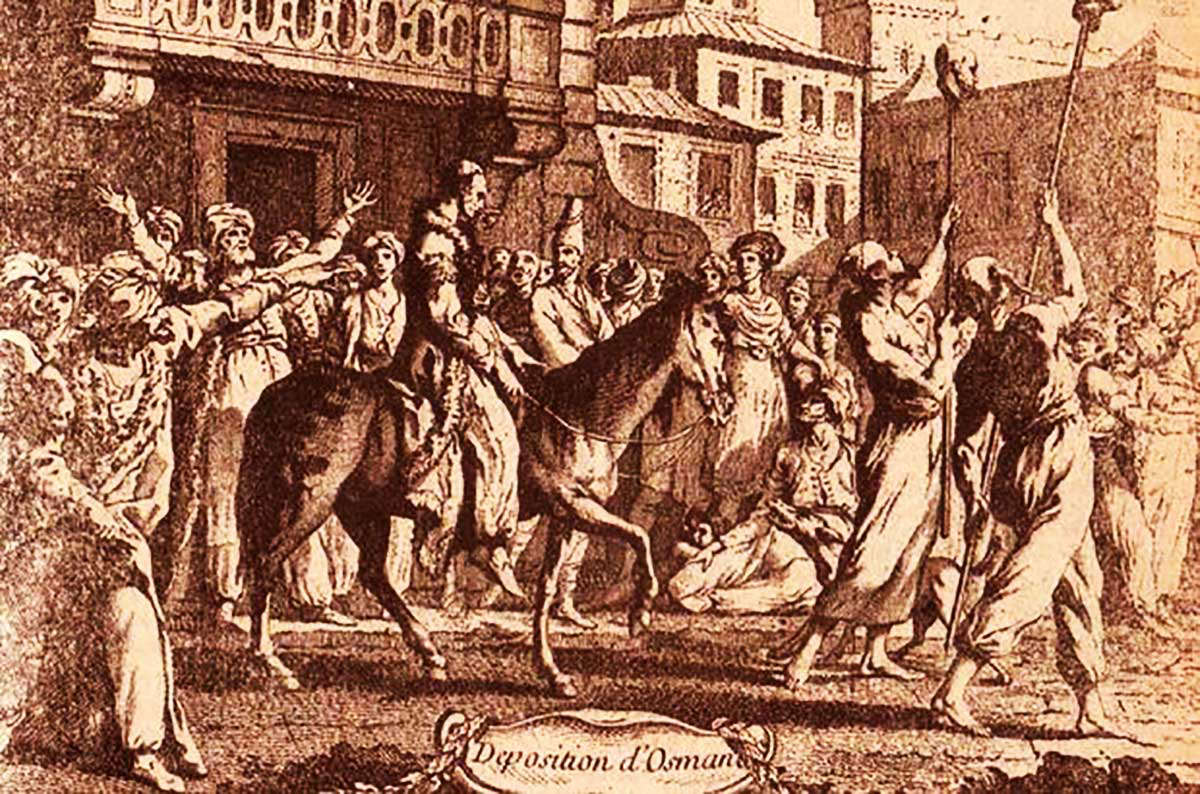
Deposition of Osman II by Jean Antoine Guer

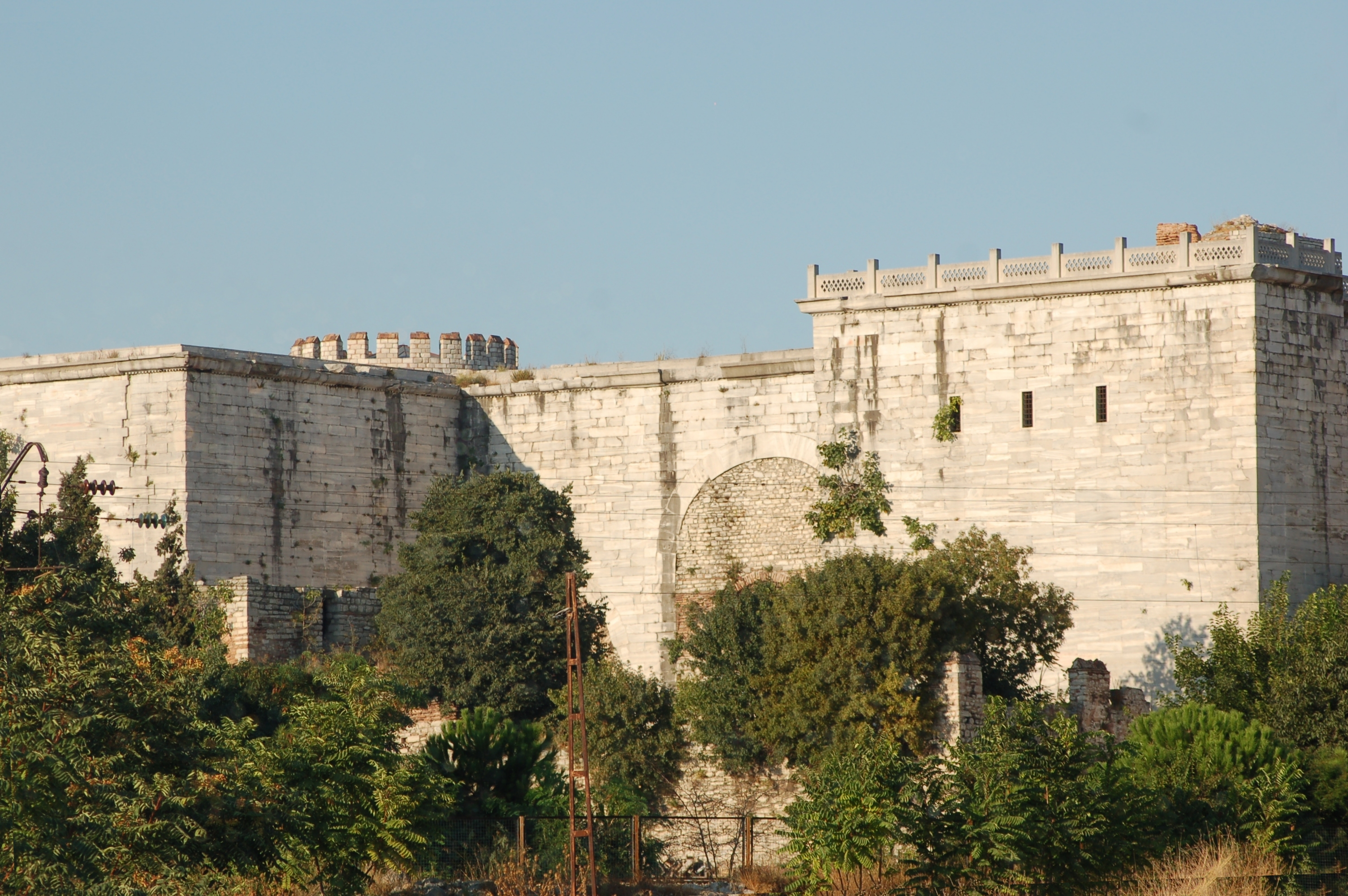
One of the entrances of the Yedikule Fortress in modern Istanbul

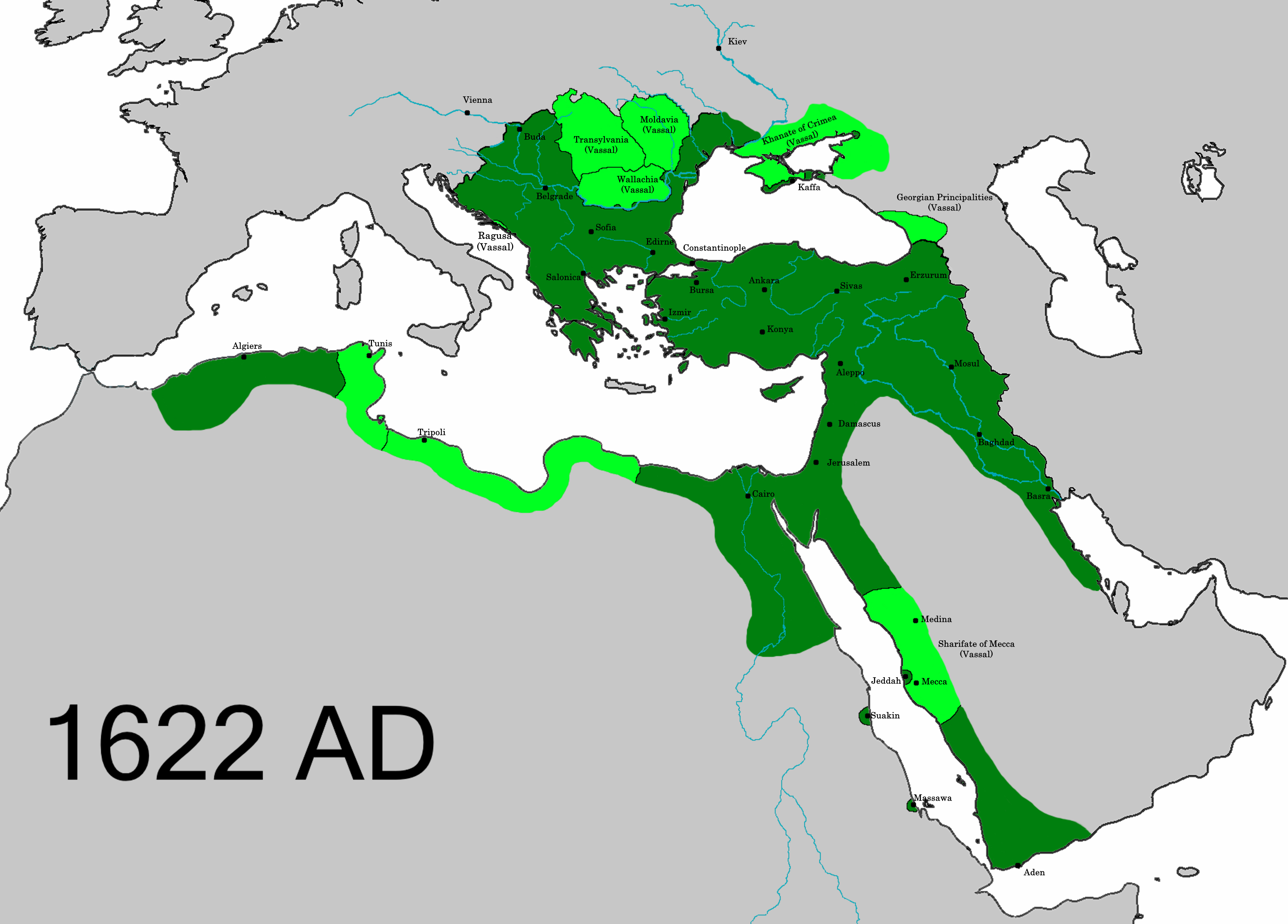
The Empire in 1622, the year Osman II died

== Death ==
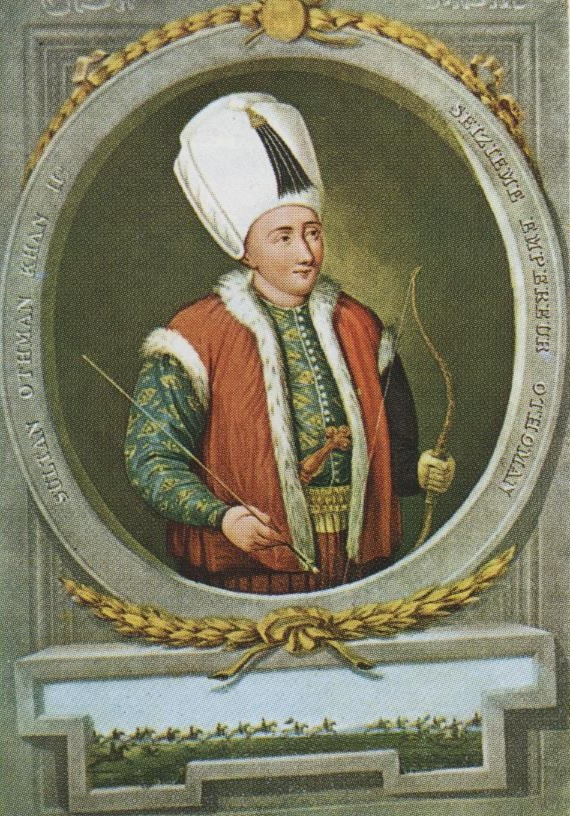
Portrait of Osman II by Konstantin Kapıdağlı, 1789–1806

Due to these reforms seeking a counterweight to Janissary influence (as well reducing the payments made to janissaries and the ulama), and Osman II closing the Janissary coffee shops (the gathering points for conspiracies against the throne), the very day Osman was due to set out recruiting his new, more loyal army a palace uprising by the janissaries began with the Janissaries killing the chief harem eunuch Suleiman Agha, then located and promptly imprisoned the young sultan in Yedikule Fortress in Istanbul, where Osman II was strangled to death. He was almost lynched on the way. Some sources state he was tortured in prison as well. After Osman's death, his ear was cut off (and possibly his nose) and presented to Halime Sultan and Sultan Mustafa I to confirm his death and Mustafa would no longer need to fear his nephew. It was the first time in the Ottoman history that a sultan was executed by the janissaries.

During his transfer to the Yedikule Dungeons, the insurgents intentionally routed the procession through the tavern district of Tahtakale. This specific trajectory was chosen due to the deep-seated animosity among the Janissaries and Sipahis, which stemmed from the alcohol and tobacco bans enacted during his reign, alongside the tavern raids the Sultan had personally led. Consequently, the deposed monarch was publicly humiliated and subjected to insults by the rebels and onlookers alike, directly in front of the venues he had previously shuttered.

This disaster is one of the most discussed topics in Ottoman history. Hasanbegzade, Karaçelebizade, Solakzade, Peçevi, Müneccimbaşı and Naima dates, in the Fezleke of Katip Çelebi, detailed and some of them were narrated in a story style.

== Family ==
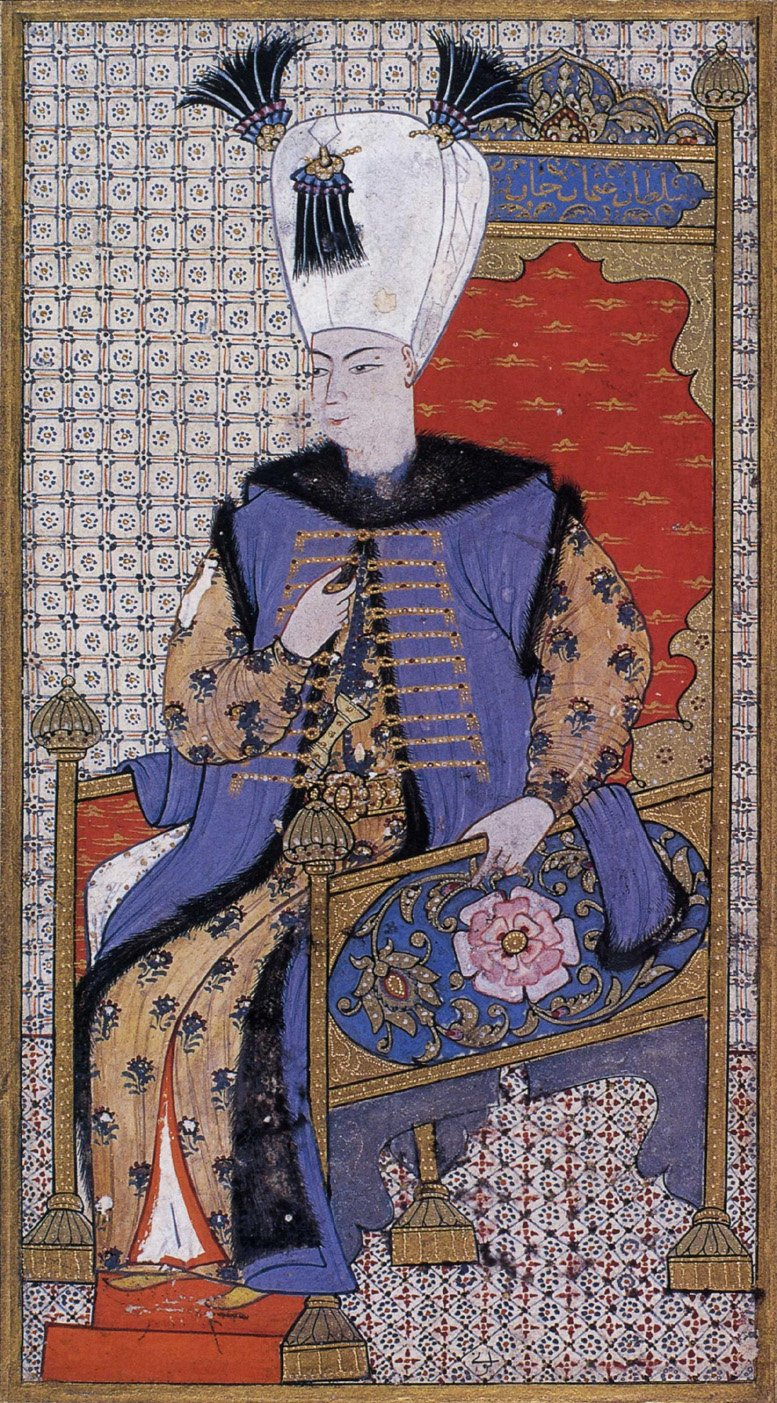
Portrait of Osman II by Abdulcelil Levni, early 18th century

=== Consorts ===
Osman II is traditionally identified as having had several consorts, although the identification and status of some of them remain disputed.

- Ayşe Sultan. She is traditionally identified as Osman II's Haseki Sultan, based on Paşmaklık Defteri from approximately 1619–1620, explicitly naming Haseki Ayşe Sultan from the Topkapı Sarayı Müzesi Arşivi. She is reported to have survived Osman and to have remain in Topkapi under Murad IV/Ibrahim I reigns as the unnamed Haseki of the late sultan Osman receiving the stipend of 1.000 Akçe, and/or died in the Old Palace after 1640.
- Kalender Sultan. Recent research by Fatih Yılmaz has identified Kalender Sultan as another consort of Osman II, based on archival and waqf records. An entry in the İSAM İstanbul Şer'iyye Sicilleri Vakfiyeler Kataloğu records a waqf established by Kalender Sultan bint Abdülmennân in 1077 AH (1656–57), providing documentary evidence for her existence under this name.
- Meylişah Hatun. Also known as Meleksima, Mehlikaya or Mehlika, she was one of Osman II's consorts and the mother of Şehzade Ömer. Some sources identify her as being of Russian origin, although her precise origin is uncertain.
- Fülane Hatun. An unnamed daughter of an astrologer and granddaughter of Pertev Mehmed Pasha, she is described in some sources as Osman II's first legal wife. Some authors have identified her with Ayşe Sultan, but this identification is uncertain. Their marriage took place on 7 February 1622.
- Rukiyye Akile Hatun. A daughter of Şeyhülislam Hocazade Esad Efendi, she was a free Muslim woman and became Osman II's legal wife in 1622. She is often identified as the mother of Osman's twins, Şehzade Mustafa and Zeynep Sultan.

=== Sons ===
Osman II had at least two sons:

- Şehzade Ömer (20 October 1621, Constantinople – 5 February 1622, Edirne. Buried with his father in the Blue Mosque) – with Meylişah Hatun. News of his birth reached his father in Edirne, while he was returning from the Polish Campaign. To celebrate the event, he invited the court to join him there, including the child with his mother, and organized a party that included a reenactment of his battles in Poland which Meylişah and Ömer witnessed, but during the re-enactment a stray bullet hit the infant killing him. Another version is that the baby died from the shock caused by the noise of the guns. Later, rumors also spread that the prince was deliberately killed.
- Şehzade Mustafa (November 1622, Constantinople – 1623, Constantinople. Buried with his father in the Blue Mosque) - maybe with Akile Hatun. Twin of Zeynep Sultan, born after the dethronement and killing of his father, his mother's identity is uncertain. Maybe he was killed by order of Halime Sultan, who acted as regent for her son and Osman's uncle, the new Sultan Mustafa I, while some others indicated he died of natural causes.

=== Daughters ===
Osman II had at least a daughter:

- Zeynep Sultan (November 1622, Constantinople – c. 1623, Constantinople. Buried with her father in the Blue Mosque) - maybe with Akile Hatun. Twin of Şehzade Mustafa, born after the dethronement and killing of her father, her mother's identity is uncertain. She died as newborn of unknown causes.

== In culture ==
Soon after the events, the Croatian Ragusan poet Ivan Gundulić wrote the epic poem Osman, in which he described the aftermath of the 1621 battle at Khotyn, the 1622 uprising, and Osman's execution.

In the 2015 Turkish television series Muhteşem Yüzyıl: Kösem, Osman II was portrayed by actor Taner Ölmez.

== See also ==
- Transformation of the Ottoman Empire
- Janissary revolts

== Bibliography ==
- Sakaoğlu, Necdet (2015). Bu Mülkün Sultanları. Alfa Yayıncılık. ISBN 978-6-051-71080-8.
- Dyer, Thomas Henry (1861). The History of Modern Europe. Vol. From the Fall of Constantinople, in 1453, to the War in the Crimea, in 1857. Volume 2. London: J. Murray.
- Çiçek, Fikri (2014). An examination of daily politics and factionalism at the Ottoman Imperial court in relation to the regicide of Osman II (r. 1618-22). Istanbul Şehir University.

Osman II House of Osman Born: November 3, 1604 Died: May 20, 1622
Regnal titles
Preceded by Mustafa I	Sultan of the Ottoman Empire; Feb 26, 1618 – May 20, 1622	Succeeded by Mustafa I
Sunni Islam titles
Preceded by Mustafa I	Caliph of the Ottoman Caliphate; Feb 26, 1618 – May 20, 1622	Succeeded by Mustafa I
