= Şehzade Ömer =

Ottoman prince (1621–1622)

- Born: 20 October 1621; Topkapı Palace, Istanbul, Ottoman Empire
- Died: 5 February 1622 (aged 3 months); Edirne Palace, Edirne, Ottoman Empire
- Dynasty: Ottoman
- Father: Osman II
- Mother: Meylişah Hatun
- Religion: Sunni Islam

Şehzade Ömer (Ottoman Turkish: شهزاده عمر; 20 October 1621 – 5 February 1622) was an Ottoman prince, the son of Sultan Osman II and his favorite Meylişah Hatun.

== Birth ==
Şehzade Ömer was born on 20 October 1621 in the Topkapı Palace, while Osman was waging war against Poland. His mother was the favorite consort Meylişah Hatun (also known as Meleksima, Mehlikaya or Mehlika Hatun), a Russian concubine. On Osman's way back he had received the news that a son had been born to him. Now as a father, he had a successor and posed a threat against his brothers. He called Meylişah to Edirne where the two met and Osman had a chance to see his son, Ömer. To celebrate the auspicious moment and possibly to impress her, he ordered a three-day festivity to be held, to celebrate his return from the campaign as well as the recent birth of his son.

== Death ==
In the celebrations, imitation of the battle scenes was a part of the show. Yet the unimaginable happened and the baby suddenly died on 5 February 1622, under most unexpected circumstances. According to the Venetian bailo, when Osman and Meleksima, together with their son and other female members of the dynasty, were watching a re-enactment of the sultan’s Polish campaign organized as a big show at the palace, one of the acemioğlans playing the role of a Polish soldier discharged his gun and caused a ricochet. His stray bullet hit and killed Prince Ömer instantly. Later, rumors also spread that the prince was deliberately killed.

This was a great trauma for Osman. He was not only devastated, but started to display a more brutal character. It is reported that, during first three days after he lost his son, the sultan did not speak a word and remained aloof from the public while contemplating in deep grief. He also blamed the death of Ömer on the child's mother, who fell into disgrace. Not wanting to see her again, Osman drove Meylişah out of the Palace and exiled her. Meylişah's life after that is unknown.

Some history writers explain this event by the shock the infant had due to noises of the fired cannons. Hammer gives a more striking reason for the baby's death: "To increase her joy festivities were held and some scenes of the Polish war were staged. The prince was present in these games and by the sudden shot from a rifle [by coincidence] he was wounded and died."

Upon this tragic loss, Osman frequently travelled incognito in the streets of the capital and punished many wrongdoers, including several Janissary officers and common people.

== Sources ==
- Çiçek, Fikri (2014). An examination of daily politics and factionalism at the Ottoman Imperial court in relation to the regicide of Osman II (r. 1618-22). Istanbul Şehir University.
