= Hoca Sadeddin Efendi =

Ottoman scholar

- Title: Shaykh al-Islām

Personal life
- Born: 1536/1537 Constantinople, Ottoman Empire (now Istanbul, Turkey)
- Died: October 2, 1599 Constantinople, Ottoman Empire
- Children: Mehmed Efendi, Esad Efendi, Mesud Efendi, Abdülaziz Efendi, Salih Efendi
- Notable work: Tâc üt-Tevârîh (Crown of Histories)
- Occupation: Islamic scholar, theologian, official, historian

Religious life
- Religion: Sunni Islam

Hoca Sadeddin Efendi (Ottoman Turkish: خواجه سعد الدین افندی; 1536/1537 – October 2, 1599) was an Ottoman Islamic scholar, theologian, official, and historian, a teacher of the future Ottoman sultan Murad III. His name may be transcribed variously, e.g. Sa'd ad-Din, Sa'd al-Din, Sa'düddin, or others. He was also called by the title of "Câmi'-ür Riyâseteyn".

When Murad became Sultan, Sadeddin became his advisor. Later he fell out of favor, but was appointed Shaykh al-Islām, a superior authority in the issues of Islam.

Sadeddin is the author of Tâc üt-Tevârîh (Tadj ut-Tewarikh, “Crown of Histories”), a history of the Ottoman Empire in prose and verse.

He had at least five sons: Mehmed Efendi (died 1615), Esad Efendi (died 1625), Mesud Efendi (died 1597), Abdülaziz Efendi (died 1618), and Salih Efendi.

== Publications ==
- Hoca Sadeddin Efendi, Tâcü't-tevârih. Sad. İsmet Parmaksızoğlu, vols. 1-5, Kültür Bakanlığı, Ankara, 1974-1979 reprint:1999. ("Sad". means Sadelestiren, "simplification")
  - Vol. 1: Osman Gazi, Orhan Gazi, Hüdevendigar Gazi ve Yıldırım Han Devirleri.
  - Vol. 2: Yıldırım Han'dan Fatih Sultan Mehmed'e.
  - Vol. 3: Fatih Sultan Mehmed ve İkinci Beyazid Dönemi.
  - Vol. 4: Şehzadelerin Girişimleri - Selimname ve Yavuz Sultan Selim Dönemi.
  - Vol. 5: Hatime. Orijinal karton kapaklarında.
- Saad ed-dini scriptoris turcici Annales turcici usque ad Muradem I cum textu turcico impressi. Translated to Latin, edited and annotated by Adam F. Kollár. Vienna: 1755.
- Bulgarian translation: Калицин, Мария. Корона на историите на Ходжа Садеддин. Transl. of Vol. 1. from Osman Turkish; analysis and commentary. Велико Търново (Veliko Tarnovo), Publ. "Абагар" ("Abagar"), 2000, 437 с, ISBN 954-427-427-8
