= Nurbanu Sultan =

Valide Sultan of the Ottoman Empire

- Valide Sultan
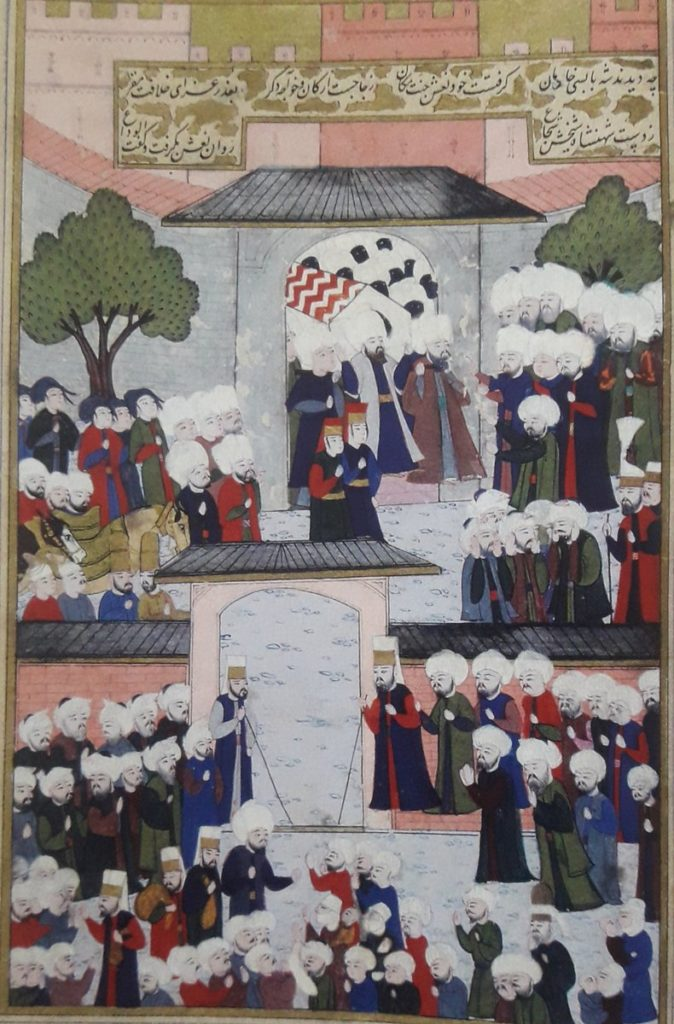
- Nurbanu's burial, one of 95 miniatures in Seyyid Lokman's Shahanshahnama, 1592 (TSM B200)

Valide Sultan of the Ottoman Empire
- Tenure: 15 December 1574 – 7 December 1583
- Predecessor: Hafsa Sultan
- Successor: Safiye Sultan

Haseki Sultan of the Ottoman Empire (Imperial Consort)
- Tenure: 7 September 1566 – 15 December 1574
- Predecessor: Hürrem Sultan
- Successor: Safiye Sultan
- Born: Cecilia Venier-Baffo or Kalē Kartanou or Rachel (?) c. 1525; Paros, Cyclades Islands, Ottoman Empire, or Corfu, Republic of Venice
- Died: 7 December 1583 (aged 57–58); Topkapı Palace, Constantinople, Ottoman Empire
- Burial: Hagia Sophia, Istanbul
- Spouse: Selim II (m. 1571; died 1574)
- Issue: Şah sultan; Gevherhan Sultan; Ismihan Sultan; Murad III; Kapıcıbaşı Mahmud (adopted)
Names
- Turkish: Nurbanu Sultan; Ottoman Turkish: نوربانو سلطان
- Dynasty: Ottoman (by marriage)
- Father: Nicolò Venier or Nikolaos Kartanos (?)
- Mother: Violante Baffo (?)
- Religion: Sunni Islam, previously Roman Catholicism or Judaism

Nurbanu Sultan (Ottoman Turkish: نور بانو سلطان; c. 1525 – 7 December 1583), also called Afife Nurbanu Sultan, was the Haseki Sultan and possibly legal wife of Ottoman sultan Selim II. As the mother of Murad III, she officially served as Valide Sultan from 1574 until her death in 1583. She was one of the most prominent figures during the Sultanate of Women.

== Theories about her origin ==
There are several theories about the ethnic origins of Nurbanu. It is claimed that she was of Venetian, Greek, or Jewish origin.

Although none of these theories has been definitively proven, the Venetian-origin theory is the best known, the most widely accepted, and the one that receives the greatest consensus among historians.

=== Cecilia Venier-Baffo ===
In 1900, Emilio Spagni claimed that she was a Venetian patrician, illegitimate daughter of Nicolò Venier and Violante Baffo, abducted on Paros when it was captured by Ottoman admiral Hayreddin Barbarossa in the Third Ottoman-Venetian War. The opinion that Nurbanu Sultan was Cecilia Venier-Baffo has been followed by Franz Babinger in his article about Nurbanu Sultan for Dizionario Biografico degli Italiani.

=== Kalē Kartanou ===
In 1992, historian Benjamin Arbel reassessed an older theory that Nurbanu was a Greek from Corfu named Kalē Kartanou, daughter of Nikolaos Kartanos and abducted from the island in 1537, judging it plausible if not absolutely proven. According to this theory, Venetian senators arbitrarily chose to create a new identity for her as Cecilia Venier-Baffo, and she adopted it for political and material gains. This theory has been accepted by Italian historian Maria Pia Pidani, and Turkish historian Emrah Safa Gürkan, among others. According to the latter historian, the fact that she "forge[d] a trans-imperial link in order to ingratiate herself with the Venetians suggests that the Ottomans, too, considered the common background as a diplomatic asset".

=== Jewish origin ===
Turkish historian Ahmet Refik believed she was of Jewish descent named Rachel, as did other Turkish historians.

== Early life ==
Nurbanu who was said to be prominent in the palace with her beauty and extraordinary intelligence, was sent to Manisa as one of the concubines of the harem of Şehzade Selim in 1543, and she bore him a son, Murad, who succeeded his father as the next Sultan of the Ottoman Empire, and one daughter.

== Haseki Sultan ==
Nurbanu became the most loved and favored consort of Şehzade Selim (who became Ottoman Sultan as Selim II in 1566) in Manisa, and the mother of his first son, Şehzade Murad (the future Murad III, born 1546). Although Selim was far from monogamous,Nurbanu persisted as a favorite for her great beauty and unusual intelligence, said by Peirce to have selected and tutored by Hürrem Sultan herself. Once he became sultan, Selim honoured his favorite consort, Nurbanu, with the title of Haseki Sultan and allowed her to stay at the Topkapı Palace throughout his reign, following the unprecedented example of his father, Suleiman the Magnificent. It is even alleged that he may have married her according to the Venetian ambassador who reported it, supposedly at the beginning of 1571, with the aim of recognising his greatly loved oldest son, Şehzâde Murad as his successor. Nurbanu’s prestige would come as the mother of Murad, a new twist to an old formula. It is fair to say that Nurbanu's career brought Hürrem's accomplishments into closer compatibility with the ingrained political habits of the Ottomans.

As the mother of the heir-apparent, she acted as an advisor to her husband, who valued her advice on various subjects because of his respect for her prudent judgment and intelligence. The Venetian ambassador Jacopo Soranzor reported, "The Haseki is said to be extremely well-loved and honored by His Majesty both for her great beauty and for being unusually intelligent." She became a formidable figure, with far-reaching influence during this time. According to some sources (mostly Venetian), her influence was such that Nurbanu Sultan effectively ran the government alongside the Grand Vizier, Sokollu Mehmed Pasha. Selim abrogated much of his power to Sokollu, who was said to have been the "virtual-emperor" as per a Ragusan ambassador in Rome. Nurbanu did not intervene directly in politics, but there is no doubt that she consulted regularly with her son-in-law Sokollu. The Ottoman Empire was far from stable at the top, and clashes over the imperial throne were common. It was also not unusual for the loser in such contests to be massacred along with his entire family to prevent any future challenges. Nurbanu Sultan was determined, however, that when the time came for her son to succeed his father, nothing would interfere.

When Selim II's reign ended in 1574, the haseki Nurbanu received 1,100 aspers a day, while Selim's other consorts, each the mother of a son, received only 40 aspers. In addition, Selim repeatedly, publicly stated that Murad was his heir, thus securing the position of his firstborn son and sentencing his other sons to death.

== Valide Sultan ==
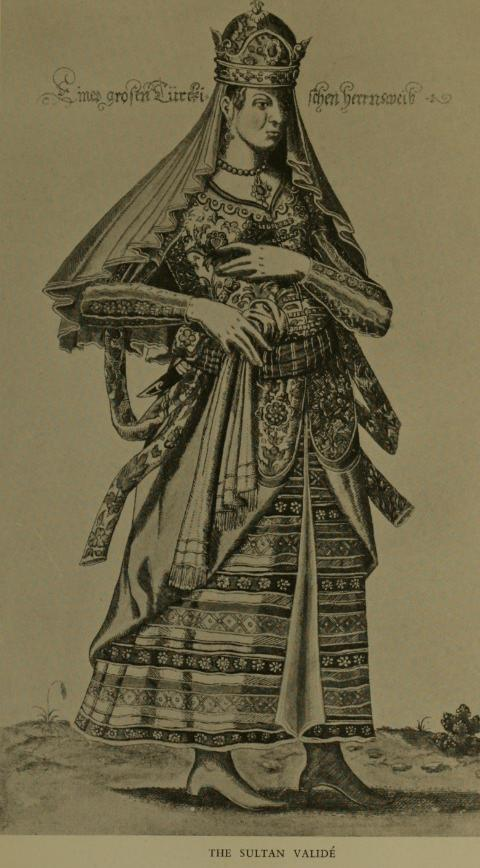
The Sultan Validé (Nurbanu Sultan) by Nicolas de Nicolay

Şehzade Murad had been sent to serve as Governor of Manisa on the Aegean coast and was there when Sultan Selim II died in 1574. Nurbanu first learned the news and then ordered everyone to keep their mouths shut. She did not share the sultan's death with anyone other than Sokollu Mehmed Pasha, the Grand Vizir. Her goal was to enable her son Murad to reach Istanbul in secret before anyone could take advantage of the situation. Security and privacy in the harem were the most strict anywhere, and no one else knew when Selim II had actually died. Nurbanu told no one, hid the dead body of her husband in an icebox, and sent word to Manisa for her son to come to Constantinople immediately. It was not made known publicly until twelve days later when Murad arrived and Nurbanu delivered up Selim's body. Her son became sultan and Nurbanu became valide sultan, the highest position a woman could hold in the Ottoman Empire.

Nurbanu's real influence began at this time. She enjoyed significant power from 1574 to 1583, although she apparently did not live in the palace after Selim II's death. Although in the past she also had influence over many things as haseki, she mostly just supported Selim from the background and gradually built up her own circle for the future. However, as valide, she immediately started to work and put her own trusted people in ever higher positions to strengthen herself and her son through them. She was revered as Valide-i Atik Sultan ("the first strong mother of the reigning sultan") during her son's reign until her death.

Nurbanu became the first woman to hold both the rank of haseki and valide. Although the Valide Sultan rank had existed since the reign of Bayezid II, it was Murad III who, for the sake of his mother, transformed it into a legally recogniseed position. This means that previously the Valide Sultan was only listed as "Mother of Sultan," in every list. But thanks to Murad, the mother of the sultan acquired a formal title, that of valide sultan. And with this change, not only did valide carry out the usual responsibilities according to tradition, but its tasks and possibilities also increased significantly.

Nurbanu did not seek to rule through her son, but merely helped him to become a just and worthy sultan, who was loved, accepted and respected by the people. In this way, valide became a high status and became an important and powerful position of the dynasty. Nurbanu's pocket money, which reached high amounts among both dynastic members and high-level officials, is considered as an indicator of this power. As valide sultan she was allocated 2000 coins daily.

Also because of her absolute and ultimate authority through her son, her favorites, Canfeda Hatun, Raziye Hatun, and Hubbi Hatun, trusted ladies-in-waiting to Murad and Nurbanu, also appear to have become very powerful and influential during his reign.

=== The rivalry with Safiye ===
Of all the sultans, Murad was the most devoted to his mother. However, Nurbanu's monopoly and superiority was still threatened.

Murad did not keep many consorts, and was committed to a single woman, Safiye. Safiye Sultan was given the rank of haseki as soon as Murad became sultan. Safiye herself wanted to have a say in state affairs, so she tried to influence Murad, which in turn provoked Nurbanu's dislike. Her attempts were in vain, as Murad never listened to any woman but his mother. The details of the struggle between Safiye and Nurbanu are not known, but they probably had conflicts within the harem, for in 1582 their hostility peaked.

To avoid the danger of dynastic extinction, it would have been logical for Safiye to gave birth to more children, but she had been unable to become pregnant for years at that time. In the cases where she had become pregnant, she had a miscarriage or the child was born premature and subsequently died. Murad, however, refused to accept new concubines due to the fact that he loved Safiye greatly — so much so that he was not able to have sex with anyone else. Nurbanu then devised a plan and accused Safiye of using black magic to make the sultan impotent. The rumor began to spread throughout the city, and Murad eventually exiled Safiye to the Old Palace due to his self-esteem. Doctors eventually solved Murad's impotence, who then had dozens of children in the following years.

Nurbanu may have felt that she had finally got rid of Safiye, but she could not win this fight so easily. Her grandson, Mehmed, openly disagreed with both her and the Sultan for the sake of his mother, Safiye. As a matter of fact, the sources clearly suggest that Nurbanu was afraid that Mehmed would anger Murad until Murad executed him. Although Nurbanu did not like Safiye, she loved Mehmed, as she did all her grandchildren. This is clearly indicated by a follow-up report from 1582. According to this, after Mehmed's circumcision, he impregnated one of Nurbanu's servants, which was forbidden, since the girl was a member of Murad's harem, not Mehmed's. Since Mehmed already had a very bad relationship with his father, Nurbanu killed the girl to hide the news from Murad. Murad seemingly never realised what had happened and was able to finally restore his relationship with Mehmed.

Nurbanu died suddenly in 1583, and less than two years later, in early 1585, Safiye regained her husband's trust and love. She and her exiled daughters returned to the royal harem. Thus Safiye regained enough power and influence, or far more than before, to protect her son and prepare for his reign. Safiye, like Nurbanu and her predecessor Hürrem Sultan, was able to build a circle of supporters and drive out the opposition. Even after Murad's death in January 1595, Safiye, like her late mother-in-law Nurbanu, hid the death of the Sultan until the arrival of her son to Constantinople.

=== Foreign politics ===
Her intermediary to the world outside the harem was her "Kira", Esther Handali. She corresponded with the French queen Catherine de' Medici.

It is understood that Nurbanu Sultan used Esther Handali, who was of Jewish origin, for her own personal affairs and had a financial relationship with the Duke of Naxos, Joseph Nasi. Perhaps due to this network of relationships, the rumour was spread that she was of Jewish origin. Among her close men were Bâbüssaâde Ağası Gazenfer Ağa, the priest Şemsi Pasha, and the strong figures of the harem who had been with her since Manisa, Canfeda Hatun and Raziye Hatun. Extensive information is available in the envoy reports about Nurbanu Sultan's close political diplomatic contact with the Venetians. In 1583, the Venetian Senate agreed to send her a gift worth 2,000 Venetian gold pieces for her services. According to another report, she prevented a possible Ottoman attack on Crete by Kapudan Pasha Uluç Ali and warned him to not declare war on Venice.

Venetian accounts are the most prolific in describing Nurbanu Sultan as a woman who never forgot her Venetian origins. Reportedly, she kept in contact with Venice through her lady-in-waiting Chirana, who kept in regular contact with the Council of Ten in Venice, which paid her an allowance as a Venetian agent.

=== Patroness of architecture ===
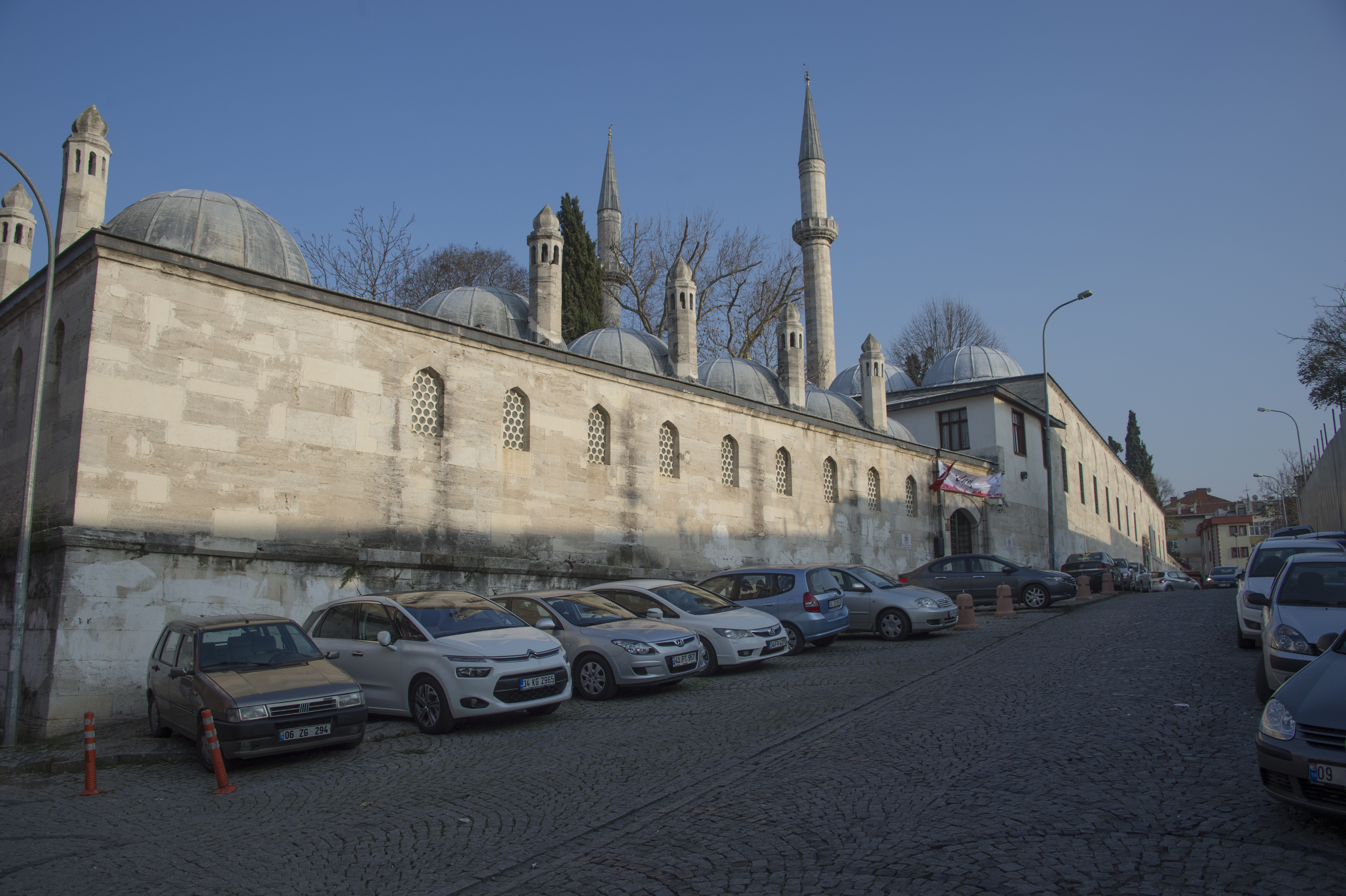
Atik Valide Mosque constructed by Nurbanu Sultan

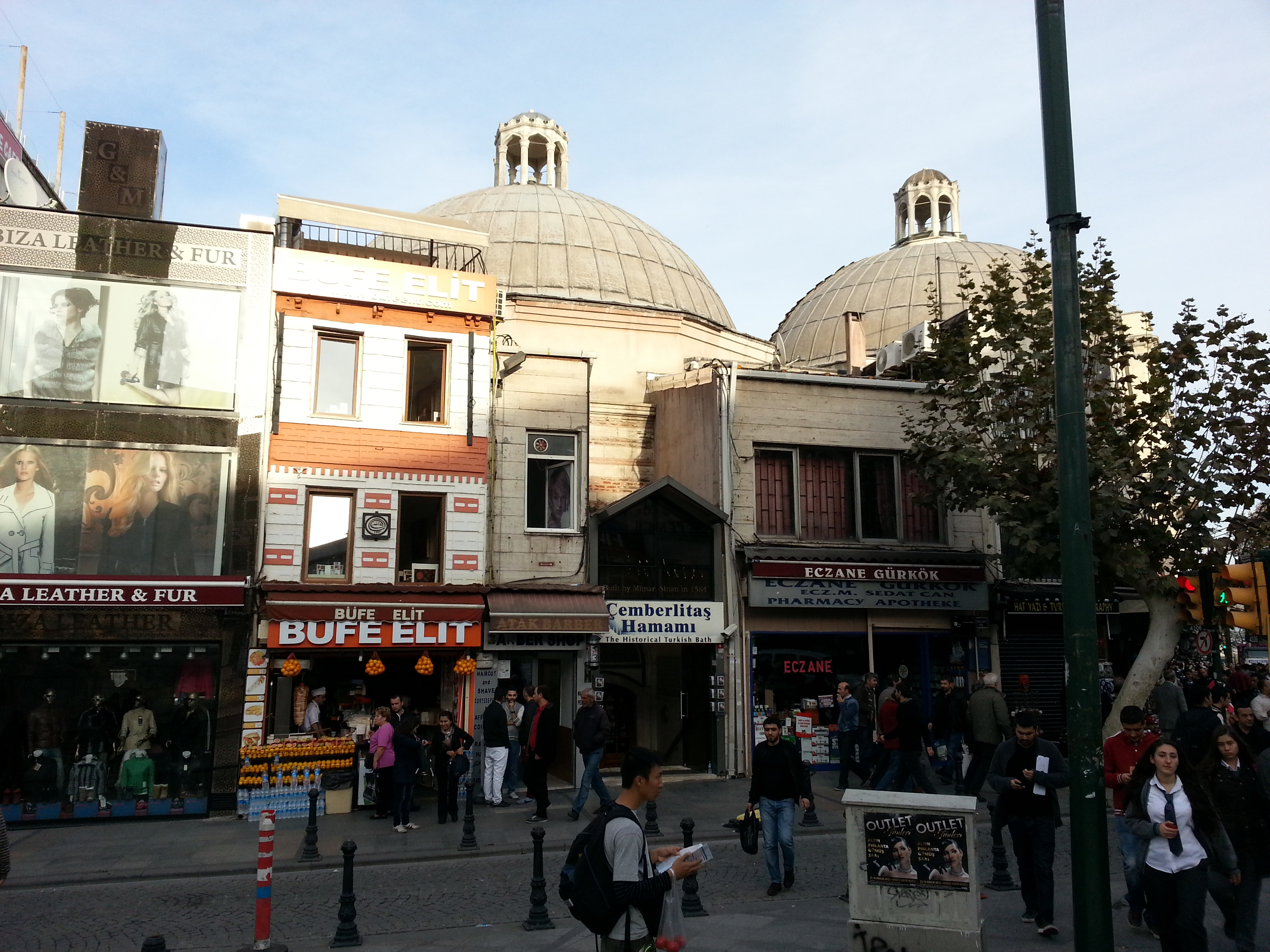
Entrance to Çemberlitaş Hamam, constructed on the orders of Nurbanu Sultan

This mosque complex was constructed by Mimar Sinan on a vast area. The component buildings in the complex were established on a number of successive and stepped flat levels. Buildings were constructed as the mosque, medresse, school, and the dervish lodge on two separate plains. To the west of these, on a lower flat level were erected the complex of buildings designed to meet social functions such as charity. The public bath is in the south.

The Darüşşifa is an integral part of the mosque complex constructed by Mimar Sinan, between 1570 and 1579. The landed properties that she devoted to the darüşşifa in her mosque complex are scattered over many corners of Istanbul, Rumelia, and Anatolia. Through the revenues remitted from these resources the treatments and needs of patients admitted to the darüşşifa were sponsored. The administration of revenues was also included in the complex.

During her nine years of her tenure as Valide Sultan, she ordered the renowned Ottoman architect Mimar Sinan to build the Atik Valide Mosque and its surrounding külliye at the district of Üsküdar in Istanbul, where previously a "Jewish bath" was located. The construction of the külliye was completed and put in commission at the end of 1583, just before her demise.

The Atik Valide Complex comprises a mosque, medrese, primary school, convent for mystics, schools for Qur’an recitation and hadith scholars, soup kitchen, hospital, and bathhouse. Mimar Sinan conceived of his major mosques as finely tuned instruments meant to sound the Qur’an as a text-as-event, in a reenactment of the original revelation. He even integrated sounding vessels in the domes to ensure a beautiful performance of the holy text. Based on the endowment deed (vakfiye), one can reconstruct the soundscape Nurbanu created through her patronage.

Nurbanu Sultan has also constructed imaret and bathhouse, which she built in Mercan, Alemdağ and Langa, in Istanbul, she was the first Ottoman woman to build a library in this complex. The stone needed during the construction of this mosque and complex was obtained from places close to Istanbul such as Iznik and Gallipoli, and wood from Sapanca and Iznik.

She was buried at the mausoleum of her husband Selim II, located inside the Hagia Sophia (then a mosque) at Sultanahmet in Istanbul, Turkey.

== Death ==
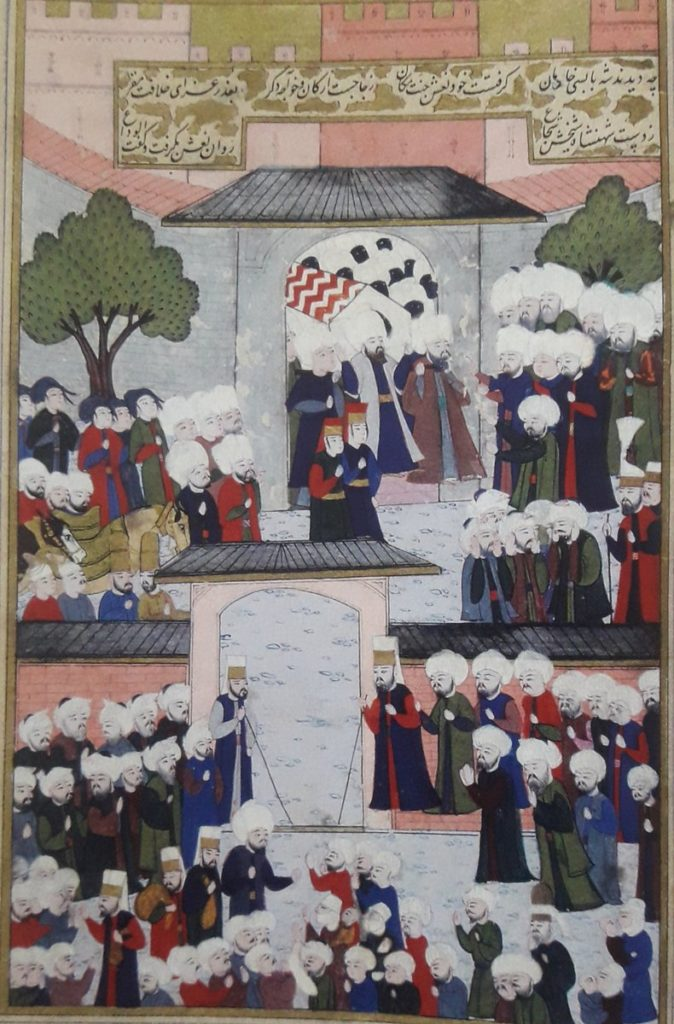
Nurbanu's burial, one of 95 miniatures in Seyyid Lokman's Shahanshahnama, 1592.

Nurbanu died in Constantinople on 7 December 1583, during the reign of her son Murad III. She was buried next to Selim II in his türbe (mausoleum) in the courtyard of Hagia Sophia.

Nurbanu Sultan attracted great respect not only during her life but also after her death. As against the norm that sultans remained in the palace during the funeral procession, Murad III accompanied his mother's corpse, both walking and crying, up to the Fatih mosque where her burial service was to be read. The farthest sultanic mosque from the imperial palace, i.e., the Fatih Mosque, was assigned for the funeral lrite. This choice not only enabled as many people as possible to give their blessing to the soul of Nurbanu Sultan but also maintained the extensive appreciation of this religious respect paid to her by the residents of the imperial capital.

Preceding Nurbanu's death, the Venetian ambassador in the Ottoman palace, Paolo Contarini had stated

"All goods and evils are coming from the mother queen."

When Nurbanu died in December 1583, the successor of Contarini reported the following:

"The death of this woman upset some according to their vested interests while contented others. The great authority she enjoyed with her son had gained many people important profits, while on the contrary had eliminated the hopes of some for realizing their wishes. Nevertheless, everybody admits in general that she was an excessively good, courageous and erudite woman."

== Issue ==
With Selim, Nurbanu had three daughters and one son:

- Şah Sultan (Karaman, c.1543 – Constantinople, 3 November 1580, buried in her own mausoleum, Eyüp). Married firstly in 1562 to Çakırcıbaşı Hasan Pasha, married secondly in 1574 to Zal Mahmud Pasha; Her mother was Nurbanu.
- Gevherhan Sultan (Manisa, 1544 – Constantinople, 1624, buried with her father in Hagia Sophia). Married firstly in 1562 to Piali Pasha, married secondly in 1579 to Cerrah Mehmed Pasha; Her mother was Nurbanu.
- Ismihan Sultan (1545, Manisa – 8 August 1585, buried in Selim II Mausoleum, Hagia Sophia Mosque), married firstly in 1562 to Sokollu Mehmed Pasha, married secondly in 1584 to Kalaylıkoz Ali Pasha.
- Murad III (4 July 1546, Manisa Palace, Manisa – 16 January 1595, Topkapı Palace, Constantinople, buried in Murad III Mausoleum, Hagia Sophia). 12th Sultan of the Ottoman Empire.

In addition to these children, Nurbanu had an adoptive son:

- Kapıcıbaşı Mahmud (fl. 1582 – 1584) was given to Nurbanu by Selim when he was still a child. Later, after Nurbanu’s death, he would marry a rich daughter of Ahmed Pasha.

It was earlier disputed whether she was also the mother of Fatma Sultan but considering that Nurbanu accompanied her son, Murad to his province to which he was appointed by his grandfather, Suleiman the Magnificent in 1558 and Fatma was born in 1559, Peirce had debunked this possibility. That Fatma was born with an unknown concubine is further proved by the provision made by her for her mother for 40 aspers, which was definitely not required by a woman paid 1,100 aspers by the end of Selim II's reign as haseki sultan and 2,000 aspers in her son, Murad III's reign as valide sultan and who had died in 1583, predating Fatma's will.

== In literature and popular culture ==
- A fictionalized version of the life and death of Nurbanu Sultan appeared in Marina Fiorato's the Venetian Contract, in which she was depicted as the niece of Doge Sebastiano Venier and the mother of Freya, who is the protagonist in the novel.
- Nurbanu Sultan is the protagonist in The Mapmaker's Daughter by Katherine Nouri Hughes, which takes the form of Nurbanu Sultan's memoirs.
- She was portrayed by Turkish actress Merve Boluğur in television series Muhteşem Yüzyıl.

== See also ==
- Ottoman dynasty
- Ottoman family tree
- List of Valide Sultans
- List of consorts of the Ottoman Sultans

Ottoman royalty
Preceded by Hürrem Sultan	Haseki Sultan; 7 September 1566 – 15 December 1574	Succeeded by Safiye Sultan
Preceded by Hafsa Sultan	Valide Sultan; 15 December 1574 – 7 December 1583	Succeeded by Safiye Sultan
