= Talikizade Suphi Çelebi =

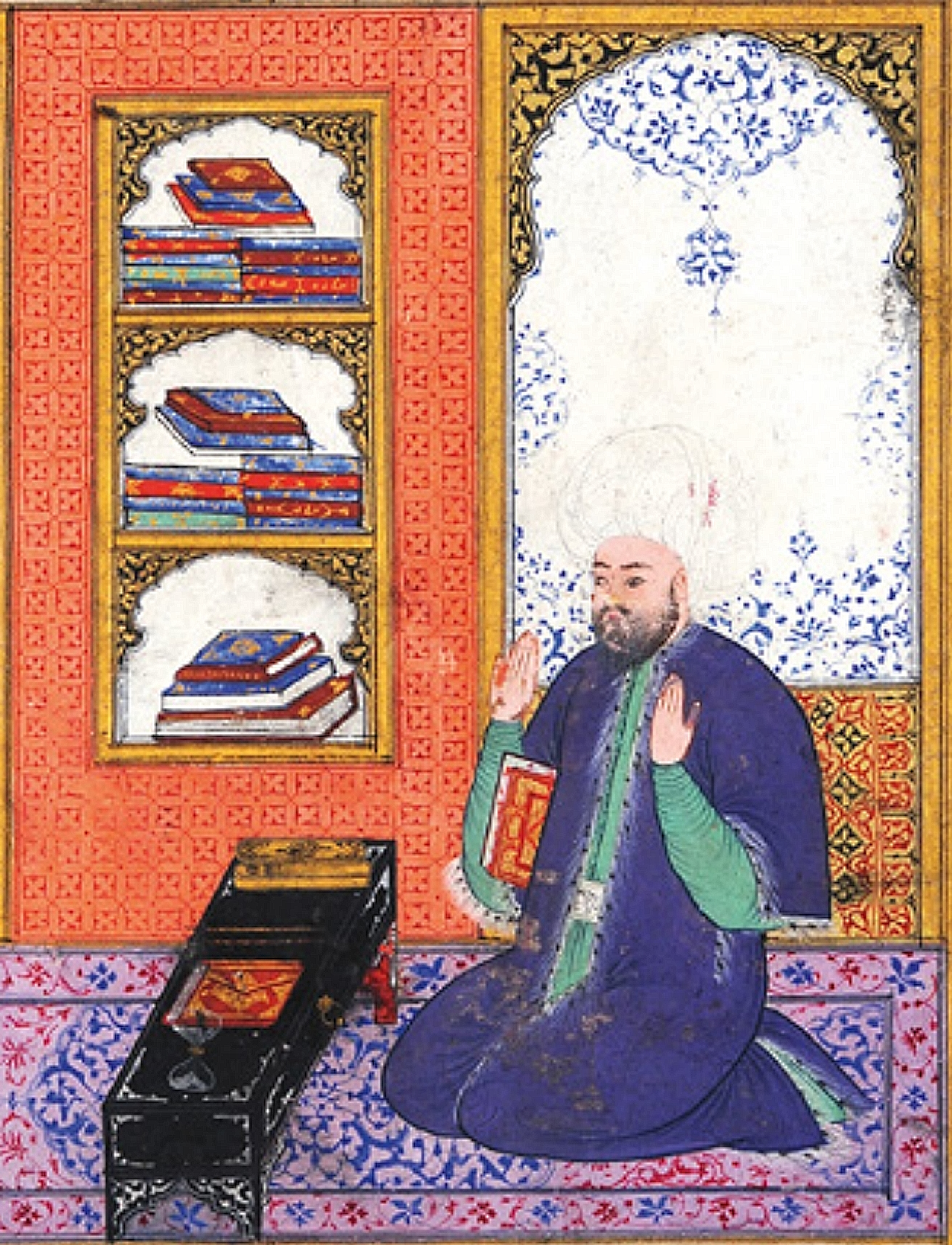
Talikizade (detail) in the Şehnāme-i humāyūn 1596 (Museum of Turkish and Islamic Arts, TIEM 1965, fol. 119b). Painted by Nakkaş Hasan

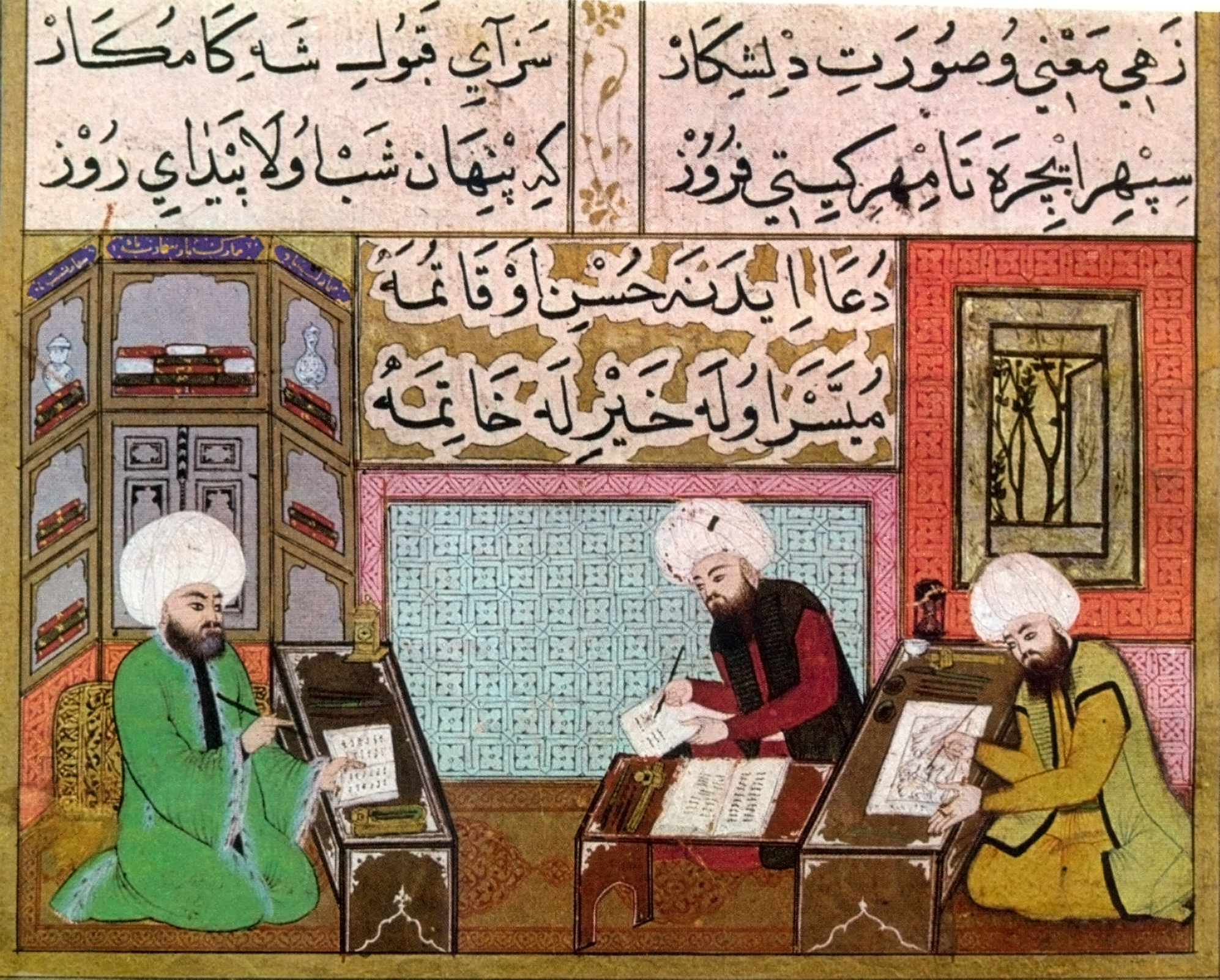
Talikizade, a scribe and Nakkaş Hasan, working on the Shahnameh. Şehnāme-i Mehmed Hän early 17th c. (Topkapı Palace Museum Library H 1609, fol. 74a).

Talikizade Suphi Çelebi, also Taliqizade Mehmed, was an Ottoman historian, scholar, and court official who lived in the late 16th century during the height of the Ottoman Empire. He was "the last official court historian to produce illustrated works". He is best known as a chronicler (historian) documenting events of his time. He was active during the reign of Murad III (r. 1574–1595).

== Early works ==
- Firа̄set-nа̄me (1574-1575), a study of physical characteristics and character
- Tebrῑziyye (1585) ;
- Gürdjistа̄n seferi (1585), an account of the Ottoman-Persia War

== As official court historian (şehnameci) ==
- Şemа̄'il-nа̄me-yi а̄l-i Osman (1593), a description of the characteristics of the Ottoman dynasty
- Şehnāme-i humāyūn ("Imperial Book of Kings") 1596, an account of the campaign of Sinan Pasha in Hungary, with three miniatures, including a depiction of the author
- Şehnāme-i Meḥmed Ḫān) (1598), an account of the campaign of Mehmed III in Hungary
