= Siege of Eger (1596) =

Ottoman siege of the Long Turkish War

Coordinates: 47.899°N 20.377°E

- Part of the Long Turkish War
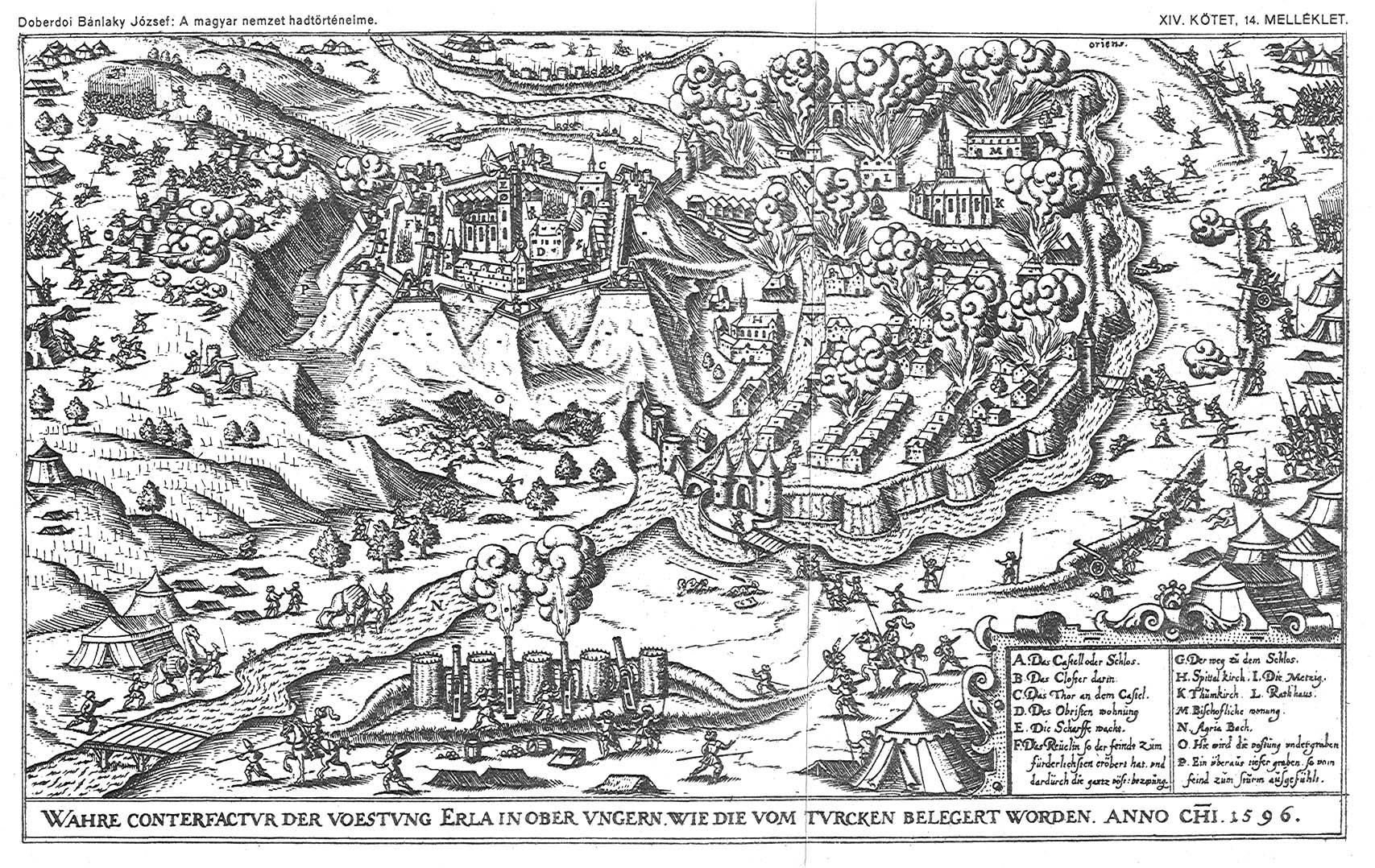
Date	September 20 – October 12, 1596
Location	Eger, Hungary
Result	Ottoman victory

Belligerents
Kingdom of Hungary	Ottoman Empire

Commanders and leaders
Pál Nyári	Mehmed III

Strength
7,000 men	15,000 men

Casualties and losses
Unknown	Unknown

The Ottomans laid siege to the city of Eger (Turkish: Eğri), that lasted from September 20 to October 12, 1596, as part of the Long War, successfully conquering it after the 7,000 defenders of the fortress, mostly foreign mercenaries, were killed by the Ottoman forces commanded by the Sultan Mehmed III himself, who had arrived with the main Ottoman Army from Constantinople.

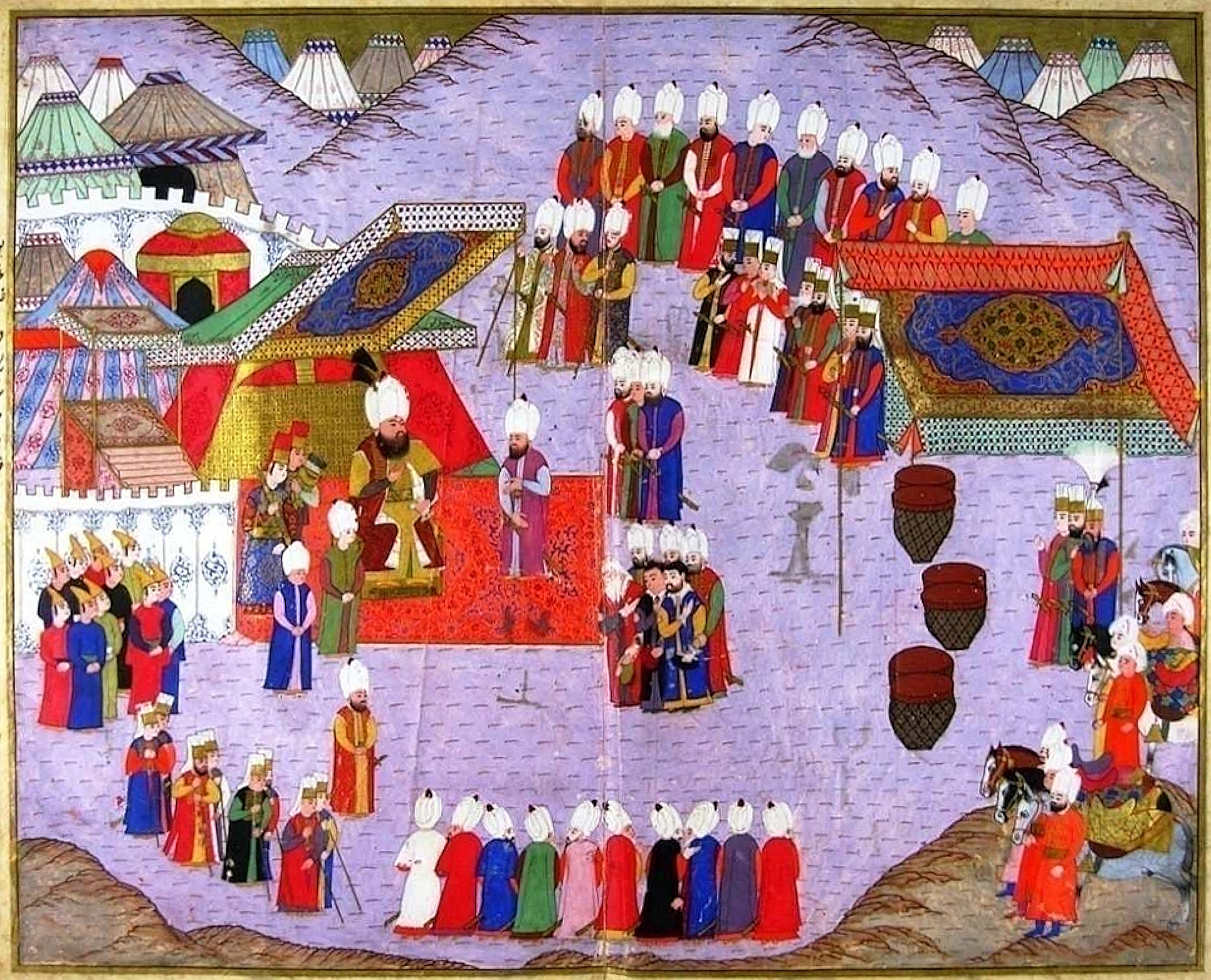
Sultan Mehmed III reception of the commanders of Eğri Castle. Eğri Fetihnamesi, 1598

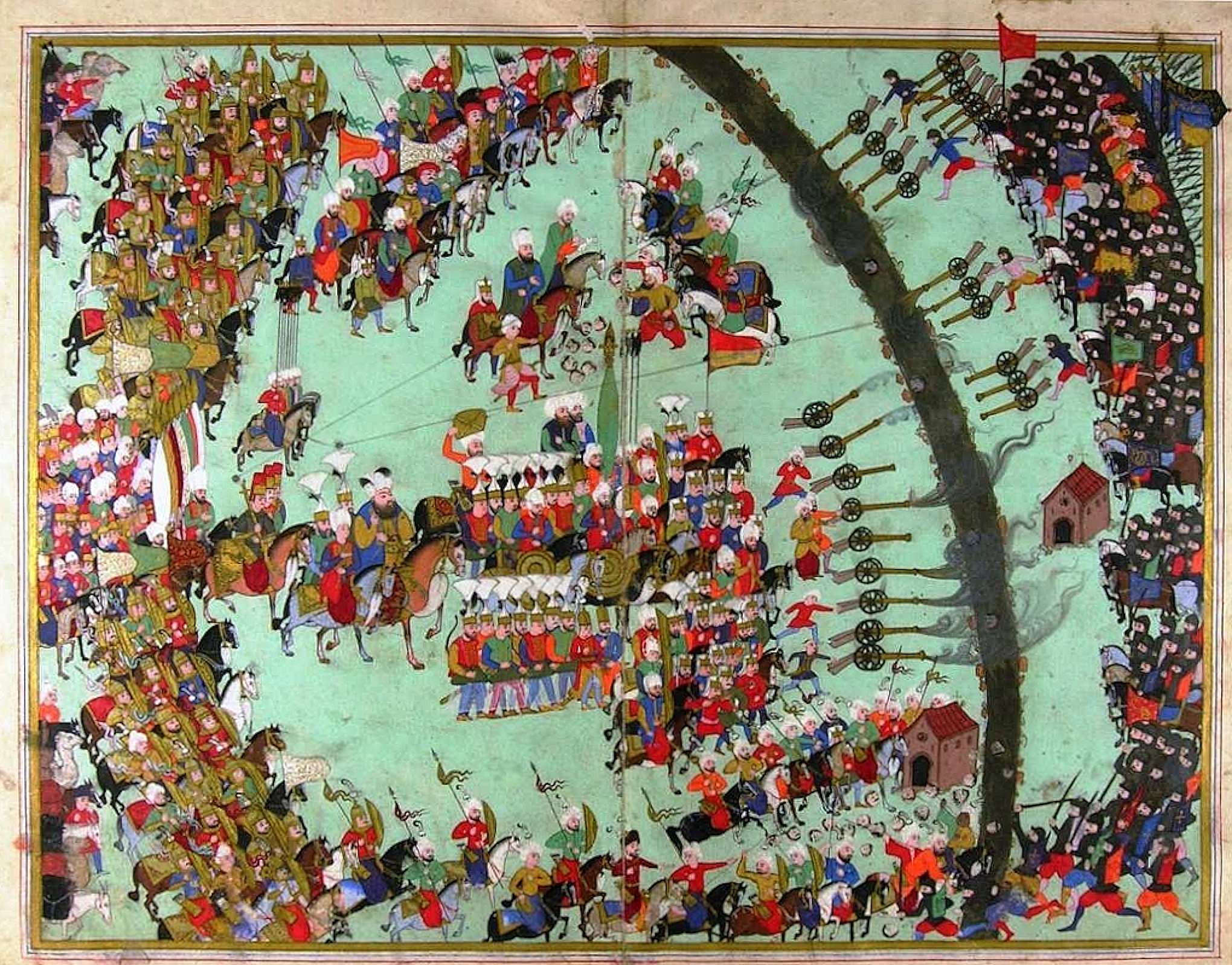
Mehmed III leading his troops at the Battle of Haçova (1596). Eğri Fetihnamesi

== See also ==
- Siege of Eger (1552)
