= Raziye Hatun =

Lady-in-waiting of Ottoman Sultan Murad III

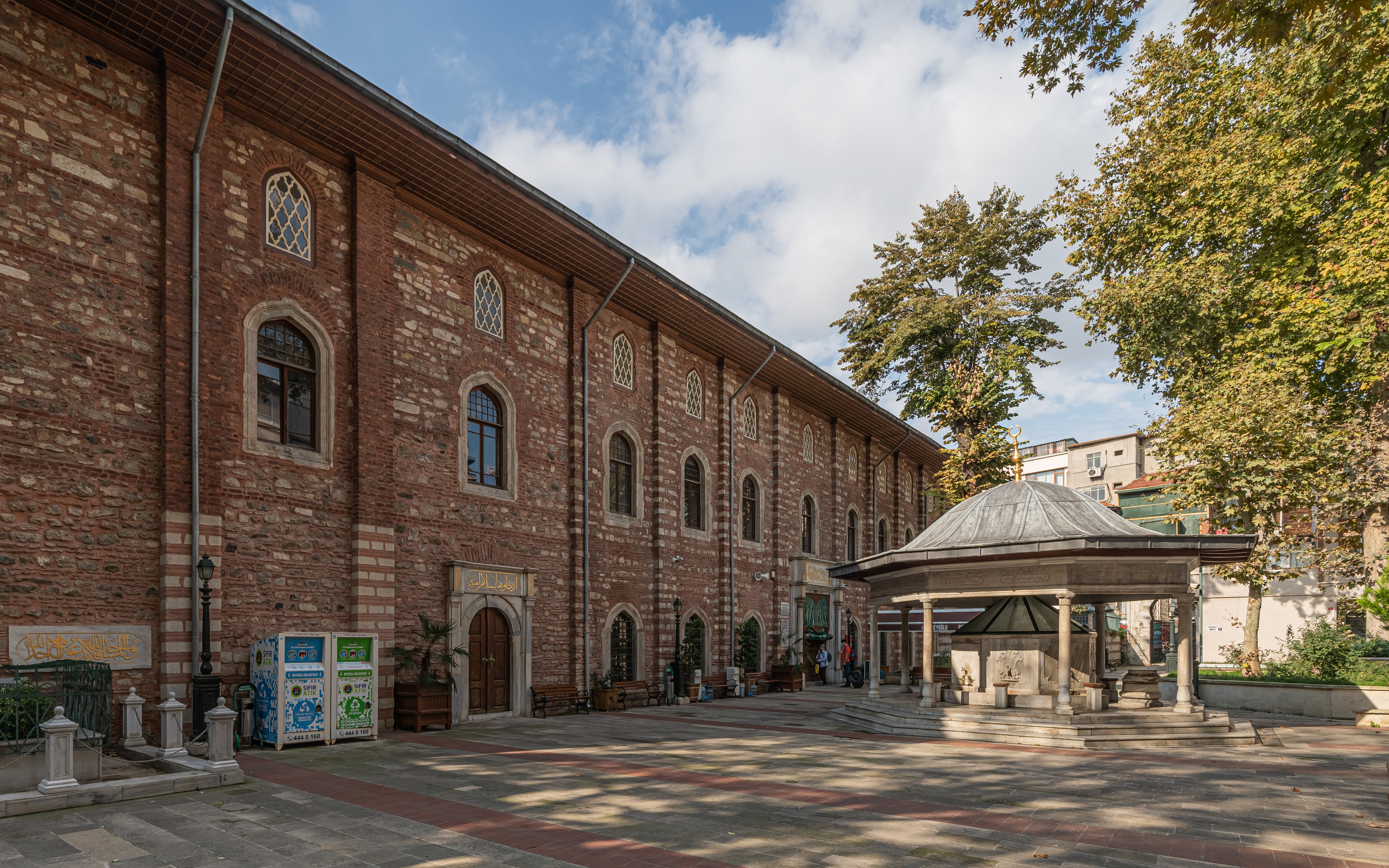
- Raziye Hatun is buried inside Arap Mosque in Istanbul.
- Died: 26 June 1597; Istanbul, Ottoman Empire
- Buried: Arap Mosque, Istanbul
- Spouses: Bekir Agha; Yahya Bey
- Issue: First marriage Mustafa Pasha; A son Two daughters

Ayşe Raziye Hatun (Ottoman Turkish: راضیه خاتون; "the living one" or "womanly" and "the accepting one" died 26 June 1597) was a lady-in-waiting to Sultan Murad III of the Ottoman Empire.

== Career ==
Raziye Hatun began her career as a lady-in-waiting (concubine) to Murad, when he was a prince (Şehzade) and the governor of Manisa. She gained his mother Nurbanu Sultan's favour in Manisa, where she had visited him.

She patronized a Şabaniye derviş of Albanian origin by the name of Şeyh Şüca as a skilled interpreter of dreams. He had been associated with the followers of Ümmi Sinan and had been a gardener at the court of Prince Murad. Upon Raziye's suggestion Murad also attached to him as one of his devotees.

When Murad ascended the throne in 1574, he appointed Raziye Hatun in charges of kalfa, and of the financial affairs (vekilharc) of the imperial harem. She, Canfeda Hatun, Kethüde (mistress housekeeper) of the Harem of Murad III, and the poetess Hubbi Hatun appear to have been very powerful and influential during his reign.

For a certain period Raziye was also protected by the mother of one of Sultan Mehmed III's sons, Şehzade Selim (died 1597); she had helped the young woman (Handan Sultan) with her relationship with the sultan and for this reason the prince's mother treated Raziye as her own parent.

== Personal life ==
Raziye's first husband was Bekir Agha. She had two sons, one named Mustafa Pasha, governor of Erzurum Eyalet, and the other had an important charge among the guard emirs in Egypt. She also had two daughters; one, described as "beautiful", who married Mehmed Efendi, also known as Muhyiddin, who became kadı of Bursa, of Istanbul and was then promoted kadıasker of Anatolia, he later became kadı of Egypt and kadıasker of Rumelia. The other married an agha who, with the help of his mother-in-law, immediately obtained an important office in Cairo.

Her second husband was Yahya, who took advantage of his wife's connection to the court. Yahya was favoured by the valide sultan Safiye Sultan, and was personally received by Sultan Mehmed III. Yahya was appointed judge of Mecca, and in 1597 chief justice of Asian and African provinces, and the same year chief justice of the European provinces, replacing Damad Mehmed Efendi.

During the period 1596-1604 Raziye's beautiful daughter was very important in the harem. She had the task of writing and reading letters for Safiye and the sultan enjoyed playing chess with her. She was dismissed only during the riots of March 1604 together with the most important persons of Safiye's party. Raziye and her daughter did not live in the imperial harem. Raziye possessed a palace of her own at Beşiktaş. She also had a kahya, a woman from Cyprus who had been enslaved when the Venetians lost the island.

== Death ==
Raziye Hatun died on 26 June 1597, and was buried in Arap Mosque, Istanbul.

== Sources ==
- Sakaoğlu, Necdet (2007). Famous Ottoman Women. Avea.
- Fleischer, Cornell H. (July 14, 2014). Bureaucrat and Intellectual in the Ottoman Empire: The Historian Mustafa Ali (1541-1600). Princeton University Press. ISBN 978-1-400-85421-9.
- Tezcan, Baki (September 13, 2013). The Second Ottoman Empire: Political and Social Transformation in the Early Modern World. Cambridge University Press. ISBN 978-0-521-51949-6.
- Fabris, Maria Pia Pedani; Bombaci, Alessio (2010). Inventory of the Lettere E Scritture Turchesche in the Venetian State Archives. BRILL. ISBN 978-9-004-17918-9.
- Imber, Colin; Kiyotaki, Keiko (February 5, 2005). Frontier of Ottoman Studies, Volume 1. I.B.Tauris. ISBN 978-1-850-43631-7.
- Ayvansaray-i, Hafiz Hueseyin (2000). The Garden of the Mosques: Hafiz Hüseyin Al-Ayvansarayî's Guide to the Muslim Monuments of Ottoman Istanbul. Brill. ISBN 978-9-004-11242-1.
- Petruccioli, Attilio (1997). Gardens in the Time of the Great Muslim Empires: Theory and Design. E. J. Brill. ISBN 978-9-004-10723-6.
- Pedani, Maria Pia (2000). Tucica, Volume 32: Safiye's Household and Venetian Diplomacy.
