= Eğri Fetihnamesi =

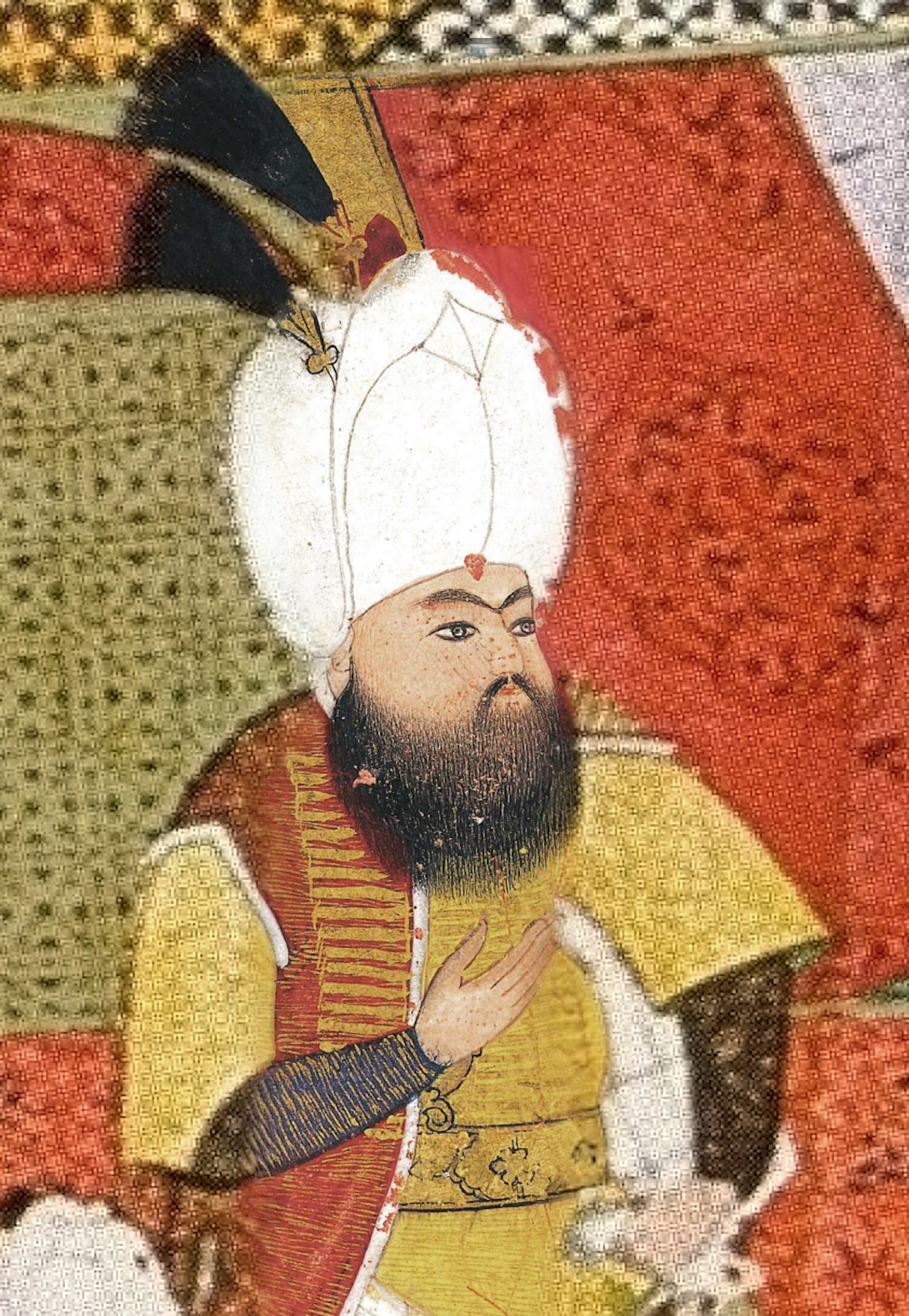
Contemporary portrait of Sultan Mehmed III receiving the surrender of the Siege of Eger (1596). Eğri Fetihnamesi, 1598 (TSMK, H.1609)

Eğri Fetihnamesi ("The Book of Conquest of Eğri"), also Şehnāme-i Meḥmed Ḫān ("The Book of Kings of Mehmed Khan", Topkapı Palace Library, TSMK H.1609) is a manuscript from Ottoman Turkey, written in 1598 by Talikizade Suphi Çelebi, author of the Shahnameh. The illustrations made by Nakkaş Hasan. The manuscript relates the events of the Siege of Eger (1596) led by Sultan Mehmed III.

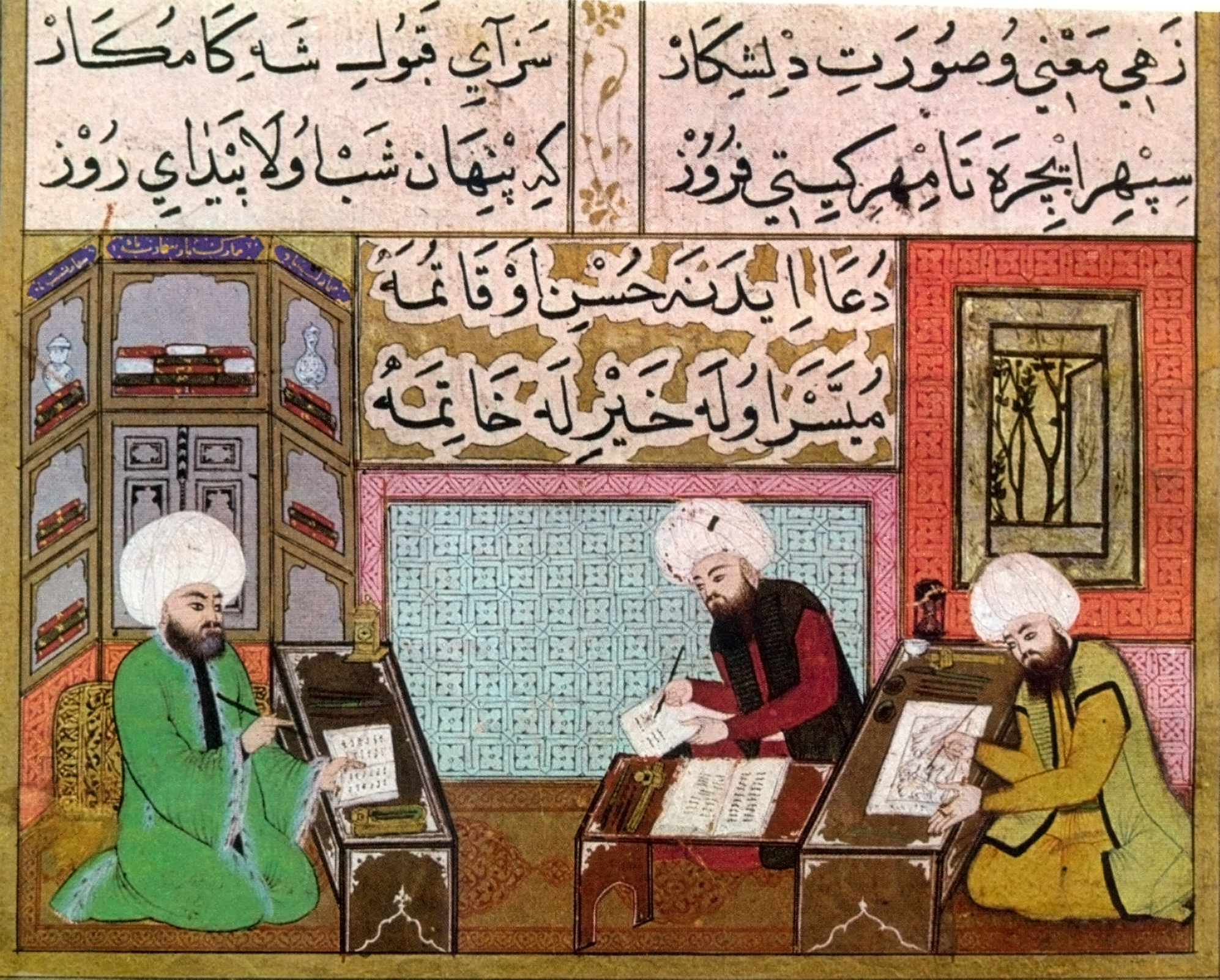
Artists of the Eğri Fetihnamesi, with the painter Nakkaş Hasan (right)

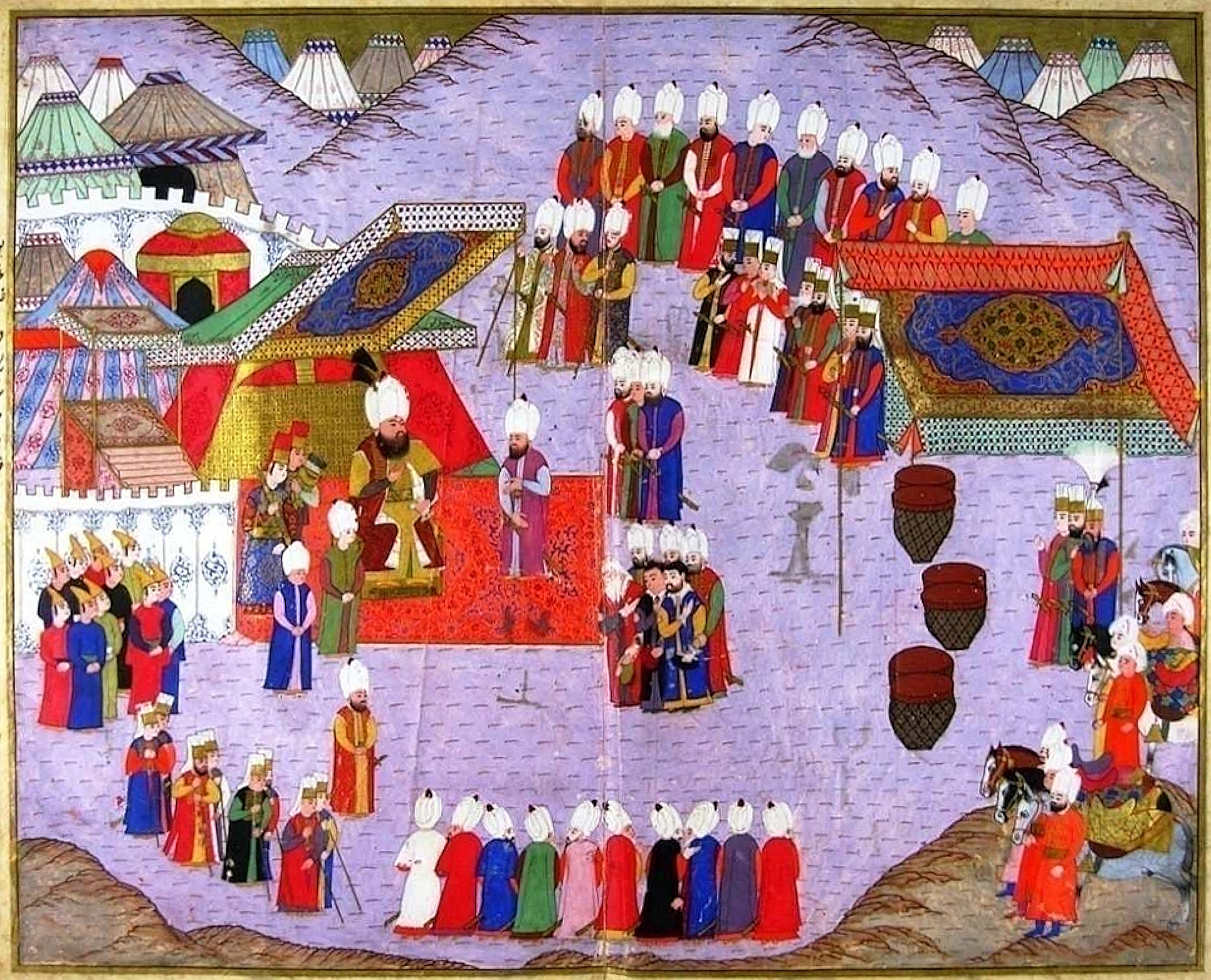
Sultan Mehmed III reception of the commanders of Eğri Castle.

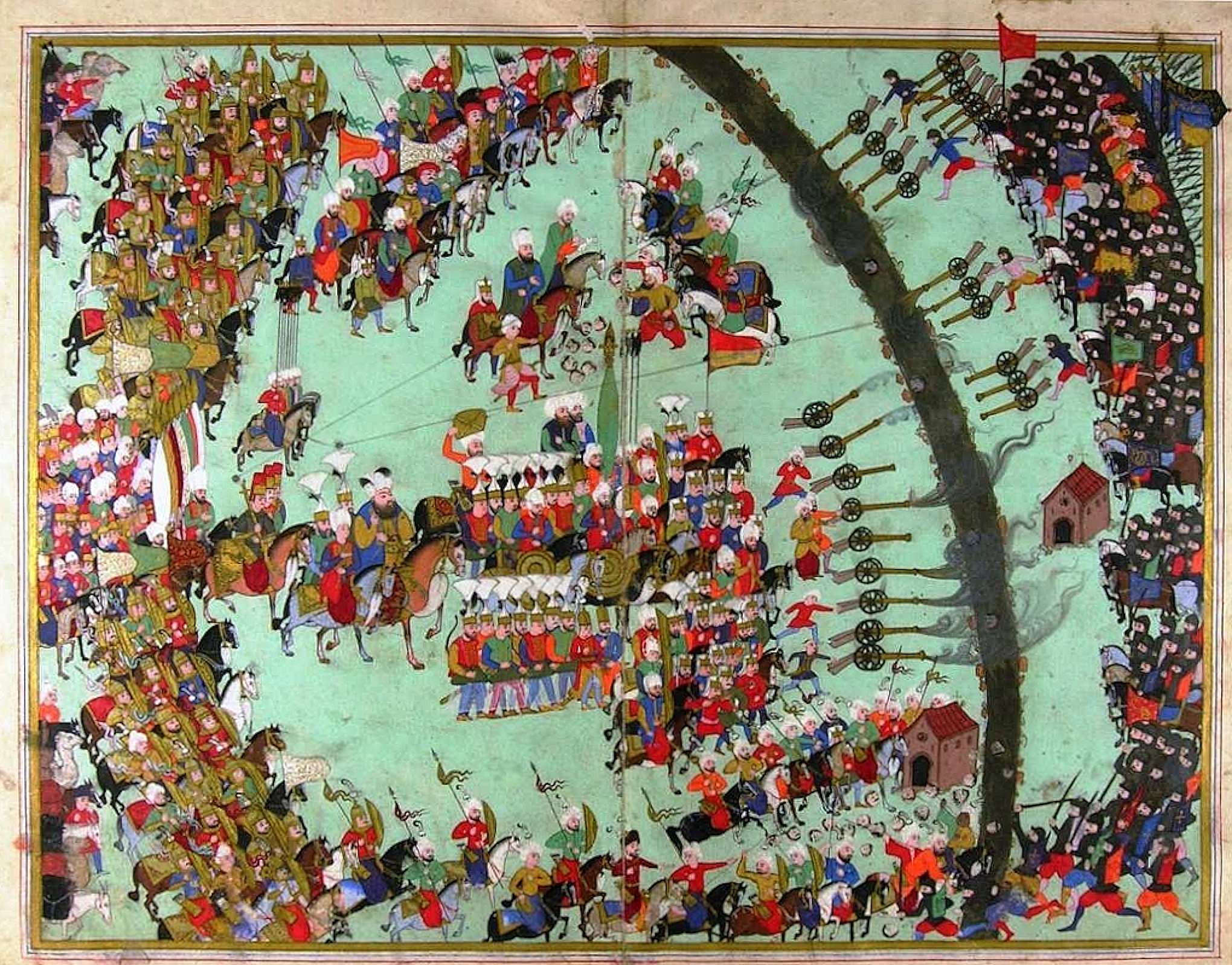
Mehmed III leading his troops at the Battle of Haçova (1596)

== Sources ==
- LİSANS TEZİ, YÜKSEK (2013). EĞRİ FETİHNAMESİ BEZEME UNSURLARI VE MİNYATÜRLERİ (thesis) (PDF). SAKARYA ÜNİVERSİTESİ.
