= Canfeda Hatun =

Hostess of Ottoman Sultan Murad III's harem

- Full name: Turkish: Saliha Canfeda Hatun; Ottoman Turkish: صالحہ جان فدا خاتون
- Died: c. 1600; Constantinople, Ottoman Empire (present day Istanbul, Turkey)

Saliha Canfeda Hatun (Ottoman Turkish: صالحہ جان فدا خاتون; "the devoted one" and "soul"; died c. 1600) was a lady-in-waiting to Nurbanu Sultan and her son Sultan Murad III of the Ottoman Empire.

== Career ==
Canfeda Hatun was an ally of Nurbanu Sultan, who had brought her from the Old Palace. She was appointed the mistress housekeeper of the Imperial Harem (kedbanu-yi harem, Kethüde Hatun, Kahya Kadın), and under Nurbanu she was responsible for training the women of the imperial harem. She had also been an ally of Ghazanfer Agha, the Agha of the imperial harem and of Grand Vizier Sokollu Mehmed Pasha's rival Lala Mustafa Pasha. On her deathbed, in 1583, Nurbanu insisted, in front of her daughter-in-law Safiye Sultan and her son, that Canfeda be kept in the royal harem. And so after her death, Canfeda took control of the imperial harem.

Canfeda, along with mistress of financial affairs Raziye Hatun, the poet Hubbi Hatun, and other musahibes (favourites) of Murad III, appears to have been very influential during the latter's reign. She managed to win the trust of her former adversary, and even increased her influence in palace affairs under her protection. As a clever ploy, Canfeda used her proximity to the dynasty women to receive bribes and expensive gifts. She gathered extraordinary wealth and this earned her the animosity of part of the high administration and the commandant of the janissary corps. In 1593, during one of the janissary mutinies caused by a delay in the payment of the salaries, the discontented soldiers demanded the heads of the Grand Vizier, the head Defterdar, and the loathsome Canfeda. Only with great efforts did Murad manage to calm the mutineers and save the lives of his associates.

== Charities ==
Canfeda dedicated part of her huge wealth to her charitable foundation, whose revenues were used for the construction and maintenance of a mosque and a fountain in the imperial capital of Istanbul. In 1584, the estimated cost would have been two million espers. The mosque was built in the neighborhood of Sarachne near the customs office, with a primary school, a public drinking fountain and water pump. In 1593, Canfeda also built another mosque and a public bath in a village in the Beykoz village of Akbaba. She also received permission from the Sultan to repair and enlarge a water transport system originally constructed by the Sultan Bayezid II in order to bring water to her Istanbul mosque and the nearby bath built by Gedik Ahmed Pasha. In retirement, Canfeda's stipend was 100 aspers a day, but when this amount proved to be insufficient for the public works she wished to undertake, it was doubled. Her mosques were built after Nurbanu's death suggesting her high status.

== Personal life ==
Canfeda Hatun was of Circassian origin. She had two brothers, Mahmud Pasha, who was beylerbeyi of Haleb in 1594, and Divane Ibrahim Pasha. whom she always protected. The siblings arrived in Constantinople as slaves of the Crimean slave trade. When Canfeda lost her power her two brothers died.

A garden in Fındıklı belonged to Canfeda.

== Last years and death ==
After Murad's death in 1595, Canfeda and the rest of Murad's harem were sent to the Old Palace. She had been dismissed from her position by the new sultan Mehmed III, after which she frequently contacted the Venetians in order to obtain commodities for the harem. She was not in favour with the new sultan since she had chosen to protect the second son of Sultan Murad, Prince Mustafa, who was killed with his eighteen brothers on the eve of Mehmed's accession to the throne. She died in 1600.

== In popular culture ==
In the 2011-2014 TV series Muhteşem Yüzyıl, Canfeda Hatun is portrayed by the Turkish actress Kübra Kip.

== Sources ==
- Fetvacı, Emine (2013). Picturing History at the Ottoman Court. Indiana University Press. ISBN 978-0-253-00678-3.
- Fleischer, Cornell H. (2014). Bureaucrat and Intellectual in the Ottoman Empire: The Historian Mustafa Ali (1541-1600). Princeton University Press. ISBN 978-1-400-85421-9.
- Gövsa, İbrahim Alâettin (1945). Türk meşhurları ansiklopedisi: edebiyatta, sanatta, ilimde, harpte, politika ürk meşhurları ansiklopedisi: edebiyatta, sanatta, ilimde, harpte, politikada ve her sahada şöhret kazanmış olan Türklerin hayatları eserleri. Yedigün.
- Narodna biblioteka "Sv. sv. Kiril i Metodiĭ. Orientalski otdel, International Centre for Minority Studies and Intercultural Relations, Research Centre for Islamic History, Art, and Culture (2003). Inventory of Ottoman Turkish documents about Waqf preserved in the Oriental Department at the St. St. Cyril and Methodius National Library:Registers. Narodna biblioteka "Sv. sv. Kiril i Metodiĭ.
- Pedani, Maria Pia (2000). Tucica, Volume 32: Safiye's Household and Venetian Diplomacy.
- Pedani Fabris, Maria Pia; Bombaci, Alessio (2010). Inventory of the Lettere E Scritture Turchesche in the Venetian State Archives. BRILL. ISBN 978-9-004-17918-9.
- Peirce, Leslie P. (1993). The Imperial Harem: Women and Sovereignty in the Ottoman Empire. Oxford University Press. ISBN 978-0-195-08677-5.
- Petruccioli, Attilio (1997). Gardens in the Time of the Great Muslim Empires: Theory and Design. E. J. Brill. ISBN 978-9-004-10723-6.
- Tezcan, Baki (2010). The Second Ottoman Empire: Political and Social Transformation in the Early Modern World. Cambridge University Press. ISBN 978-0-521-51949-6.
- Thys-Şenocak, Lucienne (2006). Ottoman Women Builders: The Architectural Patronage of Hadice Turhan Sultan. Ashgate. ISBN 978-0-754-63310-5.
