= Nakkaş Hasan =

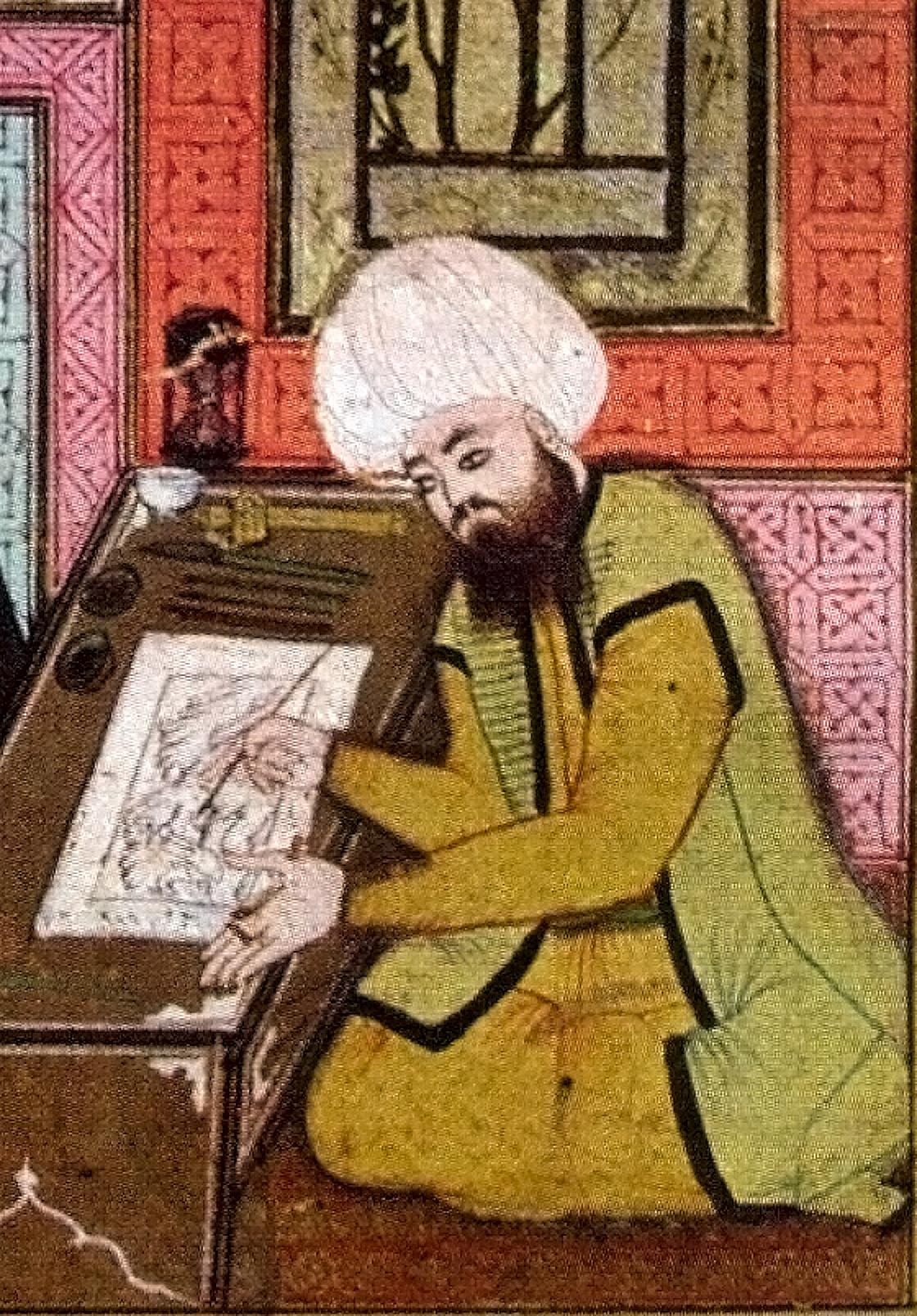
Nakkaş Hasan drawing a hunting figure (detail). Şehnāme-i Meḥmed Ḫān, 1598 (TSMK, H.1609)

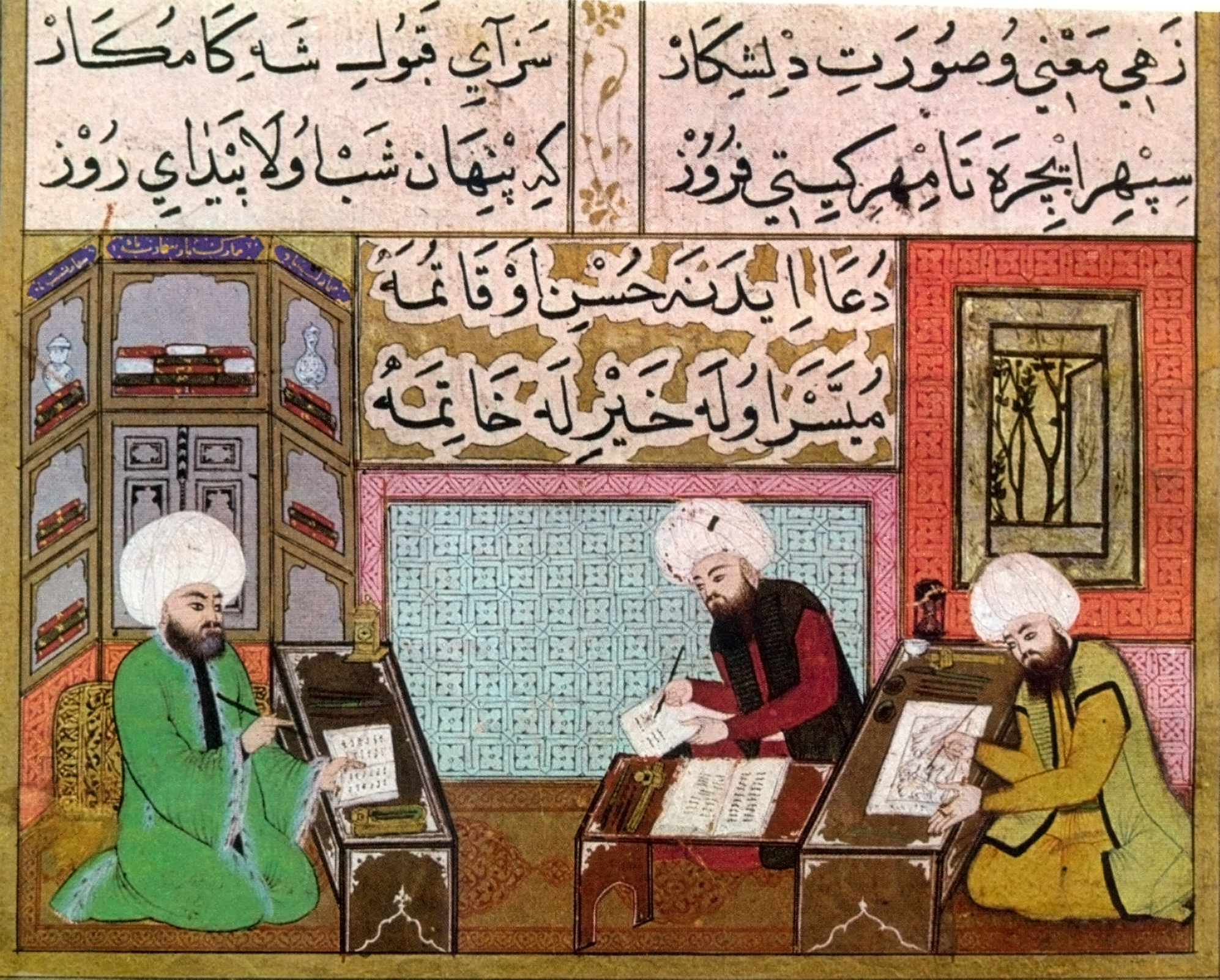
Talikizade, a scribe and Nakkaş Hasan, working on the Shahnameh. Şehnāme-i Mehmed Hän early 17th c. (Topkapı Palace Museum Library H 1609, fol. 74a).

Nakkaş Hasan (died 1622; "Hasan the painter") was a miniaturist at the Ottoman court towards the end of the 16th century. He worked for the historian Talikizade Suphi Çelebi, and created many miniatures for him. He was active during the reign of Murad III (r. 1574–1595). In 1605, he married Hümaşah Sultan, daughter of Murad III and Safiye Sultan. He is not to be confused with the earlier Nakkaş Osman.

Nakkaş Osman was not a regular painter, but more an insider at the Ottoman court. He was eventually appointed to the high rank of vizier of the Empire.

Nakkaş Hasan created miniatures for the following works:

- Şemа̄'il-nа̄me-yi а̄l-i Osman (1593), a description of the characteristics of the Ottoman dynasty
- Şehnāme-i humāyūn ("Imperial Book of Kings") 1596, an account of the campaign of Sinan Pasha in Hungary, with three miniatures, including a depiction of the author
- Şehnāme-i Meḥmed Ḫān (1598), an account of the campaign of Mehmed III in Hungary
