= Murad III =

Sultan of the Ottoman Empire from 1574 to 1595

- Custodian of the Two Holy Mosques
- Contemporary Ottoman portrait of Murad III by Seyyid Lokman, 1583. Turkish and Islamic Arts Museum

Sultan of the Ottoman Empire (Padishah)
- Reign: 27 December 1574 – 16 January 1595
- Predecessor: Selim II
- Successor: Mehmed III

Ottoman caliph (Amir al-Mu'minin)
- Predecessor: Selim II
- Successor: Mehmed III
- Born: 4 July 1546; Manisa, Ottoman Empire
- Died: 16 January 1595 (aged 48); Topkapı Palace, Constantinople, Ottoman Empire
- Burial: Hagia Sophia, Istanbul
- Consorts: Safiye Sultan; Others
- Issue Among others: Hümaşah Sultan; Ayşe Sultan; Mehmed III; Fatma Sultan; Mihrimah Sultan; Fahriye Sultan
Names
- Murad bin Selim
- Dynasty: Ottoman
- Father: Selim II
- Mother: Nurbanu Sultan
- Religion: Sunni Islam
- Tughra

Murad III (Ottoman Turkish: مراد ثالث, romanized: Murād-i sālis; Turkish: III. Murad; 4 July 1546 – 16 January 1595) was the sultan of the Ottoman Empire from 1574 until his death in 1595.

His rule saw battles with the Habsburgs and exhausting wars with the Safavids. The long-independent Morocco was for a time made a vassal of the empire but regained independence in 1582. His reign saw the empire's expanding influence on the eastern coast of Africa. However, the empire was beset by increasing corruption and inflation from the New World which led to unrest among the Janissary and commoners. Relations with Elizabethan England were cemented during his reign, as both had a common enemy in the Spanish Empire. He was also a great patron of the arts, commissioning the Siyer-i-Nebi and other illustrated manuscripts.

== Early life ==
Murad was born in Manisa on 4 July 1546 to Şehzade Selim and his powerful consort, Nurbanu Sultan. He was the grandson of Sultan Suleiman the Magnificent and his wife, Haseki Hürrem Sultan.

Murad received a comprehensive education and learned both Arabic and Persian. Following his ceremonial circumcision in 1557, Suleiman I, appointed him sancakbeyi (governor) of Akşehir in 1558. The same year, his grandmother, Hürrem Sultan, died when he was almost 12 years old. In 1564, at the age of 18, Murad was appointed sancakbeyi of Saruhan, with Manisa as his seat.

Murad's grandfather, Suleiman I, died in 1566 when Murad was 20 years old, and his father, Selim, succeeded to the throne as Sultan Selim II. Murad remained in Manisa throughout his father's reign, continuing his education under the tutelage of the renowned historian and scholar Hoca Sadeddin Efendi.

Contemporary accounts described Murad during his years in Manisa as a highly educated, talented, and deeply religious prince who was greatly beloved by his father.

== Reign ==
Murad succeeded his father Sultan Selim II upon his death in December 1574 as Sultan Murad III. At the beginning of his reign, Murad ordered the execution of his five younger brothers, having them strangled in accordance with the Ottoman practice of dynastic fratricide.

Murad's authority was increasingly influenced by the imperial harem, particularly by his mother, Nurbanu Sultan, and later by his favorite consort, Safiye Sultan. Their influence over the sultan and the court often came at the expense of political influence of the Grand Vizier of the Ottoman Empire Sokollu Mehmed Pasha. Sokollu had played a crucial role in maintaining the stability and power of the Ottoman government during the reign of Selim II and continued to serve as Grand Vizier under Murad III until assassination in October 1579.

Murad's reign was marked by prolonged and costly wars on both the western and eastern fronts of the empire. Along the northern frontier, Ottoman forces defended their territories against the Habsburg monarchy, with the Bosnian governor Hasan Predojević playing an important role in fighting. The empire also suffered several military setbacks, most notably the defeat at the Battle of Sisak in June 1593.

=== Expedition to Morocco ===
During his exile, Abd al-Malik became a trusted member of the Ottoman establishment. He proposed making Morocco an Ottoman vassal in exchange for the support of Sultan Murad III in helping him reclaim the Saadi throne.

In 1576, Abd al-Malik and Ramazan Pasha departed from Algiers with an army of approximately 10,000 men, most of them Ottoman Turks, to restore Abd al-Malik to the Moroccan throne. Ramazan Pashas forces captured Fez, forcing the reigning Saadi Sultan to flee to Marrakesh. The Ottoman-backed army subsequently captured Marrakesh as well, and Abd al-Malik was installed as Sultan of Marocco as an Ottoman client ruler

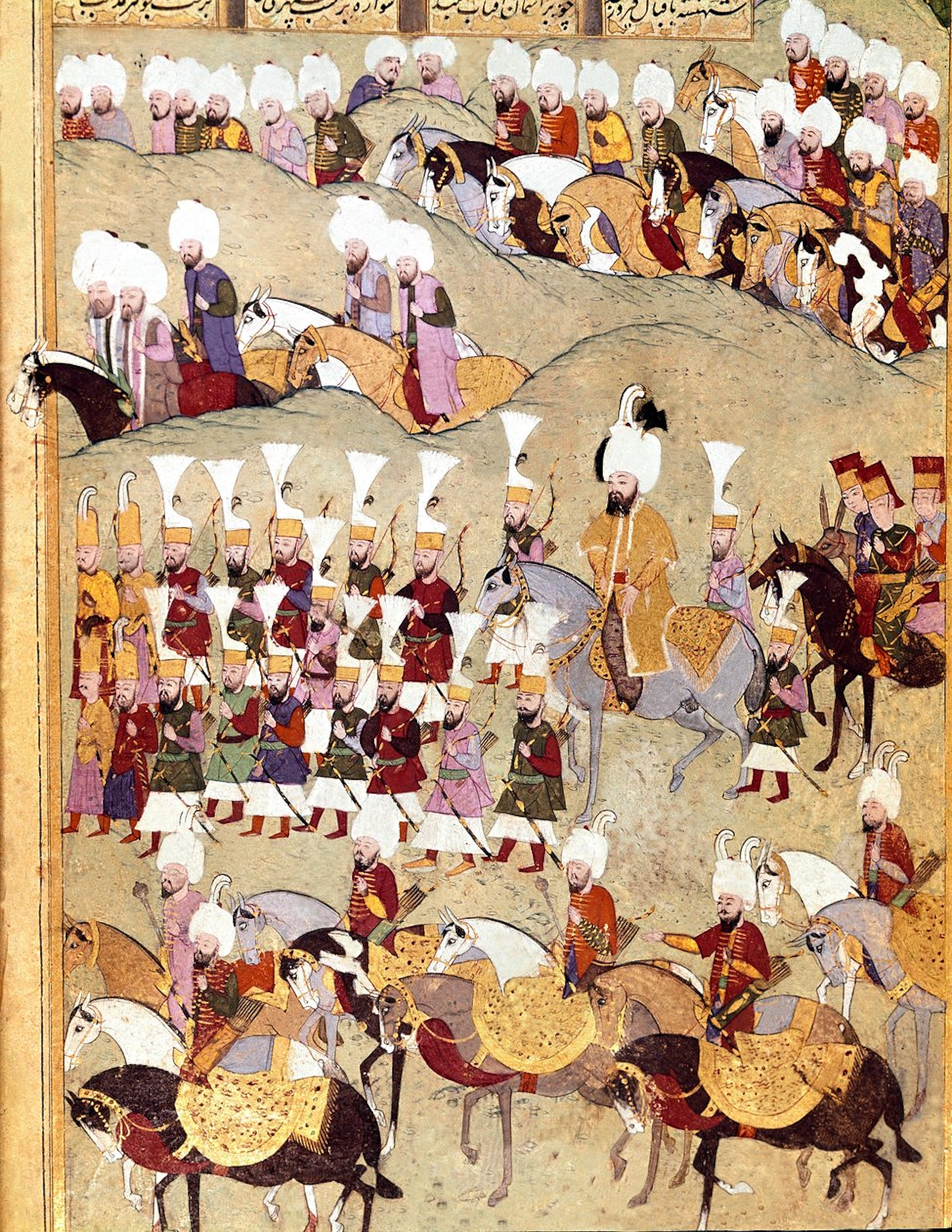
Sultan Murad III and his entourage, receiving the Persian ambassador Maksud in 1580. Sehinsahname (1592)

Abd al-Malik made a deal with the Ottoman troops by paying them a large amount of gold and sending them back to Algiers, suggesting a looser concept of vassalage than Murad III may have thought. Murad's name was recited in the Friday prayer and stamped on coinage marking the two traditional signs of sovereignty in the Islamic world. The reign of Abd al-Malik is understood to be a period of Moroccan vassalage to the Ottoman Empire. Abd al-Malik died in 1578 and was succeeded by his brother Ahmad al-Mansur who formally recognised the suzerainty of the Ottoman Sultan at the start of his reign while remaining de facto independent. He stopped minting coins in Murad's name, dropped his name from the Khutba and declared his full independence in 1582.

=== War with the Safavids ===
The Ottomans had been at peace with the neighbouring rival Safavid Empire since 1555, per the Treaty of Amasya, that for some time had settled border disputes. But in 1577 Murad declared war, starting the Ottoman–Safavid War (1578–1590), seeking to take advantage of the chaos in the Safavid court after the death of Shah Tahmasp I. Murad was influenced by viziers Lala Kara Mustafa Pasha and Sinan Pasha and disregarded the opposing counsel of Grand Vizier Sokollu. Murad's war with the Safavids would drag on for 12 years, ending with the Treaty of Constantinople (1590), which resulted in temporary significant territorial gains for the Ottomans.

=== Ottoman activity in the Horn of Africa ===
During his reign, an Ottoman Admiral by the name of Mir Ali Beg was successful in establishing Ottoman supremacy in numerous cities in the Swahili coast between Mogadishu and Kilwa. Ottoman suzerainty was recognised in Mogadishu in 1585 and Ottoman supremacy was also established in other cities such as Barawa, Mombasa, Kilifi, Pate, Lamu, and Faza.

=== Financial affairs ===
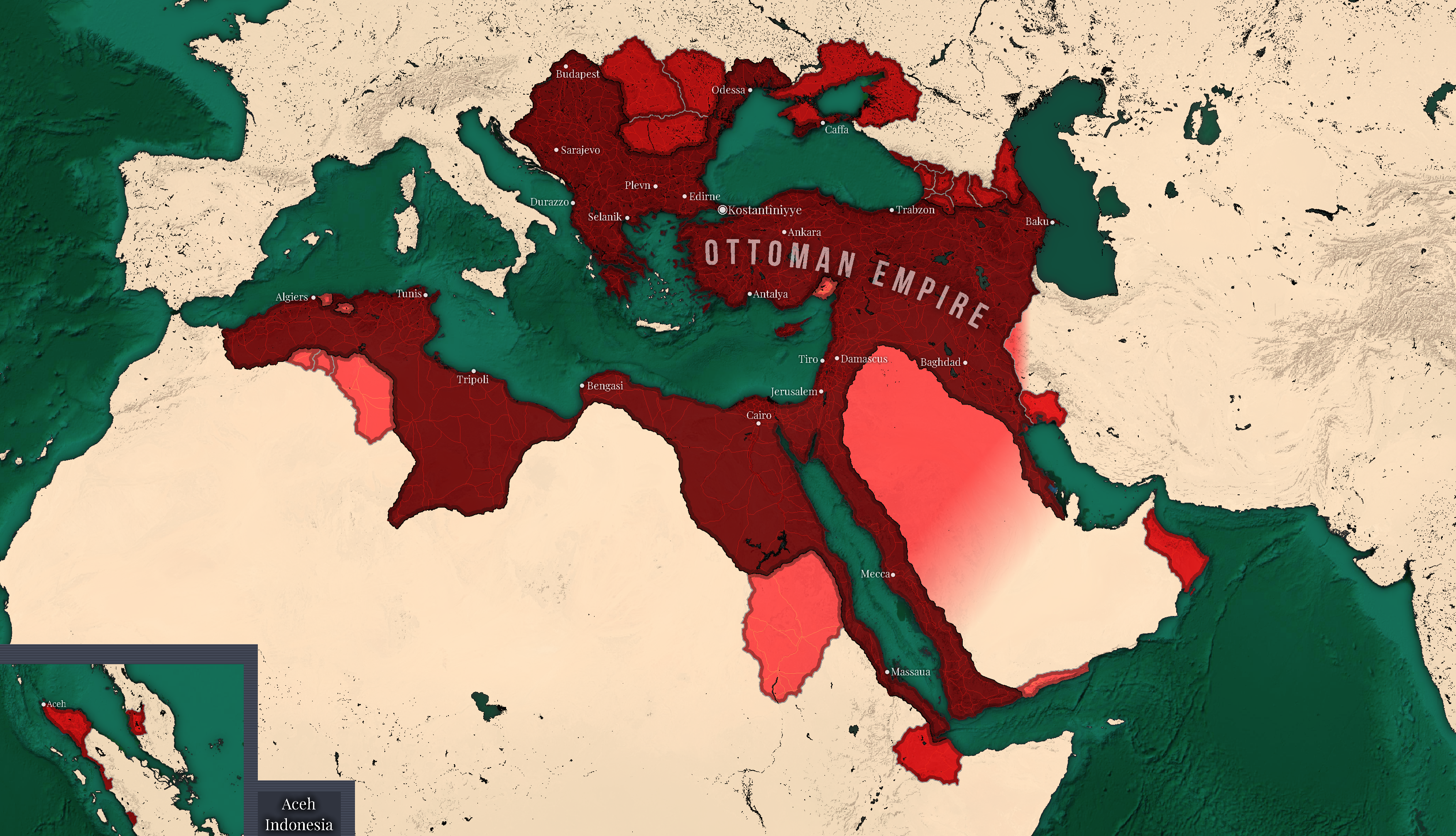
The Ottoman Empire reached its greatest extent in the Middle East under Murad III.

Murad's reign was a time of financial stress for the Ottoman state. To keep up with changing military techniques, the Ottomans trained infantrymen in the use of firearms, paying them directly from the treasury. By 1580 an influx of silver from the New World had caused high inflation and social unrest, especially among Janissaries and government officials who were paid in debased currency. Deprivation from the resulting rebellions, coupled with the pressure of over-population, was especially felt in Anatolia. Competition for positions within the government grew fierce, leading to bribery and corruption. Ottoman and Habsburg sources accuse Murad himself of accepting enormous bribes, including 20,000 ducats from a statesman in exchange for the governorship of Tripoli and Tunisia, thus outbidding a rival who had tried bribing the Grand Vizier.

During his period, excessive inflation was experienced, the value of silver money was constantly played, food prices increased. 400 dirhams should be cut from 600 dirhams of silver, while 800 was cut, which meant 100 percent inflation. For the same reason, the purchasing power of wage earners was halved, and the consequence was an uprising.

=== English pact ===
Numerous envoys and letters were exchanged between Elizabeth I and Sultan Murad III. In one correspondence, Murad entertained the notion that Islam and Protestantism had "much more in common than either did with Roman Catholicism, as both rejected the worship of idols", and argued for an alliance between England and the Ottoman Empire. To the dismay of Catholic Europe, England exported tin and lead (for cannon-casting) and ammunition to the Ottoman Empire, and Elizabeth seriously discussed joint military operations with Murad III during the outbreak of war with Spain in 1585, as Francis Walsingham was lobbying for a direct Ottoman military involvement against the common Spanish enemy. This diplomacy would be continued under Murad's successor Mehmed III, by both the sultan and Safiye Sultan alike.

== Personal life ==
=== Palace life ===
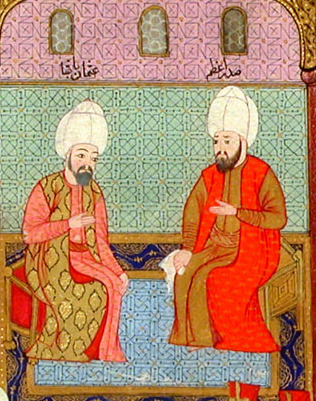
Commander Osman Pasha (left) conferring with Murad III (right). Şeca'atname (1598)

Following the example of his father Selim II, Murad was the second Ottoman sultan who never went on campaign during his reign, instead spending it entirely in Constantinople. During the final years of his reign, he did not even leave Topkapı Palace. For two consecutive years, he did not attend the Friday procession to the imperial mosque—an unprecedented breaking of custom. The Ottoman historian Mustafa Selaniki wrote that whenever Murad planned to go out to Friday prayer, he changed his mind after hearing of alleged plots by the Janissaries to dethrone him once he left the palace. Murad withdrew from his subjects and spent the majority of his reign keeping to the company of few people and abiding by a daily routine structured by the five daily Islamic prayers. Murad's personal physician Domenico Hierosolimitano described a typical day in the life of the sultan:

In the morning he rises at dawn to say his prayer for half an hour, then for another half-hour he writes. Then he is given something pleasant as a collation, and afterwards sets himself to read for another hour. Then he begins to give audience to the members of the Divan on the four days of the week that this occurs, as had been said above. Then he goes for a walk through the garden, taking pleasure in the delight of fountains and animals for another hour, taking with him the dwarves, buffoons and others to entertain him. Then he goes back once again to studying until he considers the time for lunch has arrived. He stays at table only half an hour, and rises (to go) once again into the garden for as long as he pleases. Then he goes to say his midday prayer. Then he stops to pass the time and amuse himself with the women, and he will stay one or two hours with them, when it is time to say the evening prayer. Then he returns to his apartments or, if it pleases him more, he stays in the garden reading or passing the time until evening with the dwarfs and buffoons, and then he returns to say his prayers, that is at nightfall. Then he dines and takes more time over dinner than over lunch, making conversation until two hours after dark, until it is time for prayer [...] He never fails to observe this schedule every day.

Özgen Felek argues that Murad's sedentary lifestyle and lack of participation in military campaigns earned him the disapproval of Mustafa Âlî and Mustafa Selaniki, the major Ottoman historians who lived during his reign. Their negative portrayals of Murad influenced later historians.

=== Children ===
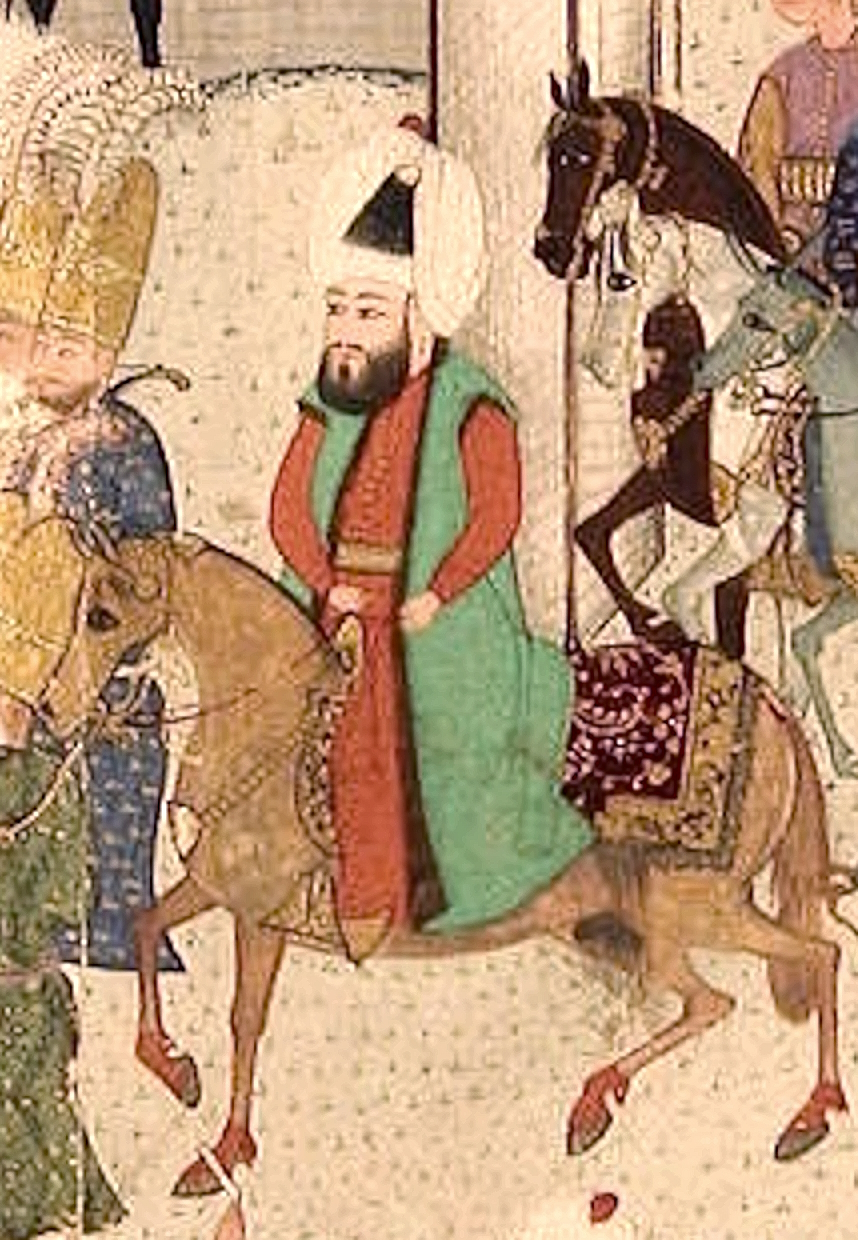
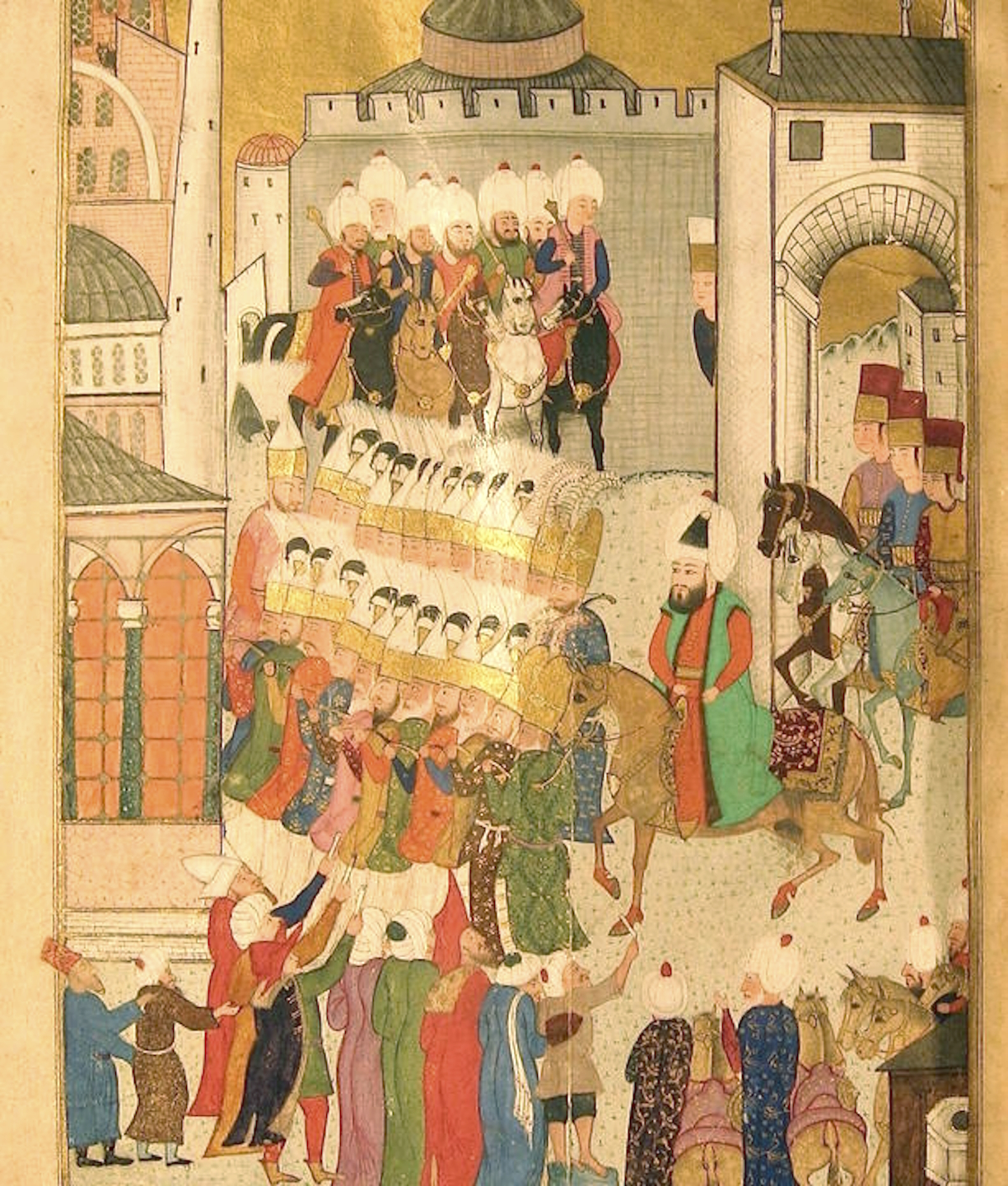
Murad III leaving the first gate of the Topkapi Palace. Nadiri's Diwan, ca. 1605 (TMSK H.889)

Before becoming sultan, Murad had been loyal to Safiye Sultan, his Albanian concubine. His monogamy was disapproved of by Nurbanu Sultan, who worried that Murad needed more sons to succeed him in case Mehmed died young. She also worried about Safiye's influence over her son and the Ottoman dynasty. Five or six years after his accession to the throne, Murad was given a pair of concubines by his sister Ismihan. Upon attempting sexual intercourse with them, he proved impotent. "The arrow [of Murad], [despite] keeping with his created nature, for many times [and] for many days has been unable to reach at the target of union and pleasure," wrote Mustafa Ali. Nurbanu accused Safiye and her retainers of causing Murad's impotence with witchcraft. Several of Safiye's servants were tortured by eunuchs in order to discover a culprit. Court physicians, working under Nurbanu's orders, eventually prepared a successful cure, but a side effect was a drastic increase in sexual appetite; by the time Murad died, he was said to have fathered over a hundred children. Nineteen of these were executed by Mehmed III when he became sultan.

=== Women at court ===
Influential ladies of his court included his mother Nurbanu Sultan, his sister Ismihan Sultan, wife of grand vizier Sokollu Mehmed Pasha, and musahibes (favourites) mistress of the housekeeper Canfeda Hatun, mistress of financial affairs Raziye Hatun, and the poet Hubbi Hatun, Finally, after the death of his mother and older sister, Safiye Sultan was the only influential woman in the court.

=== Eunuchs at court ===
Before Murad, the palace eunuchs had been mostly white, especially Circassians or Syrians. This began to change in 1582 when Murad gave an important position to a black eunuch. Before, the eunuchs' roles in the palace were racially determined: black eunuchs guarded the harem and the princesses, and white eunuchs guarded the Sultan and male pages in another part of the palace. The chief black eunuch was known as the Kizlar Agha, and the chief white eunuch was known as the Kapi Agha.

== Murad and the arts ==
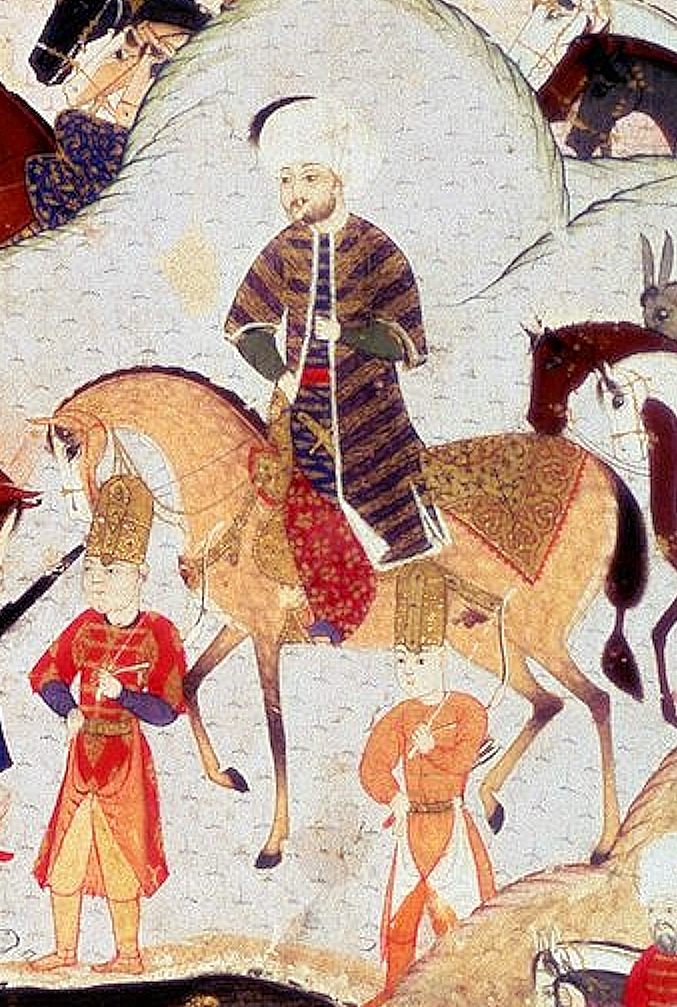
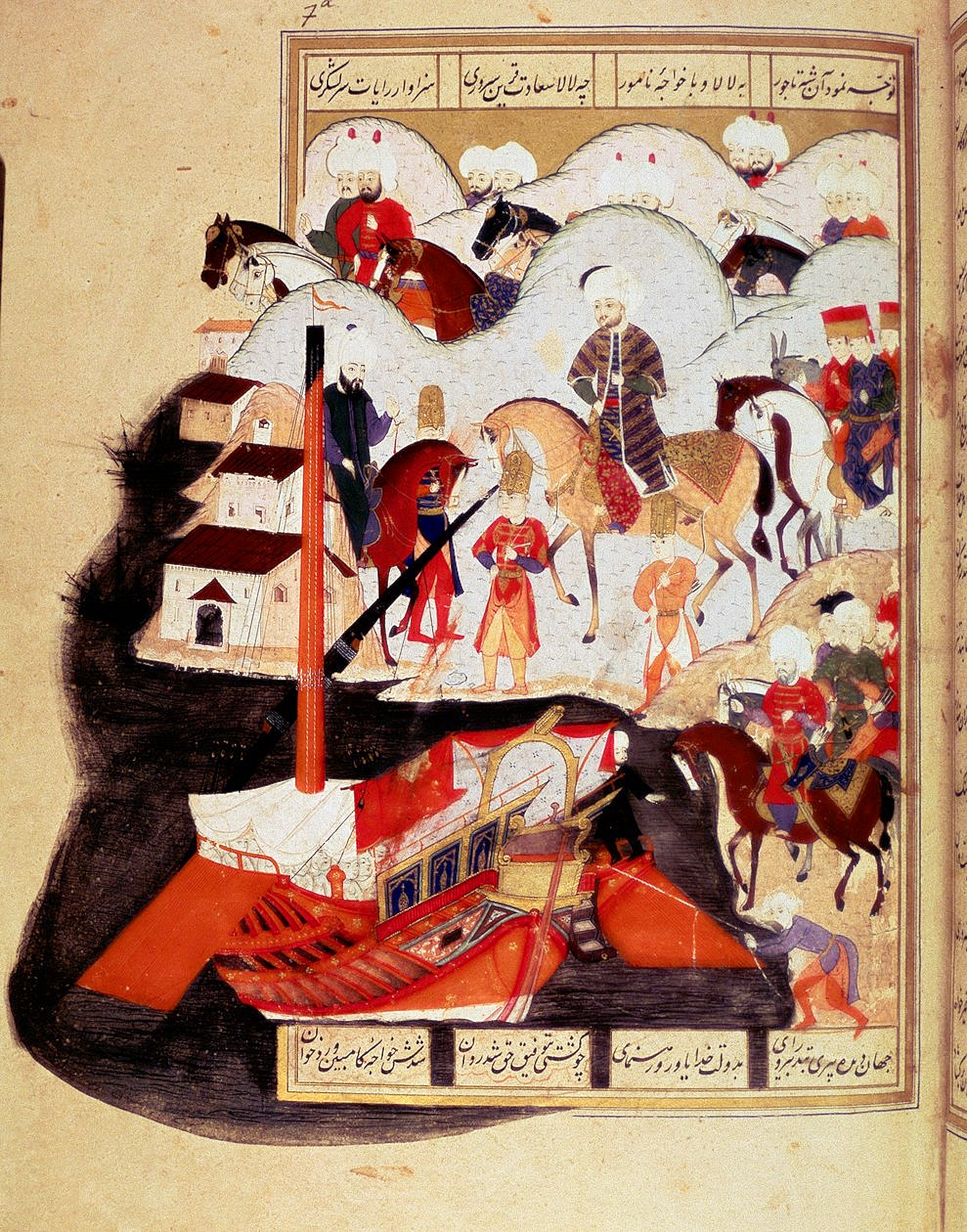
Sultan Murad III visiting the Port of Constantinople. Miniature from the Sehinsahname ("The Story of the King of Kings"), 1592

Murad took great interest in the arts, particularly miniatures and books. He actively supported the court of Society of Miniaturists, commissioning several volumes including the Siyer-i Nebi, the most heavily illustrated biographical work on the life of the Islamic prophet Muhammad, the Book of Skills, the Book of Festivities and the Book of Victories. He had two large alabaster urns transported from Pergamon and placed on two sides of the nave in the Hagia Sophia in Constantinople and a large wax candle dressed in tin which was donated by him to the Rila monastery in Bulgaria is on display in the monastery museum.

Murad also furnished the content of Kitabü’l-Menamat (The Book of Dreams), addressed to Murad's spiritual advisor, Şüca Dede. A collection of first person accounts, it tells of Murad's spiritual experiences as a Sufi disciple. Compiled from thousands of letters Murad wrote describing his dream visions, it presents a hagiographic self-portrait. Murad dreams of various activities, including being stripped naked by his father and having to sit on his lap, single-handedly killing 12,000 infidels in battle, walking on water, ascending to heaven, and producing milk from his fingers.

In another letter addressed to Şüca Dede, Murad wrote "I wish that God, may He be glorified and exalted, had not created this poor servant as the descendant of the Ottomans so that I would not hear this and that, and would not worry. I wish I were of unknown pedigree. Then, I would have one single task, and could ignore the whole world."

The diplomatic edition of these dream letters have been recently published by Ozgen Felek in Turkish.

== Death ==
Murad died from what is assumed to be natural causes in the Topkapı Palace on 16 January 1595 and was buried in a tomb next to the Hagia Sophia. In the mausoleum are 54 sarcophagus of the sultan, his wives and children that are also buried there. He is also responsible for changing the burial customs of the sultans' mothers. Murad had his mother Nurbanu buried next to her husband Selim II, making her the first consort to share a sultan's tomb.

== Family ==
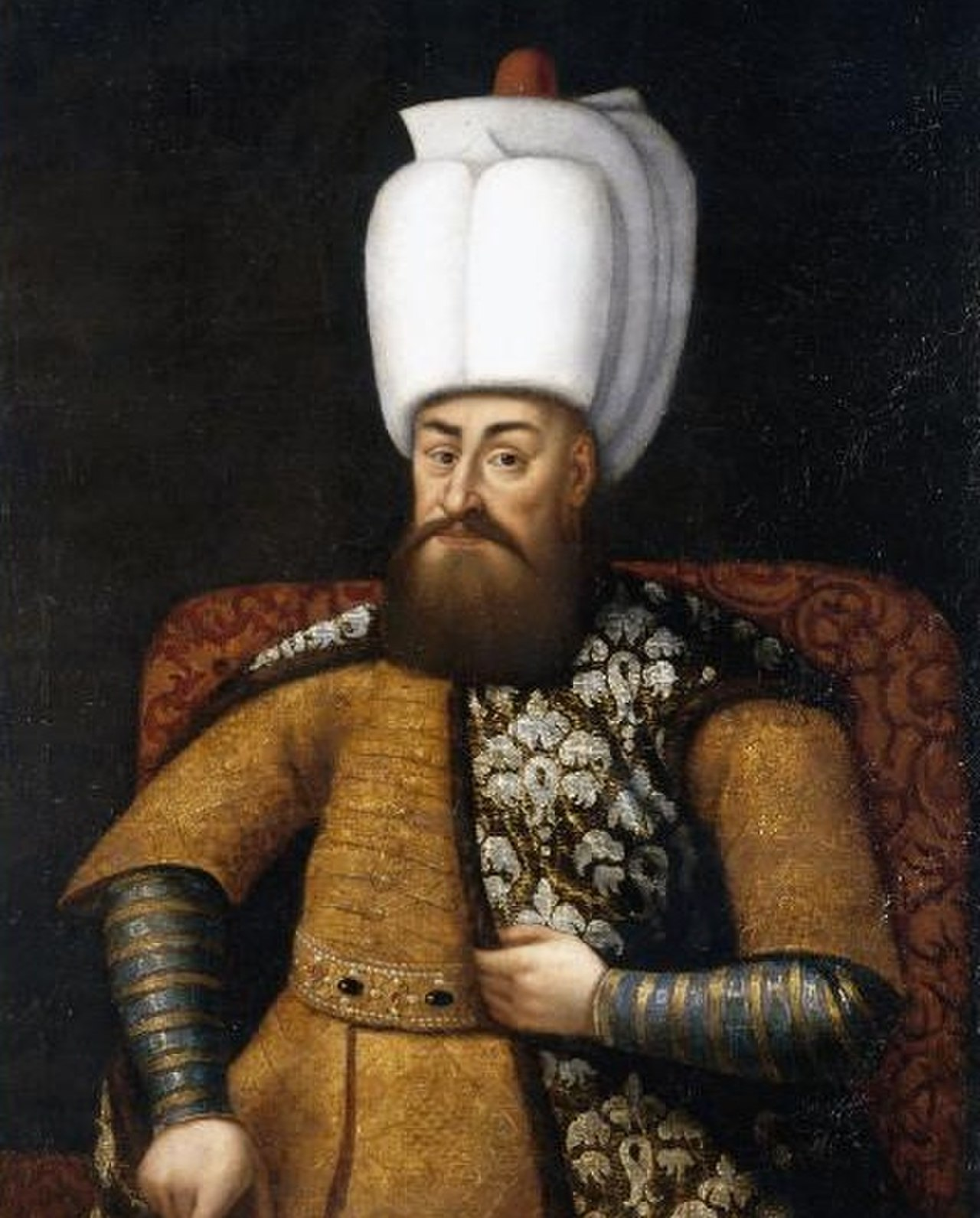
A later European depiction, attributed to a Spanish artist, 17th century

=== Consorts ===
Murad is believed to have had Safiye Sultan as his only concubine for circa twenty years. However, Safiye was opposed by Murad's mother, Nurbanu Sultan, and by his sister, Ismihan Sultan, and around 1580, she was exiled to the Old Palace on charges of having rendered the sultan impotent with a spell, after he had not succeeded or had not wanted to have sex with two concubines received by his sister. Furthermore, Nurbanu was concerned about the future of the dynasty, as she believed that Safiye's son alone, Mehmed, (two of three sons that Safiye gave to Murad were dead before 1580) were not enough to ensure the succession. After Safiye's exile, revoked only after Nurbanu's death on December 1583, Murad, to deny the rumor about his impotency, took a huge number of concubines and he had more than fifty known children, although according to sources the total number could exceed hundred.

At time of his death in 1595, Murad had at least thirty-five concubines, amongs others:

- Safiye Sultan, an ethnic Albanian. Haseki Sultan of Murad and Valide Sultan of Mehmed III;
- Şemsiruhsar Hatun, mother of Rukiye Sultan. She commissioned Koranic readings of prayers in the Prophet's mosque in Medina. She died before 1623.
- Mihriban Hatun;
- Şahıhuban Hatun; she commissioned a school in Fatih, where she is buried
- Nazperver Hatun; she commissioned a mosque in Eyüp
- Zerefşan Hatun
- Fakriye Hatun
- A concubine who died in August 1591, along with their stillborn son and were interred together.
- Fifteen pregnant concubines were placed in sacks and tossed into the Sea of Marmara, where they drowned, in 1595, by order of Mehmed III.
- A concubine seduced and made pregnant by Mehmed III when he was a prince. The act was a violation of the rules of the harem, so Mehmed’s grandmother, Nurbanu Sultan, ordered the girl to be drowned in order to protect her grandson.
- A daughter of Lady Chiajna

After the death of Murad III many of his concubines who became childless when at his accession Mehmed had his half-brothers killed, and others who never had children by Murad, were remarried off to palace officials, such as door keepers, cavalry forces (bölük halkı), and sergeants (çavus).

=== Sons ===
Murad III had at least 27 known sons.

On Murad's death in 1595 Mehmed III, his eldest son and new sultan, son of Safiye Sultan, executed the 19 half-brothers still alive and drowned seven pregnant concubines, fulfilling the Law of Fraticide.

Known sons of Murad III are:

- Mehmed III (26 May 1566, Manisa Palace, Manisa – 22 December 1603, Topkapı Palace, Constantinople, buried in Mehmed III Mausoleum, Hagia Sophia Mosque, Constantinople) – with Safiye Sultan, became the next sultan;
- Şehzade Selim (1567, Manisa Palace, Manisa – 25 May 1577, Topkapı Palace, Constantinople) – with Safiye Sultan.
- Şehzade Mahmud (1568, Manisa Palace, Manisa – ante 1580, Topkapı Palace, Constantinople, buried in Selim II Mausoleum, Hagia Sophia Mosque) – with Safiye Sultan.
- Şehzade Fülan (June 1582, Topkapi Palace, Constantinople – June 1582, Topkapi Palace, Constantinople. buried in Murad III Mausoleum, Hagia Sophia Mosque). Stillbirth.
- Şehzade Cihangir (February 1585, Topkapi Palace, Constantinople – August 1585, Topkapı Palace, Constantinople, buried in Murad III Mausoleum, Hagia Sophia Mosque); twin of Şehzade Süleyman.
- Şehzade Süleyman (February 1585, Topkapi Palace, Constantinople – 1585, Topkapi Palace, Constantinople, buried in Murad III Mausoleum, Hagia Sophia Mosque); twin of Şehzade Cihangir.
- Şehzade Abdüllah (1585, Topkapi Palace, Constantinople – murdered 28 January 1595, Topkapı Palace, Constantinople, buried in Murad III Mausoleum, Hagia Sophia Mosque);
- Şehzade Mustafa (1585, Topkapi Palace, Constantinople – murdered 28 January 1595, Topkapı Palace, Constantinople, buried in Murad III Mausoleum, Hagia Sophia Mosque);
- Şehzade Abdürrahman (1585, Topkapi Palace, Constantinople – murdered 28 January 1595, Topkapı Palace, Constantinople, buried in Murad III Mausoleum, Hagia Sophia Mosque);
- Şehzade Bayezid (1586, Topkapi Palace, Constantinople – murdered 28 January 1595, Topkapı Palace, Constantinople, buried in Murad III Mausoleum, Hagia Sophia Mosque);
- Şehzade Hasan (1586, Topkapi Palace, Constantinople – died 1591, Topkapı Palace, Constantinople, buried in Murad III Mausoleum, Hagia Sophia Mosque);
- Şehzade Cihangir (1587, Topkapi Palace, Constantinople – murdered 28 January 1595, Topkapı Palace, Constantinople, buried in Murad III Mausoleum, Hagia Sophia Mosque);
- Şehzade Yakub (1587, Topkapi Palace, Constantinople – murdered 28 January 1595, Topkapı Palace, Constantinople, buried in Murad III Mausoleum, Hagia Sophia Mosque);
- Şehzade Ahmed (?, Topkapi Palace, Constantinople – before 1595, Topkapı Palace, Constantinople, buried in Murad III Mausoleum, Hagia Sophia Mosque);
- Şehzade Fülan (August 1591, stillbirth);
- Şehzade Alaeddin (?, Topkapi Palace, Constantinople – murdered 28 January 1595, Topkapı Palace, Constantinople, buried in Murad III Mausoleum, Hagia Sophia Mosque);
- Şehzade Davud (?, Topkapi Palace, Constantinople – murdered 28 January 1595, Topkapı Palace, Constantinople, buried in Murad III Mausoleum, Hagia Sophia Mosque);
- Şehzade Alemşah (?, Topkapi Palace, Constantinople – murdered 28 January 1595, Topkapı Palace, Constantinople, buried in Murad III Mausoleum, Hagia Sophia Mosque);
- Şehzade Ali (?, Topkapi Palace, Constantinople – murdered 28 January 1595, Topkapı Palace, Constantinople, buried in Murad III Mausoleum, Hagia Sophia Mosque);
- Şehzade Hüseyin (?, Topkapi Palace, Constantinople – murdered 28 January 1595, Topkapı Palace, Constantinople, buried in Murad III Mausoleum, Hagia Sophia Mosque);
- Şehzade Ishak (?, Topkapi Palace, Constantinople – murdered 28 January 1595, Topkapı Palace, Constantinople, buried in Murad III Mausoleum, Hagia Sophia Mosque);
- Şehzade Murad (?, Topkapi Palace, Constantinople – murdered 28 January 1595, Topkapı Palace, Constantinople, buried in Murad III Mausoleum, Hagia Sophia Mosque);
- Şehzade Osman (?, Topkapi Palace, Constantinople – died 1587, Topkapı Palace, Constantinople, buried in Murad III Mausoleum, Hagia Sophia Mosque);
- Şehzade Yusuf (?, Topkapi Palace, Constantinople – murdered 28 January 1595, Topkapı Palace, Constantinople, buried in Murad III Mausoleum, Hagia Sophia Mosque);
- Şehzade Korkud (?, Topkapi Palace, Constantinople – murdered 28 January 1595, Topkapı Palace, Constantinople, buried in Murad III Mausoleum, Hagia Sophia Mosque);
- Şehzade Ömer (?, Topkapi Palace, Constantinople – murdered 28 January 1595, Topkapı Palace, Constantinople, buried in Murad III Mausoleum, Hagia Sophia Mosque);
- Şehzade Selim (?, Topkapi Palace, Constantinople – murdered 28 January 1595, Topkapı Palace, Constantinople, buried in Murad III Mausoleum, Hagia Sophia Mosque);

In addition to these, a European braggart, Alexander of Montenegro, claimed to be the lost son of Murad III and Safiye Sultan, presenting himself with the name of Şehzade Yahya and claiming the throne for it. His claims were never proven and appear dubious to say the least.

=== Daughters ===
According to Mustafa Selaniki, Murad had twenty-seven daughters still alive at his death in 1595, of whom nineteen died of plague (or smallpox) in 1598.

It is not known if and how many daughters may have died before him.

Known daughters of Murad III are:

- Hümaşah Sultan (Manisa, c. 1564 – Constantinople, buried in Murad III Mausoleum, Hagia Sophia Mosque) – with Safiye Sultan. Also called Hüma Sultan. She married Nişar Mustafazade Mehmed Pasha (died 1586). She may have then married Serdar Ferhad Pasha (d. 1595) in 1591. She was lastly married in 1605 to Nakkaş Hasan Pasha (died 1622);
- Ayşe Sultan (Manisa, c. 1565 – Constantinople, 15 May 1605, buried in Murad III Mausoleum, Hagia Sophia Mosque) – with Safiye Sultan. Married firstly in 1586, to Ibrahim Pasha, married secondly in 1602, to Yemişçi Hasan Pasha, married thirdly in 1604, to Güzelce Mahmud Pasha.
- Fatma Sultan (Manisa, c. 1573 – Constantinople, 1620, buried in Murad III Mausoleum, Hagia Sophia Mosque) – with Safiye Sultan. Married firstly in 1593, to Halil Pasha, married secondly in 1604, to Cafer Pasha; married thirdly in 1610, to Hizir Pasha.
- Mihrimah Sultan (Constantinople, 1578/1579 – after 1625, buried in Murad III Mausoleum, Hagia Sophia Mosque). Married firstly in 1600, to Mirahur Ahmed Pasha, married secondly in 1618, to Çerkes Mehmed Pasha.
- Fahriye Sultan (c. 1594 - 16 November 1678, buried in Murad III Mausoleum, Hagia Sophia Mosque) called also Fahri Sultan. She married firstly to Cuhadar Ahmed Pasha, Governor of Mosul, married secondly to Sofu Bayram Pasha, Governor of Bosnia (died in 1633);
- Rukiye Sultan (buried in Murad III Mausoleum, Hagia Sophia Mosque) – with Şemsiruhsar Hatun.
- Mihriban Sultan (buried in Murad III Mausoleum, Hagia Sophia Mosque) married in 1613;
- Hatice Sultan (1583 – 1648, buried in Şehzade Mosque), was married in 1598 to Sokolluzade Lala Mehmed Pasha and had two sons and a daughter. She participated in the reparation of the minarets of Bayezid Veli Mosque inside Kerch Fortress in 1599. After widowed, in 1613 she married Gürşci Mehmed Pasha of Kefe, governor of Bosnia.
- Fethiye Sultan (buried in Murad III Mausoleum, Hagia Sophia Mosque).
- Beyhan Sultan (fl. 1648), married in 1613 to Vizier Kurşuncuzade Mustafa Pasha;
- Sehime Sultan, married in 1613 to Topal Mehmed Pasha, formerly a Kapucıbaşı;
- A daughter married to Davud Pasha;
- A daughter married in 1613 to Kücük Mirahur Mehmed Agha;
- A daughter married in 1613 to Mirahur-i Evvel Muslu Agha;
- A daughter married in 1613 to Bostancıbaşı Hasan Agha;
- A daughter married in 1613 to Cığalazade Mehmed Bey (son of Cığalazade Yusuf Sinan Pasha and Safiye Hanimsultan);
- Nineteen daughters, died of plague in 1598;
- A daughter who died young on 29 July 1585.

== In fiction ==
- Miguel de Cervantes's 1615 play La gran sultana features sultan Amurates which is believed to be inspired by Murad III.
- Murad is portrayed by the Romanian actor Colea Răutu in the historic epic film Michael the Brave.
- Orhan Pamuk's historical novel Benim Adım Kırmızı (My Name is Red, 1998) takes place at the court of Murad III, during nine snowy winter days of 1591, which the writer uses in order to convey the tension between East and West. Murad is not specifically named in the book, and is referred to only as "Our Sultan".
- The Harem Midwife by Roberta Rich - a historical fiction set in Constantinople (1578) which follows Hannah, a midwife, who tends to many of the women in Sultan Murad III's harem.
- In the 2011 TV series Muhteşem Yüzyıl, Murad III is portrayed by Turkish actor Serhan Onat.

Murad III House of Osman Born: 4 July 1546 Died: 15 January 1595[aged 48]
Regnal titles
Preceded by Selim II	Sultan of the Ottoman Empire; 12 December 1574 – 15 January 1595	Succeeded by Mehmed III
Sunni Islam titles
Preceded by Selim II	Caliph of the Ottoman Caliphate; 12 December 1574 – 15 January 1595	Succeeded by Mehmed III
