= Hubbi Hatun =

Ottoman lady-in-waiting and poet (d. 1590)

- Born: Amasya, Ottoman Empire
- Died: 1590; Istanbul, Ottoman Empire
- Buried: Eyüp cemetery, Istanbul
- Spouse: Şemsi Efendi
- Issue: One daughter
- Father: Şeyh Akşemseddin

Ayşe Hubbi Hatun (Ottoman Turkish: حبی خاتون; "the living one" or "womanly"; died 1590) was a lady-in-waiting to Sultan Selim II and later to his son Sultan Murad III of the Ottoman Empire. She was a notable Ottoman poet of the sixteenth century.

== Early and personal life ==
Born as Ayşe, Hubbi Hatun spent her early childhood in the city of Amasya. She was the daughter of Şeyh Akşemseddin, and granddaughter of Beşiktaşlı Şeyh Yahya Efendi. She was very well educated, and had learned Arabic, and studied poetry.

She married her first cousin, son of her maternal aunt, Prince Selim's tutor, Akşemseddinzade Şemsi Efendi, milk brother of Sultan Suleiman the Magnificent. She had a daughter who married the poet Mehmed Vusuli Efendi, known as Molla Çelebi.

A garden in Fındıklı belonged to Hubbi Hatun.

== Career ==
After her husband's death in 1551, she remained at the court and was a boon companion of Prince Selim. Hubbi Hatun was famous for her beauty and poetry. She was rumoured to have had love affairs with several of Selim's courtiers. When Selim ascended the throne in 1566, Hubbi Hatun came to Istanbul. After Selim's death in 1574, Hubbi Hatun became a lady-in-waiting to his son, the new Sultan Murad III. She was influential in the reign of both Sultan Selim II and his son Murad III, along with other musahibes (favourites) of Murad, who included mistress of the housekeeper Canfeda Hatun and mistress of financial affairs Raziye Hatun.

== Death ==
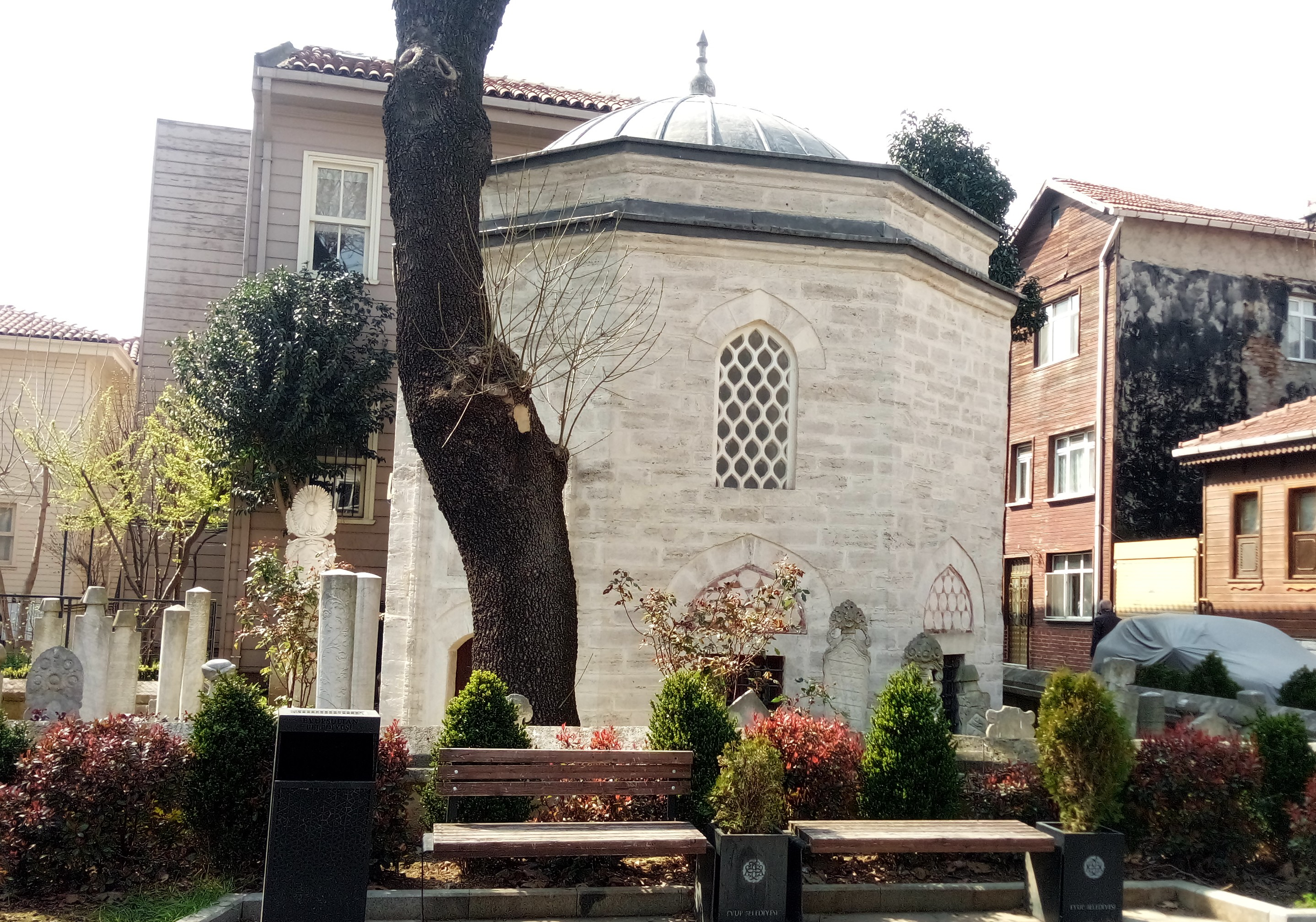
Hubbi Hatun Tomb in Eyup Sultan

Hubbi Hatun died in 1590 in Istanbul and was buried at Eyüp Cemetery.

== Poetry ==
She wrote lyric poems (gazel) and odes (kaside). She also wrote a narrative poem (mesnevi) under the title "Hürşid and Cemşid", which consisted of more than three thousand beyits. Her style of writing poetry was not feminine, and she wrote just like her male colleagues. She was praised in tezkires for her poetic skills. The poetic persona (mahlas) "Hubbi", with which Hubbi Hatun signed her gazels in the last hemistich, can also be found at the end of a risale (message or letter), a short work on religious warfare entitled "İmadu’l-Cihad".

The following poetry was written by Hubbi Hatun.

Being feminine is no shame to the name of the sun...
Being masculine is no glory to the crescent moon.

Another set of poetry written by Hubbi Hatun included, "Der Rağbet-i Dua":

Dua temsili Yusuf gibi her dem
Kim ana müşteridir halkı alem

Verir her kişi makdurunca gevher
Anın ta müşterisinden olalar

Sen oldun şimdi hem ol zen misali
Kaçan arz eyledi Yusuf cemali

Geturüp nice rişte anda bir zen
Hıridar oldu ana canu dilden

== Sources ==
- Fleischer, Cornell H. (July 14, 2014). Bureaucrat and Intellectual in the Ottoman Empire: The Historian Mustafa Ali (1541-1600). Princeton University Press. ISBN 978-1-400-85421-9.
- Petruccioli, Attilio (1997). Gardens in the Time of the Great Muslim Empires: Theory and Design. E. J. Brill. ISBN 978-9-004-10723-6.
- Faroqhi, Suraiya (November 29, 2005). Subjects of the Sultan: Culture and Daily Life in the Ottoman Empire. I.B.Tauris. ISBN 978-1-850-43760-4.
- Çiçek, Kemal; Kuran, Ercüment; Göyünç, Nejat; Ortaylı, İlber (2000). The Great Ottoman-Turkish Civilisation [sic]: Culture and arts. Yeni Türkiye. ISBN 978-9-756-78217-0.
- Havlioğlu, Didem (2010). On the margins and between the lines: Ottoman women poets from the fifteenth to the twentieth centuries. BRILL.
- Sakaoğlu, Necdet (2008). Bu mülkün kadın sultanları: Vâlide sultanlar, hâtunlar, hasekiler, kadınefendiler, sultanefendiler. Oğlak Yayıncılık. ISBN 978-9-753-29623-6.
- Andrews, Walter G.; Kalpakl, Mehmet (January 13, 2005). The Age of Beloveds: Love and the Beloved in Early-Modern Ottoman and European Culture and Society. Duke University Press. ISBN 978-0-822-33424-8.
- Ersöz, Emine. XV.-XVI. YY Osmanlı Döneminde Kadın Şairler.
