= Sultanate of Women =

Period in the Ottoman Empire

The Sultanate of Women (Ottoman Turkish: قادينلر سلطنتى, romanized: Kadınlar Saltanatı) was a period when some concubines, mothers, sisters and grandmothers of the sultans of the Ottoman Empire exerted political influence.

This phenomenon took place from roughly 1534 to 1715, beginning in the reign of Suleiman the Magnificent with the rise of Hürrem Sultan and ending with the death of Gülnuş Sultan. These women were either the concubines of the sultan, referred to as haseki sultans, or the mothers of the sultan, known as valide sultans. All of them were of slave origin, as was expected during the sultanate, since the traditional idea of marriage was considered inappropriate for the sultan, who was not expected to have any personal allegiances beyond his governmental role; however, Hürrem Sultan and Nurbanu Sultan managed to become the legal wife of Suleiman I and Selim II respectively and Safiye Sultan and Kösem Sultan might have also married their respective sultans.

During this time, some haseki and valide sultans held political and social sway, which allowed them to influence the daily running of the empire and undertake philanthropic works as well as to request the construction of buildings such as the large Haseki Sultan Mosque complex and the prominent Valide Sultan Mosque, also known as the New Mosque, in Eminönü.

== Historical precedents ==
This period was novel for the Ottoman Empire but not without precedent since the Seljuk rulers, the predecessors to the Ottomans, often let noble women play an active role in public policy and affairs, despite the resistance of other male officials.

During the fourteenth century, the agency of women in government began to shrink. This was the age of Ottoman expansion where most sultans elected to "lead from the horse", moving around with a court of advisors, viziers, and religious leaders as the army conquered new lands. Ottoman policy from the fifteenth century onwards was to send young princes and their mothers to provincial governorships in Trabzon, Manisa and Amasya in Anatolia. This had the effect of keeping all the women with connections to the higher levels of government away from anywhere where they could hold meaningful power. The practice of fratricide—in which an ascendant sultan would execute all his brothers to secure his throne—made the wives and mothers of princes even more dependent on their men.

== Early years ==
The situation began to change at the beginning of the 16th century with the concurrence of two significant events: the end of Ottoman expansion, and the absorption of the Ottoman Imperial Harem into the palace proper. During the reign of Süleiman the Magnificent, it became clear that the expansion of the empire had reached its limit, with borders stretching thousands of miles in nearly every direction. The sultan could no longer afford to go on extended military campaigns, especially after the failure of the Siege of Vienna.

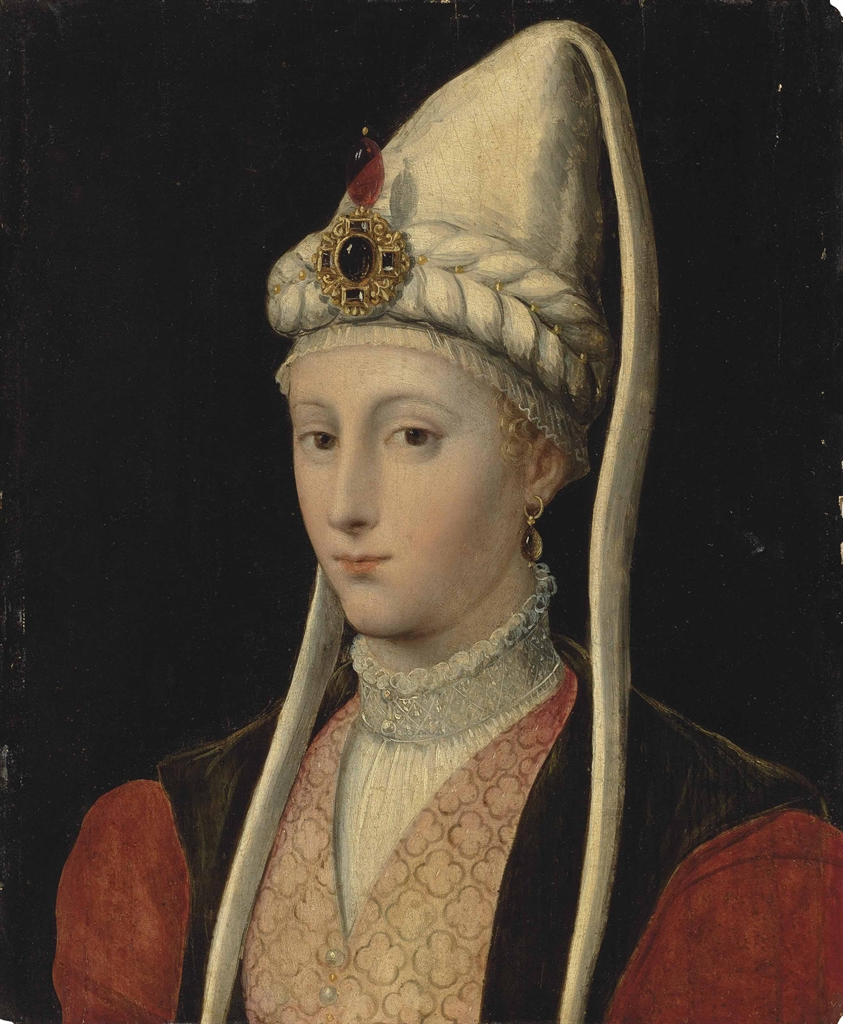
A painting of Hürrem Sultan by a follower of Titian

In addition, Süleiman's reign marked the absorption of the imperial harem into the palace and political sphere as he became the first sultan to be officially married to a woman named Roxelana, later known as Hürrem Sultan. Before the Sultanate of Women, the sultan did not marry but kept a harem of slave concubines who produced his heirs, with each concubine producing just one son then following him to the province they were assigned to lead instead of remaining in Istanbul.

=== Hürrem Sultan ===
The first haseki sultan was Hürrem Sultan, victim of the Crimean slave trade and wife of Süleiman the Magnificent, who became known as Hürrem Sultan after her conversion to Islam. Roxelana was mistakenly assumed to be of Russian descent, probably because of a mistranslation of her name, and European visitors treated her as Russian. Her ancestry was actually Ruthenian. Her Turkish name Hürrem meant "Laughing One", or "Joyful" in testament to her character. She was one of the most powerful and prominent women in History of the Ottoman Empire, is considered the initiator of the Sultanate of Women.

Scholars are unsure when she arrived in the imperial harem, since there is no data in the record of concubines, although documents recording the birth of her first son acknowledge her presence in 1521. Her significance was established with her marriage to Süleiman after the death of his mother, when she became the first actual wife of a sultan in more than two hundred years. Since all concubines were slaves, Roxelana also became the first concubine to be freed from slavery. The new title of Haseki Sultan (interpreted by Europeans as "Empress Consort") created for her continued to be given to some of the favorite consorts (wives or concubines) of later sultans.

Hürrem engaged in philanthropy, particularly in the building of communal spaces where subjects could spend time. The most prominent of these was the Haseki Sultan Complex in Istanbul, built in the 1530s, which included a women's medical centre, a school, a mosque, and a soup kitchen for feeding the poor. She died in 1558 in Istanbul, after the deaths of her eldest and youngest sons. Nearly five hundred years after her death, the claim of Russian heritage was removed from her tomb in January 2019.

== Political significance ==
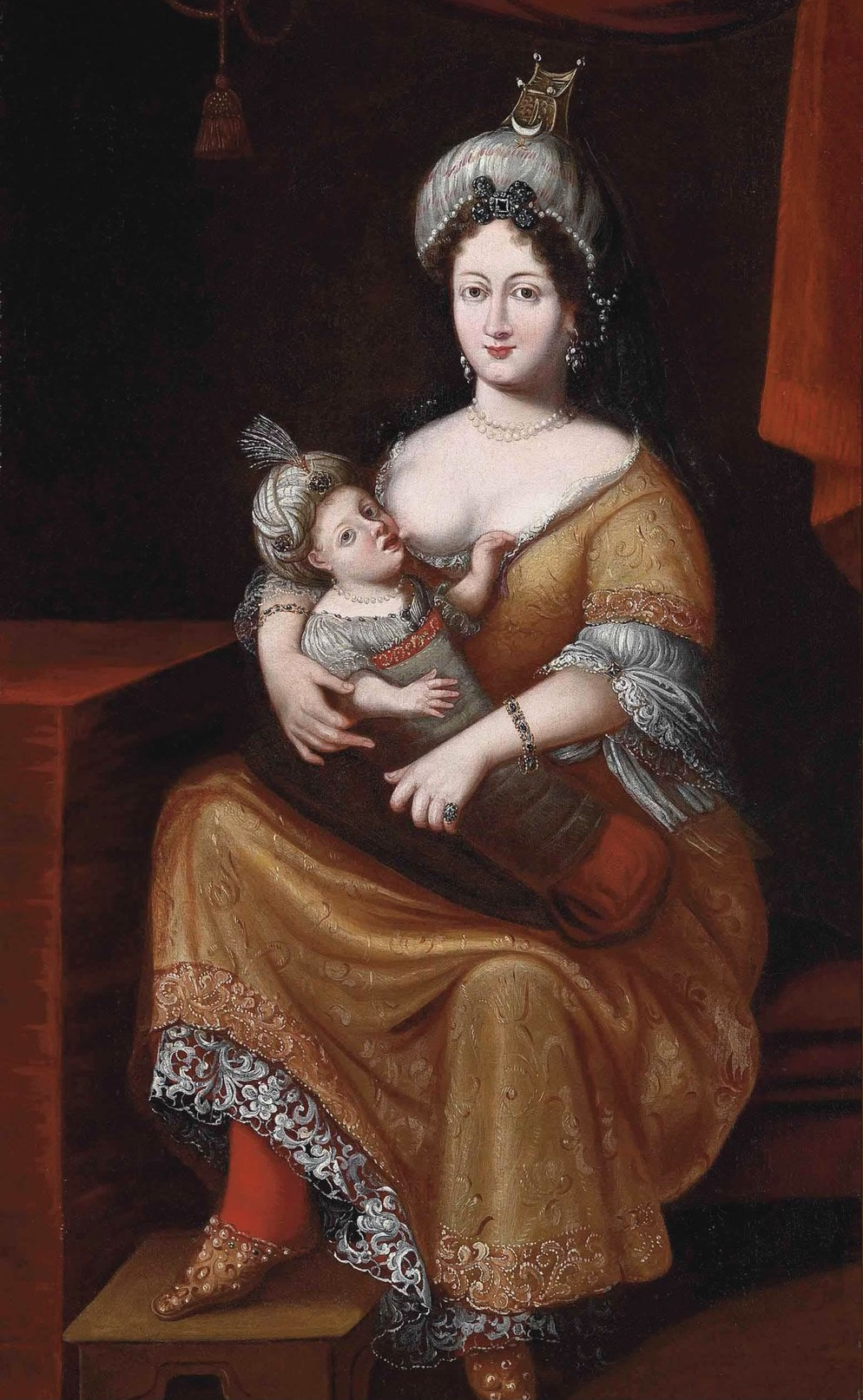
Kösem Sultan was the highest-ranking woman in Ottoman history.

In the first half of the 17th century, six sultans, several of whom were children, took the throne. As a result, some valide sultans ruled both during their sons' periods in power, and during the interregnums. Their prominence was not accepted by everyone. Despite their direct connection to the sultans, the valide sultans often faced opposition from the viziers, as well as from public opinion. Where their male predecessors had won favour with the public through military conquest and charisma, female leaders had to rely on imperial ceremonies and the construction of monuments and public works. Such public works, known as hayrat or works of piety, were often constructed extravagantly in the name of the sultana, as had been the tradition for imperial Islamic women.

Weddings were a common cause for celebration and an opportunity for imperial princesses to display their wealth and power while also promoting charity. As Fatma Sultan, daughter of Murad III, was about to be married to a prominent admiral, she gave newly minted coins to all the onlookers, some making off with a whole skirt-full of wealth.

The death of a sultan's consort or mother could inspire even greater extravagance. For example, the death of Hürrem Sultan brought crowds of mourners onto the streets, including the sultan himself, who was normally expected to isolate himself in the palace during the funeral of a family member. On this occasion, coins and food were distributed to the funeral attendees as a tribute to the sultana's generous and caring nature.

The most enduring accomplishments of many of the wives and mothers of the sultans were their large public works projects, usually in the form of mosques, schools and monuments. The construction and maintenance of these projects provided crucial economic liquidity during a period otherwise marked by economic stagnation and corruption while also leaving powerful and long-lasting symbols of the sultanate's power and benevolence. While the creation of public works was always an obligation of the sultanate, sultanas such as Süleiman's mother, consort and daughter, Hafsa, Hürrem and Mihrimah Sultan, undertook projects that were larger and more lavish than any woman before them - and most men as well.

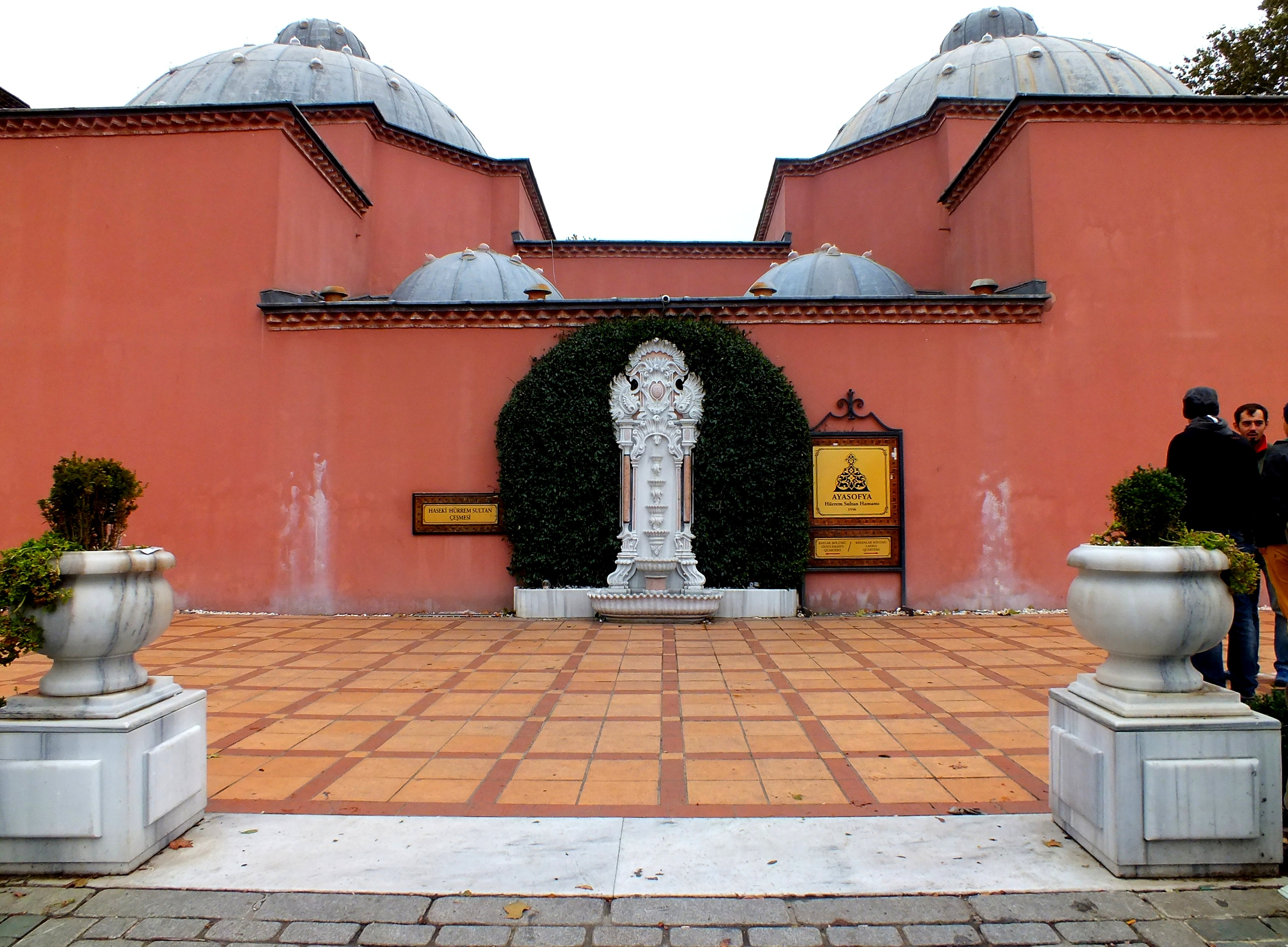
Ayasofya Hamamı, one of the hayrat constructed in the name of Hürrem Sultan.

=== Kösem Sultan ===
Kösem Sultan (1589–1651), born in Tinos, was one of the most powerful women and the highest ranking woman in the History of the Ottoman Empire. She was the most trusted advisor of Sultan Ahmed I and his Haseki Sultan. She was active in the Ottoman administration as the Sultan's consort. Historians credit her with persuading him to spare the life of his younger half-brother (who eventually became Mustafa I), thus putting an end to the centuries-old practice of fratricide in the Ottoman Empire. After Ahmed died in 1617, she was instrumental in Mustafa's enthronement and, after his second deposition in 1623, she assumed absolute power and dominant as a Valide Sultan and Naib-I Saltanat (regent) three times, during minority of her son Murad IV from 1623 to 1632, during the unstable reign of Ibrahim (r. 1640–1648) and during the early reign of her grandson Mehmed IV from 1648 until her assassination on 2 September 1651. Kösem wielded unparalleled political power and influenced the empire's foreign and domestic policies.

=== Turhan Sultan ===
Turhan Sultan governed the Ottoman Empire as regent during the minority of her son Mehmed IV from 1651 to 1656, having won a struggle with his grandmother (Kösem Sultan) for the role. One of the most powerful women of Ottoman Empire, she also contributed to the empire's defense, spending large amounts of money on the reconstruction and fortification of key military strongholds. When her son Mehmed IV returned from a successful military campaign, Turhan arranged a royal procession to retrace his warpath, and share in the glory of his victory. She was responsible for the construction of the Yeni Mosque (Yeni Cami) at Eminönü.

== Opposition ==
Although this was a time when imperial women held unprecedented power, they were not without opponents. In 1582, a grand vizier openly expressed his anger at a valide sultan's presence in the council. In 1599, the Shaykh al-Islām complained about the valide's involvement in government affairs, especially in appointments and dismissals. In 1640, a Venetian ambassador tried to send a letter to the valide through the grand vizier who refused to transmit it, claiming that she was a mere slave without power of her own. Such opposition implies that the valide sultan held a great deal of authority which the vizier resented. Many contemporary foreign ambassadors reported that those wanting to do business with the Ottoman Empire needed to approach the sultan's mother before anyone else.

== Influential sultanas during the period ==
Name	Born	Consort	Children	Death
Hürrem Sultan	c. 1505	Suleiman I	Şehzade Mehmed, Mihrimah Sultan, Selim II, Şehzade Abdullah, Şehzade Bayezid, and Şehzade Cihangir	15 April 1558
Mihrimah Sultan	September 1522	The only daughter of Suleiman I and Hürrem Sultan, and wife of Grand Vizier Rüstem Pasha	Ayşe Hümaşah Sultan and Sultanzade Osman Bey	25 January 1578
Nurbanu Sultan	c. 1525	Selim II	Şah Sultan, Gevherhan Sultan, Ismihan Sultan, and Murad III	7 December 1583
Safiye Sultan	c. 1550	Murad III	Hümaşah Sultan, Mehmed III, Şehzade Mahmud, Şehzade Selim, Ayşe Sultan, Fatma Sultan, and Mihrimah Sultan (disputed)	January/April 1619
Handan Sultan	c. 1570	Mehmed III	Fatma Sultan, Şehzade Selim, Şehzade Süleyman, Ayşe Sultan, Şah Sultan, and Ahmed I	9 November 1605
Halime Sultan	c. 1570	Mehmed III	Şehzade Mahmud, Hatice Sultan, Fülane Sultan, and Mustafa I	after 1623
Kösem Sultan	c. 1589	Ahmed I	Şehzade Mehmed, Ayşe Sultan, Fatma Sultan, Gevherhan Sultan (disputed), Hanzade Sultan, Murad IV, Şehzade Kasım, Şehzade Süleyman (disputed), Atike Sultan, and Ibrahim I	2 September 1651
Turhan Sultan	c. 1627	Ibrahim I	Mehmed IV, Beyhan Sultan (disputed), and Atike Sultan	4 August 1683
Gülnuş Sultan	c. 1642	Mehmed IV	Hatice Sultan, Mustafa II, Ahmed III, Ayşe Sultan, Ümmügülsüm Sultan, and Fatma Ematullah Sultan	6 November 1715

== See also ==
- Cariye
