= Semiz Ahmed Pasha =

Grand Vizier of the Ottoman Empire (1579-1580)

36th Grand Vizier of the Ottoman Empire
- In office 13 October 1579 – 27 April 1580
- Sultan: Murad III
- Preceded by: Sokollu Mehmed Pasha
- Succeeded by: Lala Mustafa Pasha

Personal details
- Born: 1492
- Died: 27 April 1580 (aged 87–88) Constantinople, Ottoman Empire (modern Istanbul, Turkey)
- Spouse: Ayşe Hümaşah Sultan (m. 1557)
- Children: View below
- Education: Enderun School

Military service
- Allegiance: Ottoman Empire
- Branch/service: Ottoman Army
- Years of service: 1518 – 1580
- Battles/wars: Ottoman–Venetian War (1570–73); Ottoman–Hungarian Wars; Russo-Crimean War (1571); Croatian-Ottoman Wars; Ottoman–Safavid War (1532–55); Ottoman–Safavid War (1578–90)

Semiz Ahmed Pasha (Ottoman Turkish: سيمز أحمد پاشا; 1492 – 27 April 1580) was an Ottoman statesman who served as Grand Vizier of the Ottoman Empire from 13 October 1579 until his death on 27 April 1580.

== Life ==
Semiz Ahmed Pasha was born in 1492, he was reported to have been of Albanian origin.

He succeeded Sokollu Mehmed Pasha as Grand Vizier of the Ottoman Empire on 13 October 1579.

== Marriage and issue ==
On 27 November 1557, Semiz Ahmed Pasha married Ayşe Hümaşah Sultan, daughter of Ottoman grand vizier Rüstem Pasha and Mihrimah Sultan, the only daughter of Suleiman the Magnificent and Hürrem Sultan.

They had ten children, five sons and five daughters.

=== Sons ===
- Sultanzade Mahmud Pasha (died 1602 buried in the Mihrimah Sultan Mosque) sanjak-bey of Kastamonu and Nakhchivan sanjak-bey of Şebinkarahisar;
- Sultanzade Mehmed Bey (died 1593), sanjak-bey of Herzegovina;
- Sultanzade Şehid Mustafa Pasha (died 1593), sanjak-bey of Klis;
- Sultanzade Osman Bey (died 1590/1591, buried in Mihrimah Sultan Mosque), sanjak-bey of Şebinkarahisar;
- Sultanzade Abdurrahman Bey, (died 1596/1597), buried in Mihrimah Sultan Mosque), married his niece Ayşe Hanım, daughter of his sister Saliha and Cığalazade Yusuf Sinan Pasha, and had a son, Semiz Mehmed Pasha;

=== Daughters ===
- Saliha Hanımsultan (1561–1580) married Cığalazade Yusuf Sinan Pasha in October 1576, where it was reported that Mihrimah Sultan spent 70,000 gold coins on the wedding. They had a son, Mahmud Pasha (who in 1612 married Hatice Sultan, daughter of Sultan Mehmed III), and a daughter, Ayşe Hanım (who married her maternal uncle Sultanzade Abdurrahman Bey and had a son, Semiz Mehmed Pasha).
- Safiye Hanımsultan, married Cığalazade Yusuf Sinan Pasha in March 1581 following her sister's death in 1580. They had two sons, Mehmed Bey and Hüseyin Bey, and a daughter.
- Hatice Hanımsultan, married Kapıcıbaşı Mahmud Bey in December 1584. Mahmud was initially supposed to marry Ayşe Sultan, granddaughter of his patroness Nurbanu Sultan, but after Nurbanu's death in 1583, the bride's mother, Safiye, married him to Hatice instead, so that he could marry her daughter to a candidate of her choice.
- Ayşe Hanımsultan
- Fatma Hanımsultan, married Yemenli Hasan Pasha in March 1596. She had two sons and a daughter.

== Death ==
Semiz Ahmed Pasha died on 27 April 1580 and was buried at Mihrimah Sultan Mosque, Edirnekapı.

Political offices
Preceded by Sokollu Mehmed Pasha	Grand Vizier of the Ottoman Empire; 13 October 1579 – 27 April 1580	Succeeded by Lala Mustafa Pasha
