= Mihrimah Sultan =

Mihrimah Sultan may refer to:

- Mihrimah Sultan (daughter of Suleiman I) (1522–1578), Ottoman princess
- Mihrimah Sultan (1547–1602), Ottoman princess, daughter of Şehzade Bayezid and granddaughter of Suleiman I
- Mihrimah Sultan (daughter of Murad III) (born c. 1578/1579), Ottoman princess
- Mihrimah Sultan (daughter of Mahmud II) (1812–1838), Ottoman princess
- Mihrimah Sultan (daughter of Şehzade Ziyaeddin) (1922–2000), Ottoman princess
