= Mihrimah Sultan (daughter of Murad III) =

Ottoman princess, daughter of Sultan Murad III

- Born: c. 1578/1579; Topkapi Palace, Constantinople, Ottoman Empire
- Died: after 1625; Constantinople, Ottoman Empire
- Burial: Murad III Mausoleum, Hagia Sophia, Istanbul
- Spouse: Mirahur Ahmed Pasha (m. 1600; died 1618) Çerkes Mehmed Pasha (m. 1618; died 1625)
- Dynasty: Ottoman
- Father: Murad III
- Mother: Safiye Sultan (disputed)
- Religion: Sunni Islam

Mihrimah Sultan (Ottoman Turkish: مهرماه سلطان; c. 1578/1579 – after 1625) was an Ottoman princess, daughter of Sultan Murad III (reign 1574–1595) and half-sister of Sultan Mehmed III (reign 1595–1603) of the Ottoman Empire.

== Birth ==
The Ottoman Register indicates that in 1595, when her father died, she was among his eldest daughters, which indicates that she may have been the daughter of Safiye Sultan. She was not born before 1578. It would also make sense if she was born shortly after the death of Mihrimah Sultan, a daughter of Suleiman the Magnificent, in whose honor she was named. If she was Safiye's daughter, she had at least three full brothers, Mehmed III, Şehzade Selim and Şehzade Mahmud, and three full sisters, Hümaşah Sultan, Ayşe Sultan and Fatma Sultan.

== Marriages ==
She married Mirahur Ahmed Pasha. After marriage, Mehmed III appointed him as governor of Mosul. During the reign of Ahmed I, Ahmed Pasha was appointed governor of Rumelia until 1614, and later governor of Damascus.

After Ahmed Pasha died in 1618, she married Çerkes Mehmed Ali Pasha, who replaced her husband as governor of Damascus in 1618, so it can be assumed that she was probably married to him in the same year after death of Ahmed Pasha.

In 1621, Mihrimah and her husband came to Istanbul as he was appointed as fourth vizier. During reign of Murad IV, he became Grand Vizier in 1624, until he died in Tokat on January 28, 1625. It is not known if she had issue from these marriages.

== Death ==
The further life of Mihrimah Sultan is not known, as well as whether she had more marriages. She died after 1625, probably during the reign of Murad IV, but this has not been confirmed. When she died, she was buried in the Mausoleum of Murad III, which is located in the courtyard of the Hagia Sophia.
