= Çerkes Mehmed Pasha =

Grand Vizier of the Ottoman Empire from 1624 to 1625

Çerkes Mehmed Ali Pasha

Grand Vizier of the Ottoman Empire
- In office 3 April 1624 – 28 January 1625
- Monarch: Murat IV
- Preceded by: Kemankeş Kara Ali Pasha
- Succeeded by: Hafız Ahmed Pasha

Personal details
- Born: c. 1557
- Died: 28 January 1625 (aged 67–68) Tokat (in modern Turkey)
- Spouse: Mihrimah Sultan (m. 1618)
- Education: Enderun School
- Origins: Circassian

Military service
- Rank: Silahdar

Çerkes Mehmed Ali Pasha (Adyghe: Мыхьмэд-Али Пащэ; c. 1557 – 28 January 1625) was an Ottoman statesman who served as Grand Vizier of the Ottoman Empire from 1624 to 1625.

Mehmed was of Circassian origins, hence his epithet. He was Educated in the Enderun School in Istanbul. At one point, he served as the armorer and bodyguard (Turkish: silahdar) of the sultan. He died of illness on 28 January 1625 in Tokat.

== See also ==
- List of Ottoman grand viziers

Political offices
Preceded by Kemankeş Kara Ali Pasha	Grand Vizier of the Ottoman Empire; 3 April 1624 – 28 January 1625	Succeeded by Hafız Ahmed Pasha
