= Kemankeş Kara Ali Pasha =

Grand Vizier of the Ottoman Empire from 1623 to 1624

Kemankeş Kara Ali Paşa (died 3 April 1624) was an Ottoman politician. He was the 80th grand vizier of the Ottoman Empire from 30 August 1623 to 3 April 1624 during the reign of Murad IV. He played an crucial role in the Ottoman–Safavid War (1623–1639). He was highly influential especially with the Janesaries.

== See also ==
- List of Ottoman grand viziers

Political offices
Preceded by Mere Hüseyin Pasha	Grand Vizier of the Ottoman Empire; 10 August 1623 – 3 April 1624	Succeeded by Çerkes Mehmed Pasha
