= Count Alexander of Montenegro =

Pretender to the Ottoman throne

- Born: 1585 (self claimed); Constantinople, Ottoman Empire (self claimed)
- Died: 1648 (aged 62–63); Kotor
- Burial: Kotor, Montenegro
- Spouse: Anna Caterina of Drisht
- Issue: Maurice; Elena
Names
- Count Alexander of Montenegro; Yahya bin Murad (self claimed)
- House: House of Osman (self claimed)
- Father: Murad III (self claimed)
- Mother: Safiye Sultan (self claimed)
- Religion: Orthodox, formerly Sunni Islam (claimed)

Count Alexander of Montenegro (1585? –1648), also known as Şehzade Yahya (sometimes spelled Jachia or Jahja), was an impostor and a self-claimed pretender to the Ottoman throne who claimed to be the son of Sultan Murad III.

== Biography ==
=== Background ===
According to Alexander's own writings, when his brother, Mehmed III, became Sultan, he followed the Ottoman custom of executing all of his brothers (potential rival claimants to the Ottoman throne). Yahya's mother Safiye was concerned that this could also eventually happen to him after the death of his father, so he was smuggled out of the empire, first to Greece, and then to present-day Bulgaria. He was then supposedly baptized at an Orthodox Christian monastery, where he lived for the next eight years of his life.

=== Battle for Ottoman throne ===
Alexander's narrative then claims that eventually, Alexander's two older brothers died, but in 1603, since Alexander had escaped the country to avoid fratricide, his nephew Ahmed I became the Ottoman sultan. Alexander believed that as the next oldest son of Murad III, he was next in line to be Ottoman Sultan and felt cheated out of his rightful destiny. He would dedicate the rest of his life to gaining the Ottoman throne. However, the standard Ottoman practice at the time for determining the succession was not birth order of sons; instead the Ottoman laws of succession to the throne stated that after the death of their father, the Ottoman princes would fight among themselves until one emerged triumphant.

From 1603 on, Alexander made frequent trips to northern and western Europe to gain support for his claim to the throne (visiting Florence, Madrid, Rome, Kraków, Antwerp, Prague, and other cities). At one point he managed to win the support of the Tatar Khan Shahin, and of the Cossacks as well. Between 1614 and 1617, he schemed with Serbian Orthodox Christian bishops in the Sanjak of Prizren and Western Roman Catholic bishops and leaders as part of his strategy to gain the Ottoman throne. A few years later, with the assistance of Russian and Ukrainian cossacks, he led a fleet of 130 ships and unsuccessfully attacked Constantinople. He died in 1648 or 1649 on the Montenegrin coast, where he was involved in a rebellion organized by the Roman Catholic bishops of Shkodër and Bar.

None of Alexander's statements regarding his identity or his temptative to conquest of the Ottoman throne are supported by historical evidence, and he currently receives no academic credence.

== Family ==
Alexander married an Albanian noblewoman named Anna Caterina of Drisht, the daughter of Duke Peter, Count of Drisht, in the early 1630s, when Yahya started calling himself Duke of that region. Anna Caterina was supposedly descended from the national Albanian hero Skanderbeg. They had two children, a son and a daughter:

- Maurice of Drisht (1635 - 1693). Born in Turin and died in Palmanova as captain of Venice. He married Eleonora Romano of Gorizia and had two daughters:
  - Maria Anna of Drisht (1674 - 14 August 1694). Born in Palmanova, dead in Udine.
  - Elena of Drisht (4 August 1675 - 29 August 1727). Born in Palmanova, dead in Udine. She married Lucrezio Treo of Udine.
- Elena of Drisht (1638 - 1697). Born in Turin. In 1658 she married the pisan noble Andrea Biagi and had two children:
  - Caterina Biagi. She married Ottaviano Alasio of Pisa.
  - Vincenzo Biagi. Unmarried and without issue, he was captain under the King of Spain.

== In popular culture ==
- Berk Cankat portrayed Count Alexander in the Turkish TV series Muhteşem Yüzyıl: Kösem, though the character was drastically altered in the series.
  - He was not a European count but rather a prince named Yahya, the long-lost son of Sayfie Sultan and Murad III. In an attempt to save him from being executed by the new Sultan Mehmed III (who had all potential rival claimants killed), Safiye Sultan had the baby Şehazde Yahya sneak out of the palace. He was given the name Alexander (Alex for short). He became a janissary to find his family and fell in love with Kösem Sultan before she entered the Harem of Ahmed I in the process—she did not reciprocate his feelings, leaving him hurt throughout the series. After converting to Islam from Christianity, he took on the name Iskender and later went on to become the leader of the raiders before his eventual position as an agha. When he learned of his true royal heritage, he tried to usurp the throne from Kösem Sultan's sons under Safiye's persuasion and the twist of fate. As a result, Kosem had him killed in a ship explosion.

== Sources ==
- Ostapchuk, Victor (1989). The Ottoman Black Sea Frontier and the Relations of the Porte with the Polish-Lithuanian Commonwealth and Muscovy: 1622-1628. Harvard University. p. 92.
- Королёв В. Н. (2007). Босфорская война (in Russian). М.: Вече. ISBN 978-5-9533-2099-3. Archived from the original on 2017-08-08.
- Усенко О. Г. (2006). Ототоманус, или сын турецкого султана. Limba Română: Revistă Trimestrială (magazine) (in Russian) (6) (Родина ed.): 45–52. ISSN 0235-7089.
- Faroqhi S. (2005). The Ottoman Empire and the World around it. I. B. Tauris. ISBN 978-0-857-73023-7.
- Benzoni G. (2004). Alberto M. Ghisalberti (ed.). "JACHIA" (Dizionario Biografico degli Italiani) (in Italian). 61. Roma: Istituto della Enciclopedia Italiana.
- Catualdi Vittorio (= Oscarre de Hassek) (1889). Sultan Jahja dell'imperial casa ottomana od altrimenti Alessandro conte di Montenegro ed i suoi discendenti in Italia: Nuovi contributi alla storia della questione orientale (in Italian). Trieste: G. Chiopris., reprinted in 2013 by BiblioLifeISBN 1295371448
- Giammanco A.D. (2015). "(Self) Fashioning of an Ottoman Christian Prince: Jachia ibn Mehmed in confessional diplomacy of the early seventeenth century" (MA thesis in comparative history) (Central European University ed.).
- Levinsk. A. (1890). "Un adventurier turk au XVII ciecle (Sultan Yahya autrement dit le comte Alexandre de Montenegro)" (Revue bleue: politique et littéraire) (in French). XLV(1): 393–400, 435–442.
- Malcolm N. (2002). Kosovo: A Short History. Pan. ISBN 0330412248.
- Peirce, Leslie P. (1993). The Imperial Harem: Women and Sovereignty in the Ottoman Empire. Oxford: Oxford University Press. ISBN 0195086775.
- Setton, Kenneth Meyer (1991). Venice, Austria, and the Turks in the Seventeenth Century. Philadelphia: The American Philosophical Society. ISBN 0-87169-192-2.
- Dorothy M. Vaughan, Europe and the Turk: A Pattern of Alliances, 1350-1700, Liverpool, 1954, pp. 220–236
