= Semiz Mehmed Pasha =

Grand Vizier of the Ottoman Empire from 1644 to 1645

Sultanzade Semiz Mehmed Pasha

Grand Vizier of the Ottoman Empire
- In office 31 January 1644 – 17 December 1645
- Monarch: Ibrahim
- Preceded by: Kemankeş Kara Mustafa Pasha
- Succeeded by: Nevesinli Salih Pasha

Ottoman Governor of Egypt
- In office 1637–1640
- Preceded by: Gazi Hüseyin Pasha
- Succeeded by: Nakkaş Mustafa Pasha

Personal details
- Born: 1596
- Died: July 1646 (aged 50)
- Dynasty: House of Osman
- Father: Sultanzade Abdurrahman Bey
- Mother: Ayşe Hanım

Sultanzade Semiz Mehmed Pasha (1596 – July 1646) was an Ottoman grand vizier and a great-great-grandson of Suleiman the Magnificent.

== Biography ==
He was born in 1596. His father, Sultanzade Abdurrahman Bey, was a son of Ayşe Hümaşah Sultan, daughter of Rustem Pasha and Mihrimah Sultan. His mother was Ayşe Hanım, daughter of Saliha Hanımsultan, sister of Abdurrahman, and Cığalazade Yusuf Sinan Pasha. He was a great-great-grandson of Suleiman the Magnificent and Hurrem Sultan. For this, he was nicknamed Sultanzade (lit. Sultan's descendant), although he had not eligible to use that title, since it was reserved for the sons of the Sultan's daughters or the sons of the Şehzade princes' daughters.

== Early years ==
In 1637, he was appointed as the governor of Egypt. Three years later, during the reign of Ibrahim, he returned to Istanbul as a vizier in the Ottoman divan. In 1641, he was appointed as the governor of Özü (modern Ochakiv in Ukraine) and tasked with capturing the fort of Azak (modern Azov in Russia), which had recently been lost to the Cossacks. He was successful in recapturing the fort. In 1643, he was appointed as the governor of Damascus (in modern Syria). This appointment was probably due to the secret power struggle between him and the grand vizier, Kemankeş Mustafa Pasha.

== Grand Vizier ==
In 1644, he succeeded the grand vizier Kemankeş Mustafa Pasha, who was executed. Kemankeş Mustafa Pasha was a victim of palace intrigues and a hodja quack named Djindji Khodja. Well aware of the hodja's influence on the sultan and the tragedy of the previous grand vizier, he was too cautious in governance and became an ineffective grand vizier. He became a yes man of the sultan. According to Lord Kinross, one day the sultan asked why he never opposed any opinion, to which he replied, "Every opinion of the sultan has a deep aphorism even if subjects are unable to understand." Although he was against declaring war on the Republic of Venice, his cautious objections were not taken into consideration and the Cretan War (1645–1669) soon began in 1645, which was financially disastrous to both sides.

== Later years ==
Sultan Ibrahim deposed him in 1645 and sent him to Crete, the theatre of the recently started war, as the commander of the army (Turkish: serdar). Shortly thereafter he died of natural causes.

== See also ==
- List of Ottoman grand viziers
- Sultanzade

| Preceded by Kemankeş Mustafa Pasha | Grand Vizier; 31 January 1644 – 17 December 1645 | Succeeded by Nevesinli Salih Pasha |
