= Fatma Sultan (daughter of Murad III) =

Ottoman princess, daughter of Sultan Murad III

- Born: c. 1573; Manisa, Ottoman Empire
- Died: c. 1620 (aged 46–47); Constantinople, Ottoman Empire
- Burial: Murad III Mausoleum, Hagia Sophia Mosque, Istanbul
- Spouse: Boşnak Halil Pasha (m. 1593; died 1603) Cafer Pasha (m. 1604; died 1609) Hızır Pasha (m. 1610; died 1610)
- Issue: First marriage; Sultanzade Mahmud Bey; Sultanzade Hasan Bey
- Dynasty: Ottoman
- Father: Murad III
- Mother: Safiye Sultan
- Religion: Sunni Islam

Fatma Sultan (Ottoman Turkish: فاطمه سلطان; c. 1573 – c. 1620) was an Ottoman princess, daughter of Sultan Murad III (reign 1574–1595) and Safiye Sultan, and a sister of Sultan Mehmed III (reign 1595–1603) of the Ottoman Empire.

== Early life ==
Fatma Sultan was a daughter of Sultan Murad III, and his consort Safiye Sultan. She had three full brothers, Sultan Mehmed III, Şehzade Selim and Şehzade Mahmud, and two full sisters, Ayşe Sultan and Hümaşah Sultan.

== Marriages ==
On 6 December 1593, Fatma, at Murad's behest, married Halil Pasha, Admiral of the Fleet. The wedding took place at the Old Palace, and was celebrated in a seven-day ceremony. The historian Mustafa Selaniki described the excitement of the crowds who turned out to watch the elaborate processional that carried Fatma, who was concealed behind a screen of red satin, to the palace of her husband. Selaniki wrote that at the wedding of Fatma "skirtfulls of shiny new coins were distributed... those who did not receive any sighed with longing." According to the historian Hoca Sadeddin Efendi, her dowry was 300,000 ducats. As part of the celebrations, the members of the Imperial Council were given a seven-day leave.

In 1595, Halil Pasha did not sail with the fleet. This was particularly because neither Safiye nor Fatma were willing to let him leave Istanbul. Their reluctance probably stemmed from the fact that Fatma was pregnant. She gave birth to a son in October 1595, which strengthened the affection of the new Sultan Mehmed and Safiye for Halil Pasha.

After Halil Pasha's death in 1603, Safiye married Cafer Pasha in December 1604. He was then in charge of securing the passes on the Danube. In order to consummate his marriage, Cafer Pasha was immediately called back to the capital and given a seat on the imperial council with the rank of full vizier. Cafer Pasha became governor of Cyprus in 1608, where Fatma probably followed him. He stayed on this position until his death.

There are sources that state that Fatma was married two more times. After the death of Cafer Pasha, she married in 1610 Hizir Pasha, governor of Van 1582, Karaman, and Tamashvar 1592, who was very old and died shortly after the wedding.

== Death and legacy ==
When Fatma died in 1620, she was buried in her father's mausoleum, located in the courtyard of the Hagia Sophia Mosque, Istanbul, and was recorded, among other things, as Halil Pasha's wife.

She owned a translation of "The Ascension of Propitious Stars and Sources of Sovereignty" (Matali' us-sa'ade ve menabi' us-siyade).

In 1582, Nakkaş Osman Pasha is known to have illustrated a horoscope book for Fatma Sultan. This manuscript, in which Nakkaş Osman is named as the illustrator, is in the Bibliothèque Nationale in Paris.

== Issue ==
By her first marriage, Fatma Sultan had two sons:

- Sultanzade Mahmud Bey (October 1595 – 1598)
- Sultanzade Hasan Bey (fl. 1604 – c. 1620)

== Sources ==
- Peirce, Leslie P. (1993). The Imperial Harem: Women and Sovereignty in the Ottoman Empire. Oxford University Press. ISBN 978-0-195-08677-5.
- Uluçay, Mustafa Çağatay (2011). Padişahların kadınları ve kızları. Ankara: Ötüken. ISBN 978-9-754-37840-5.
