= Safiye Sultan (mother of Mehmed III) =

Valide Sultan of the Ottoman Empire

- Valide Sultan
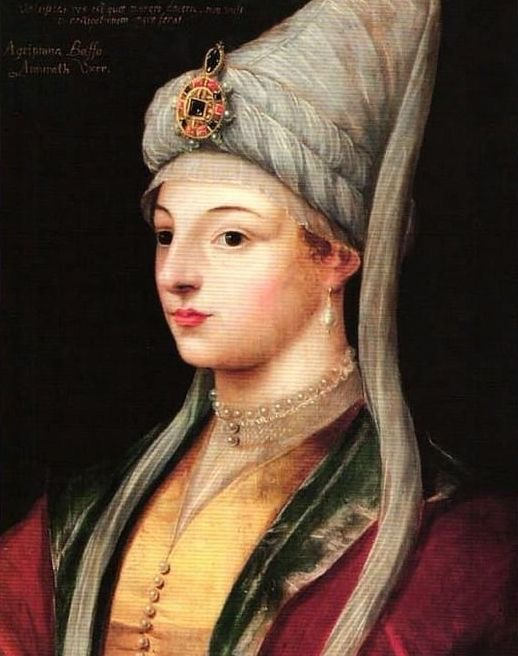

Valide Sultan of the Ottoman Empire (Empress Mother)
- Tenure: 16 January 1595 – 22 December 1603
- Predecessor: Nurbanu Sultan
- Successor: Handan Sultan

Haseki Sultan of the Ottoman Empire (Chief Consort)
- Tenure: 27 December 1574 – 16 January 1595
- Predecessor: Nurbanu Sultan
- Successor: Kösem Sultan
- Born: c. 1550; Dukagjin Highlands, Ottoman Empire (now Albania) or Corfu, Republic of Venice
- Died: January/April 1619 (aged 68–69); Old Palace, Constantinople, Ottoman Empire
- Burial: Mausoleum of Murad III, Hagia Sophia, Istanbul
- Consort of: Murad III
- Issue: Hümaşah Sultan; Ayşe Sultan; Mehmed III; Şehzade Mahmud; Şehzade Selim; Fatma Sultan; Mihrimah Sultan (?)
Names
- Turkish: Safiye Sultan; Ottoman Turkish: سلطان صفیه
- House: Ottoman
- Religion: Islam, previously Roman Catholicism

Safiye Sultan (Ottoman Turkish: صفیه سلطان; c. 1550 – January/April 1619) was the favourite concubine of Ottoman sultan Murad III, and the mother of Mehmed III. She was one of the eminent figures during the era known as the Sultanate of Women. She lived in the Ottoman Empire as a courtier during the reigns of seven sultans: Suleiman the Magnificent, Selim II, Murad III, Mehmed III, Ahmed I, Mustafa I and Osman II.

After the death of Selim II in 1574, Murad took the throne as the new sultan in Constantinople. Safiye was by his side and moved with him to Topkapi Palace; less than a year into his reign she received the title of haseki sultan and was given a higher rank than the sultan's own sisters. Nurbanu Sultan, Murad's mother, was unhappy with Safiye's influence on her son, and wanted to replace her with other concubines from the harem. Safiye even led a faction in the court between 1577 and 1580 in opposition to her mother-in-law and her faction, with the support of Murad's cousins Ayşe Hümaşah Sultan and Hümaşah Sultan. The struggle of the two women to gain control over the sultan's life, his decisions and the government increased in 1579, as the death of the powerful grand vizier Sokollu Mehmed Pasha along with the sultan self-isolating himself, opened the door to the exercise of power for anyone who was close to the sultan. The conflict between Safiye and Nurbanu reached a crisis point in 1580, and Murad sent Safiye in exile to the Old Palace. She lived there for some years before Nurbanu's death, but Murad brought her back sometime after his mother's death in December 1583.

Without Nurbanu, she became the most powerful woman in the harem. Moreover, she was not contented with her position, and began to intervene in politics, ultimately becoming one of the most powerful figures of Murad's reign, and directing her network on a larger scale to once again influence state affairs. She strengthened her position in the court when she became the valide sultan upon the ascension of her son Mehmed III in 1595, after Murad's death. As valide sultan, her personal purse was three times that of the sultan, the highest level of salary for a person in the empire. During his reign, Mehmed consulted her on important matters and did not make decisions without consent.

Safiye Sultan did not only interfere in internal affairs but also in foreign affairs of the empire. It is known that she corresponded with foreign kings and queens (the most known of them being Elizabeth I of England) and established diplomatic relations with them. Like her mother-in-law Nurbanu, she supported a pro-Venetian policy.

In the last years of her son's reign, her meddling in state affairs caused three destructive rebellions and made her immensely disliked by the soldiers and the people. However, until the end of her son's reign, no one could break her dominance over the government. Upon the death of Mehmed III in 1603, she was sent to the Old Palace on 9 January 1604 by her grandson and new sultan Ahmed I, and lived there in retirement without political influence or returning to the court until her death. She died in 1619 and was laid to rest in the tomb of Murad III in Hagia Sophia.

== Background ==
According to the reports of the Venetian bailos Morosini (1585) and Lorenzo Bernardo (1592), she was of Albanian origin. This information was later confirmed by Lazzaro Soranzo (1598), who specified that she came from the village of "Rezi" (possibly modern-day Kriezi) in the Dukagjin Highlands. However, other contemporary sources attributed different origins to her: Stephan Gerlach described her as Moldavian in 1575 and Bosnian in 1576; the Venetian bailo Antonio Tiepolo identified her as a Slav in 1576; and the bailo Zane referred to her as Circassian in 1594.She is also often erroneously claimed to have been from the Venetian Baffo family. Modern academic scholars usually describe her as of Albanian descent.

In 1563, at the age of circa thirteen, she was gifted as a slave by Hümaşah Sultan, daughter of Şehzade Mehmed. Given the name Safiye, she became a concubine of Şehzade Murad, the eldest son of Şehzade Selim. On 26 May 1566, after two daughters, she gave birth to Murad's first son, Mehmed. The same year, Suleiman the Magnificent died and Selim ascended the throne as Selim II.

== Haseki Sultan ==
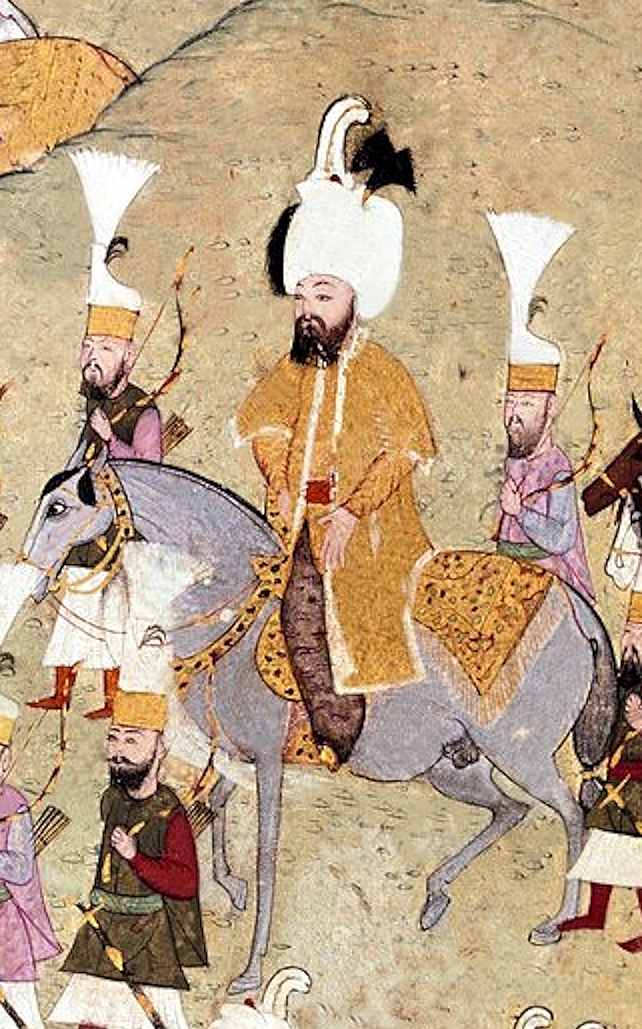
The Ottoman Sultan Murad III

Selim died in 1574 and Murad became the new sultan as Murad III. Safiye and her children immediately traveled to the capital to settle next to Murad. Safiye immediately received the Haseki rank and a salary of 800 aspers per day. However, her new life in Constantinople also meant that Nurbanu Sultan, Murad's mother, who was deeply loved and revered by him, would be a part of their private daily lives. Nurbanu, as the Valide and head of the harem, ruled over the entire palace and family, and Safiye lived as Haseki under Nurbanu's shadow. For the first few years, even if there were tensions in the harem, there was no open fight between the two women. However, Safiye sought to gain political power, which was a completely logical move as the mother of princes. However, Nurbanu did not appreciate Safiye's aspirations in political life, nor her attempt to influence Murad; Nurbanu saw Safiye as a threat to her influence over the family and Murad. At that time, Murad, being isolated in the harem, and also because of his commitment to his mother and love for his wife, allowed them to rule over him, and he depended on them.

Safiye had been Murad's only concubine before his accession, and he continued having a monogamous relationship with her for several years into his sultanate. Nurbanu advised him to take other concubines for the good of the dynasty, which by 1580 had only one surviving heir: Mehmed, Murad's son by Safiye. In 1580, Nurbanu accused Safiye of using witches and sorcerers to render Murad impotent and prevent him from taking new concubines. This resulted in the imprisonment, exile, torture and execution of Safiye's close friends and servants. His sense of masculinity also wounded, Murad – who tended to believe in witchcraft and astrology, so presumably seriously believed the rumor – finally, in 1580, banished Safiye to the Eski Saray (Old Palace). Murad's sister Ismihan presented him with two beautiful concubines, which he accepted. Cured of his impotence, he went on to father more than fifty children, although according to some sources the total, including children who died as infants, could exceed one hundred.

Venetian reports state that after an initial bitterness, Safiye kept her dignity and showed no jealousy of Murad's concubines. She even procured more for him, earning the gratitude of the Sultan, who continued to value her and consult her on political matters, especially after the death of Nurbanu.

After Nurbanu's death in December 1583 and her return to Topkapi Palace, by then, Safiye had perhaps been disillusioned with Murad and was only interested in gaining power. As Giovanni Moro reported in 1590: with the authority she {Safiye} enjoys as mother of the prince, she intervenes on occasion in affairs of state, although she is much respected in this, and is listened to by His Majesty who considers her sensible and wise. It was during this period that Safiye also built her own all-intertwined relationship system and began to immerse herself in every corner of politics. With the support of the chief eunuch, Gazanfer Agha, she influenced Murad's decisions more and gained more power, which made some Grand Viziers very uncomfortable. Of course, Koca Sinan Pasha, who is also Albanian, was Grand Vizier for three terms during Murad's reign, was her biggest supporter.

As much as Safiye could hate Murad's mother, she continued Nurbanu's pro-Venice policy under the influence of Beatrice Michiel, Chirana and Esther Handali versus the anti-Venice Esperanza Malchi. She also stood openly in front of Murad for the sake of Venice interests as Haseki. Although she was able to influence the sultan in many ways, she did not always manage to shape the events according to her own taste. For example, in 1593, she tried to convince Murad in favor of the English ambassador she had favored. However, Murad hardly listened, already rejecting Safiye's offer. Thus, although her power and influence grew during Murad's reign and she managed to achieve many of her interests and goals, the Sultan also set serious boundaries for her.

=== The question of marriage ===
Safiye arrived at the Istanbul palace as a Başhaseki (chief favourite) and during 32 years of their marriage with Murad, she remained his only woman for 20 of them. Selyaniqi called Safiye «the glorified and respected legal wife Safiye Hatun», from which we can conclude that Murad III granted her freedom and entered into a nikah. Pedani pointed out that foreign sources did not report this marriage until 1585. Moreover, the bailo Giovan Francesco Morosini responded to a question from the Venetian Senate in 1585 that Murad III did not marry his Haseki, although he granted her exceptional privileges. However, Pedani noted that Morosini left Istanbul that year, and rumors of the Sultan's marriage began to spread after his departure. Another ambassador, Lorenzo Bernardo, received information from kira Esther Handali in October 1585 that the wedding of Safiye and Murad's daughter Ayşe Sultan was being prepared with the vizier İbrahim Pasha and that Safiye wished to marry at the same time. On December 11, it was decided that the double wedding celebrations would be timed to coincide with the spring festival of Navruz. At the same time, the bailo sent information to Venice and received generous gifts for the Sultan and sultana. On December 24, Safiye Sultan sent a reply thanking Venice for the gifts and for the fact that «the Venetian gentlemen share her joy.» The Venetian Senate immediately sent a letter of congratulations on the occasion of the wedding.

However, Peirce noted that «Solomon the Jew», who prepared a report for the English envoy at the time of Murad III death, wrote that the Sultan had not married Safiye because «some bitter enemy of his mother advised him not to do so, otherwise he would not live long after the marriage, as his father had done». Akyıldız also believed that the marriage was never consummated, especially if foreign sources are taken into account. Ottoman scholar Anthony Alderson also refuted the information about this marriage, pointing out that after 1520, the Ottoman sultans entered into only three official marriages, and the union of Murad III and Safiye was not among them.

At the same time, Peirce, referring to the Genoese sailor Giovanni Antonio Menavino, captured by the Turks, wrote that from the end of the 15th century, the Ottoman sultans did not enter into legal marriages, although they could in fact marry during their tenure as Şehzade.

== Valide Sultan ==
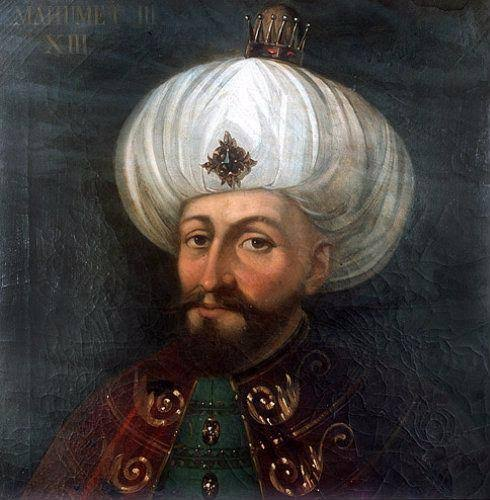
Ottoman Sultan Mehmed III, to whom Safiye was a Valide Sultan during 1595–1603.

When Murad died in 1595, Safiye arranged for her son Mehmed to succeed as a sultan, and she became the Valide Sultan—one of the most powerful in Ottoman history. She became more active in internal and foreign affairs due to her son being committed to her to the extreme, the new sultan essentially allowed his mother to rule and gain influence, one instance being, she was responsible for suspending the drowning in the Bosphorous as a punishment for adulterous women. Until her son's death in 1603, Ottoman politics were determined by a party headed by herself and Gazanfer Ağa, chief of the white eunuchs and head of the enderun (the imperial inner palace). She had to handle serious internal struggles and struggles with the army instead of her son. She gave money for the war expenses from her personal account to support her son.

People and civil servants directly appealed to her when they needed help, since they knew how influential she was within the Ottoman court; sometimes they would even throw themselves in front of her carriage for help. She was the most influential in directing everything related to the empire and the terms of appointments and dismissals of everyone in the Empire, even the Grand Vizier and Shaykh al-Islam. When Mehmed III went on the campaign of Eger in 1596, he left a treasure of one billion akçe to her service, and he gave her the power to audit important matters in his absence. She distributed alms to the poor, orphans, and widows upon the fall of Eger Castle.

Safiye arranged the highest allowance ever for herself as Valide Sultan. She eventually enjoyed an enormous stipend of 3,000 aspers a day during the latter part of her son's reign. When Mehmed III went on the Eger campaign in Hungary in 1596, he gave his mother great power over the empire, leaving her in charge of the treasury. During her interim rule she persuaded her son to revoke a political appointment of the judgeship of Constantinople and to reassign to the grand vizierate to Damat Ibrahim Pasha, her son-in-law. So no one could do anything in the capital, or even in the whole empire, without Safiye's permission. She during the 9-year reign of her son has even been accused of corruption in his government and of selling important and lucrative positions at the highest price offered.

During this period, the secretary of the English ambassador reported that while in the palace, Safiye "spied a number of boats upon the river [the Bosphorus] hurrying together. The Queen Mother sent to enquire of the matter [and] was told that the Vizier did justice upon certain chabies [kahpe], that is, whores. She, taking displeasure, sent word and advised [the Vizier] that her son had left him to govern the city and not to devour the women; [thus] commanding him to look well to the other business and not to meddle any more with the women till his master's return."

The greatest crisis Safiye endured as a valide sultan stemmed from her reliance on her kira, Esperanza Malchi. A kira was a non-Muslim woman (typically Jewish) who acted as an intermediary between a secluded woman of the harem and the outside world, serving as a business agent and secretary. Malchi reportedly attempted to influence Safiye (and through her the sultan) negatively in their policy toward the Republic of Venice in conflict with the Venetian spy Beatrice Michiel, which on at least one occasion caused an open conflict at court. In 1600, the imperial cavalry rose in rebellion at the influence of Malchi and her son, who had amassed over 50 million aspers in wealth. Safiye was held responsible for this, along with the debased currency the troops were paid with, and nearly suffered the wrath of the soldiers, who brutally killed Malchi and her son. Mehmed III was forced to say "he would counsel his mother and correct his servants." To prevent the soldiers from suspecting her influence over the Sultan, Safiye persuaded Mehmed to have his decrees written out by the Grand Vizier, instead of personally signing them.

But even for a short period of several weeks in 1600, even the Sultan saw his mother's influence on him and her presence in the palace as disturbing and insisted that she leave the palace and no longer control his affairs. However, she had built extensive support network, and continued to exert a tacit influence over the state through one of the chief eunuchs, appointing her allies to powerful positions. After five weeks, the Sultan canceled his mother's exile and brought her back to his palace and placed her in the inner circle of advisors, who actually ran the government.

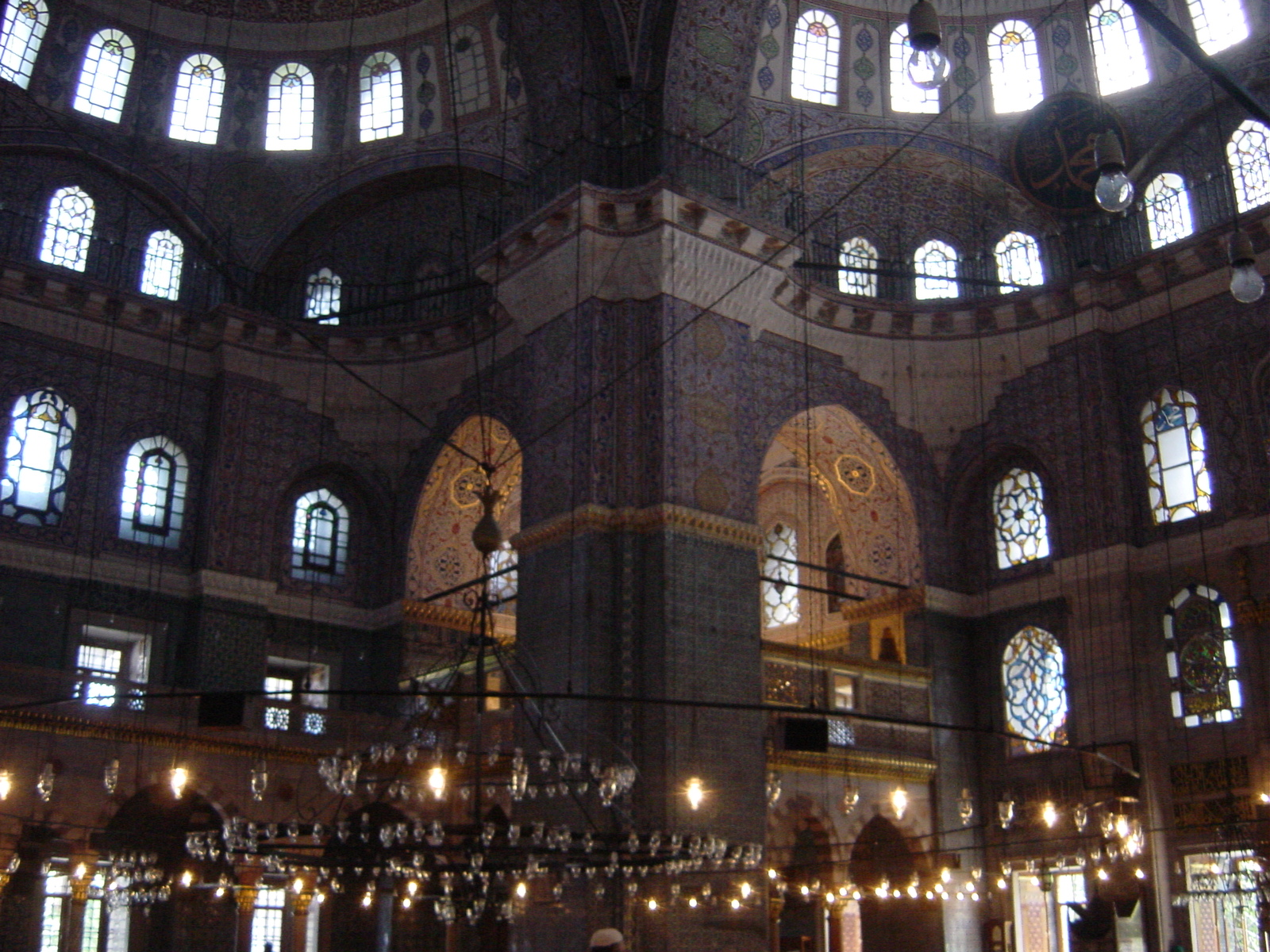
Interior design of Yeni Mosque in Eminönü, Istanbul. The construction began during Safiye's regency.

Safiye was instrumental in the execution of her grandson Mahmud in 1603, having intercepted a message sent to his mother by a religious seer, who predicted that Mehmed III would die in six months and be succeeded by his son. According to the English ambassador, Mahmud was distressed at "how his father was altogether led by the old Sultana his Grandmother and the state went to Ruin, she respecting nothing but her own desire to get money, and often lamented thereof to his mother," who was "not favored of the Queen mother." The prince was therefore a serious threat to her and her son's reign. The sultan, provoked by her, suspecting a plot and jealous of his son's popularity, had him strangled.

Mehmed III was succeeded by his son Ahmed I in 1603. One of his first major decisions was to deprive his grandmother of power—she was banished to the Old Palace on Friday, 9 January 1604. This was the end of her reign, which lasted for 19 years through her husband and son. When Ahmed I's brother Mustafa I became sultan in 1617, his mother Halime Sultan received 3,000 aspers as valide sultan although her mother-in-law Safiye was still alive. However, Halime received only 2,000 aspers during her retirement to the Old Palace between her son's two reigns; during the first months of her retirement Safiye was still alive, perhaps a neighbor in the Old Palace, receiving 3,000 aspers a day while the Haseki Sultan of Ahmed I, Kösem Sultan also living in the Old Palace, received 1,000 aspers a day.

All succeeding sultans were descended from Safiye.

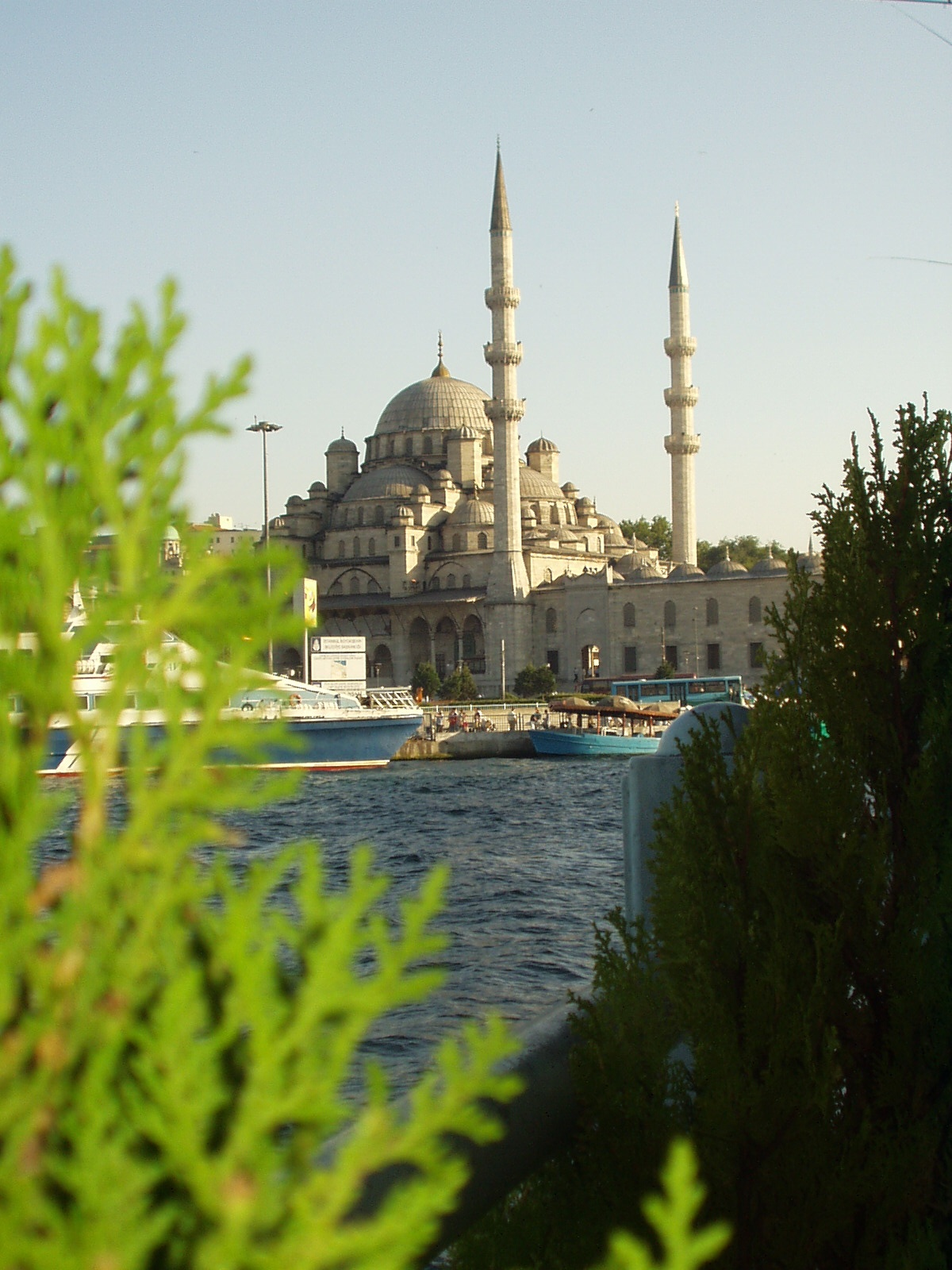
The Yeni Mosque in Eminönü, Istanbul. Construction was begun by Safiye Sultan and completed during the regency of Turhan Hatice, the mother of Mehmed IV.

== Foreign relations ==
Safiye, like Nurbanu, advocated a generally pro-Venetian policy and regularly interceded on behalf of the Venetian ambassadors, one of whom described her to the senate as "a woman of her word, trustworthy, and I call say that in her alone have I found truth in Constantinople; therefore it will always benefit Your Serenity to promote her gratitude."

Safiye also maintained good relations with England. She persuaded Mehmed III to let the English ambassador accompany him on campaign in Hungary. One unique aspect of her career is that she corresponded personally with Queen Elizabeth I of England, volunteering to petition the Sultan on Elizabeth's behalf. The two women also exchanged gifts. On one occasion, Safiye received a portrait of Elizabeth in exchange for "two garments of cloth of silver, one girdle of cloth of silver, [and] two handkerchiefs wrought with massy gold." In a letter from 1599, Safiye responds to Elizabeth's request for good relations between the empires:

I have received your letter...God-willing, I will take action in accordance with what you have written. Be of good heart in this respect. I constantly admonish my son, the Padishah, to act according to the treaty. I do not neglect to speak to him in this manner. God-willing, may you not suffer grief in this respect. May you too always be firm in friendship. God-willing, may [our friendship] never die. You have sent me a carriage and it has been delivered. I accept it with pleasure. And I have sent you a robe, a sash, two large gold-embroidered bath towels, three handkerchiefs, and a ruby and pearl tiara. May you excuse [the unworthiness of the gifts].

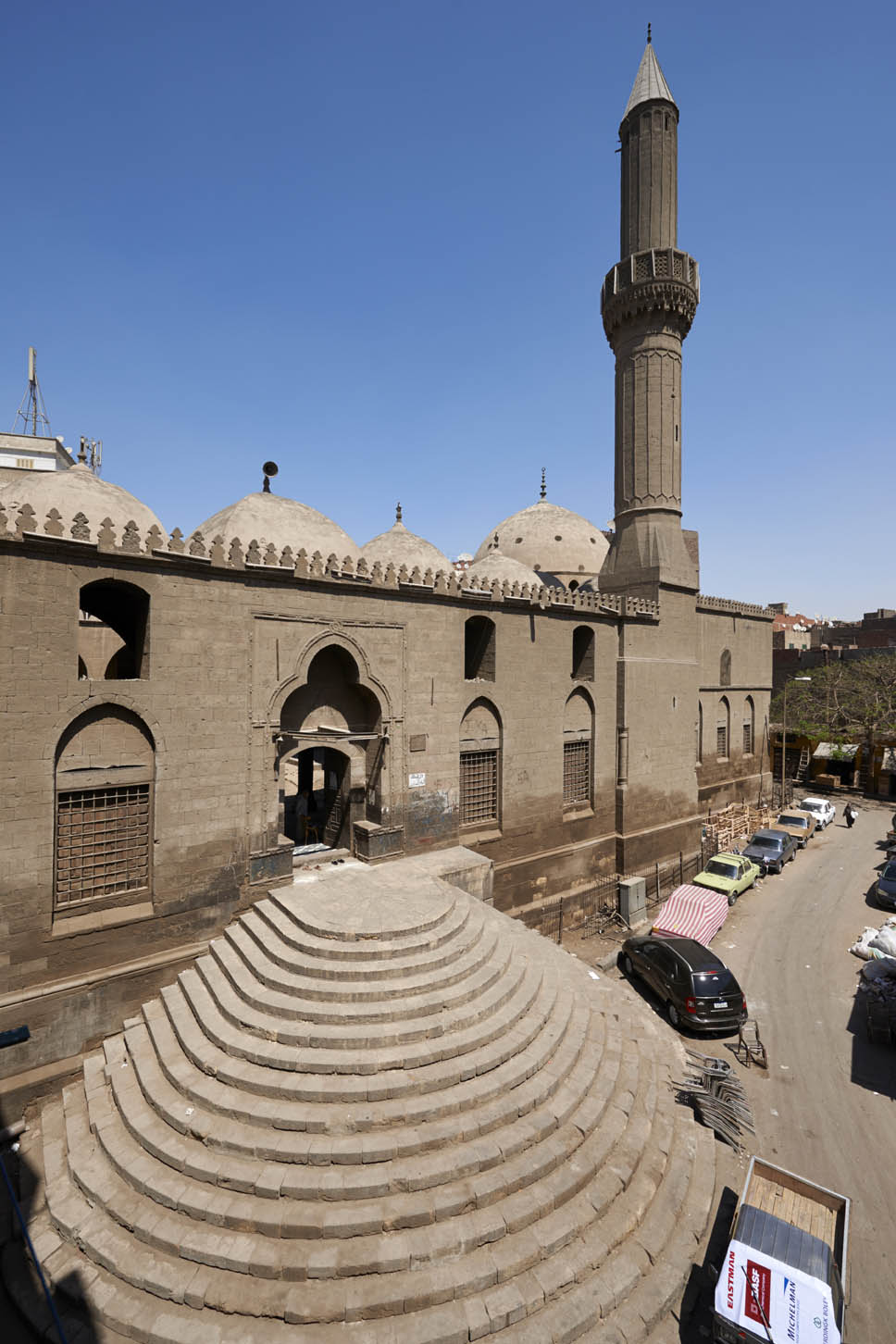
Al-Malika Safiyya Mosque, Cairo (Exterior view)

Safiye had the carriage covered and used it on excursions to town, which was considered scandalous. This exchange of letters and gifts between Safiye and Elizabeth presented an interesting gender dynamic to their political relationship. In juxtaposition to the traditional means of exchanging women in order to secure diplomatic, economic, or military alliances, Elizabeth and Safiye's exchange put them in the position of power rather than the objects of exchange.

An unusual occurrence in Safiye's relationship with England was her attraction to Sir Paul Pindar, secretary to English ambassador and deliverer of Elizabeth's coach. According to Thomas Dallam (who presented Elizabeth's gift of an organ to Mehmed III), "the sultana did take a great liking to Mr. Pinder, and afterward, she sent for him to have his private company, but their meeting was crossed."

== Public works ==
Safiye is also famous for starting the construction of Yeni Mosque, the "new mosque" in Eminönü, Constantinople, in 1597. The complex consisted of the mosque itself, a hospital, primary school, and pagalpan palace. Part of Constantinople's Jewish quarter was razed to make way for the structure, whose massive building costs made Safiye unpopular with the soldiery, who wanted her exiled. At one point Mehmed III temporarily sent her to the Old Palace. Though she returned, she did not live to see the mosque completed. After Mehmed died, Safiye lost power and was permanently exiled to the Old Palace by Sultan Ahmed I. The mosque's construction was halted for decades. It was finally completed in 1665 by another valide sultan, Turhan Hatice, mother of Mehmed IV.

=== Masjid al-Malika Safiyya ===
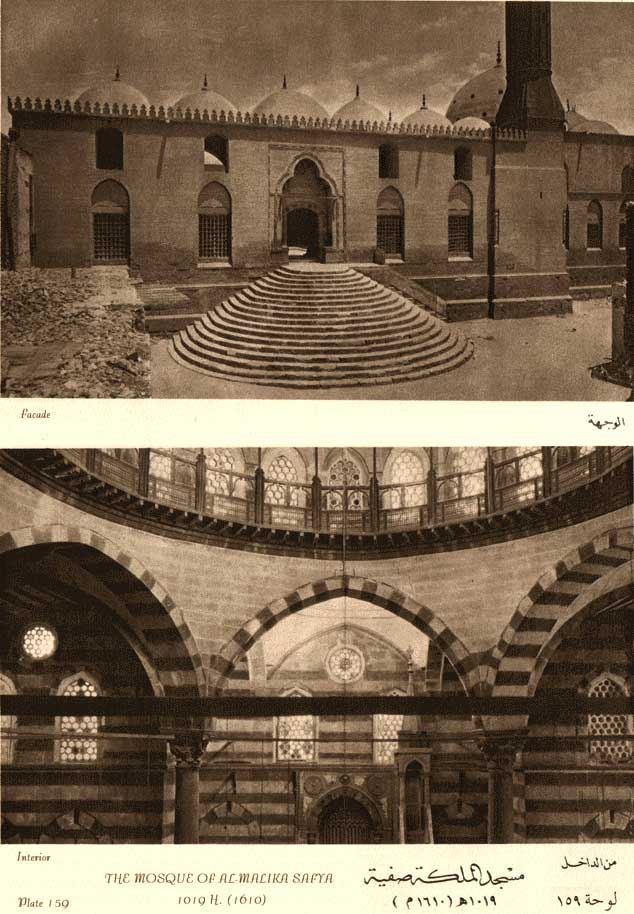
Masjid al-Malika Safiyya, Egypt. (Interior view)

The Al-Malika Safiye Mosque in Cairo is named in Safiye's honor. The mosque of al-Malika Safiyya derives its name more by taking over the uncompleted mosque more than by real patronage. It was started by Uthman Agha, who held the post of the Agha Dar al-Sa'ada, who was in charge of the harem, as well as the post of being the Egyptian waqf estates of the holy places in the Hijaz. He was also the agent and slave of the Safiye Sultan. But, he died before the mosque was completed, and it went to Safiya as part of her estate. She endowed the mosque with a deed that provided for thirty-nine custodians including a general supervisor, a preacher, the khatib (orator), two imams, timekeeper, an incense burner, a repairman, and a gardener.

== Death ==
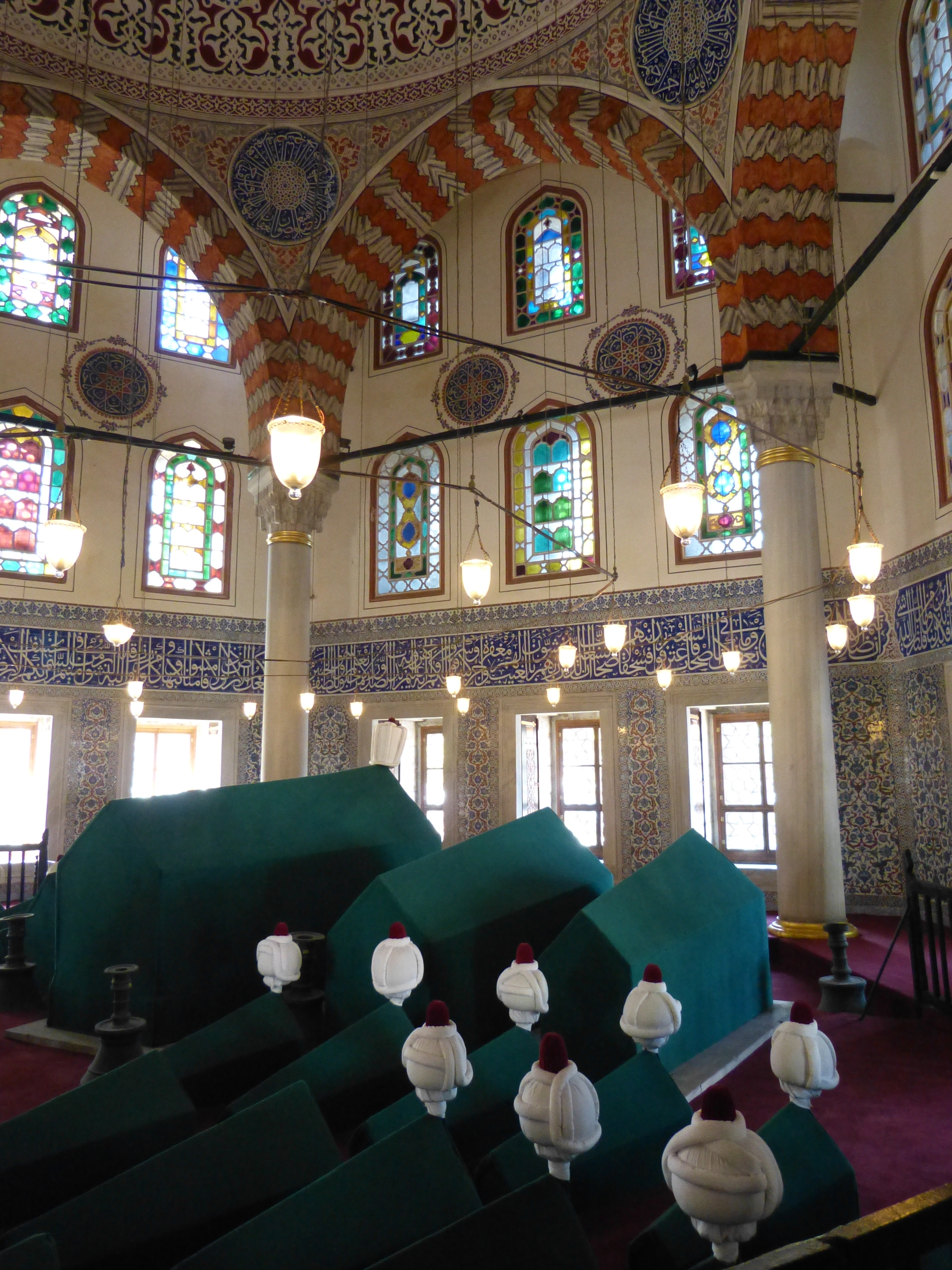
Safiye is buried next to her husband Murad III in the Mausoleum of Murad III

Safiye Sultan died between January and April 1619 in the Old Palace. According to Venetian report dated January 1619 says the following:

"The Sultana great-grandmother of this king has died. She was mother to Sultan Mehmet and grandmother to Sultan Ahmet. She was a woman of high spirits who wanted to take part in the government and whom Sultan Ahmed skilfully succeeded in making her leave the new Palace"

She was buried next to her husband Murad III in the Murad III's türbe, inside the Hagia Sophia, Istanbul.

== Issue ==
It is believed that Safiye Sultan had a monogamous relationship with Murad and that she was his only concubine between 1563 and 1580 circa.

From Murad, Safiye had at least six children, three sons and three daughters:

- Hümaşah Sultan (Manisa, c. 1564 – Constantinople, buried in Murad III's mausoleum in Hagia Sofia Mosque). Also called Hüma Sultan. She married Nişar Mustafazade Mehmed Pasha (died 1586). She may have then married Serdar Ferhad Pasha (d. 1595) in 1591. She was lastly married in 1605 to Damad Nakkaş Hasan Pasha (d. 1622).
- Ayşe Sultan (Manisa, 1565 – Constantinople, 15 May 1605). She married three times.
- Mehmed III (Manisa, 26 May 1566 – Constantinople, 21 December 1603); he succeeded his father as Ottoman sultan.
- Şehzade Selim (Manisa, 1567 – 25 May 1577, buried in Hagia Sofia Mosque).
- Şehzade Mahmud (Manisa, 1568 – ante 1580, buried in Hagia Sofia Mosque).
- Fatma Sultan (Manisa, 1573 – Constantinople, 1620). She married three times.

She was also probably, but not certainly, the mother of:

- Mihrimah Sultan (Constantinople, c.1578/1579 – Constantinople, after 1625). She married twice.

In addition to these, a European braggart, Alexander of Montenegro, claimed to be the lost son of Murad III and Safiye Sultan, presenting himself with the name of Şehzade Yahya and claiming the throne for it. His claims were never proven and are not believed to be true by modern historians.

== In literature and popular culture ==
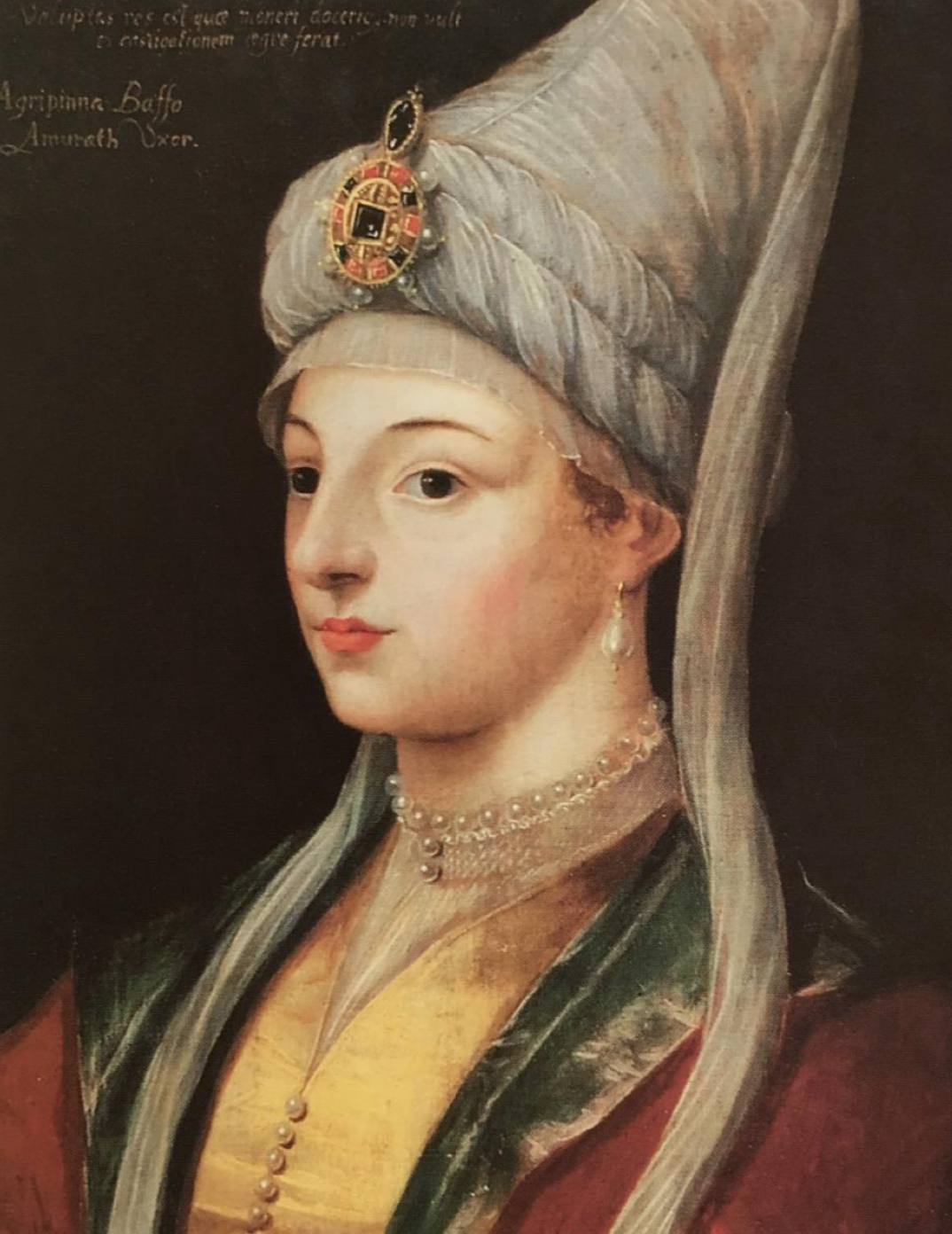
Imaginary portrait of Safiye Sultan, c. 18th century

- In Ann Chamberlin’s Sofia, she is depicted as a 14-year-old Venetian noble girl who was taken by Corsairs to Constantinople.
- In Katie Hickman's The Aviary Gate, which talks about Safiye Sultan's interactions with an English merchant and the story of an English captive in the harem, she appears as an important character. It shows a detailed explanation of how she ended up in the harem from her homeland in Albanian mountains.
- In Mary Shelly's Frankenstein 1818, the minor character that appears in the novel who is called Safie is believed to be inspired by Safiye Sultan.
- In the 1955 film Sultana Safiyè, Safiye is played by Italian actress Maria Frau.
- In the 2010 film Mahpeyker: Kösem Sultan, Safiye is played by Turkish actress Selda Özer.
- In the 2011 TV series Muhteşem Yüzyıl, a young Safiye Sultan is portrayed by Turkish actress Gözde Türker. She is gifted to Murad by Mihrimah Sultan, Murad's aunt, instead of his cousin Hümaşah Sultan.
- In the 2015 TV series Muhteşem Yüzyıl: Kösem, sequel/spin-off of the first, an old Safiye Sultan, now grandmother of the new Sultan Ahmed I, is portrayed by Turkish actress Hülya Avşar.

== See also ==
- Lists of mosques
- List of mosques in Africa
- List of mosques in Egypt
- Ottoman dynasty
- Ottoman family tree
- List of Valide Sultans
- List of consorts of the Ottoman Sultans

== Bibliography ==
- Alderson, A. D. (1956). The Structure of the Ottoman Dynasty. Oxford: Clarendon.
- Andrea, Bernadette (2007). Women and Islam in Early Modern English Literature. Cambridge: Cambridge University Press. ISBN 978-0-521-12176-7.
- Börekçi, Günhan (2009). "Ahmed I". In Ágoston, Gábor; Masters, Bruce (eds.). Encyclopedia of the Ottoman Empire. New York: Facts on File. ISBN 978-0-8160-6259-1.
- Jardine, Lisa (2004). "Gloriana Rules the Waves: Or, the Advantage of Being Excommunicated (And a Woman)". Transactions of the Royal Historical Society. 6 (14): 209–222. doi:10.1017/S0080440104000234.
- Pedani, M. P. (2000). "Safiye's Household and Venetian Diplomacy". Turcica. 32: 9–32. doi:10.2143/TURC.32.0.460.
- Peirce, Leslie Penn (1993). The Imperial Harem: Women and Sovereignty in the Ottoman Empire. Studies in Middle Eastern History. New York: Oxford University Press. ISBN 978-0-19-507673-8.
- Skilliter, Susan (1965). "Three Letters from the Ottoman 'Sultana' Ṣāfiye to Queen Elizabeth I". In S. M. Stern (ed.). Documents from Islamic Chanceries. Oriental Studies. Oxford: Bruno Cassirer.

Ottoman royalty
Preceded by Nurbanu Sultan	Haseki Sultan; 1575 – 15 January 1595	Succeeded by Kösem Sultan
Preceded by Nurbanu Sultan	Valide Sultan; 15 January 1595 – 22 December 1603	Succeeded by Handan Sultan
