= Ayşe Hümaşah Sultan =

Ottoman princess (1541– post 1618)

- Born: c. 1541; Constantinople, Ottoman Empire
- Died: 1604 (aged 62–63); Constantinople, Ottoman Empire
- Burial: Complex of Şeyh ‘Azîz Mahmûd Hüdâyî Efendi, Üsküdar
- Spouse: Semiz Ahmed Pasha (m. 1557; died 1580) Feridun Ahmed Bey (m. 1582; died 1583)
- Issue: 10 children
Names
- Turkish: Ayşe Hümaşah Sultan; Ottoman Turkish: عائشه ھما شاہ سلطان
- Dynasty: Ottoman
- Father: Rüstem Pasha
- Mother: Mihrimah Sultan
- Religion: Sunni Islam

Ayşe Hümaşah Sultan (Ottoman Turkish: عایشه سلطان; 1541–1604) was an Ottoman princess, the only daughter of princess Mihrimah Sultan and Rüstem Pasha (Grand Vizier 1544–53, 1555–61). She was the granddaughter of Sultan Suleiman the Magnificent (1520–1566) and his legal wife Hürrem Sultan.

== Early life ==
Ayşe Humaşah Sultan was born in 1541 in Istanbul. Her father was Rüstem Pasha, a devshirme from Croatia, and her mother was Mihrimah Sultan, the daughter of Sultan Suleiman the Magnificent and Hürrem Sultan. She was the only daughter of her parents, but she had at least a younger brother, Sultanzade Osman Bey. Like her cousin Hümaşah Sultan, she was reportedly beloved by her grandfather. A sign of her grandfather's favour towards her can be seen from her title: Ayşe Hümaşah was in fact titled Sultan as the daughters of the male members of the dynasty, rather than with the inferior title of Hanımsultan as the daughter of the female members. Consequently, her sons and daughters, who as great-grandchildren in the female line of a Sultan should have neither titles nor be considered members of the imperial family, were instead entitled to the titles of Sultanzade for males and Hanımsultan for females, as was rule for the children of a Sultana. Ayşe Hümaşah, her mother, and her cousin would all imitate the communication style ushered in by her grandmother Hürrem, whose letters to the Sultan are known for their colourfulness, charm, and smoothness.

== Marriages ==
=== First marriage ===
Ayşe Hümaşah married three times. Her first husband was the future Grand vizier, Semiz Ahmed Pasha. They married on 27 November 1557, when she was sixteen. The two together had ten children. Her mother used to send two thousand ducats to the couple every week. Semiz Ahmed Pasha served as grand vizier from 1579 until his death on 27 April 1580.

=== Second marriage ===
After Ahmed's death, Ayşe Hümaşah married Feridun Ahmed Bey, who had served twice as the head scribe of the imperial chancery. The marriage took place on 7 April 1582. Kizlar Agha Mehmed Agha, served as her agent, while Miralem Mahmud Agha served as Feridun Pasha's agent. The marriage was performed by Sheikh-ul-Islam Çivizade Hacı Mehmet Efendi. Her dowry was 35,000 gold coins. The marriage, however, lasted only eleven months because the pasha died on 16 March 1583.

=== Third marriage (?) ===
According to rumors, Ayşe Hümaşah Sultan would also have married Mahmud Hudayi Pasha. This marriage is thought to have taken place in 1590. But there is no clear evidence to confirm the marriage.

== Political affairs ==
After her mother's death in 1578, the Ragusans turned to her, with a petition to act in their favour and support them in a manner her mother did, whose death they mourned deeply. In fact, all of this they reported to Behram Kethüda, who by sultan's order was to attend to Ayşe Hümaşah after Mihrimah's death. She and her husband Semiz Pasha shared disposition towards the Ragusans. When her son Mehmed Bey was installed as Sanjak-bey of Herzegovina in 1592, she soon wrote him a letter of recommendation for the Ragusans. In 1591, she proposed to pay the expenses of one hundred galleys for six months, if her son-in-law Çiğalazade Sinan Pasha was made Kapudan Pasha. According to the French ambassador Jacques de Germigny, Ayşe Hümaşah formed a political faction with Safiye Sultan to oppose Nurbanu Sultan and her allies.

She inherited a large sum of money from her mother Mihrimah: she was most likely richer than the Sultan himself, and left him, at her death, an inheritance richer than the treasury of the State.

== Last years and death ==
In 1595, Ayşe Hümaşah Sultan made the Hajj pilgrimage to Mecca. In 1598, she commissioned a fountain in Üsküdar.

Possibly, she died in 1604 and was buried in the complex of Aziz Mahmud Hudayi, Üsküdar; but, as it is stated in another source, she saw the ascension to the throne of Sultan Ahmed I and was still alive in 1604: according to the harem payment registers, in that year she is registered as the widow of her second husband Feridun Ahmed Bey (even if she married three times) and received 150 aspers a day, and was listed immediately below Safiye Sultan (3000 aspers), Handan Sultan (1000 aspers), the daughters of Safiye Sultan (400 aspers), and Gevherhan Sultan (350 aspers).

== Issue ==
Ayşe Humaşah had ten children by her first husband, five sons and five daughters:

=== Sons ===
- Sultanzade Mahmud Pasha (died 1602 buried in the Mihrimah Sultan Mosque) sanjak-bey of Kastamonu, Nakhchivan and of Şebinkarahisar;
- Sultanzade Mehmed Bey (died 1593), sanjak-bey of Herzegovina;
- Sultanzade Şehid Mustafa Pasha (died 1593), sanjak-bey of Klis;
- Sultanzade Osman Bey (died 1590/1591, buried in Mihrimah Sultan Mosque), sanjak-bey of Şebinkarahisar;
- Sultanzade Abdurrahman Bey, (died in 1597), buried in Mihrimah Sultan Mosque), married his niece Ayşe Hanım, daughter of his sister Saliha and Cığalazade Yusuf Sinan Pasha, and had a son, Semiz Mehmed Pasha.

=== Daughters ===
- Saliha Hanımsultan (1561–1580) married in October 1576 to Cığalazade Yusuf Sinan Pasha. Mihrimah Sultan spent 70.000 gold coins for her wedding. They had a son, Cağaloğlu Mahmud Pasha (died in 1643, who married two daughters of Sultan Mehmed III, first on 10 February 1612 Hatice Sultan, and after her death in 1613 her half-sister Hümaşah Sultan, in October 1613), and a daughter, Ayşe Hanım (who married her maternal uncle Sultanzade Abdurrahman Bey and had a son, Semiz Mehmed Pasha).
- Safiye Hanımsultan. In March 1581, after her older sister Saliha's death in 1580, she married Cığalazade Yusuf Sinan Pasha. They had two sons, Mehmed Bey (who married a daughter of Murad III) and Hüseyn Bey, and a daughter.
- Hatice Hanımsultan, married Kapıcıbaşı Mahmud Bey in December 1584. Mahmud was initially supposed to marry Ayşe Sultan, granddaughter of his patroness Nurbanu Sultan, but after Nurbanu's death in 1583, the bride's mother, Safiye, married him to Hatice instead, so that she could marry her daughter to a candidate of her choice.
- Ayşe Hanımsultan.
- Fatma Hanımsultan, married in March 1596 to Yemenli Hasan Pasha. She had two sons and a daughter.

== In popular culture ==
- In the 2011–2014 TV series Muhteşem Yüzyıl, Ayşe Sultan is portrayed by Kayra Aleyna Zabcı.
