= Enderun School =

Elite bureaucratic school in Turkey

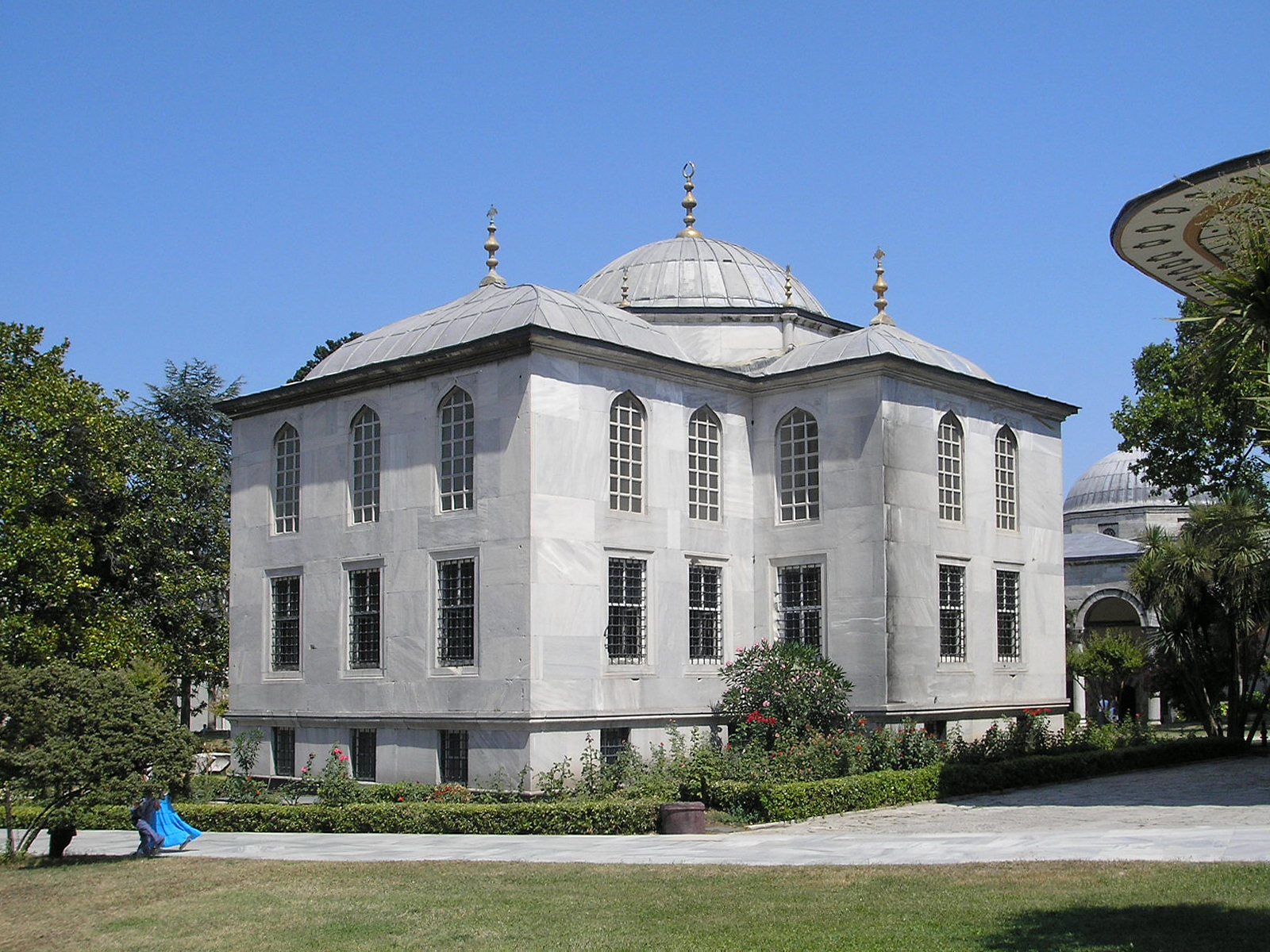
The Enderun Library

The Enderun School (Ottoman Turkish: اندرون مکتب, romanized: Enderûn Mektebi) was a palace school and boarding school within Topkapi Palace. It was mostly for princes of the court and the Janissaries of the Ottoman Empire. Students here were primarily recruited via devşirme, a system of the Islamization of abducted Christian slave children for serving the Ottoman government in bureaucratic, managerial, and Janissary military positions. Over the centuries, the Enderun School was fairly successful in generating Ottoman statesmen by drawing among the empire's various ethnic groups and giving them a common Muslim education. The school was run by the "Inner Service" (Enderûn) of the Ottoman palace and had both academic and military purposes. The graduates were expected to devote themselves to government service and be free of links to lower social groups.

The Enderun School's gifted education program has been called the world's first institutionalized education for the gifted.

== History ==
The growth of Ottoman Empire is attributed and was dependent on the selection and education of statesmen. A vital component of Mehmet II's goal to revive the Ottoman Empire was to establish a special school to select the best youngsters within the empire and to mould them for government. Mehmet II improved the existing palace school founded by his father, Murat II and established the Enderun Academy (Enderun) in Istanbul.

== Buildings ==
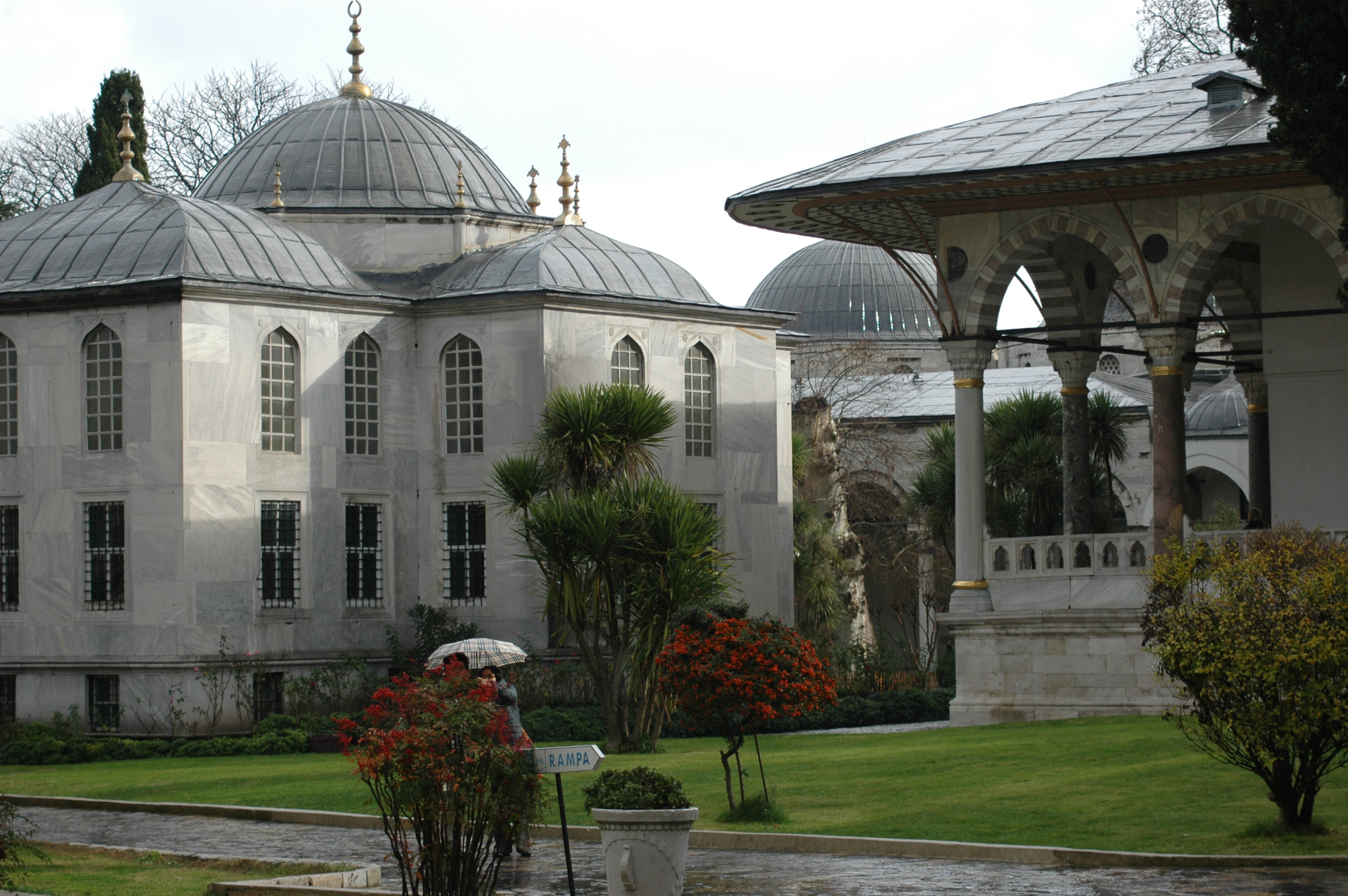
Enderun Library in Topkapi Palace

The third courtyard of the Topkapi Palace was surrounded by the Imperial Treasury, the Pavilion of the Holy Mantle, and the buildings of the Palace School, which educated the top tier of students from Enderun as well as princes of the House of Osman. There were seven halls or grades within the Palace School, and within each hall there were 12 teachers responsible for the students' mental and academic development. Students wore special uniforms designated by their achievement level. Additional buildings included the library, mosque, music conservatories, dormitories, and baths.

== Curriculum ==
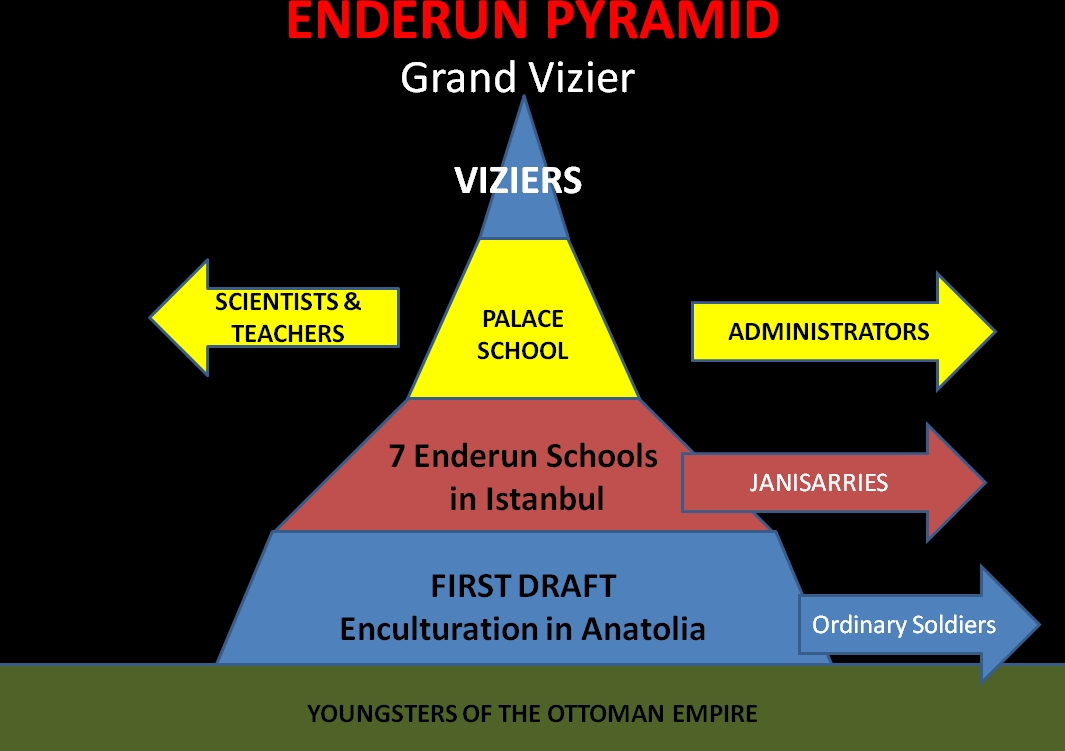
Enderun pyramid

The Enderun system consisted of three preparatory schools located outside of the palace in addition to the one within the palace walls itself. According to Miller, there were 1,000–2,000 students in three Enderun Colleges, and about 300 students in the top school in the Palace. The curriculum was divided into five main divisions:

- Islamic sciences; including Arabic, Turkish and Persian language education
- Positive sciences; mathematics, astronomy, medicine, geography
- History, law, and administration: the customs of the Palace and government issues
- Vocational studies, including art and music education
- Physical training, including weaponry

At the end of the Enderun school system, the graduates would be able to speak, read, and write at least three languages, able to understand the latest developments in science, have at least a craft or art, and excel in army command as well as in close combat skills.

== Graduation ==
The graduation ceremony for students leaving the Enderun School was known as çıkma. The graduates themselves were referred to as çıkma. The word çıkma literally means "who has exited". The pages were leaving Palace School and palace service to continue their training in the functional service. This "transferral" occurred every two to seven years, or after the accession of new sultan to the throne.

The successful graduates were assigned according to their abilities into two mainstream positions: governmental or science, and those who failed to advance were assigned to military. One of the most distinctive properties of the school was its merit system consisting of carefully graded rewards and corresponding punishments.
