= Ayşe Sultan (daughter of Murad III) =

Ottoman princess, daughter of Sultan Murad III

- Born: c. 1565; Manisa, Ottoman Empire
- Died: 15 May 1605 (aged 39–40); Constantinople, Ottoman Empire (present day Istanbul, Turkey)
- Burial: Mehmed III Mausoleum, Hagia Sophia, Istanbul
- Spouse: Bosnian Ibrahim Pasha (m. 1586; died 1601) Yemişçi Hasan Pasha (m. 1602; died 1603) Güzelce Mahmud Pasha (m. 1604)
- Issue: First marriage Sultanzade Mehmed Bey; Fülane Hanımsultan
- Dynasty: Ottoman
- Father: Murad III
- Mother: Safiye Sultan
- Religion: Sunni Islam

Ayşe Sultan (Ottoman Turkish: عائشه سلطان; c. 1565 – 15 May 1605) was an Ottoman princess, daughter of Sultan Murad III (reign 1574–1595) and Safiye Sultan, and sister of Sultan Mehmed III (reign 1595–1603) of the Ottoman Empire.

== Early life ==
Ayşe Sultan was born in 1565. She was the daughter of Sultan Murad III, and his consort Safiye Sultan. She had at least five full siblings: three brothers, Sultan Mehmed III, Şehzade Selim and Şehzade Mahmud, and two sisters, Hümaşah Sultan and Fatma Sultan.

== Marriages ==
In 1582, Murad betrothed Ayşe to Bosnian Ibrahim Pasha. However, her grandmother, Nurbanu Sultan was against this marriage, because she wanted her to marry her adoptive son, Kapıcıbaşı Mahmud Bey, who had been given to her by her husband Sultan Selim II as a child. After Nurbanu's death in December 1583, Mahmud married Hatice Hanımsultan, daughter of Ayşe Hümaşah Sultan (Suleiman I's granddaughter), in December 1584. He thus gave up every hope to eventually marry Ayşe, since in order to marry a princess a man had to repudiate his other wives.

Ayşe Sultan finally married Ibrahim Pasha on 20 May 1586. Her wedding took place at the Old Palace, and was celebrated in a seven-day ceremony. Historian Mustafa Selaniki mentions the preparations, the presents which were given by both parties, the feasts, prepared for the Nakibü'l-esraf and the sadat, for the Şeyhülislam (supreme religious leader), the ulema and the high-ranking officials. A year into the marriage, Murad dismissed Ibrahim Pasha from his post, because according to the chronicle of Hasan Beyzade, his damat, or bridegroom, status was an obstacle to sailing. Ibrahim served three times as Grand Vizier to Ayşe's brother Sultan Mehmed III. Ayse had a son Sultanzade Mehmed Bey and a daughter who both died in infancy.

Ayşe Sultan was widowed upon Ibrahim Pasha's death on 10 July 1601. Yemişci Hasan Pasha became the new Grand Vizier. A telhis of Hasan Pasha announced that Sultan Mehmed had promised him the hand of Ayşe in marriage. In accordance to this telhis, historian Mustafa Naima suggests that Yemişci Hasan Pasha and Ayşe Sultan were only engaged. The wedding took place on 5 April 1602. The marriage was unhappy for her, but when a year later Mehmed decided to execute Yemişci Hasan Pasha, Ayşe sent a letter to her mother, Safiye Sultan, and her brother, in which she promised that if the Sultan forgave her husband, they would go to Mecca without any further charge or trouble. However, the Sultan's reply indicated that she could accompany him in death if she insisted. Yemisci was executed on 18 October 1603. In 1604, she married Güzelce Mahmud Pasha (died 1606).

== Charities ==
Ayşe was well known for her charity. In her testament, she gave the following instructions for her inheritance: her slaves and slave girls were to be manumitted unconditionally; 10,000 akçes were bequeathed to cover the cash debts of people detained in prison for debts of up to 500 akçes; 2,000 akçes were for the poor, sick and orphans, and the remainder for the poor in the holy cities of Mecca, Medina, and Jerusalem. A certain amount of money was allocated to pay the ransom for Muslim prisoners of war, with the condition that female captives be freed first.

== Death ==
Ayşe Sultan died on 15 May 1605, and was buried in her brother Mehmed's mausoleum located at Hagia Sophia Mosque, Istanbul.

== Issue ==
By her first marriage, Ayşe Sultan had a son and a daughter:

- Sultanzade Mehmed Bey. Died in infancy and was buried with his father in his türbe (Şehzade Mosque).
- Fülane Hanımsultan. Died as newborn and was buried with her father in his türbe (Şehzade Mosque).

== Legacy ==
Ayşe Sultan owned a translation of "The Ascension of Propitious Stars and Sources of Sovereignty" (Matali' us-sa'ade ve menabi' us-siyade).

== Bibliography ==
- Çeliktemel, Başak (2012). A study of the third English ambassador Henry Lello's report on the Ottoman Empire (1597-1607).
- Peirce, Leslie P. (1993). The Imperial Harem: Women and Sovereignty in the Ottoman Empire. Oxford University Press. ISBN 978-0-195-08677-5.
- Uluçay, Mustafa Çağatay (2011). Padişahların kadınları ve kızları. Ankara: Ötüken. ISBN 978-9-754-37840-5.
