= Mustafa Selaniki =

16th century Ottoman scholar and chronicler

Personal life
- Born: Mustafa of Salonica Salonica, Ottoman Empire
- Died: c. 1600
- Main interest(s): History, Ottoman Empire
- Notable work: Tarih-i Selâniki

Religious life
- Religion: Islam
- Denomination: Sunni

Muslim leader
- Influenced: * Ottoman historians

Mustafa Selaniki (Turkish: Selanıkî Mustafa; Mustafa of Salonica; died c. 1600), also known as Selanıkî Mustafa Efendi, was an Ottoman scholar and chronicler, whose Tarih-i Selâniki described the Ottoman Empire of 1563–1599. He was a secretary of the Imperial Divan but his Tarih was not servile and included criticisms of the sultans directly. The Tarih-i Selâniki is considered one of the most individualistic accounts of 16th-century Ottoman life. It also offered one of the most detailed accounts of the cold and famine in Anatolia in the 1590s related to the Little Ice Age.

Very little is known about Selaniki's life, including his family, background, or age, but parts of his education can be inferred; Selaniki stated that he was one of the six hafiz who recited from the Quran over the body of Suleiman the Magnificent.

== Tarih-i Selâniki ==
The Tarih-i Selâniki was not widely incorporated into Ottoman historiography and was only partially published in 1864; the publication itself contained many edits, modifications, and interpolations. The historian Solakzade Mehmed Hemdemi is thought to have had access to it, but did not credit the work to Selaniki specifically.

The chronicle begins with a description of torrential rain falling in September 1563 and concludes with the escape of Kasim Voyvoda from his captors in May 1600. It spans the reign of four sultans: the final years of Suleiman the Magnificent, the entirety of the reigns of Selim II and Murad III, and the first five years of Mehmed III's reign.

== Works ==
- İpşirli, Mehmed (ed.). Tarih-i Selâniki. Istanbul: Türk Tarih Kurumu Yayınları. ISBN 9789751608932. OCLC 949392862.

== See also ==
- Salonica
