= Mihrimah Sultan (daughter of Suleiman I) =

Ottoman princess (1522–1578)

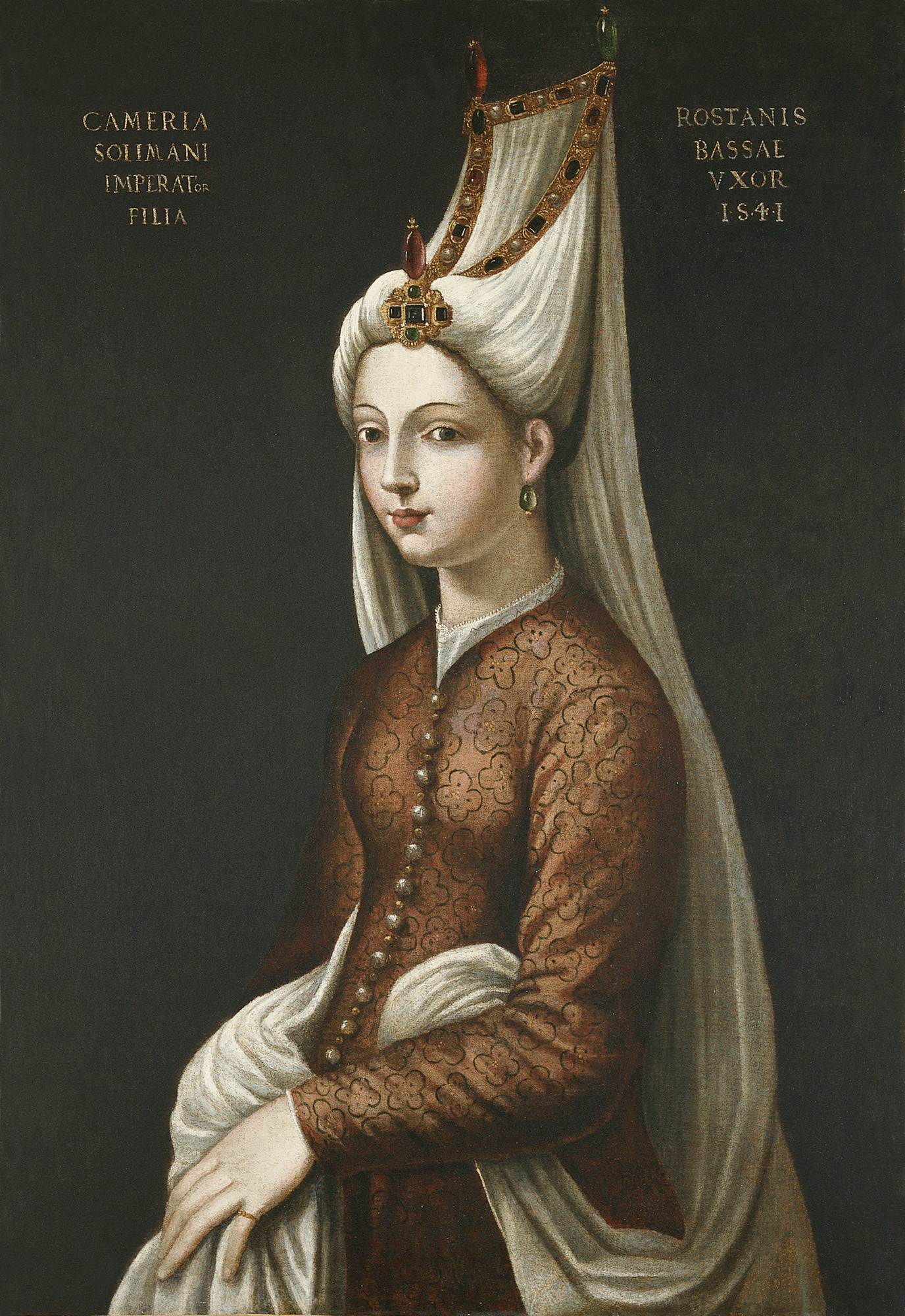
- Portrait by Cristofano dell'Altissimo titled Cameria Solimani, 1541
- Born: September 1522; Old Palace, Constantinople, Ottoman Empire
- Died: 25 January 1578 (aged 55); Old Palace, Constantinople, Ottoman Empire
- Burial: Süleymaniye Mosque, Istanbul
- Spouse: Rüstem Pasha (m. 1539; died 1561)
- Issue: Ayşe Hümaşah Sultan; Sultanzade Osman Bey
Names
- Turkish: Mihrimah Sultan; Ottoman Turkish: مهرماہ سلطان
- Dynasty: Ottoman
- Father: Suleiman the Magnificent
- Mother: Hürrem Sultan
- Religion: Sunni Islam

Mihrimah Sultan (Ottoman Turkish: مهرماه سلطان; Turkish pronunciation: [mihɾiˈmah suɫˈtan]; September 1522 – 25 January 1578) was an Ottoman princess, the only daughter of Ottoman Sultan Suleiman the Magnificent and his wife, Hürrem Sultan. According to historian Mustafa Selaniki, she was the most powerful imperial princess in Ottoman history.

== Name ==
Mihrimah or Mihrümah means "Sun and Moon", or "Light of the Moon" in Persian. To Westerners, she was known as Sultana Cameria, which is a variant of Qamariyyah, an Arabic version of her name meaning "of the moon". Her portrait by Cristofano dell'Altissimo was entitled Cameria Solimani. She was also known as Hanım Sultan, which means "Madam Princess".

== Early life ==
Mihrimah was born in Istanbul in September 1522 during the reign of her father, Suleiman the Magnificent. Her mother was Hürrem Sultan, who was the Sultan's concubine but was freed in 1534 and became Suleyman's legal wife. Mihrimah had five full brothers: Şehzade Mehmed, Şehzade Selim (the future Selim II), Şehzade Abdullah, who died at the age of three, Şehzade Bayezid, and Şehzade Cihangir. Well-educated and disciplined, she was also sophisticated, eloquent and well-read.

== Marriage ==
In 1539, Suleiman decided that Mihrimah should be married to Rüstem Pasha, probably from Croatia, who had been seized through the devshirme and rose to become governor of Diyarbakır. Rüstem's enemies circulated a rumour that he had leprosy but the doctor dispatched to Diyarbakır to examine him found this to be untrue, although a louse was found in his clothing, despite the fact that he changed his garments daily.

The marriage took place on 26 November 1539 in the Old Palace. Her wedding ceremony and the celebration for her younger brothers Bayezid and Cihangir's circumcision occurred on the same day, with the collective festivities lasting fifteen days. Five years later, in 1544, Süleyman selected her husband to become grand vizier, a post he held until his death in 1561, bar a two-year interval when he was dismissed to assuage popular outrage following the execution of Şehzade Mustafa in 1553.

Shortly after her wedding, she developed a rheumatoid-like disease and spent most of her life dealing with this condition. In 1544, she traveled to Bursa with her mother and husband and a large military escort. Although Mihrimah and her mother made efforts to promote Rüstem as an intimate of the sultan, he was actually kept at a distance from the royal presence. Mihrimah and Rüstem had one daughter, Ayşe Hümaşah Sultan, born in 1541, and at least one son, Sultanzade Osman Bey, who was born in 1546 and who died in 1576.

In 1554, Mihrimah suffered a miscarriage that almost cost her her life. An anonymous author suggested that the couple lived in Pera, although it is more likely that they settled in Mihrimah's palace in Üsküdar. In March 1558, Shaykh Qutb al-Din al-Nahrawali, a religious figure from Mecca, visited Istanbul. In April, he met Mihrimah, and gave her gifts. He met her again in June just before he left Istanbul for Cairo.

After Rüstem's death in 1561, she offered to marry Semiz Ali Pasha, who had succeeded him as grand vizier. When he declined, she chose not to marry again, returning instead to the royal palace.

== Political affairs ==
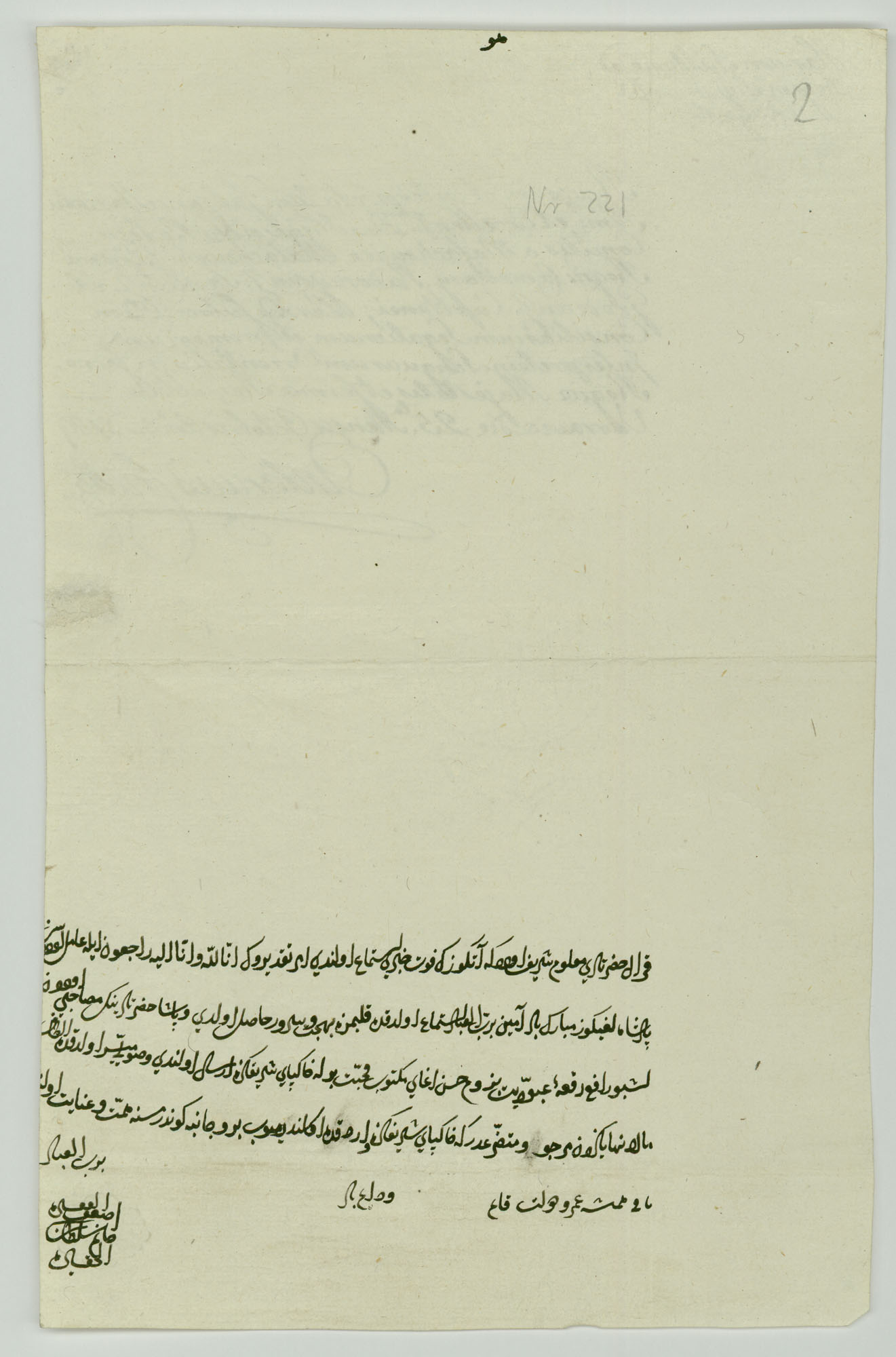
Letter written by Mihrimah Sultan to Sigismund II Augustus in 1548

Although there is no proof of Hürrem or Mihrimah's direct involvement in her half-brother Şehzade Mustafa's downfall, Ottoman and foreign accounts suggest that it was widely believed that Mihrimah worked with Hürrem and Rüstem to eliminate Mustafa to ensure the throne for Hürrem's son and Mihrimah's full brother, Bayezid. The rivalry ended when Mustafa was executed at his own father's command in 1553 during the campaign against Safavid Persia. Although these accounts were not based on first-hand sources, a fear of Mustafa was not unreasonable: had he ascended to the throne, all Mihrimah's full brothers (Selim, Bayezid, and Cihangir) would probably have been executed, according to the fratricidal custom of the Ottoman dynasty, which required the brothers of a new sultan to be executed to avoid feuding. Mihrimah, Rüstem and Hürrem were also blamed for the execution in 1555 of the Grand Vizier Kara Ahmed Pasha, whose elimination cleared the way for Rüstem's return as Grand Vizier.

Hürrem sent letters to Sigismund II, King of Poland and Grand Duke of Lithuania, the contents of which were mirrored in letters written by Mihrimah, and sent by the same courier, who also carried letters from the sultan and her husband Rüstem Pasha the Grand Vizier. After Hürrem's death, Mihrimah also became Süleyman's advisor and confidant, urging him to undertake the conquest of Malta in 1565, and sending him news and forwarding letters for him when he was absent from the capital. She enlisted the help of the Grand Vizier Semiz Ali Pasha, and promised to outfit 400 ships at her own expense. However, Süleyman and his son Selim prevented the campaign from proceeding so that the admiral, Piyale Pasha, could stay in Istanbul with his new wife, Gevherhan Sultan, Selim's daughter. It is also likely that she encouraged Süleyman's decision to launch a campaign against Hungary in 1566, where he met his death at Szigetvár.

Temporary closures of the western and/or eastern grain markets, food shortages and poor harvests led to several crises in the sixteenth century. The citizens of the Dalmatian Republic of Ragusa managed to survive thanks to supplies of Ottoman grain which Mihrimah helped to facilitate. The Ragusans' decision to approach Mihrimah for help may have been the result of tensions between the Republic and the kapudan pasha, Piyale Pasha. During the Great Siege of Malta in 1565, several Ragusan ships sailed in the Christian fleet, as Piyale Pasha reported to the Porte. To Ragusan horror, his ships sailed into their waters and raided the island of Mljet. However, true problems emerged in 1566, leading Ragusan ambassadors to petition Mihrimah to act as their protector.

In later years Mihrimah retired to the Old Palace (Eski Saray). As soon as he came to power, Selim turned to her for help as he needed money, after which she lent him fifty thousand gold coins. She then continued to act as his advisor. In 1571, the Ragusans asked her to speak to the sultan on their behalf, and to "spare a couple of kind words for their love's sake".

In 1575, during the reign of her nephew Sultan Murad III, her daily stipend consisted of 600 aspers. When the French refused to return two Turkish women who had been captured at sea by Henry III's brother-in-law and made members of Catherine de' Medici's court, Mihrimah and her niece, Ismihan Sultan intervened on their behalf. When Cığalazade Yusuf Sinan Pasha married her granddaughter Saliha Hanimsultan in October 1576, Mihrimah provided him with a huge dowry including gold and valuable clothes. She also supported him against his rivals inside the court such as Safiye Sultan, Ferhad Pasha, Damat Ibrahim and Halil Pashas.

== Mosques and charities ==
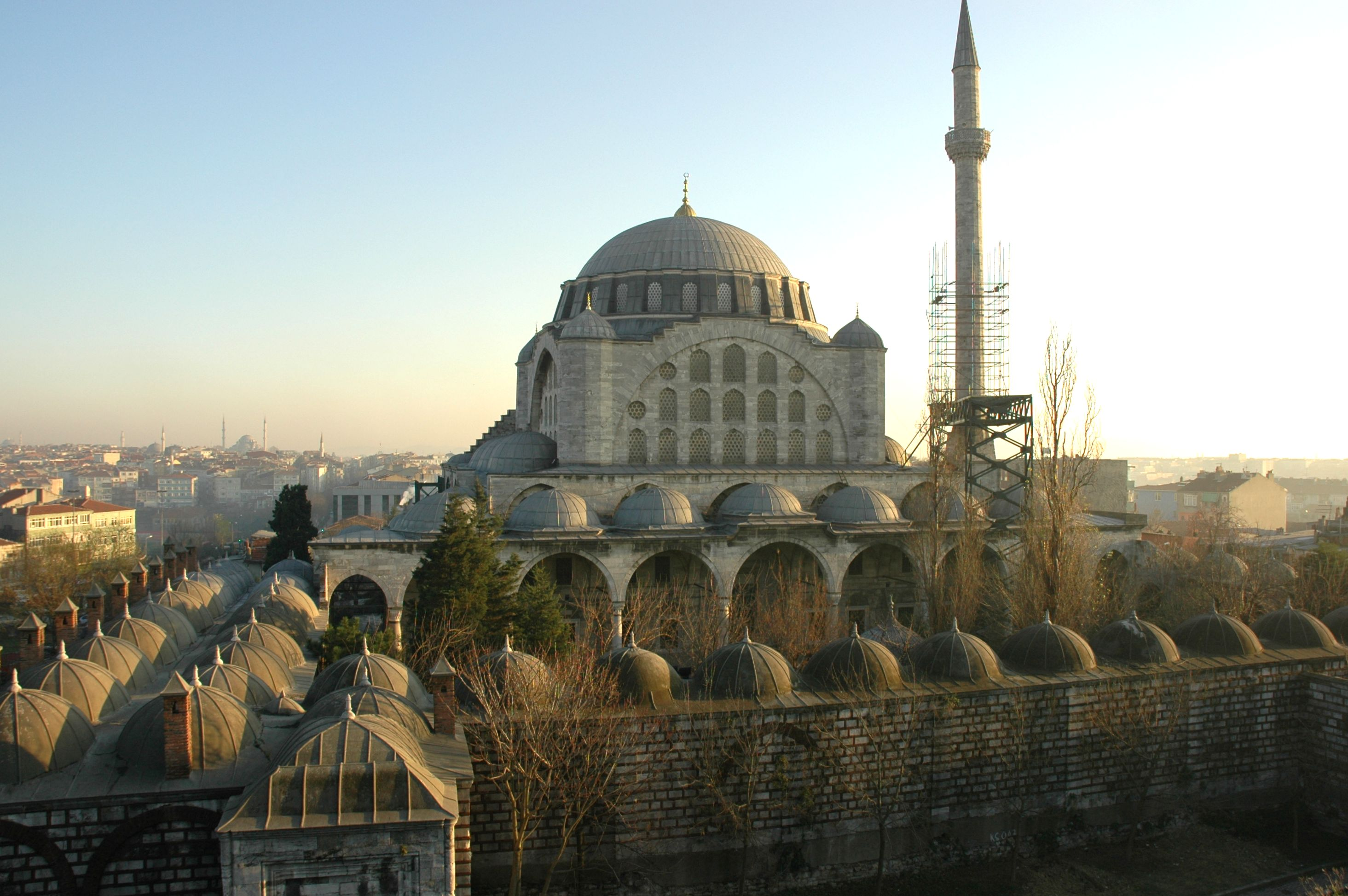
Mihrimah Sultan Mosque at Edirnekapı

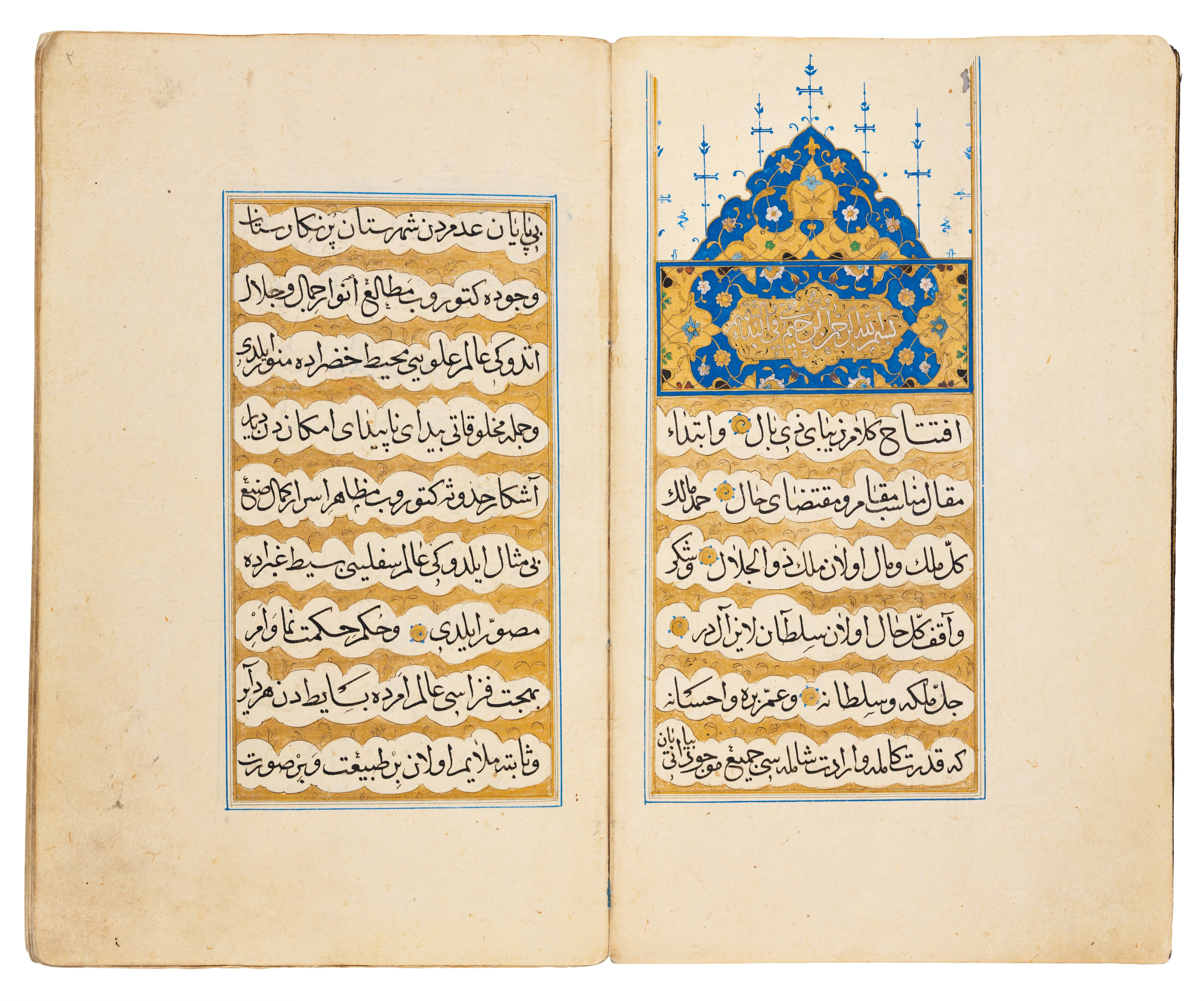
Endowment deed of Mihrimah Sultan. This document concerns the endowment of properties in Anatolia and Rumelia, from which revenues were to be used to meet the expenses of the Mihrimah Sultan Mosque complex. April–March 1550. Sadberk Hanım Museum

Mihrimah Sultan also commissioned a number of major architectural projects. Her most famous commissions are the two Istanbul mosque complexes that bear her name, both designed by her father's chief architect, Mimar Sinan.

The first Mihrimah Sultan Mosque (Turkish: Mihrimah Sultan Camii), also known as the İskele Mosque (Turkish: İskele Camii), is one of Üsküdar's most prominent landmarks and was built between 1543 or 1544 and 1548. The twin-minaret mosque complex consisted of a mosque, a medrese, a soup kitchen to feed the poor, a clinic and a primary school. The primary school, library and medrese are now used as an outpatient clinic.

The second Mihrimah Sultan Mosque beside the Edirne Gate (Turkish: Edirnekapı) in the western wall of the old city of Istanbul was built between 1562 and 1565. It consists of a fountain, medrese and hamam. Unlike its namesake, it features a single minaret.

She also funded the repair of the 'Ayn Zubaydah spring in Mecca and established a foundation to supply wrought iron to the navy.

== Death ==
Mihrimah Sultan died in Istanbul on 25 January 1578 having outlived all her siblings. She is Suleiman's only child to have been buried in his tomb in the Süleymaniye Mosque complex.

== Issue ==
Mihrimah Sultan and Rüstem had a daughter and at least one son:

- Ayşe Hümaşah Sultan (1541–1604). She married three times and had five sons and five daughters.
- Sultanzade Osman Bey (1546–1576). Buried with his father in his türbe, Şehzade Mosque.

== In literature and popular culture ==
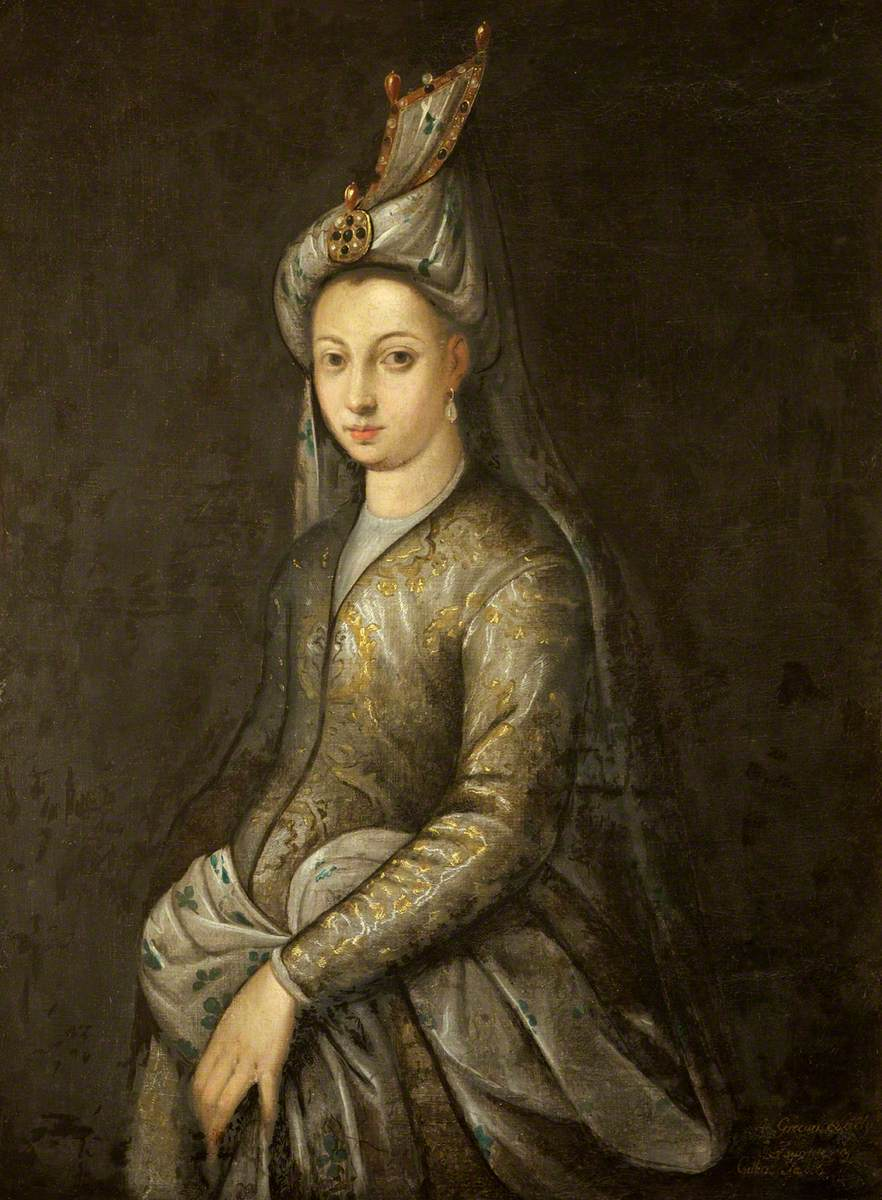
Titian's portrait of Mihrimah, entitled Cameria, Daughter of Suleiman the Magnificent as St. Catherine.

- In the 2003 Turkish TV miniseries, Hürrem Sultan, Mihrimah was played by Turkish actress Özlem Çınar.
- In the 2011–2014 TV series Muhteşem Yüzyıl (The Magnificent Century) she was portrayed by Pelin Karahan.
- She appears as a central character in The Architect's Apprentice, a 2014 novel by Elif Shafak.
- She is one of the central characters in the book Hürrem ve Mihrimah Sultan: Haremin Gülü ve Goncası (Turkish: Hürrem and Mihrimah Sultan: The Rose and the Rosebud of Harem) by Muhterem Yüceyılmaz.

== Bibliography ==
- Atçıl, Zahit (2020). "Osmanlı Hanedanının Evlilik Politikaları ve Mihrimah Sultan'ın Evliliği". Güneydoğu Avrupa Araştırmaları Dergis (34): 1–26.
- Isom-Verhaaren, Christine (11 April 2016). "Mihrimah Sultan: A Princess Constructs Ottoman Dynastic Identity". In Christine Isom-Verhaaren; Kent F. Schull (eds.). Living in the Ottoman Realm: Empire and Identity, 13th to 20th Centuries. Indiana University Press. ISBN 9780253019486.
- Miović, Vesna (2 May 2018). "Per favore della Soltana: moćne osmanske žene i dubrovački diplomati". Anali Zavoda za Povijesne Znanosti Hrvatske Akademije Znanosti i Umjetnosti u Dubrovniku (in Croatian). 56 (56/1): 147–197. doi:10.21857/mwo1vczp2y. ISSN 1330-0598.
- Nahrawālī, Muḥammad ibn Aḥmad; Blackburn, Richard (2005). Journey to the Sublime Porte: The Arabic Memoir of a Sharifian Agent's Diplomatic Mission to the Ottoman Imperial Court in the Era of Suleyman the Magnificent; the Relevant Text from Quṭb al-Dīn al-Nahrawālī's al-Fawāʼid al-sanīyah fī al-riḥlah al-Madanīyah wa al-Rūmīyah. Orient-Institut. ISBN 978-3-899-13441-4.
- Peirce, Leslie (1993). Imperial Harem: Women and Sovereignty in the Ottoman Empire. Oxford University Press. ISBN 0-19-508677-5.
- Uluçay, Mustafa Çağatay (1992). Padışahların kadınları ve kızları. Türk Tarihi Kurumu Yayınları.
- Yermolenko, Galina (2005). "Roxolana: The Greatest Empress of the East". The Muslim World. 95 (2): 231–248. doi:10.1111/j.1478-1913.2005.00088.x.
