= Şah Sultan (daughter of Selim II) =

Ottoman princess (c.1543–1580)

- Born: c. 1543; Karaman, Ottoman Empire
- Died: 3 November 1580 (aged 36–37); Constantinople, Ottoman Empire (present day Istanbul, Turkey)
- Burial: Zal Mahmud Pasha Mosque
- Spouse: Çakırcıbaşı Hasan Pasha (m. 1562; died 1574) Zal Mahmud Pasha (m. 1575)
- Issue: Second marriage Fülane Hanımsultan; Sultanzade Köse Hüsrev Pasha
- House: Ottoman
- Father: Selim II
- Mother: Nurbanu Sultan
- Religion: Sunni Islam

Şah Sultan (Ottoman Turkish: شاہ سلطان; c. 1543 – 3 November 1580) was an Ottoman princess, the daughter of Selim II (reign 1566–74) and Nurbanu Sultan. She was the granddaughter of Suleiman the Magnificent (reign 1520–66) and his consort Hürrem Sultan, sister of Sultan Murad III (reign 1574–95) and the aunt of Sultan Mehmed III (reign 1595–1603).

== Life ==
Şah Sultan was born in 1543 in Karaman, when her father was still a prince.

In 1562, strong alliances were made for the daughters of Şehzade Selim, the prince who would succeed Suleiman as Selim II. On 17 August 1562, Ismihan married Sokollu Mehmed Pasha, Gevherhan the admiral Piyale Pasha, and Şah the chief falconer Hasan Agha. The State Treasury covered the expenses for the imperial wedding and granted 15,000 florins as a wedding gift to the imperial son-in-law. Şah and Hasan didn't have issue.

After the death of Hasan Agha in 1574, Şah Sultan married Zal Mahmud Pasha in 1575. Apparently, this was a love marriage chosen by Şah. This union was said to be a very happy one, as the couple was well suited for each other. They had a daughter and a son.

== Death ==
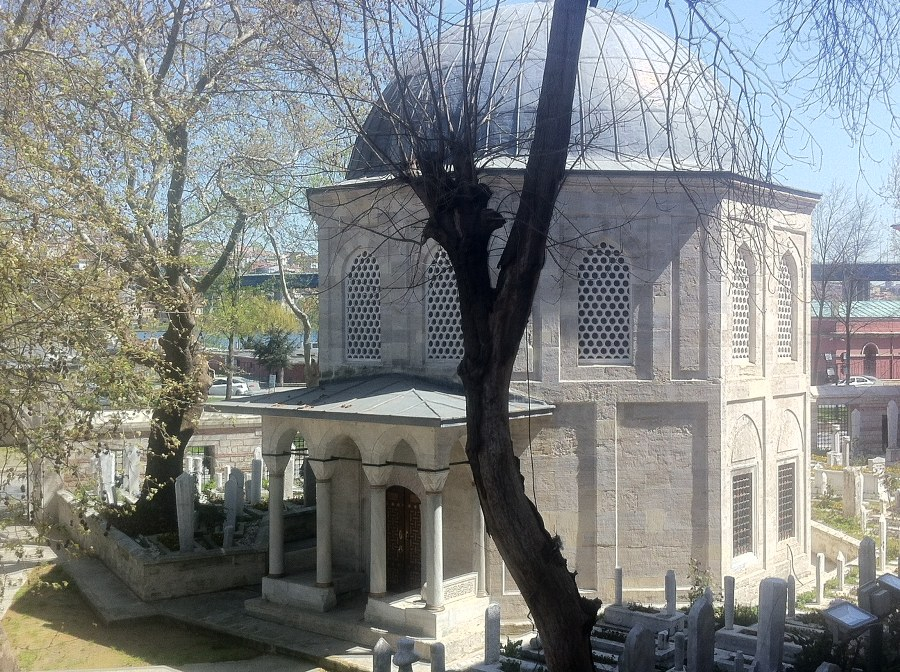
The tombs of Şah Sultan and her husband Zal Mahmud Pasha in Eyüpsultan

Şah Sultan died on 3 November 1580, and was buried in the mosque she and her husband built. It was said that Şah and her husband fell ill at the same time, lay in their deathbeds together, and breathed their last at the very same moment. In reality, Zal Mahmud Pasha died 12 days after her, and was buried with Şah.

== Issue ==
Şah had a daughter and a son from her second marriage:

- Fülane Hanımsultan (1575 - 1660). She married Abdâl Hân, Emir of Bitlis, and had two sons:
  - Zeyneddin Bey. Described as tall, noble and dark-eyed, he was made Khan of Van by Melek Ahmed Pasha on 31 July 1655. He was killed by his half-brother Nuhreddin, who was then in turn convicted and executed by Abdal Han.
  - Şerefeddin Bey, better known as Emir Sharaf Khan VI.
- Sultanzade Köse Husrev Pasha (1576/1577 - ?), who died in war versus the Savafids Persians.

== Sources ==
- Uluçay, Mustafa Çağatay (2011). Padişahların kadınları ve kızları. Ankara, Ötüken.
- Peirce, Leslie P. (1993). The Imperial Harem: Women and Sovereignty in the Ottoman Empire. Oxford University Press. ISBN 978-0-195-08677-5.
- Sakaoğlu, Necdet (2008). Bu mülkün kadın sultanları: Vâlide sultanlar, hâtunlar, hasekiler, kadınefendiler, sultanefendiler. Oğlak Yayıncılık. ISBN 978-9-753-29623-6.
