= Cerrah Mehmed Pasha =

Grand Vizier of the Ottoman Empire from 1598 to 1599

Grand Vizier of the Ottoman Empire
- In office 9 April 1598 – 6 January 1599
- Monarch: Mehmed III
- Preceded by: Hadım Hasan Pasha
- Succeeded by: Damat Ibrahim Pasha

Personal details
- Died: January 1604 Istanbul, Ottoman Empire
- Spouse: Gevherhan Sultan (m. 1579)
- Children: Sultanzade Salih Bey

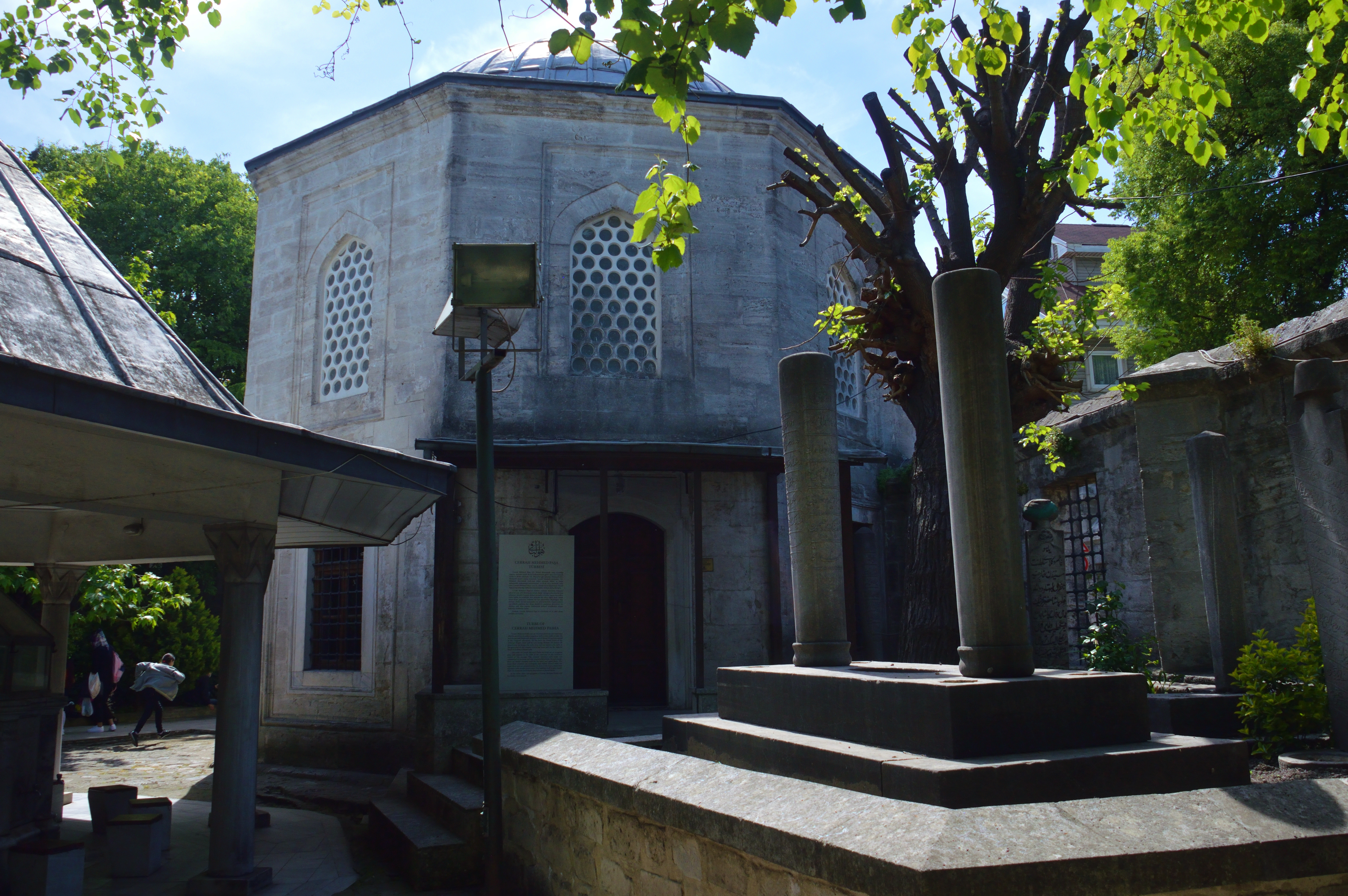
Cerrah Mehmed Pasha Mosque

Cerrah Mehmed Pasha (Ottoman Turkish: جراح محمد پاشا; died January 1604, Istanbul) was an Ottoman statesman. He was grand vizier of the Ottoman Empire from 1598 to 1599.

Mehmed Pasha was the palace surgeon prior to becoming grand vizier, hence his epithet cerrah ('surgeon'). The Istanbul neighborhood of Cerrahpaşa and one of the two medical faculties of Istanbul University, Cerrahpaşa Medical Faculty (the other being Istanbul Medical Faculty), are named after him.

== Family ==
In 1579 he married Gevherhan Sultan, a daughter of Sultan Selim II and Nurbanu Sultan. He was her second husband. She was previously married to Piali Pasha, from 1562 until his death in 1578.

Mehmed Pasha had at least one son with her:

- Sultanzade Salih Bey. Governor of Klis.

== See also ==
- List of Ottoman grand viziers

Political offices
Preceded by Hadım Hasan Pasha	Grand Vizier of the Ottoman Empire; 9 April 1598 – 6 January 1599	Succeeded by Damat Ibrahim Pasha
