= Ismihan Sultan =

Ottoman princess (1545–1585)

- Born: 1545; Manisa, Ottoman Empire
- Died: 8 August 1585 (aged 39–40); Constantinople, Ottoman Empire (present day Istanbul, Turkey)
- Burial: Selim II Mausoleum, Hagia Sophia, Istanbul
- Spouse: Sokollu Mehmed Pasha (m. 1562; died 1579) Kalaylıkoz Ali Pasha (m. 1584; died 1585)
- Issue: First marriage; Safiye Hanımsultan; Sultanzade Ahmed Bey; Sultanzade Sokolluzade Ibrahim Pasha; Sultanzade Piri Mehmed Bey; Second marriage; Sultanzade Mahmud Bey
Names
- Turkish: Ismihan Sultan; Ottoman Turkish: اسمیخان سلطان
- Dynasty: Ottoman
- Father: Selim II
- Mother: Nurbanu Sultan
- Religion: Sunni Islam

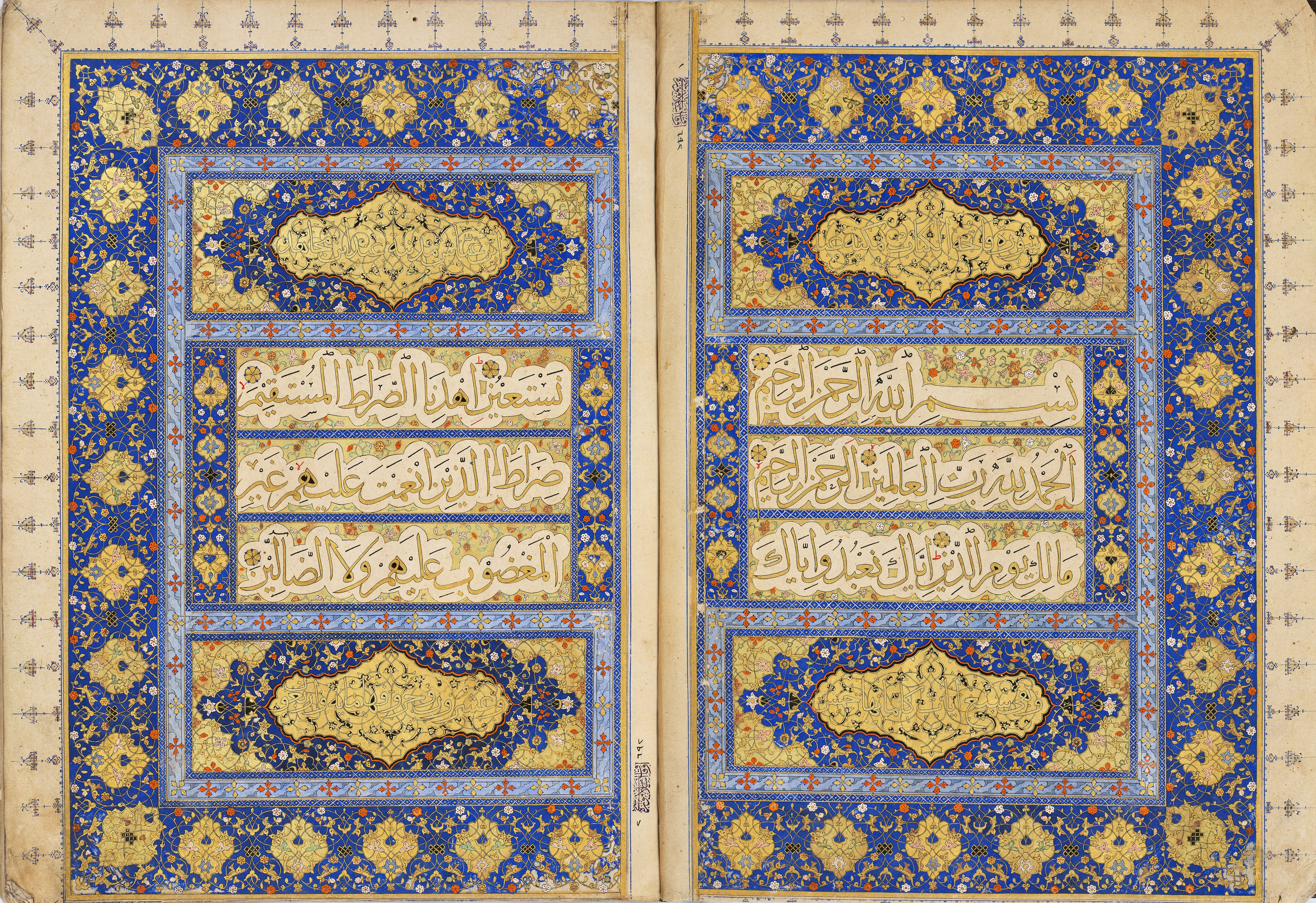
Opening pages from the Qur'an probably meant for the Selim I (1512–1520), perhaps to celebrate his conquest of Mamluk Egypt and Syria in 1517. Seventy years later this luxurious manuscript was dedicated to the mausoleum of her father, Selim II (1566–1574), by great-granddaughter of Selim I, Ismihan Sultan. Dated September 1517. Turkish and Islamic Arts Museum

Ismihan Sultan (Ottoman Turkish: اسمیخان سلطان; also Esmehan Sultan; 1545 – 8 August 1585) was an Ottoman princess, daughter of Sultan Selim II (reign 1566–74) and Nurbanu Sultan. She was the granddaughter of Suleiman the Magnificent (reign 1520–66) and his favourite consort Hürrem Sultan, sister of Sultan Murad III (reign 1574–95) and the aunt of Sultan Mehmed III (reign 1595–1603).

== Early years ==
Born in Manisa in 1545, Ismihan was the daughter of Şehzade Selim (future Sultan Selim II), son of Sultan Suleiman the Magnificent and Hürrem Sultan, and his favorite concubine and later Haseki and legal wife, Nurbanu Sultan. She spent her early life in Manisa and Konya, where her father served as a sanjak-bey. She was described as not being particularly beautiful.

== First marriage ==
In 1562, strong alliances were made for the daughters of Şehzade Selim, the prince who would succeed Suleiman as Selim II. On 17 August 1562, Ismihan married the renowned Ottoman Grand Vizier Sokollu Mehmed Pasha, while her sisters Gevherhan Sultan married the admiral Piyale Pasha, and Şah Sultan the chief falconer Hasan Agha. It was widely reported that her father was particularly happy to give Ismihan's hand to Sokollu as a reward for the vizier's help in his succession struggle with his brother Şehzade Bayezid. The State Treasury covered the expenses for the imperial wedding and granted 15,000 florins as a wedding gift to the imperial son-in-law.

The Ragusans remarked on the marriage of Ismihan and Sokollu Mehmed Pasha, according to which he was awed by the sultana no less than others were by him. She frequently referred to him as “Vlach, in other words, a most vile rustic” (Murlacco, che vuol dire contadino vilissimo). The couple owned two palaces, one located in Kadırga, and the other one located in Üsküdar. The two together had three sons and a daughter.

== Second marriage ==
After the death of her first husband, the grand vizier Sokollu Mehmed Pasha in 1579, the princess's first choice for a new husband was Ösdemiroğlu Osman Pasha. However, he was not interested. Her next choice was Kalaylıkoz Ali Pasha, the governor of Buda, who agreed to the marriage, but when the imperial order came demanding his divorce, his wife's sorrow and suffering were said to have caused the city to revolt. However, the two married in 1584 and had a son, Sultanzade Mahmud Bey born in 1585.

== Court career ==
In 1575, just after her brother, the Sultan Murad III, ascended to the throne, Ismihan's daily stipend consisted of 300 aspers.

In the early 1580s, Ismihan collaborated with her mother Nurbanu to further isolate Safiye Sultan politically. After which Murad accepted as a gift from her, two beautiful slave women, each skilled at dance and musical performance.

When French refused to return two Turkish women who had been captured at sea by Henry III's brother-in-law and made members of Catherine de' Medici's court, Ismihan and her powerful aunt, Mihrimah Sultan, interceded on behalf of the Turkish women.

== Charities ==
Ismihan commissioned a mosque located near the Hippodrome, bearing the name of Sokollu Mehmed Pasha, who was responsible for the religious college and dervish hostel associated with it. She also commissioned another mosque in her name in Mangalia, Romania, and endowed a library in her own madrasa in Eyüp. Peasants on royal endowment land were accorded privileged treatment, and the inhabitants of the Bulgarian village of Bobosevo, which had formed part of the holdings of Ismihan, today still remember that their village was under the protection of a princess (“under the veil of a Sultana”).

== Death ==
Ismihan Sultan died of complications in childbirth on 8 August 1585, three days after giving birth prematurely to her son, and was buried in the mausoleum of her father located in Hagia Sophia. Her newborn son, Mahmud, would outlive her by no more than fifty days.

== Issue ==
Only two of Ismihan's five children survived after infancy.

From her first marriage, Ismihan had a daughter and three sons:

- Safiye Hanımsultan (1563 – 24 January 1593). Ismihan Sultan's eldest child. She was firstly married to her father's cousin Sokollu Mustafa Pasha, governor of Buda. After his execution in 1578, she married the new governor of Buda, Silahdar Cafer Pasha. After his death in 1587, she gave birth to their twin sons, Mehmed Bey and Cafer Bey, who died as children. She married thirdly to Sultanzade Abdülbaki Bey, son of her mother's cousin Hümaşah Sultan.
- Sultanzade Ahmed Bey (1564 – 1567). Died in infancy, probably of smallpox.
- Sultanzade Sokolluzâde Ibrahim Han Pasha (1565 – 1621). In 1924, one of his descendants, Sokolluzade Abdülbâki Ihsân Bey, married another Ottoman princess, Rukiye Sultan, granddaughter of Sultan Mehmed V.
- Sultanzade Piri Mehmed Bey (1566 – 1567). Died in early infancy, probably of smallpox.

From her second marriage, Ismihan had a son:

- Sultanzade Mahmud Bey (5 August 1585 – 24 September 1585). Ismihan died giving birth to him. He died 50 days after his mother.

== Sources ==
- Peirce, Leslie P. (1993). The Imperial Harem: Women and Sovereignty in the Ottoman Empire. Oxford University Press. ISBN 978-0-195-08677-5.
- Uluçay, Mustafa Çağatay (2011). Padişahların kadınları ve kızları. Ankara, Ötüken.
- Sakaoğlu, Necdet (2008). Bu mülkün kadın sultanları: Vâlide sultanlar, hâtunlar, hasekiler, kadınefendiler, sultanefendiler. Oğlak Yayıncılık. ISBN 978-9-753-29623-6.
- Kayaalp, Pinar (9 April 2018). The Empress Nurbanu and Ottoman Politics in the Sixteenth Century: Building the Atik Valide. Taylor & Francis. ISBN 978-1-351-59661-9.
- Miović, Vesna (2018-05-02). "Per favore della Soltana: moćne osmanske žene i dubrovački diplomati". Anali Zavoda Za Povijesne Znanosti Hrvatske Akademije Znanosti i Umjetnosti U Dubrovniku (in Croatian). 56 (56/1): 147–197. doi:10.21857/mwo1vczp2y. ISSN 1330-0598.
