= Gevherhan Sultan (daughter of Selim II) =

Ottoman princess

- Born: c. 1544; Manisa, Ottoman Empire
- Died: after 1622; Constantinople, Ottoman Empire
- Burial: Hagia Sophia Mosque, Istanbul
- Spouse: Piali Pasha (m. 1562; died 1578) Cerrah Mehmed Pasha (m. 1579; died 1604)
- Issue: first marriage; Ayşe Atike Hanımsultan; Sultanzade Mehmed Pasha; Sultanzade Mustafa Bey; Fatma Hanımsultan; Hatice Hanımsultan; second marriage; Sultanzade Salih Bey
Names
- Turkish: Gevherhan Sultan; Ottoman Turkish: کوهرخان سلطان
- Dynasty: Ottoman
- Father: Selim II
- Mother: Nurbanu Sultan
- Religion: Sunni Islam

Gevherhan Sultan (Ottoman Turkish: کوھرخان سلطان; c. 1544 – after 1622) was an Ottoman princess, the daughter of Sultan Selim II (r. 1566–1574) and Nurbanu Sultan. She was the granddaughter of Suleiman the Magnificent (r. 1520–1566) and Hürrem Sultan, sister of Sultan Murad III (r. 1574–1595) and the aunt of Sultan Mehmed III (r. 1595–1603).

== Early life ==
Gevherhan Sultan was born in Manisa in 1544. Her father was Şehzade Selim (future Selim II), son of Sultan Suleiman the Magnificent and Hürrem Sultan and mother was Nurbanu Sultan. She spent her early life in Manisa and Konya, where her father served as a sanjak-bey.

She had an older sister, Şah Sultan and a younger sister, Ismihan Sultan, a younger brother, Murad III, a younger half-sister Fatma Sultan and seven younger half-brothers who were killed as infants when Murad ascended the throne.

== First marriage ==
In 1562, strong alliances were made for the daughters of Şehzade Selim, the prince who would succeed Suleiman as Selim II. On 17 August 1562, Ismihan married Sokollu Mehmed Pasha, Gevherhan the admiral Piali Pasha, and Şah the chief falconer Hasan Agha. The State Treasury covered the expenses for the imperial wedding and granted 15,000 florins as a wedding gift to the imperial son-in-law.

After the triple wedding, Mihrimah Sultan, Gevherhan's aunt, pushed assiduously for a naval campaign against Malta, enlisting the help of the grand vizier Semiz Ali Pasha, and promising to outfit four hundred ships at her own expanse. However, Suleiman and his son Selim prevented the campaign from going forward so that the admiral, Piali Pasha, might remain in Istanbul with his new wife, Gevherhan Sultan.

The two together had two sons, Sultanzade Mustafa Bey (who died in 1593) and Sultanzade Mehmed Bey and three daughters, Ayşe Atike Hanımsultan, Fatma Hanımsultan, and Hatice Hanımsultan.

In 1575, just after her brother Sultan Murad ascended to the throne her daily stipend consisted of 250 aspers. Gevherhan was widowed at Piali Pasha's death in 1578.

== Second marriage ==
In 1579, Gevherhan Sultan married Cerrah Mehmed Pasha, and they had a son, Sultanzade Salih Bey. When he was promoted from the generalship of the janissaries to the governorship of Rumelia in March 1580, people opined that it was due to the political power of Gevherhan Sultan. In 1583, he presented Handan Hatun to then Prince Mehmed (later Mehmed III) on his departure for Manisa. In 1598, when her husband was appointed the grand vizier during Mehmed III's reign, Gevherhan became an influential political figure in court circles. This position seems to have enabled her to keep in touch with Mehmed III's sons and their mothers as well. Gevherhan was known to be extremely jealous of this husband. On one occasion, she was reported to have stabbed one of her Kalfa because she believed she was provoking her husband.

Gevherhan wrote many letters to her youngest son, Sultanzade Salih Bey, who was the governor of Klis. These letters were considered so important from a political point of view that their translations were sent in Venice by the baylo. She also protected her daughter's husband Sinanpaşaoğlu Mehmed Pasha. She was on friendly terms with Süleyman Agha, the mute of Safiye Sultan.

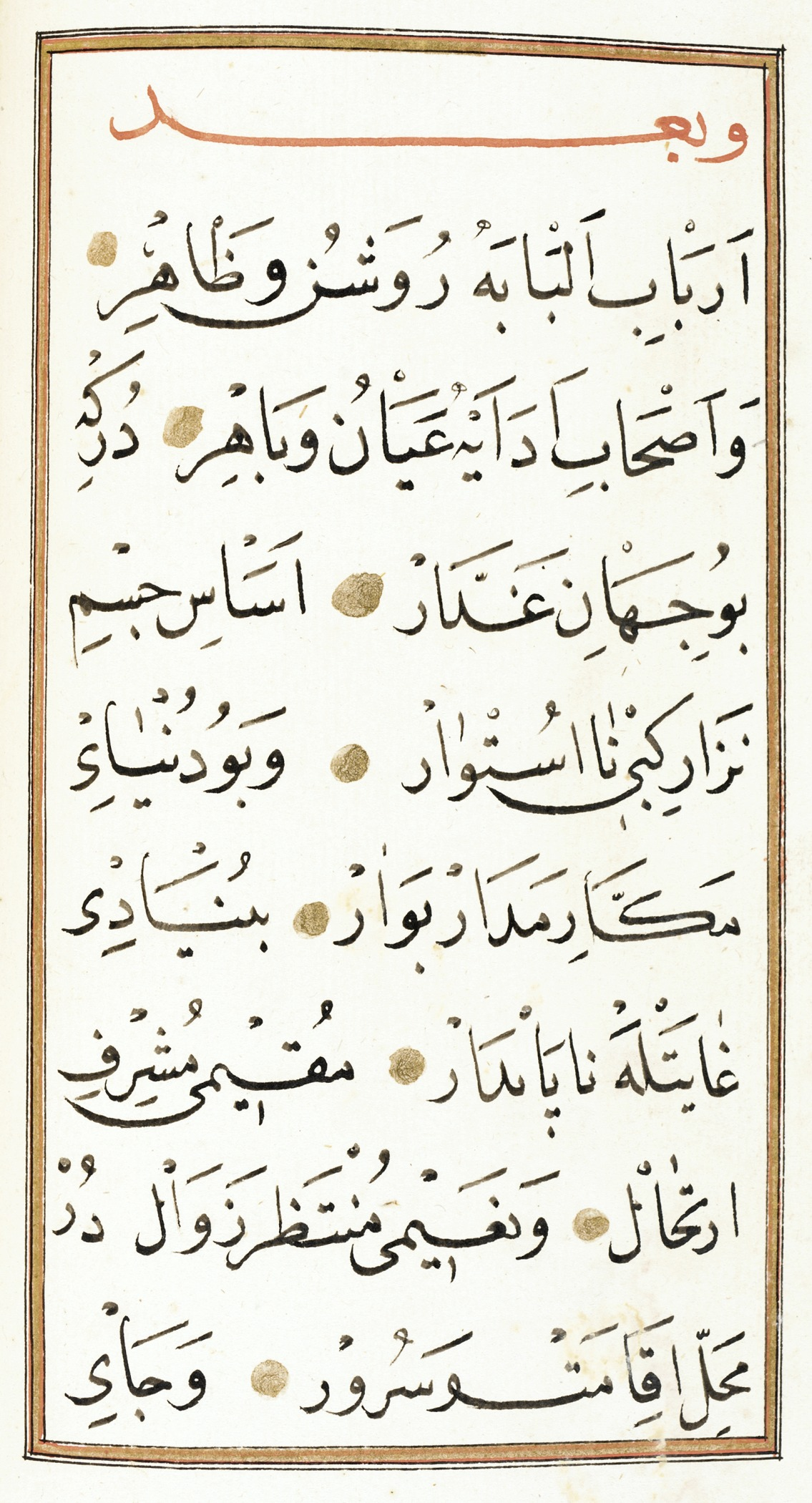
Vaqf made by Gevherhan about the baths of Eski Mosque

Soon after his succession, Ahmed I, Mehmed's son by Handan, wanted to express his gratitude to Mehmed Pasha and Gevherhan Sultan for the role they had played in bringing his parents together. By then, however, Cerrah Mehmed Pasha was old and ailing, and died on 9 January 1604. Ahmed, therefore, honored the late pasha's wife. Venetian bailo Contarini records that "having remembered this [i.e., his mother’s background], he sent the sultana [Gevherhan] a thousand gold coins and a sable robe with many other gifts as a sign of welcome, since she had been the origin of his good fortune and of the greatness in which at present he found himself."

Ahmed also named one of his daughters after Gevherhan to further mark his great-aunt's role in his life. Her daily stipend consisted of 350 aspers.

== Charities ==
From her properties she constituted a religious and charitable foundation with whose revenues built and maintained a high theological college in the İstanbul neighbourhood of Cağaloğlu.

== Death ==
She died after 1622 and was buried in the mausoleum of her father Sultan Selim II's, next to Hagia Sophia Mosque.

== Issue ==
Gevherhan had two sons and three daughters by her first marriage:

- Ayşe Atike Hanımsultan (1563 - c. 1614-1616). She was married to Doğancıbaşı Kerim Ağa. Atike died around 1614-1616, shortly before the birth of Ahmed I's daughter Atike Sultan, who was named in honor of her.
- Sultanzade Mehmed Pasha . Firstly governor of Peloponnese, until his uncle Murad III, at the request of his mother, appointed him to the position of governor of Herzegovina.
- Sultanzade Mustafa Bey (? - 1593).
- Fatma Hanımsultan. Married to some Ibrahim Bey.
- Hatice Hanımsultan. She married Sinanpashazade (Sinanpaşaoğlu) Mehmed Pasha in November 1598, until Ahmed I executed him in 1605. It is not known if she remarried. Her palace (known as Piyale Pasha Palace) was left to Ismihan Kaya Sultan (daughter of Sultan Murad IV, Ahmed I's son) after her death.

Gevherhan had a son by her second marriage:

- Sultanzade Salih Bey. Governor of Klis.

== Sources ==
- Börekçi, Günhan (2010). Factions And Favorites At The Courts Of Sultan Ahmed I (r. 1603-17) And His Immediate Predecessors (Thesis).
- Pedani, Maria Pia (2000). "Safiye's Household and Venetian Diplomacy". Turcica. 32.
- Peirce, Leslie P. (1993). The Imperial Harem: Women and Sovereignty in the Ottoman Empire. Oxford University Press. ISBN 978-0-195-08677-5.
- Sakaoğlu, Necdet (2008). Bu mülkün kadın sultanları: Vâlide sultanlar, hâtunlar, hasekiler, kadınefendiler, sultanefendiler. Oğlak Yayıncılık. ISBN 978-9-753-29623-6.
- Tezcan, Baki (November 2001). Searching for Osman: A reassessment of the deposition of the Ottoman Sultan Osman II (1618-1622). pp. 327 n. 16, 343 n. 132.
- Uluçay, Mustafa Çağatay (2011). Padişahların kadınları ve kızları. Ankara: Ötüken. ISBN 978-9-754-37840-5.
