= Defterdar Sinan Pasha =

Ottoman governor of Egypt from 1585 to 1587

- دفتردار سنان پاشا

Ottoman Governer of Egypt
- Monarch: Murad III
- Preceded by: Damat Ibrahim Pasha
- Succeeded by: Kara Üveys Pasha

Defterdar Sinan Pasha was an Ottoman statesman who served as the Ottoman governor of the Egypt Eyalet from 1585 to 1587.

He was dismissed after being unable to collect enough taxes, and was replaced by Kara Üveys Pasha.
