= Haydar Reis =

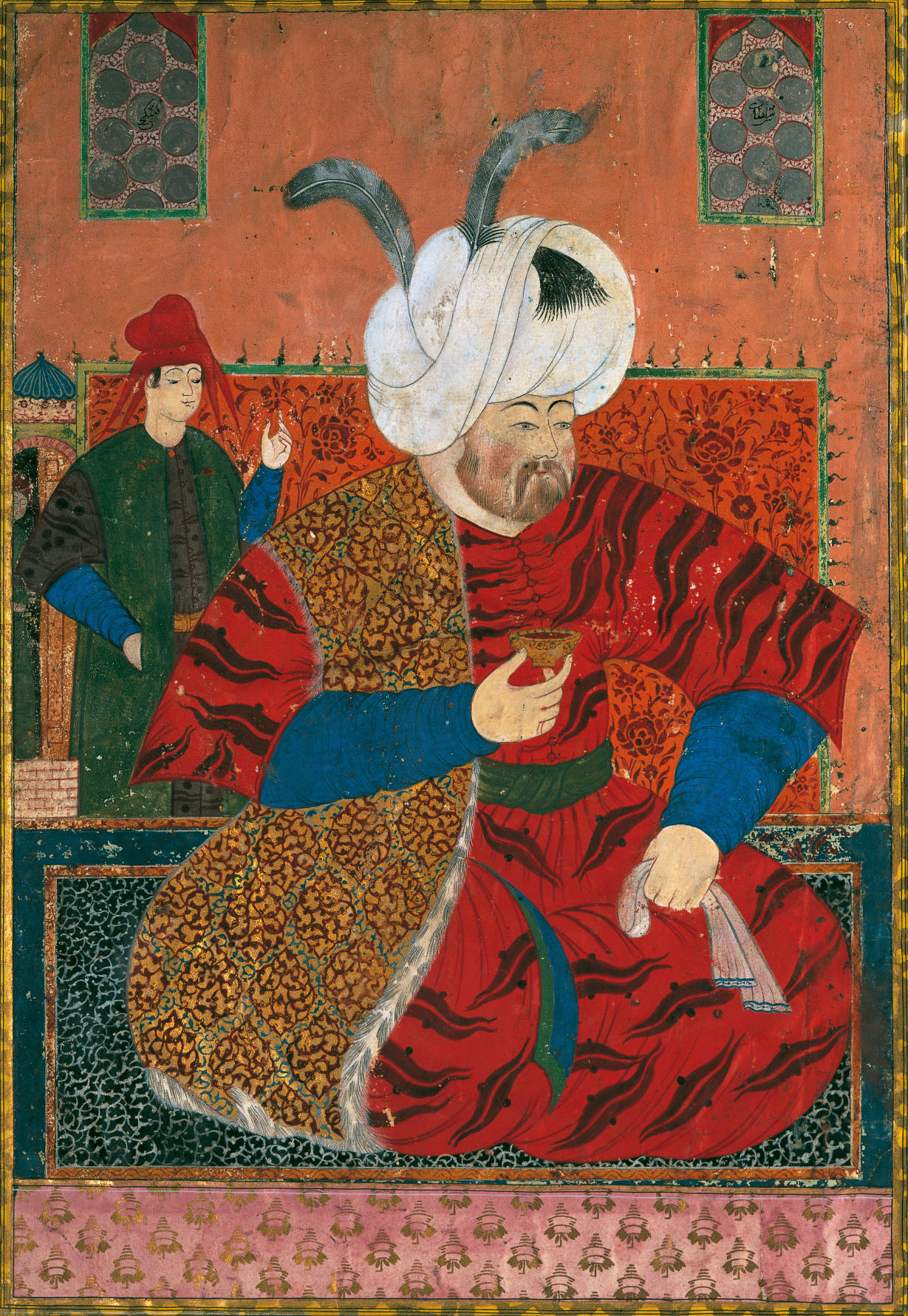
Portrait of Sultan Selim II by Haydar Reis (Nigari) c. 1570

Haydar Reis, or Ra῾is, called Nigari, the portraitist (c. 1492/4 – 1572/4), was a 16th-century Ottoman naval captain, painter and poet. His paintings, often accompanied by his own verses, include portraits of such important Ottoman figures as Suleiman the Magnificent, Hayreddin Barbarossa and Selim II, as well as contemporary European emperors and kings. Some of these individual works of art were later included in albums (muraqqa) containing works by various hands.

== Bibliography ==
- Atbaş, Zeynep (21 May 2010). "Illustrated manuscripts in the Topkapi Palace Museum". In Ágostan, Gábor; Masters, Bruce (eds.). Encyclopedia of the Ottoman Empire. Facts On File, Inc. p. 272. ISBN 978-1-4381-1025-7.
- Atil, Esin (2003). "Haydar Ra'is [Haydār Ra'īs; Haydar Reis; Nigari; Reis Haydar]". Grove Art Online. doi:10.1093/gao/9781884446054.article.T037037. ISBN 978-1-884446-05-4.
- Başkurt, A. Çağrı, Haydar Reis of Galata (Nigârî) the first naval captain painter of the Ottoman Empire and his gazavatname (H. 961/ A. D. 1553) and Dürer-i Deryâ (Pearls of the Sea), Harvard 2020 [BIOGRAPHY]
- Bloom, Jonathan M.; Blair, Sheila S., eds. (2009). "Haydar Ra῾is [Haydār Ra῾īs; Haydar Reis; Nigari; Reis Haydar]". The Grove Encyclopedia of Islamic Art and Architecture. Oxford University Press. ISBN 978-0-19-530991-1.
- Clot, André (2012). Soliman le magnifique [Suleiman the Magnificent]. Translated by Reisz, Matthew J. Saqi Books. ISBN 978-0-86356-803-9.
- Fetvaci, Emine (2013). Picturing History at the Ottoman Court. Indiana University Press. ISBN 978-0-253-05102-8.
- Venice and the Islamic World, 828–1797. Metropolitan Museum of Art. 2007. ISBN 978-0-300-12430-9.
- "Haydar Reis (called Nigari) 1494 – 1574". Harvard Art Museums.
- "Portrait of Barbaros Hayreddin Hizir Pasha (2912-020)". Yale University Library.
