= Damat Ibrahim Pasha =

Grand Vizier of the Ottoman Empire (1596, 1596–1597, 1599–1601)

Grand Vizier of the Ottoman Empire
- In office 6 January 1599 – 10 July 1601
- Monarch: Mehmed III
- Preceded by: Cerrah Mehmed Pasha
- Succeeded by: Yemişçi Hasan Pasha
- In office 5 December 1596 – 3 November 1597
- Monarch: Mehmed III
- Preceded by: Cigalazade Yusuf Sinan Pasha
- Succeeded by: Hadım Hasan Pasha
- In office 4 April 1596 – 27 October 1596
- Monarch: Mehmed III
- Preceded by: Koca Sinan Pasha
- Succeeded by: Cigalazade Yusuf Sinan Pasha

Ottoman Governor of Egypt
- In office 1583–1585
- Preceded by: Hadım Hasan Pasha
- Succeeded by: Defterdar Sinan Pasha

Personal details
- Born: 1517 Croatia or Sanjak of Bosnia, Ottoman Empire
- Died: 10 July 1601 (aged 84)
- Spouse: Ayşe Sultan (m. 1586)
- Children: Sultanzade Mehmed Bey; Fülane Hanımsultan

Damat Ibrahim Pasha (Turkish: Damat İbrahim Paşa, Serbo-Croatian: Damat Ibrahim-paša; 1517 – 10 July 1601) was an Ottoman military commander and statesman who held the office of grand vizier three times (the first time from 4 April to 27 October 1596; the second time from 5 December 1596 to 3 November 1597; and for the third and last time, from 6 January 1599 to his death on 10 July 1601). He is known as the conqueror of Kanije.

Born at Mehmed-Kanije, on 28 May 1517, he attended military schools in several cities of the Ottoman Empire before being enlisted in the Ottoman army. After graduating, he was in active service during the Battle of Keresztes in October 1596, and held the position of grand vizier under Sultan Mehmed III until his death in 1601.

He is also called with the title damat ("bridegroom"), because he was a bridegroom to the Ottoman dynasty by marrying Ayşe Sultan, one of the sultan's daughters. By her he had a son, Sultanzade Mehmed Bey (died in infancy), and a daughter (died as newborn). He is not to be confused with either Pargalı Ibrahim Pasha, illustrious grand vizier of Suleiman the Magnificent, another devşirme and to the Ottoman court, or with Nevşehirli Damat Ibrahim Pasha, who held office in early 18th century during the Tulip Era in the Ottoman Empire.

== Biography ==
According to Turkish sources, he was "Bosnian or Croatian" and went through the Devşirme system. According to the contemporary Italian historian Giovanni Minadoi, Ibrahim Pasha became acquainted with the Venetian deputy consul of Aleppo, Chrestefero de Boni, once Ibrahim Pasha discovered they were both from Ragusa in modern Croatia.

He rose in the ranks during the period when virtual authority and influence was held by Sokollu Mehmed Pasha. In 1581, shortly after Mehmed Pasha's death, Ibrahim Pasha married Ayşe, daughter of the reigning Murad III and became governor of Egypt. But due to his absence from the capital and with Sokollu Mehmed Pasha dead, his influence waned for the rest of the reign of Murad III.

He made a comeback under the reign of Mehmed III, becoming grand vizier in 1596 for the first time. His recall was particularly due to the loss of territories in the border regions between the Ottoman Empire and the Habsburg monarchy in Hungary. Rather than dashing toward immediate action, he distinguished himself as an orderly, methodical, and prudent statesman who preferred to start by conducting a review of the entire Ottoman administrative system based on the focal point of the prepared campaign against Austria. The campaign as such proved a success and the Ibrahim Pasha acquired the title of "the conqueror of Eger" (north-east of Budapest) for his sultan, although he was the one who held the effective command. Since he favored solidifying the state structure and the gains acquired rather than pursuing Austrians, for which he has been dismissed from the post of grand vizier, at first for a short interval of forty-five days at the end of 1596, and then for a second time at the end of the following year.

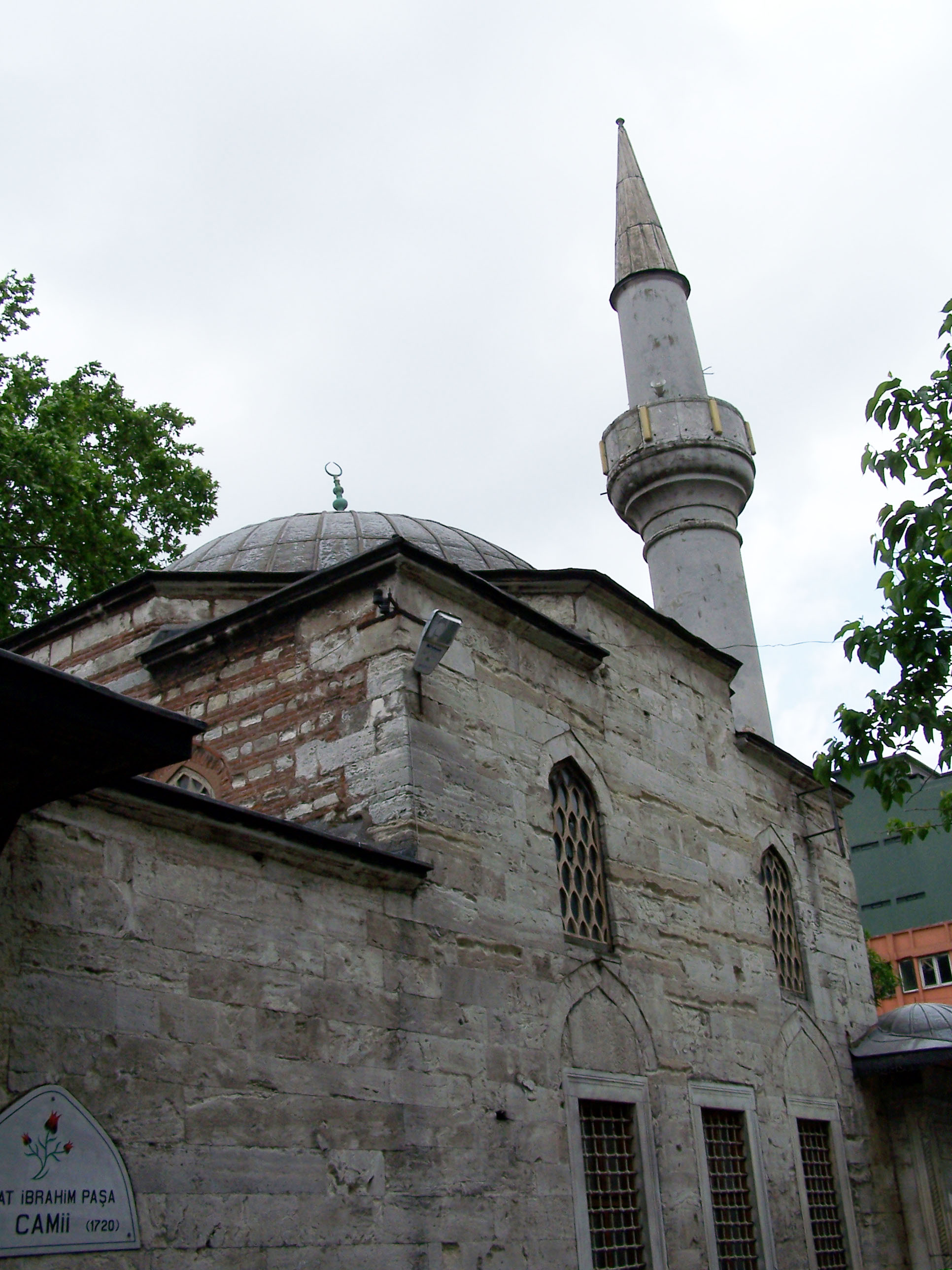
The Damat Ibrahim Pasha mosque in the Fatih district of Istanbul.

He was called back to the grand vizier post in 1599 on the condition that he was to launch a campaign against Austria. He started his campaign by feigning to menace Vienna directly by heading toward Esztergom (conquered by Suleiman the Magnificent in 1543 and lost back in 1595) but finally spent the winter in Belgrade. Then he began to put pressure on Austria through a more southern route by besieging the castle of Kanije. The Ottoman slaves in the castle exploded the powder magazines and very badly damaged the walls. But the castle had still not surrendered and an army of 20,000 soldiers commanded by Philippe Emmanuel, Duke of Mercœur arrived to the assistance of the besieged. But the Ottoman Army finally defeated both of the armies and the castle surrendered. Tiryaki Hasan Pasha was appointed as the governor of the newly conquered city.

Kanije had been transformed into the centre of new Ottoman attacks in Central Europe. In September 1601, an attempt by a huge Austrian army to take back the castle was thwarted by the governor Tiryaki Hasan Pasha. Damat Ibrahim Pasha died the same year. Esztergom was retaken by the Ottoman Empire in 1605 under Sultan Ahmed I.

== See also ==
- List of Ottoman grand viziers
- List of Ottoman governors of Egypt
- Pictures of the mosque in Istanbul
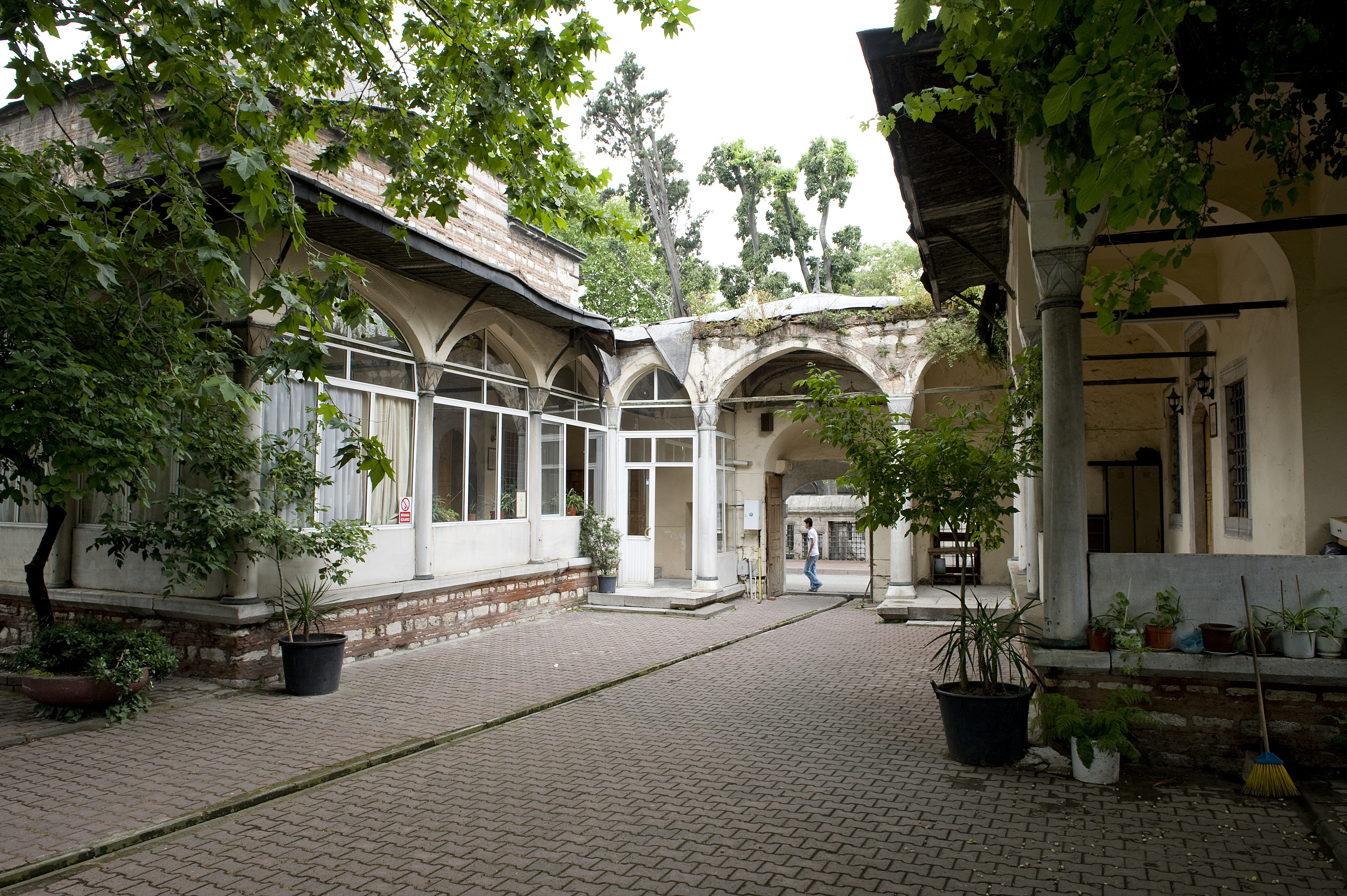
Damat Ibrahim Mosque area entrance

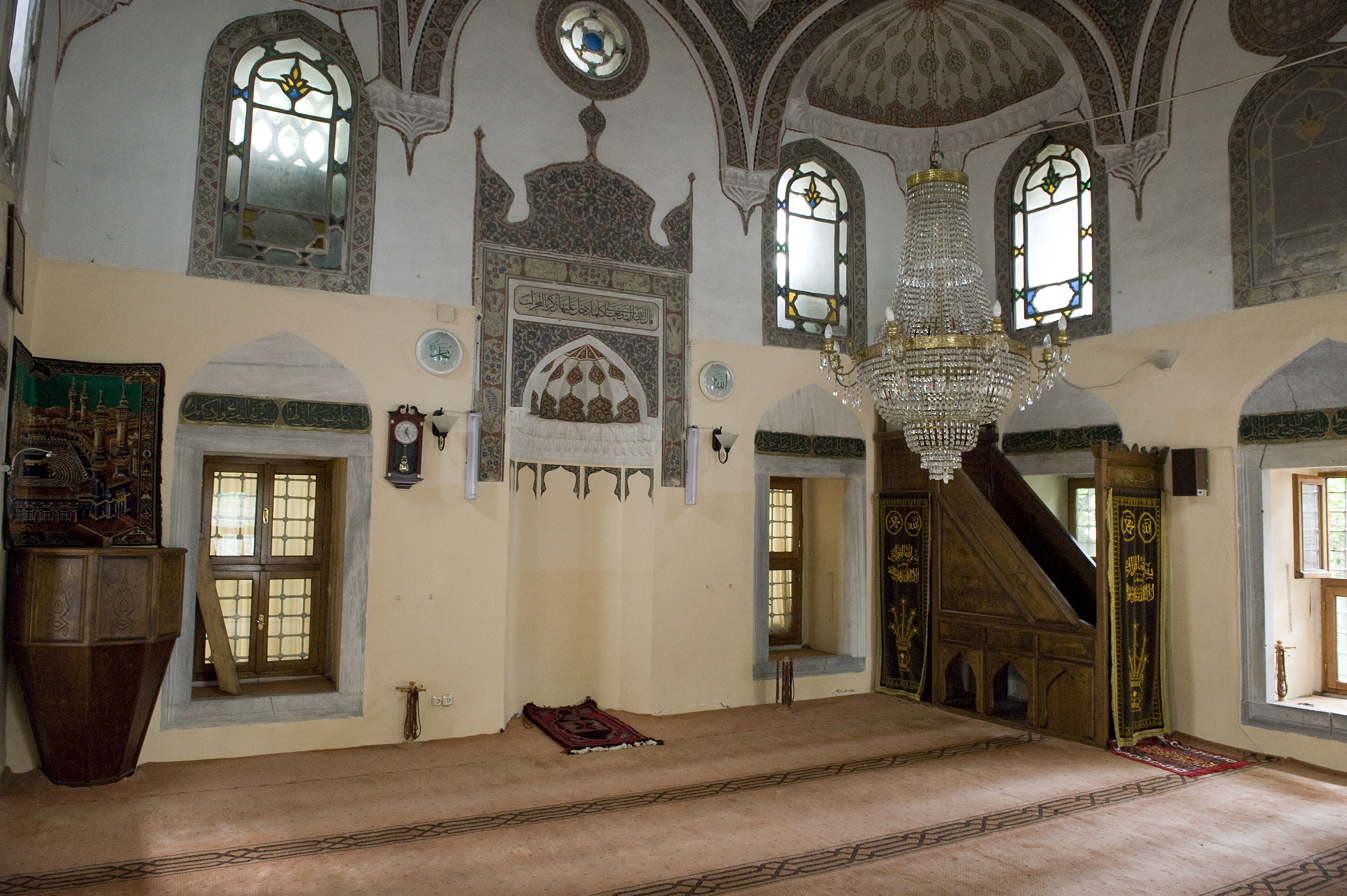
Damat Ibrahim Mosque interior

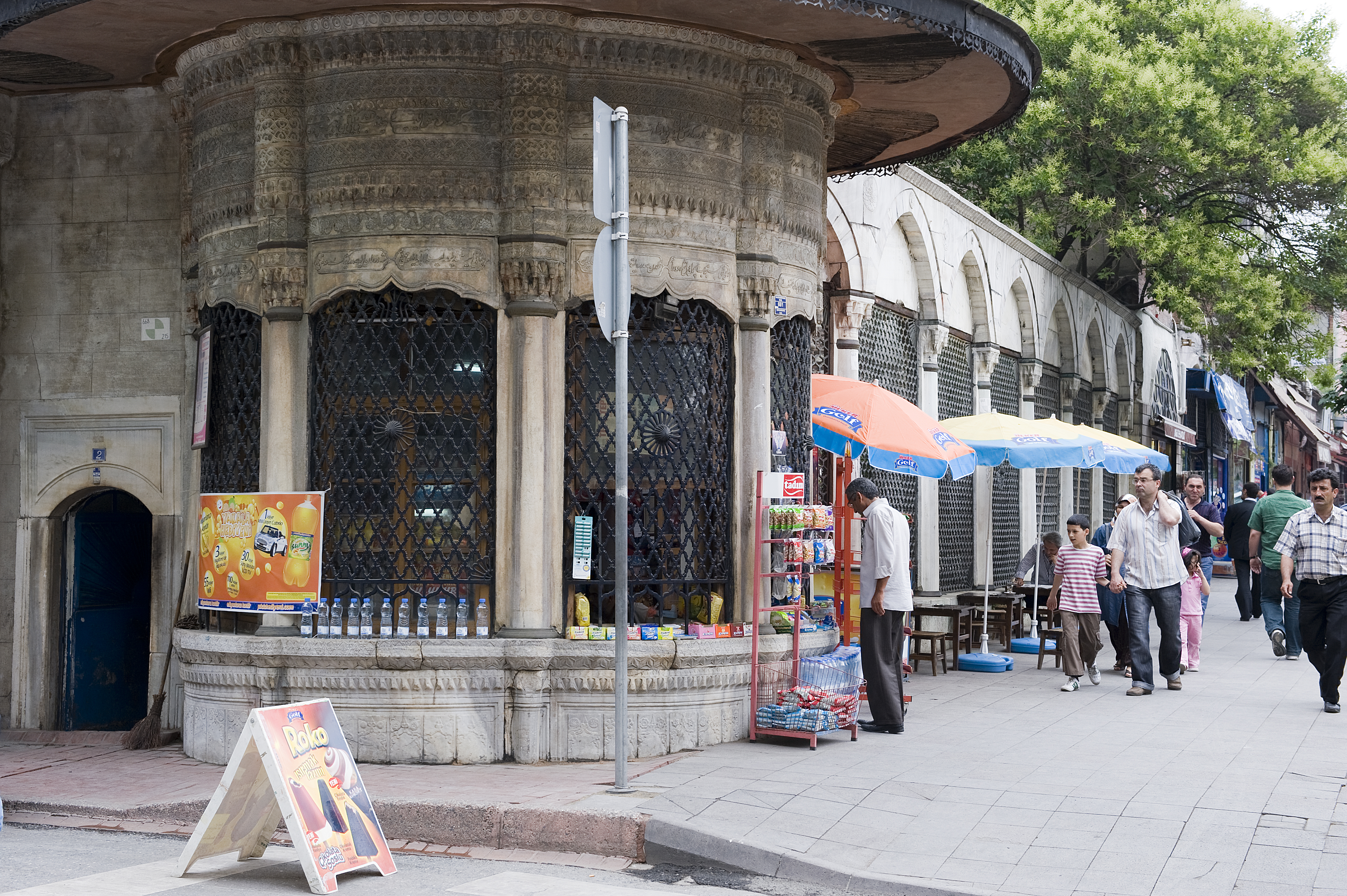
Damat Ibrahim Mosque sebil

Political offices
Preceded by Hadım Hasan Pasha	Ottoman Governor of Egypt; 1583–1585	Succeeded by Defterdar Sinan Pasha
Preceded by Koca Sinan Pasha	Grand Vizier of the Ottoman Empire; 4 April 1596 – 27 October 1596	Succeeded by Cigalazade Yusuf Sinan Pasha
Preceded by Cigalazade Yusuf Sinan Pasha	Grand Vizier of the Ottoman Empire; 4 December 1596 – 3 November 1597	Succeeded by Hadım Hasan Pasha
Preceded by Cerrah Mehmed Pasha	Grand Vizier of the Ottoman Empire; 6 January 1599 – 10 July 1601	Succeeded by Yemişçi Hasan Pasha
