= Hadım Hasan Pasha =

Grand Vizier of the Ottoman Empire from 1597 to 1598

Hadım Hasan Pasha (Ottoman Turkish: خادم حسن پاشا; died 1598 in Constantinople) was an Ottoman statesman. He was an Albanian Grand Vizier of the Ottoman Empire from 1597 to 1598. He was also the Ottoman governor of Egypt from 1580 to 1583.

== See also ==
- List of Ottoman grand viziers
- List of Ottoman governors of Egypt

Political offices
Preceded by Hadim Mesih Pasha	Ottoman Governor of Egypt; 1580–1583	Succeeded by Damat Ibrahim Pasha
Preceded by Damat Ibrahim Pasha	Grand Vizier of the Ottoman Empire; 3 November 1597 – 9 April 1598	Succeeded by Cerrah Mehmed Pasha
