= Selim II =

Sultan of the Ottoman Empire from 1566 to 1574

- Custodian of the Two Holy Mosques
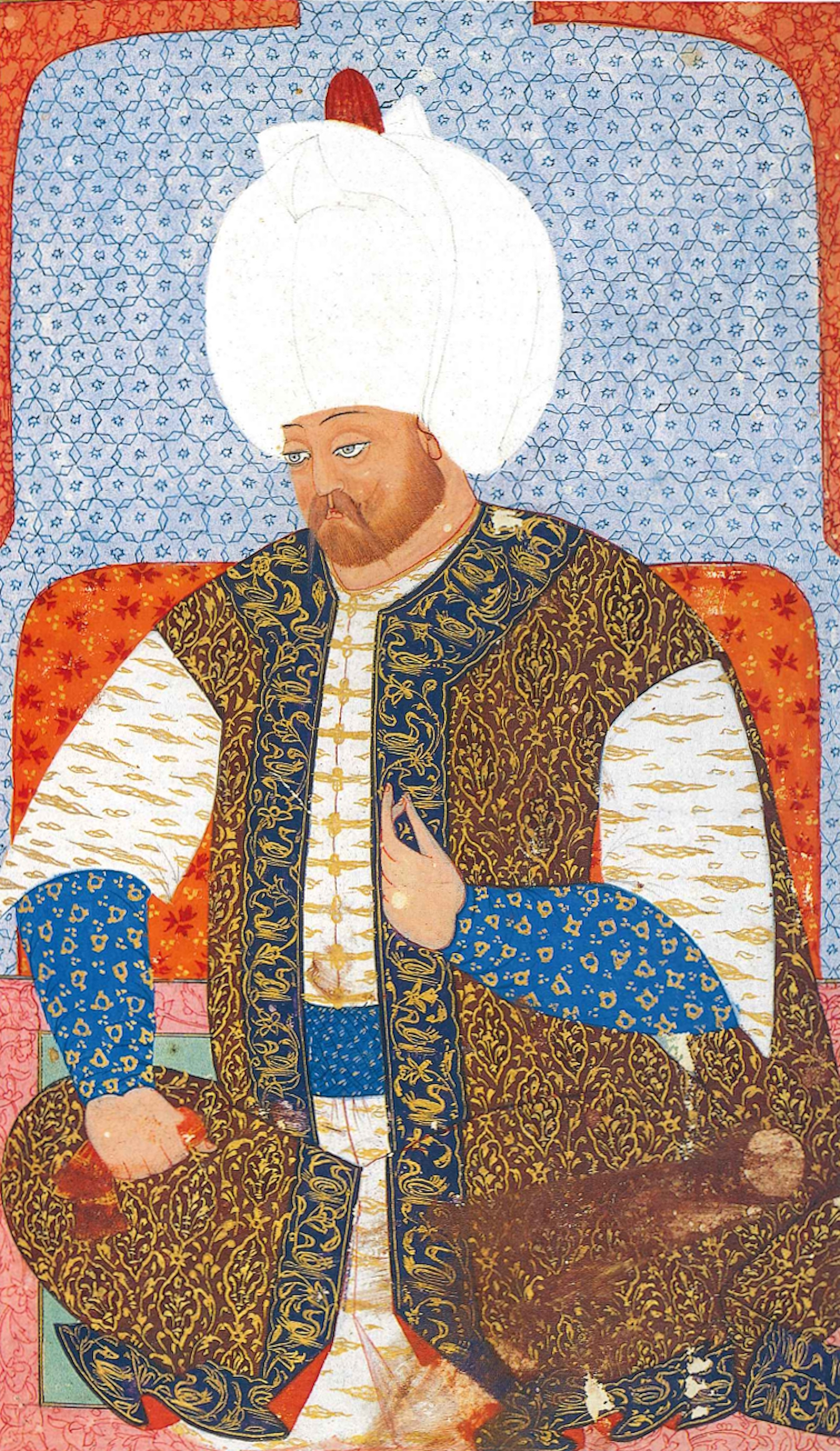

Sultan of the Ottoman Empire (Padishah)
- Reign: 7 September 1566 – 15 December 1574
- Sword girding: 29 September 1566
- Predecessor: Suleiman I
- Successor: Murad III

Ottoman caliph (Amir al-Mu'minin)
- Predecessor: Suleiman I
- Successor: Murad III
- Born: 28 May 1524; Old Palace, Constantinople, Ottoman Empire
- Died: 15 December 1574 (aged 50); Topkapı Palace, Constantinople, Ottoman Empire
- Burial: Hagia Sophia, Istanbul
- Spouse: Nurbanu Sultan (m. 1571)
- Issue Among others: Şah Sultan; Gevherhan Sultan; Ismihan Sultan; Murad III; Fatma Sultan
Names
- Selim Şah bin Süleyman Şah Han
- Dynasty: Ottoman
- Father: Suleiman I
- Mother: Hürrem Sultan
- Religion: Sunni Islam
- Tughra

Selim II (Ottoman Turkish: سليم ثانى, romanized: Selīm-i sānī; Turkish: II. Selim; 28 May 1524 – 15 December 1574), also known as Selim the Blond (Turkish: Sarı Selim) or Selim the Drunkard (Sarhoş Selim), was the Sultan of the Ottoman Empire from 1566 until his death in 1574.

During his reign, his grand vizier Sokollu Mehmed Pasha played a prominent role in the administration of the empire. The conquest of Cyprus and Tunis were notable achievements, though the Ottoman navy was defeated at the battle of Lepanto.

== Early years ==
Selim was born on 28 May 1524 in the Topkapı Palace, Constantinople. He was the second surviving son of Sultan Suleiman the Magnificent and his concubine Hürrem Sultan. His mother was freed sometime between 1533 and 1534 and subsequently became Suleiman's legal wife.

Selim's siblings were predominantly the children of Hürrem Sultan. His full brothers were his older brother Şehzade Mehmed and his younger brothers Şehzade Bayezid, Şehzade Abdullah and Şehzade Cihangir, while his older full sister was Mihrimah Sultan. He also had an elder paternal half-brother, Şehzade Mustafa, the oldest surviving son of Suleiman and his concubine Mahidevran Hatun.

In June and July 1530, Constantinople hosted a three-week celebration for the circumcision of Selim, his elder half-brother Mustafa and his full brother Mehmed. The three princes were circumcised on 27 June 1530. The festivities featured military displays, simulated battles, performances by jugglers and strongmen and reenactments of recent Ottoman victories. Suleiman the Magnificent watched the celebrations from a loggia overlooking the Hippodrome, while his Grand Vizier, Pargalı Ibrahim Pasha, played a prominent role in organizing the festivities and presented lavish gifts to the sultan and the princes.

In May 1537, Selim accompanied his father, together with his brother Mehmed, during Suleiman's campaign against Corfu. This was the first military campaign in which Suleiman's sons participated, symbolizing the continuation of the Ottoman dynasty. In 1540, Suleiman took Selim with his brother Mehmed with him to Edirne, where they spent the winter. In June 1541, the two princes again accompanied their father with their younger brother Bayezid, this time during his campaign to Buda.

In 1542, Selim was appointed governor of Karaman, with Konya as his seat. Following the unexpected death of his brother Mehmed in November 1543, Selim was appointed governor of Saruhan in the spring of 1544, taking up residence in Manisa. The appointment placed him in one of the most important provincial posts traditionally associated with Ottoman princes.

In the summer of 1544, Selim reunited with his family in Bursa, where he was joined by his parents, Suleiman and Hürrem Sultan, his sister Mihrimah Sultan and her husband, Rüstem Pasha. During Suleiman's 1548–1549 campaign against the Safavids, Selim was sent to Edirne to represent his father and oversee affairs in the sultan's absence.

In 1553, he accompanied Suleiman during his campaign against the Safavids. During the expedition, his elder half-brother Mustafa was executed on Suleiman's order in September 1553. Mustafa's execution dramatically altered the balance of succession among Suleiman's surviving sons and eventually left Selim and his younger brother Bayezid as the principal contenders for the throne since their younger brother Cihangir also died in October 1553.

== Succession struggle ==
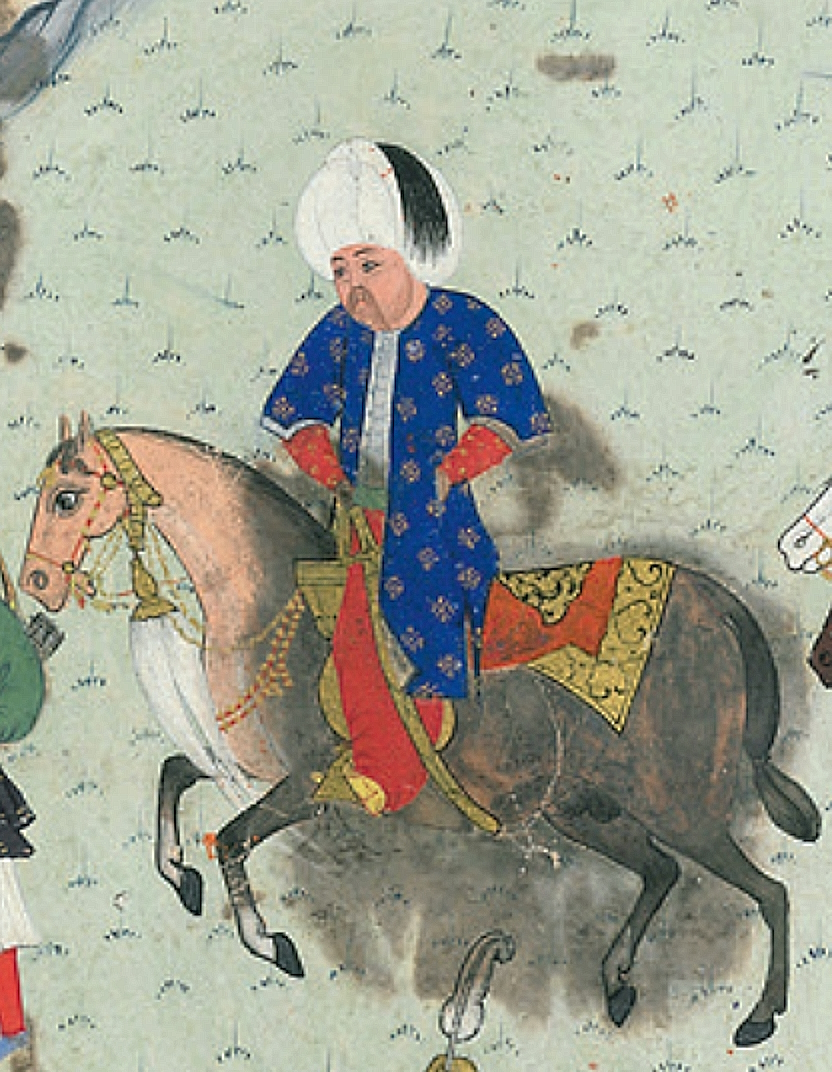
Equestrian portrait of Prince Selim riding between Kotahia and Belgrade to rejoin the Imperial Army in early 1566 Siege of Szigetvár. His father would die, and Prince Selim would become "Sultan Selim II" later that year. Nüzhet (TSMK H.1339, 1569).

In 1555 a rebellion erupted in northeastern Bulgaria, led by a man claiming to be Şehzade Mustafa. He organised his followers like the Ottoman administration, redistributing taxes and gaining support. Bayezid, aware of the situation, prepared militarily and initiated negotiations. Suleiman sent Sokullu Mehmed Pasha to suppress the uprising. Bayezid's envoy convinced the pretender's chief vizier to defect, leading to the leader's capture and execution in Constantinople on 31 July 1555. Rumors suggested Bayezid orchestrated the revolt, but Suleiman's desire to punish him was hindered by his wife Hürrem. Tensions over succession continued, with Bayezid and Selim in rivalry. Strategic maneuvers, including Bayezid's relocation to Germiyan, maintained equilibrium in their positions, both poised to return to the capital upon news of their father's fate.

Suleiman's persistent health concerns prompted efforts to dispel rumors of imminent death. In June 1557, the French ambassador noted Suleiman's strategic display of vitality upon returning to Constantinople, countering speculations about succession plans. The dynamics shifted decisively after Hürrem's death in April 1558, known for mediating between her sons. Suleiman aimed to secure the cooperation of his sons, Selim and Bayezid, in a plan to reassign them to new, distant governorates. The proposal involved moving Selim from Manisa to Konya and relocating Bayezid from Kütahya to the remote town of Amasya. Both brothers' sons were also granted governorships in smaller counties adjacent to their fathers' assignments. In September, Suleiman reassigned his sons, sending Selim to Konya and Bayezid to Amasya.

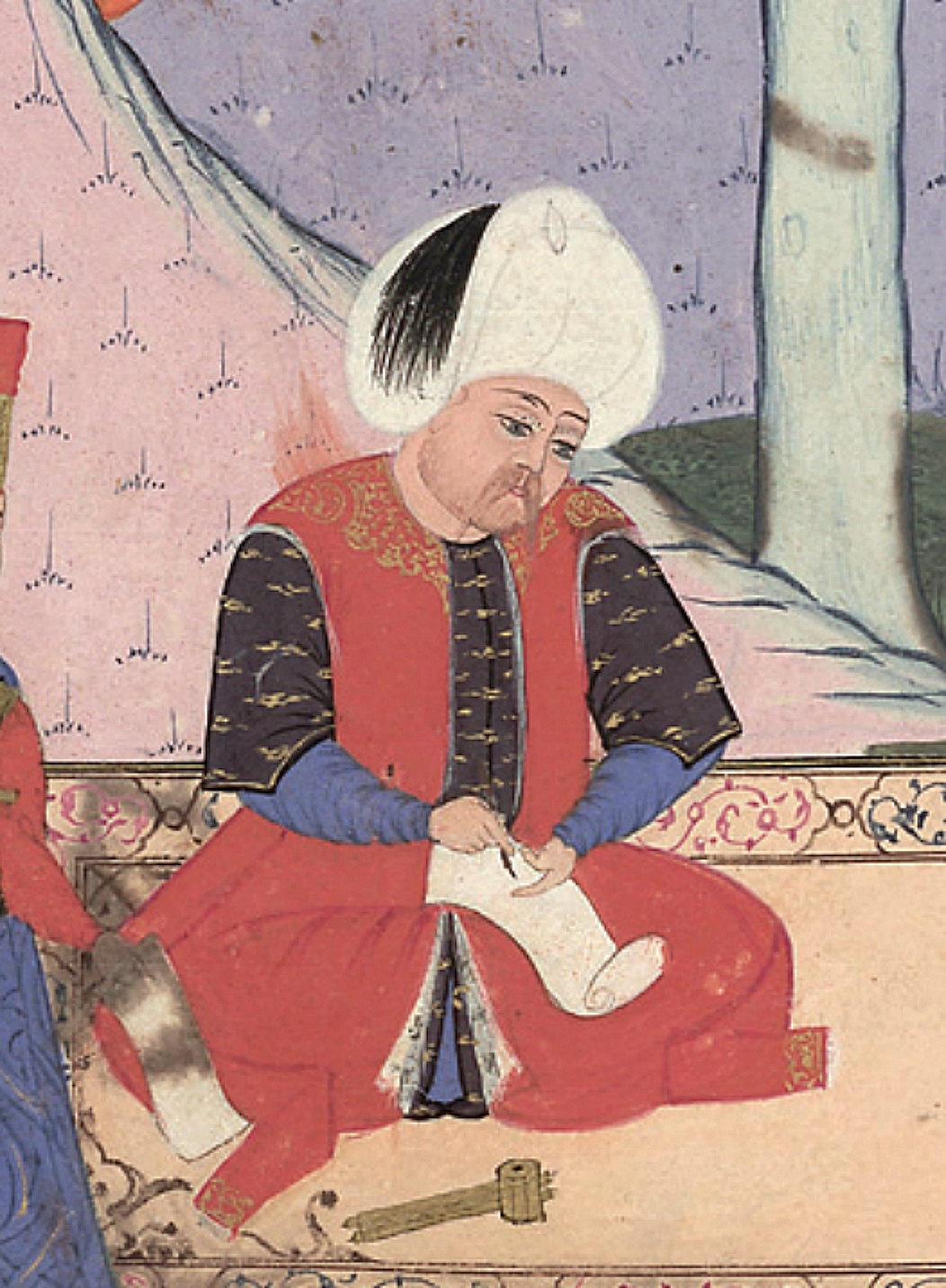
Sultan Selim writing a letter in 1566. Nüzhet (1568–69).

In mid-April 1559, Bayezid and his army departed Amasya and advanced toward Ankara. Despite conveying to his father his desire to return to Kütahya, it became evident that his true intention was to attack and eliminate Selim, aiming to be the sole heir to the throne before Suleiman sided with Selim. Upon learning of Bayezid's expedition, Suleiman deemed military action necessary, instructing the third vizier Sokullu Mehmed to join Selim with janissaries, accompanied by Rumeli troops. Before Constantinople's forces reached Konya, Bayezid altered course southward from Ankara, arriving near Konya by late May 1559. Selim, anticipating the attack, assumed a defensive stance with augmented forces, ultimately prevailing in the engagement on May 30 and 31.

In July 1559, Bayezid embarked on an eastern march from Amasya, accompanied by ten thousand men and four of his sons. By the autumn of the same year, he reached Yerevan, a Safavid town, receiving great respect from its governor. Subsequently, in October, he arrived in Qazvin, where Shah Tahmasp I welcomed him initially with enthusiasm, hosting elaborate parties in his honor. However, in April 1560, on Sultan Suleiman's request, Tahmasp imprisoned Bayezid. Both Suleiman and Selim dispatched envoys to Persia to persuade Shah Tahmasp to execute Bayezid. Over the next one and a half years, embassies shuttled between Istanbul and Qazvin. The last Ottoman embassy, arriving on 16 July 1561, had the formal task of attempting to return Bayezid to Istanbul. This delegation included figures like Hüsrev Pasha, Sinan Pasha, Ali Aqa Chavush Bashi, and two hundred officials.

Suleiman's letter accompanying the embassy expressed his willingness to reconfirm the Treaty of Amasya (1555) and foster a new era of Ottoman–Safavid relations. Throughout these diplomatic efforts, Suleiman bestowed numerous gifts on Tahmasp and agreed to pay him for handing over Bayezid—400,000 gold coins were given to Tahmasp. Finally, on 25 September 1561, Tahmasp handed over Bayezid and his four sons, who were subsequently executed near Qazvin by the Ottoman executioner, Ali Aqa Chavush Bashi, using the garroting method. In early 1562, Selim had been appointed as the governor of Kütahya, and following Bayezid's death, his last years as a prince were spent peacefully in his court in Kütahya.

== Reign ==
=== Accession ===
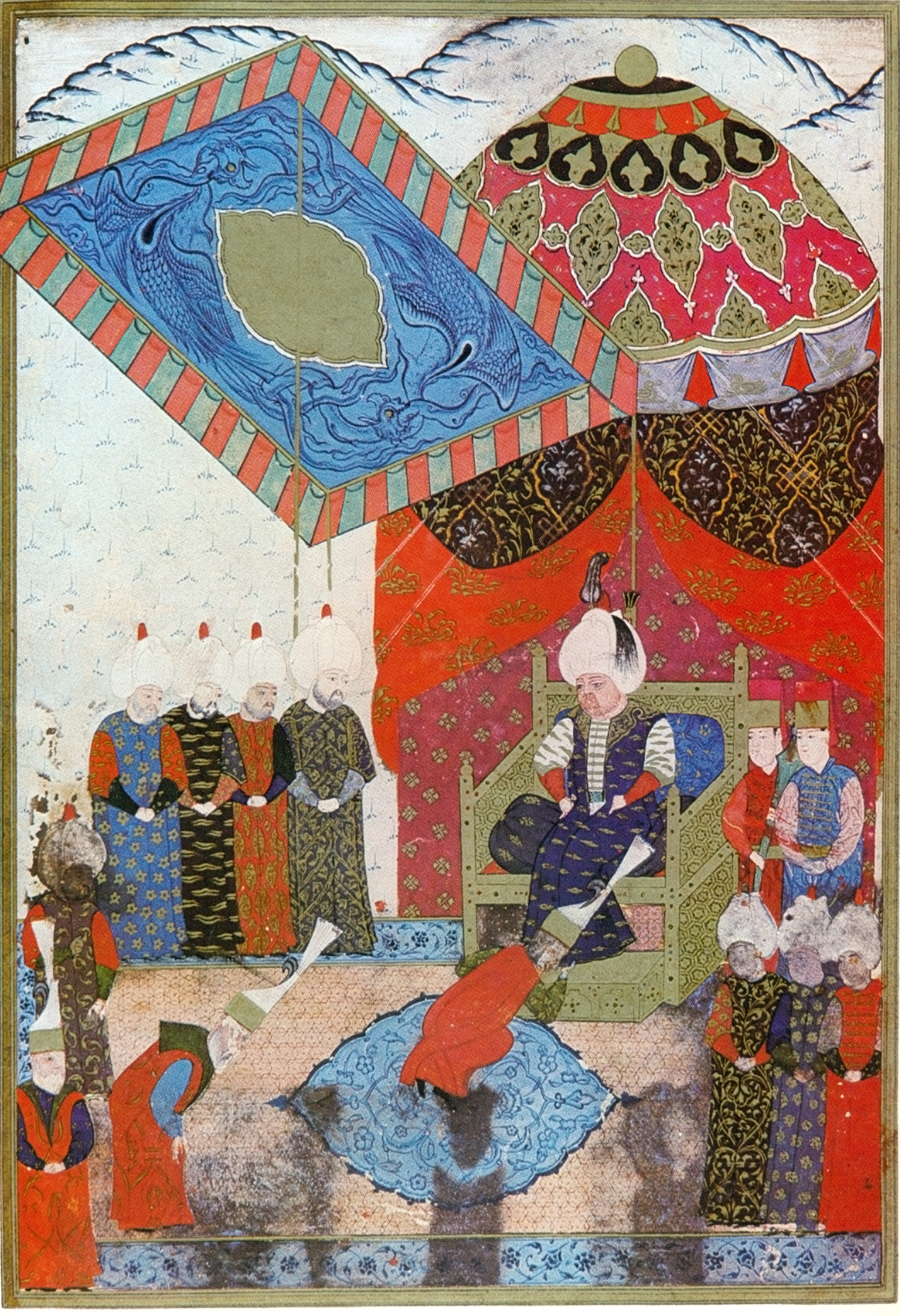
Selim ascends the throne. Nüzhet-i Esrâr (1568–69)

Selim ascended the throne on 29 September 1566, following the death of his father on 6 September. Initially, his enthronement ceremony occurred in Istanbul, despite the presence of viziers and the military in Szigetvár, Hungary. The ceremony went unrecognised, leading to a request for a new ceremony in Belgrade. On 2 October, three days later, the sultan left Istanbul. In order to safeguard the process of enthronement and accession, the astute grand vizier Sokollu Mehmed Pasha maintained the secrecy of Suleiman's death until Selim arrived at the army in Belgrade. In Belgrade, a throne was positioned between two tuğs (horsehair battle standards) in front of the imperial tent. The allegiance ceremony was then conducted at that location. The new sultan went to Belgrade without offering the accession bonus, the standing army sought assurances of gratuity and promotion, but the sultan dismissed their request. Consequently, upon entering Istanbul, the army revolted, citing the absence of a proper enthronement ceremony. The crisis was resolved only when Selim’s sister, Mihrimah Sultan, intervened by using her personal fortune to pay the Janissaries, defusing the mutiny and stabilizing Selim's early reign.

=== Administration ===
Sokollu Mehmed Pasha, Selim II's grand vizier and great statesman

Sokollu Mehmed Pasha served as grand vizier throughout Selim II's entire reign, having been appointed in 1565 under Suleiman I and remaining in office until his assassination in 1579. He exercised considerable influence over the day-to-day administration of the empire and was responsible for the practical conduct of government affairs. Contemporary European observers, particularly Venetian and Habsburg envoys, frequently described him as the central figure in imperial decision-making during these years. Ottoman historians of the late sixteenth century called him the "virtual sultan". When Selim ascended the throne, the war with the Habsburgs was still ongoing, but Sokollu persuaded the sultan to make peace with them. However, although Sokollu opposed the Cyprus campaign, Selim ordered it to be carried out; according to Venetian historian Paolo Paruta, he approved the plans of Piyale Mehmed Pasha and Lala Mustafa Pasha for the conquest of Cyprus.

Unlike his father, Selim II did not lead the army in person during his reign, remaining largely in Istanbul and, for hunting, in Edirne. Venetian reports credited Selim's consort Nurbanu Sultan with considerable influence on state affairs alongside Sokollu, though she is not known to have intervened directly in politics. The sultan was also close to the financier and diplomat Joseph Nasi, who had supported him against his brother Bayezid, and rose to prominence at court. The emergence of the court and favourites system, along with the sedentarization of the sultanate, marked Selim's reign and later became defining aspects of power struggles among his successors.

Over time during his reign, the janissaries began to increase their power at the expense of the sultan. "Accession money" demanded by the janissaries had increased; they used their power to gain more benefits for their personal lives instead of improving the state. Janissaries were now able to marry and were allowed to enroll their sons in the Corps.

=== Treaties of Edirne and Speyer ===
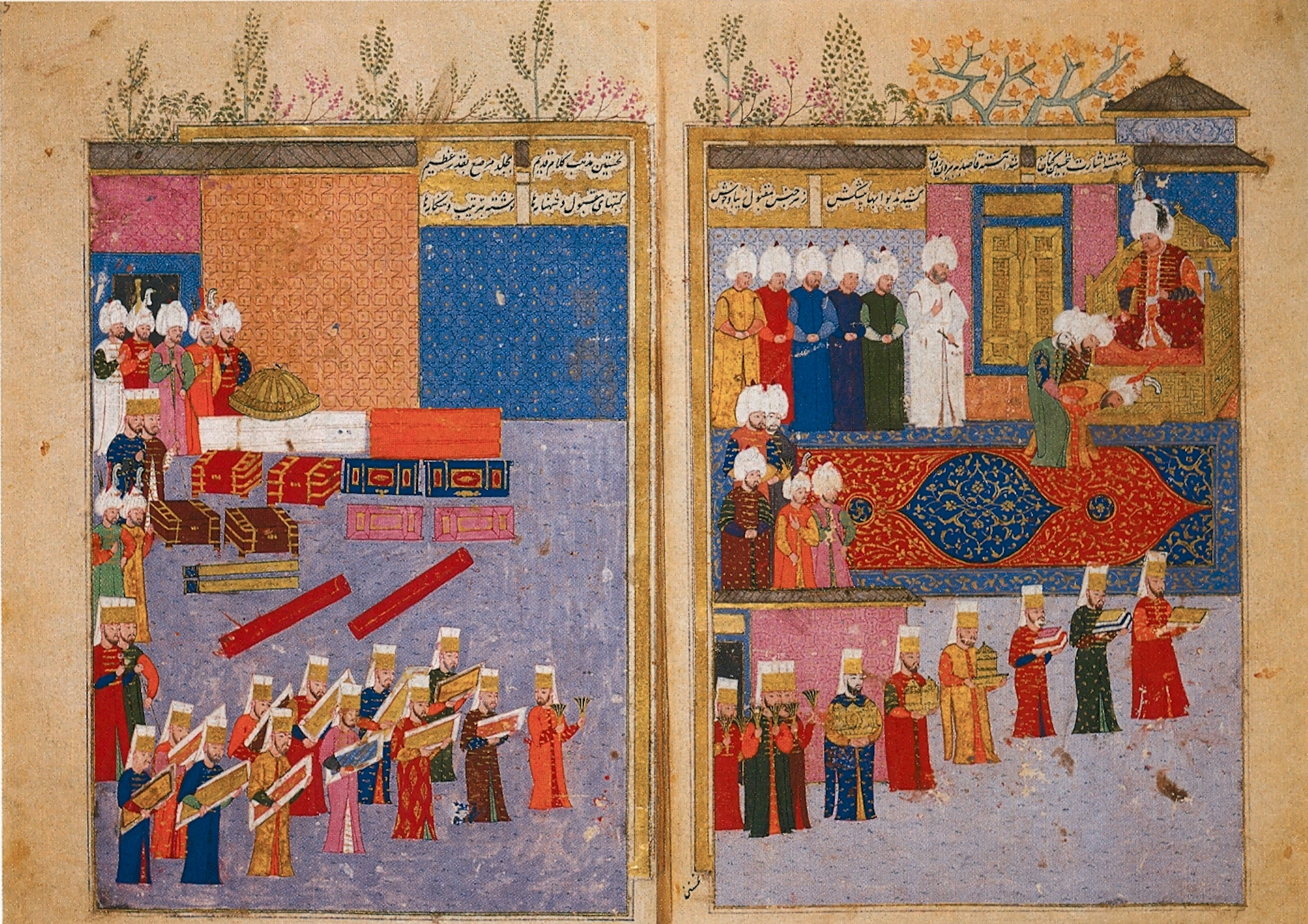
"Presentation of Gifts by the Safavid Ambassador, Shahquili, to Sultan Selim II at Edirne in 1568", Şehname-I Selim Han, 1581.

In 1568, the treaty of Edirne was concluded, after which the Habsburg Holy Roman Emperor, Maximilian II recognised recent Ottoman conquests in Hungary and continued paying an annual tribute to the sultan. The longstanding Transylvanian issue, a source of conflicts between the Habsburgs and Ottomans, found resolution in the treaty of Speyer during the imperial diet in 1570. In this treaty, John Sigismund Zápolya relinquished his title as the elected king of Hungary, adopting the titles of prince of Transylvania and the adjacent parts of Hungary. Maximilian acknowledged these changes, and John Sigismund accepted Maximilian's suzerainty over his principality, which remained a part of the Holy Crown of Hungary. Despite this, the Transylvanian prince continued to be an Ottoman vassal. In essence, the Principality of Transylvania existed in a dual dependency, with its sovereignty constrained by both the sultan and the Habsburg kings of Hungary.

=== Yemen Rebellion (1567–1570) ===
In 1567, following the death of Suleiman I, the Zaydi imam al-Mutahhar ibn Yahya Sharaf al-Din launched a major rebellion against Ottoman rule in Yemen. Taking advantage of administrative disorder and heavy taxation, Mutahhar's forces captured key highland centers including Sana'a and Ta'izz, reducing Ottoman control largely to the coastal enclave around Zabid by mid-1568. Selim II responded by appointing Lala Mustafa Pasha, the beylerbey of Damascus and his former tutor, as serdar of a relief expedition in late 1567. However, delays in Egypt and rivalry with Koca Sinan Pasha led to Mustafa's dismissal; Sinan Pasha, then beylerbey of Egypt, was placed in command of the campaign of 1568–69. Özdemiroğlu Osman Pasha was simultaneously appointed beylerbey of the reunited Yemen province and played a prominent role in the fighting, including the recovery of Ta'izz. Ottoman forces eventually recaptured Aden, Ta'izz and much of the highlands, though they were unable to eliminate Mutahhar entirely. A peace was concluded in May 1570 at Kawkaban, under which Mutahhar recognized suzeranity (the Friday sermon and coinage in the sultan's name) while retaining substantial local authority. The campaign restored a measure of Ottoman control but at considerable cost and without fully suppressing Zaydi resistance in the highlands.

=== Aceh expedition ===
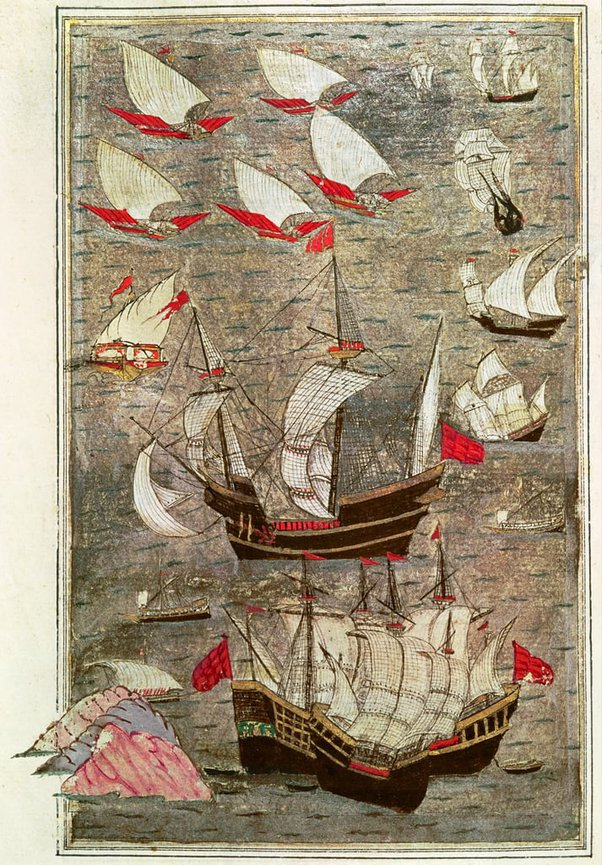
Ottoman fleet in the Indian Ocean

In response to repeated requests from Sultan Alauddin Riayat Shah al-Qahhar of Aceh for military assistance against Portuguese pressure in the Indian Ocean, Selim II ordered the preparation of a substantial naval expedition in 1567. Command was given to Kurdoğlu Hızır Reis, formerly captain of Alexandria, who was to lead a fleet of fifteen galleys and two large transport vessels from Suez, carrying cannons, gunsmiths, artillerymen, soldiers and other specialists. Imperial orders issued in September 1567 explicitly instructed the force to support Aceh and attack Portuguese fortifications.

While the fleet was being readied, the outbreak of the Zaydi rebellion in Yemen forced a change of plans. The ships and most of the personnel were diverted to the Yemen campaign; only a much smaller contingent—two ships carrying cannons, a flag, and a number of gunsmiths and technicians—reached Aceh in 1568 or 1569. These specialists assisted the Acehnese in casting cannon and improving their military capabilities, contributing to Aceh's ability to resist Portuguese pressure for decades thereafter. The planned large-scale Ottoman naval intervention never materialized, largely because of the Yemen crisis and subsequent commitments in the Mediterranean.

=== Astrakhan expedition ===
In 1569, Selim made an unsuccessful attempt to conquer Astrakhan. One of the most ambitious endeavours during his reign, albeit left unfinished, was the construction of a canal connecting the Don and Volga rivers. Championed by Grand Vizier Sokollu Mehmed Pasha, this extensive project involved excavating around 40 miles of challenging terrain. The canal, if completed, aimed to strategically benefit the Ottomans along the northern frontiers, serving to control Muscovy's advancement and establishing a base for potential attacks on Safavid Persia. Unfortunately, adverse weather conditions and disorder among the soldiers dispatched to the region hindered the canal's completion.

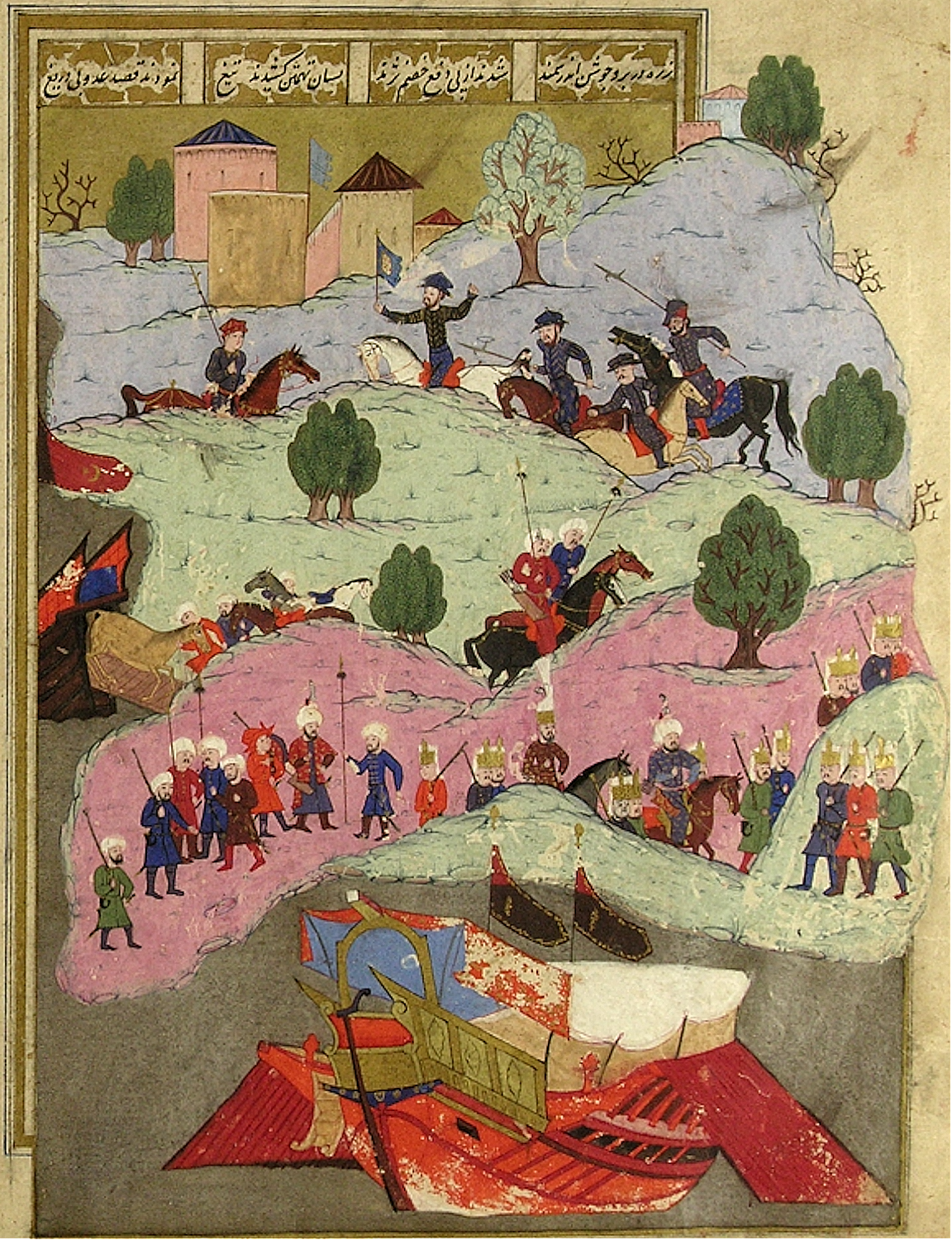
Ottomans conquering the Limassol Castle

=== Campaigns in the Mediterranean ===
During his reign, naval campaigns unfolded in the Mediterranean. In 1571, the Ottomans seized Cyprus from the Venetians, transforming it into a new province alongside neighboring regions in mainland Anatolia. Initially, the island's harsh climate deterred migration, but under state pressure, a considerable number of Turkish settlers eventually established themselves. In the same year, the Holy League, comprising Papal, Venetian, and Spanish fleets, retaliated for the capture of Cyprus in the decisive Battle of Lepanto, a significant Christian stronghold. The Ottoman navy suffered a heavy defeat, but was largely rebuilt within a year under the direction of Sokollu Mehmed Pasha. Despite this setback, the recovery of the fortress of Tunis from Spain in 1574, shortly before Selim's death, marked a notable naval success.

==== Conquest of Cyprus ====
The conquest of Cyprus, a Venetian possession since 1489, was the principal military undertaking of Selim II's reign. After the war in Hungary ended in 1568, the Ottomans turned their attention to the island, whose position between Anatolia and the recently acquired provinces of the Levant and Egypt made it a tempting target, and whose Venetian authorities were accused of sheltering corsairs who harassed Ottoman shipping, including pilgrims bound for Mecca. Despite the opposition of a peace party around Grand Vizier Sokollu Mehmed Pasha, Selim ordered the conquest of the island. The Ottoman army landed near Larnaca in July 1570 and besieged Nicosia, which fell on 9 September after a siege of about seven weeks.

The fortress of Kyrenia surrendered without resistance, but Famagusta, under Marco Antonio Bragadin, resisted for nearly a year, giving Pope Pius V time to assemble the Holy League, which was concluded in May 1571. The garrison capitulated on 1 August 1571 after exhausting its ammunition and supplies, and Lala Mustafa Pasha, angered by the killing of Muslim prisoners during the siege, had Bragadin executed. Two months later the Ottoman fleet was defeated at Lepanto; Sokollu reportedly told the Venetian bailo that the Ottomans had merely lost a beard that would regrow, whereas Venice had lost an arm. Venice, concluded a separate peace on 7 March 1573, by which Cyprus was formally ceded to the Ottomans and Venice agreed to pay an indemnity of 300,000 ducats.

=== Polish-Lithuanian Succession ===
Following the death of childless Sigismund II Augustus in 1572 and the introduction of free election in the Polish-Lithuanian Commonwealth, the Ottomans sought to prevent the election of a Habsburg candidate who might draw Poland into conflict with the empire. Through Grand Vizier Sokollu Mehmed Pasha, the Porte initially preferred a native ("Piast") candidate, but later supported Henry of Valois (the future Henry III of France), brother of Charles IX, as a counterweight to the Habsburg and in line with the long-standing Franco-Ottoman alliance. In letters to the Polish nobility in 1573, Selim II warned that the election of a king hostile to the Ottoman could lead to attacks on Polish border territories and indicated that, if a foreign prince were to be chosen, the French candidate was acceptable. Ottoman envoys and correspondence emphasised that Henry's election would preserve peaceful relations. Henry was elected in May 1573 and reached Poland the following year; his short reign (he fled in June 1574 upon inheriting the French throne) was nevertheless consistent with Ottoman interests in blocking a Habsburg on the Polish throne. Similar Ottoman pressure was later applied against Habsburg candidates in the 1576–1576 election that brought Stephen Báthory to the throne.

=== Architecture ===
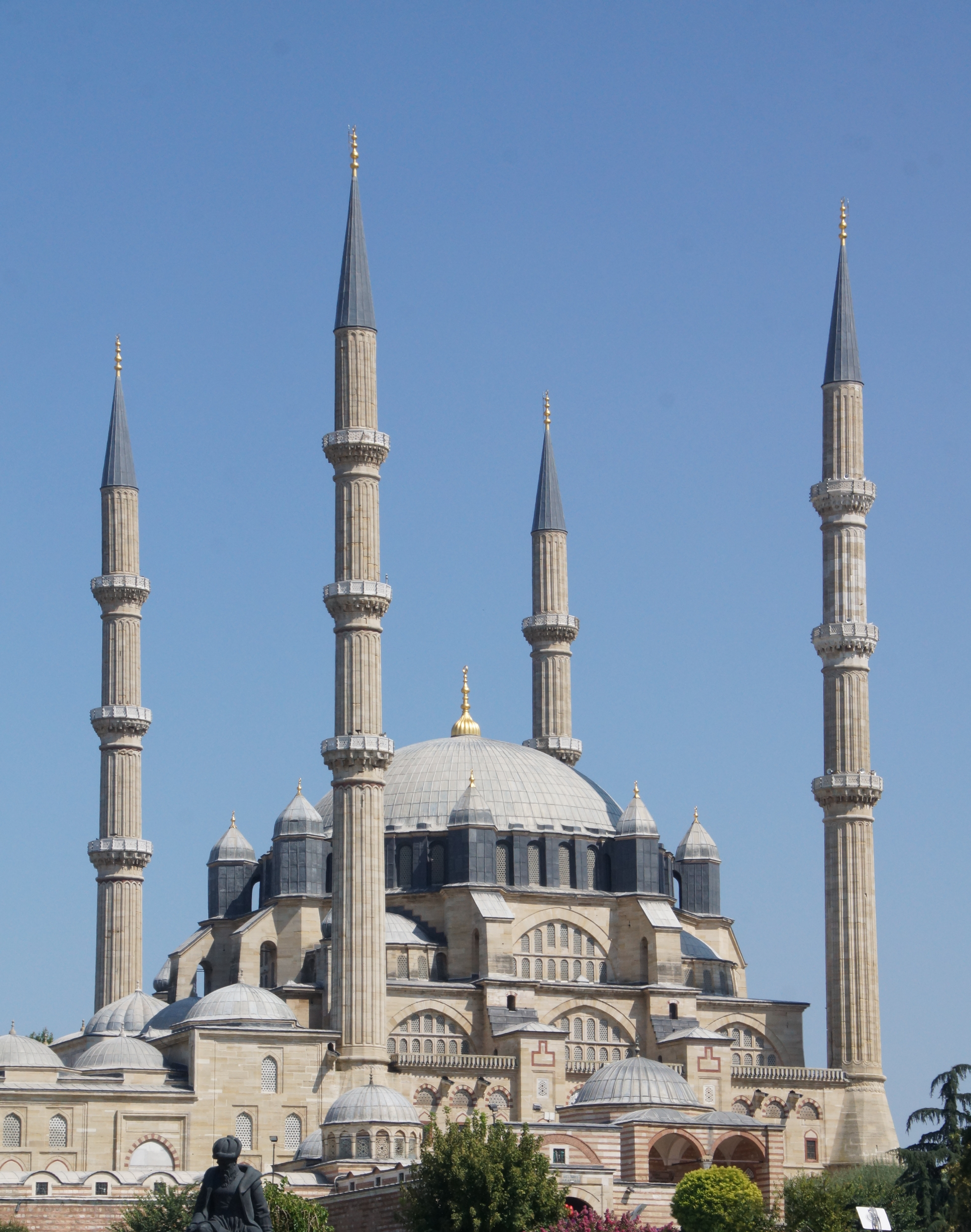
Selimiye Mosque, located in Edirne, Turkey

Suleiman had left a lasting legacy in Damascus by commissioning the construction of the impressive Sulaymaniyya Takiyya mosque along the Barada River, situated outside the city walls. Designed in 1554 by the renowned architect Mimar Sinan, it was commonly referred to as the Takiyya, acknowledging the Sufi hostel (tekke or zawiyya) within its courtyard chambers. Selim expanded upon his father's mosque by adding the Salimiyya Madrasa in 1566–67. Subsequently, this complex became the starting point for the annual pilgrimage to Mecca. Selim favoured Edirne over Istanbul, demonstrating his affection for the former Ottoman capital, especially relishing visits and hunting sessions in the city. And so he undertook the construction of a significant mosque here. The mosque which is known as Selimiye Mosque, is the largest of all Ottoman mosques, was erected between 1569 and 1575 under the supervision of Sultan Selim's chief architect, Sinan. He also undertook a significant renovation of the Hagia Sophia Mosque from 1572 to 1574 under the guidance of Sinan. This restoration included repairing the buttresses, substituting the wooden minaret with a brick one, and introducing two new minarets. Furthermore, adjacent structures were demolished to create the characteristic courtyard of the imperial mosque.

== Death ==
Selim died after slipping and falling on a marble floor while drunk at the age of fifty on 15 December 1574. Selim’s wife, Nurbanu, kept his death hidden for several days, famously preserving his body in a harem icebox, to ensure that her own son Murad could arrive to claim the throne without opposition. Selim II is buried in his tomb in Hagia Sophia Mosque, Istanbul.

== Character ==
Selim was known for being a generous supporter of poets and had a strong interest in literature, and wrote poems under the pen name Selimi. During his time as the governor of Kütahya, he actively engaged with poetry, surrounding himself with poets, including notable figures like Turak Çelebi. Among his associates, Nigari not only served as a confidante but also played roles as an entertainer and portraitist for the sultan.

He is reputed in the sources of the period to have been a generous monarch, fond of pleasure and entertainment and of drink councils, and who enjoyed the presence of scholars, poets and musicians around him. Selim’s generosity is evidenced by his treatment of Mahidevran, the former consort of Suleiman I and mother of his late half-brother Şehzade Mustafa. Following the execution of Mustafa, Mahidevran had been left in severe poverty by Suleiman. Immediately upon ascending the throne, Selim restored her financial status, cleared her debts and allocated her a royal stipend. He also funded the completion of Mustafa’s imperial tomb.

However, it is stated that he did not appear much in public, and that his father often went to Friday prayer and out among the public; Selim neglected this and spent his time in the palace.

== Family ==
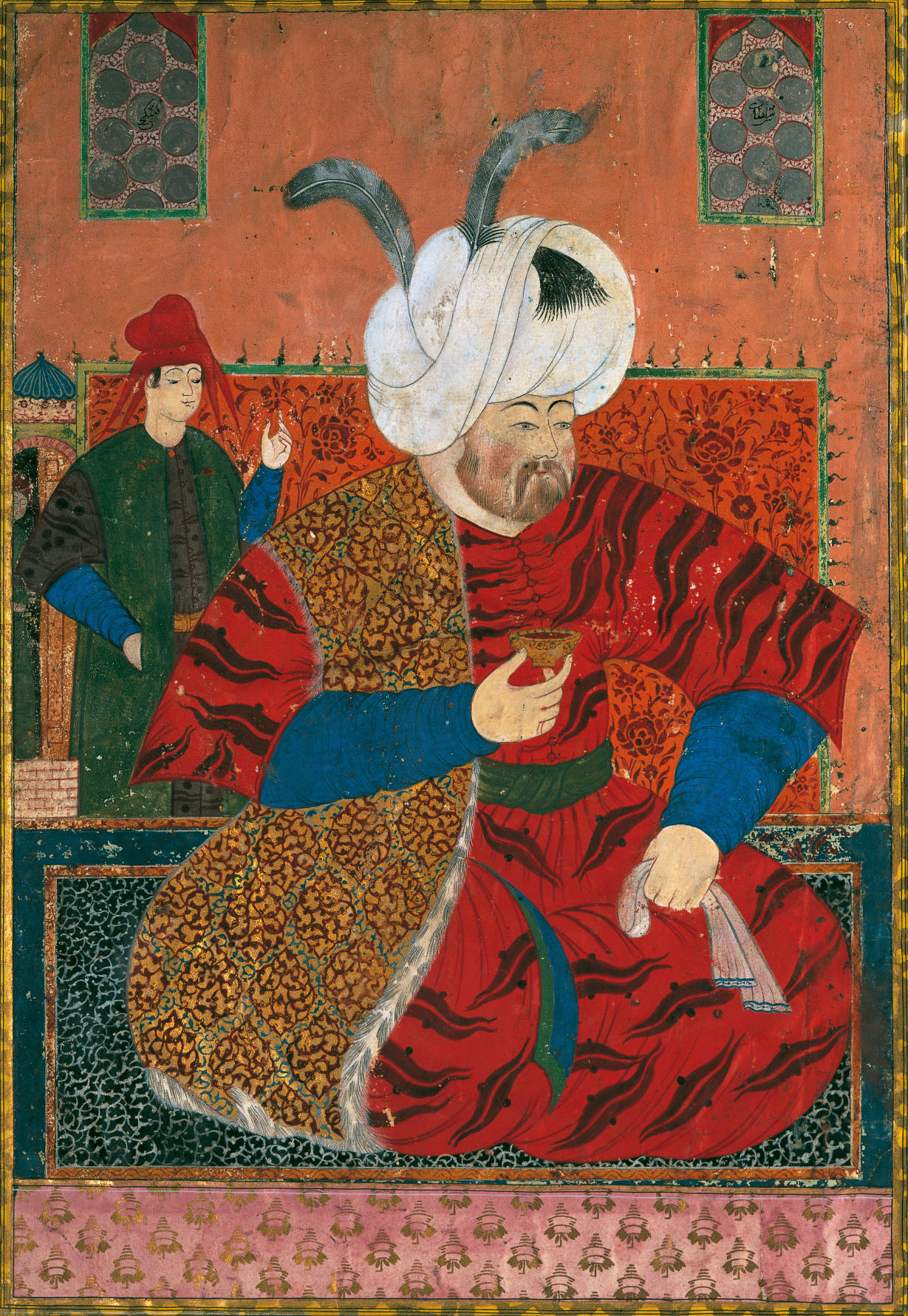
Portrait by Nigari c. 1570

=== Consorts ===
Selim had a Haseki Sultan and legal wife, and at least seven other concubines. Making at least 8 main known concubines.

- Nurbanu Sultan, his favorite concubine, Haseki Sultan, legal wife and the mother and Valide Sultan of his successor Sultan Murad III. During Selim's reign, her stipend was 1,100 aspers a day. Selim legally married her in 1571, and bestowed upon her 110,000 ducats as a dowry, surpassing the 100,000 ducats that his father bestowed upon his mother Hürrem Sultan. She died on 7 December 1583.
- Fülane Hatun (died December 1574), mother of Şehzade Süleyman. When her son was executed upon Murad's ascension in 1574, allegedly committed suicide shortly after.
- Fülane Hatun. Mother of Şehzade Ali, died in 1572 during childbirth.
- Fülane Hatun (died on 19 April 1577). Mother of Şehzade Osman
- Other four concubines, each mother of one of the other princes. They, and other three upon, each received 40 aspers a day.

=== Sons ===
Selim had at least eight sons:

- Murad III (Manisa, 4 July 1546 – Constantinople, 15 January 1595, buried in his mausoleum in the Hagia Sophia Mosque) – with Nurbanu Sultan. The 12th sultan of the Ottoman Empire.
- Şehzade Mehmed (1571 – September 1572, buried in the Hürrem Sultan mausoleum).
- Şehzade Süleyman (1571 – 22 December 1574, executed by Murad III, buried with his father in Hagia Sophia), his mother committed suicide shortly after his death.
- Şehzade Abdullah (1571 – 22 December 1574, executed by Murad III, buried with his father in Hagia Sophia).
- Şehzade Ali (1572 – 1572, buried with his father in Hagia Sophia), died shortly after birth along with his mother.
- Şehzade Osman (1573 – 22 December 1574, executed by Murad III, buried with his father in Hagia Sophia).
- Şehzade Mustafa (Constantinople, 1573 – Constantinople, 22 December 1574, executed by Murad III, buried with his father in Hagia Sophia).
- Şehzade Cihangir (1574 – 22 December 1574, executed by Murad III, buried with his father in Hagia Sophia).

=== Daughters ===
Selim had at least four daughters:

- Şah Sultan (Karaman, c.1543 – Constantinople, 3 November 1580, buried in her own mausoleum, Eyüp) – with Nurbanu Sultan. Married firstly in 1562 to Çakırcıbaşı Hasan Pasha, married secondly in 1574 to Zal Mahmud Pasha;
- Gevherhan Sultan (Manisa, 1544 – Constantinople, 1624, buried with her father in Hagia Sophia) – with Nurbanu Sultan. Married firstly in 1562 to Piali Pasha, married secondly in 1579 to Cerrah Mehmed Pasha;
- Ismihan Sultan (Manisa, 1545 – Constantinople, 8 August 1585, buried with her father in Hagia Sophia) – with Nurbanu Sultan. Married firstly in 1562 to Sokollu Mehmed Pasha, married secondly in 1584 to Kalaylıkoz Ali Pasha;
- Fatma Sultan (Konya, c. 1559 – Constantinople, October 1580, buried with her father in Hagia Sophia). Married in 1573 to Kanijeli Siyavuş Pasha;

== In popular culture ==
- He is played by Atılay Uluışık in the 2003 Turkish TV series Hürrem Sultan.
- He is portrayed by Engin Öztürk in the 2011–2014 series Muhteşem Yüzyıl (lit. 'Magnificent Century').

== Bibliography ==
- A’goston, Ga’bor; Masters, Bruce Alan (May 21, 2010). Encyclopedia of the Ottoman Empire. Infobase Publishing. ISBN 978-1-4381-1025-7.
- Çiçekler, Mustafa (2011-12-19). "Şehzâde Bayezid Ve Farsça Divançesi". Şarkiyat Mecmuası (in Turkish) (8). İstanbul Üniversitesi. ISSN 1307-5020.
- Finkel, C. (2007). Osman's Dream: The History of the Ottoman Empire. Basic Books. ISBN 978-0-465-00850-6.
- Fotić, Aleksandar (1994). "The Official Explanations for the Confiscation and Sale of Monasteries (Churches) and their Estates at the Time of Selim II". Turcica: Revue d'études turques. 26: 34–54.
- Fotić, Aleksandar (1994). "Lʹ Eglise chrétienne dans lʹEmpire ottoman: Le monastére Chilandar à lʹépoque de Sélim II". Dialogue: Revue trimestrielle d'arts et de sciences. 12 (3): 53–64.
- Gülten, Sadullah (2017-09-24). "Kanuni'nin Maktûl Bir Şehzadesi: Bayezid". Ordu Üniversitesi Sosyal Bilimler Araştırmaları Dergisi. 3 (6): 96–104.
- Mitchell, Collin P. (2009). The Practice of Politics in Safavid Iran: Power, Religion and Rhetoric. I.B.Tauris. ISBN 978-0-85771-588-3.
- Peirce, Leslie P. (1993). The imperial harem : women and sovereignty in the Ottoman Empire. New York: Oxford University Press. ISBN 0-19-507673-7. OCLC 27811454.
- Şahin, K. (2023). Peerless Among Princes: The Life and Times of Sultan Süleyman. Oxford University Press. ISBN 978-0-19-753163-1.
- Sakaoğlu, Necdet (2008). Bu mülkün kadın sultanları: Vâlide sultanlar, hâtunlar, hasekiler, kadınefendiler, sultanefendiler. Oğlak Yayıncılık. ISBN 978-9-753-29623-6.
- Turan, Şerafettin (1961). Kanunînin Oğlu Şehzade Bayezid Vak'ası. Ankara: Turk Tarih Kirumu Basimevi.
- Tarim, Zeynep (2019). "Sigetvarname: A Visual Source of Sultan Süleyman's Last Campaign". The Battle for Central Europe: The Siege of Szigetvár and the Death of Süleyman the Magnificent and Nicholas Zrínyi (1566). Leiden; Boston : Budapest: BRILL; HAS, Research Centre for the Humanities. ISBN 9789004396234.
- Yermolenko, Galina (April 2005). Roxolana: "The Greatest Empresse of the East. DeSales University, Center Valley, Pennsylvania.

Selim II House of Osman Born: May 30, 1524 Died: December 15, 1574[aged 50]
Regnal titles
Preceded by Suleiman I	Sultan of the Ottoman Empire; Sep 7, 1566 – Dec 15, 1574	Succeeded by Murad III
Sunni Islam titles
Preceded by Suleiman I	Caliph of the Ottoman Dynasty; Sep 7, 1566 – Dec 15, 1574	Succeeded by Murad III
