= Kanijeli Siyavuş Pasha =

Grand Vizier of the Ottoman Empire (1582–1584, 1586–1589, 1592–1593)

Grand Vizier of the Ottoman Empire
- In office 4 April 1592 – 28 January 1593
- Monarch: Murad III
- Preceded by: Serdar Ferhad Pasha
- Succeeded by: Koca Sinan Pasha
- In office 15 April 1586 – 2 April 1589
- Monarch: Murad III
- Preceded by: Hadim Mesih Pasha
- Succeeded by: Koca Sinan Pasha
- In office 24 December 1582 – 28 July 1584
- Monarch: Murad III
- Preceded by: Koca Sinan Pasha
- Succeeded by: Özdemiroğlu Osman Pasha

Personal details
- Born: Kanizsa, Ottoman Empire (modern-day Hungary)
- Died: 1602 Istanbul, Ottoman Empire (modern Turkey)
- Spouse: Fatma Sultan (m. 1574; died 1580)
- Children: Sultanzade Ahmed Bey; Sultanzade Mustafa Pasha; Sultanzade Abdülkadir Bey; Sultanzade Süleyman Bey; Fülane Hanımsultan

Kanijeli Siyavuş Pasha (Ottoman Turkish: کانیجلی سیاوش پاشا, Serbo-Croatian: Sijavuš-paša Kanjižanin, died 1602) was an Ottoman statesman from the Sanjak of Bosnia, who served as a Grand Vizier of the Ottoman Empire. He was also the Beylerbey of Rumelia. His origins are believed to have been Hungarian or Croatian.

== Marriage and issue ==
In 1574, he married Fatma Sultan, the daughter of Sultan Selim II.

They had four sons and a daughter; only one son lived to adulthood.

- Sultanzade Ahmed Bey (1573–1582/1583)
- Sultanzade Mustafa Paşah (1575 – April 1599). He had issue.
- Sultanzade Abdülkaadir Bey (1577–1583)
- Sultanzade Süleyman Bey (1579–1583)
- Fülane Hanımsultan (October 1580 – October 1580). Born prematurely and died three days later. Her mother died in childbirth.

== See also ==
- List of Ottoman grand viziers

== Sources ==
- And, Metin (1994). Istanbul in the 16th Century: The City, the Palace, Daily Life. Akbank.
- Uluçay, Mustafa Çağatay (1992). Padışahların kadınları ve kızları [The wives and daughters of the sultans] (in Turkish). Türk Tarihi Kurumu Yayınları.
