= Fatma Sultan (daughter of Selim II) =

Ottoman princess, daughter of Selim II

- Born: c. 1559; Konya Eyalet, Ottoman Empire
- Died: October 1580 (aged 20–21); Constantinople, Ottoman Empire
- Burial: Selim II Mausoleum, Hagia Sophia Mosque
- Spouse: Kanijeli Siyavuş Pasha (m. 1574)
- Issue: Sultanzade Ahmed Bey; Sultanzade Mustafa Pasha; Sultanzade Abdülkadir Bey; Sultanzade Süleyman Bey; Fülane Hanımsultan
- Dynasty: Ottoman
- Father: Selim II
- Religion: Sunni Islam

Fatma Sultan (Ottoman Turkish: فاطمه سلطان; c. 1559 – October 1580) was an Ottoman princess, daughter of Sultan Selim II (reign 1566–1574) of the Ottoman Empire. She was the granddaughter of Suleiman the Magnificent (reign 1520–66) and Hürrem Sultan, half-sister of Sultan Murad III (reign 1574–1595) and the aunt of Sultan Mehmed III (reign 1595–1603).

== Early life ==
Fatma was born circa 1559 during Selim's princedom, at Konya where he served as sanjakbey, or provincial governor, at the time. She was her father's youngest daughter. Her mother's identity is uncertain.

It was earlier disputed whether she was the daughter of Nurbanu Sultan but considering that Nurbanu accompanied her son, Murad to his province to which he was appointed by his grandfather, Suleiman the Magnificent in 1558 and Fatma was born in 1559, Peirce had debunked this possibility. That Fatma was born with an unknown concubine is further proved by the provision made by her for her mother for 40 aspers, which was definitely not required by a woman paid 1,100 aspers by the end of Selim II's reign as haseki sultan and 2,000 aspers in her son, Murad III's reign as valide sultan and who had died in 1583, predating Fatma's will.

== Marriage ==
In 1574, she married Kanijeli Siyavuş Pasha (died 1602), then Beylerbey (governor-general) of Rumelia, and eventually Grand Vizier (1582–1584, 1586–1589, 1592–1593). Stephan Gerlach, first assistant and clergyman to the ambassador of the Holy Roman Empire at Istanbul from 1573 to 1578, recorded word that the Beylerbey was originally a slave whom Fatma's father Selim bought as a boy for 500 ducats and came to regard as his own son. It was in Sultan Selim's will that this marriage be arranged.

Fatma's dowry amounted to approximately 5000 ducats. The marriage was happy, as indicated by the fact that she pleaded with her brother Murad to spare Siyavuş Pasha's life when at some point the latter fell out of favour. Siyavuş Pasha's physician, Moses Benveniste was often at dinner with the couple. She bore her husband four sons and a daughter, but only a son survived beyond the infancy.

== Charities ==
Fatma had an elementary school, or mektep, as well as a religious college, or medrese, constructed at Edirnekapı.

== Death ==
Fatma Sultan died in October 1580, at Istanbul, in childbirth as a result of her daughter being born prematurely. The latter reportedly died too. She was entombed in her father Sultan Selim II's mausoleum in Hagia Sophia Mosque. She had a provision made, supported by vakfs, that is, charitable foundations, so that the Quran would be read every morning, for the sake of her soul.

== Issue ==
By her marriage, Fatma had four sons and a daughter. Only a son survived after infancy.

- Sultanzade Ahmed Bey (1573 – 1582)
- Sultanzade Mustafa Pasha (1575 – April 1599). He had issue.
- Sultanzade Abdulkadir Bey (1577 – 1583)
- Sultanzade Süleyman Bey (1579 – 1583)
- Fülane Hanımsultan (October 1580 – October 1580). She was born prematurely and died three days later. Fatma died in childbirth.

== Sources ==
- Peirce, Leslie Penn (1993). The Imperial Harem: Women and Sovereignty in the Ottoman Empire. Studies in Middle Eastern History. New York: Oxford University Press. ISBN 978-0-19-507673-8.
- Tezcan, Baki (November 2010). The Second Ottoman Empire: Political and Social Transformation in the Early Modern World. Cambridge University Press. ISBN 978-0-521-51949-6.
- Uluçay, Mustafa Çağatay (1992). Padışahların kadınları ve kızları. Türk Tarihi Kurumu Yayınları.
- And, Metin (1994). Istanbul in the 16th Century: The City, the Palace, Daily Life. Akbank.
- Goodwin, Godfrey (27 January 2006). Private World of the Ottoman Women. London: Saqi Books. ISBN 978-0-86356-745-2.
- Sakaoğlu, Necdet (2008). Bu mülkün kadın sultanları: Vâlide sultanlar, hâtunlar, hasekiler, kadınefendiler, sultanefendiler. Oğlak Yayıncılık. p. 303. ISBN 978-975-329-623-6.
