= Piali Pasha =

Ottoman admiral (1515-1578)

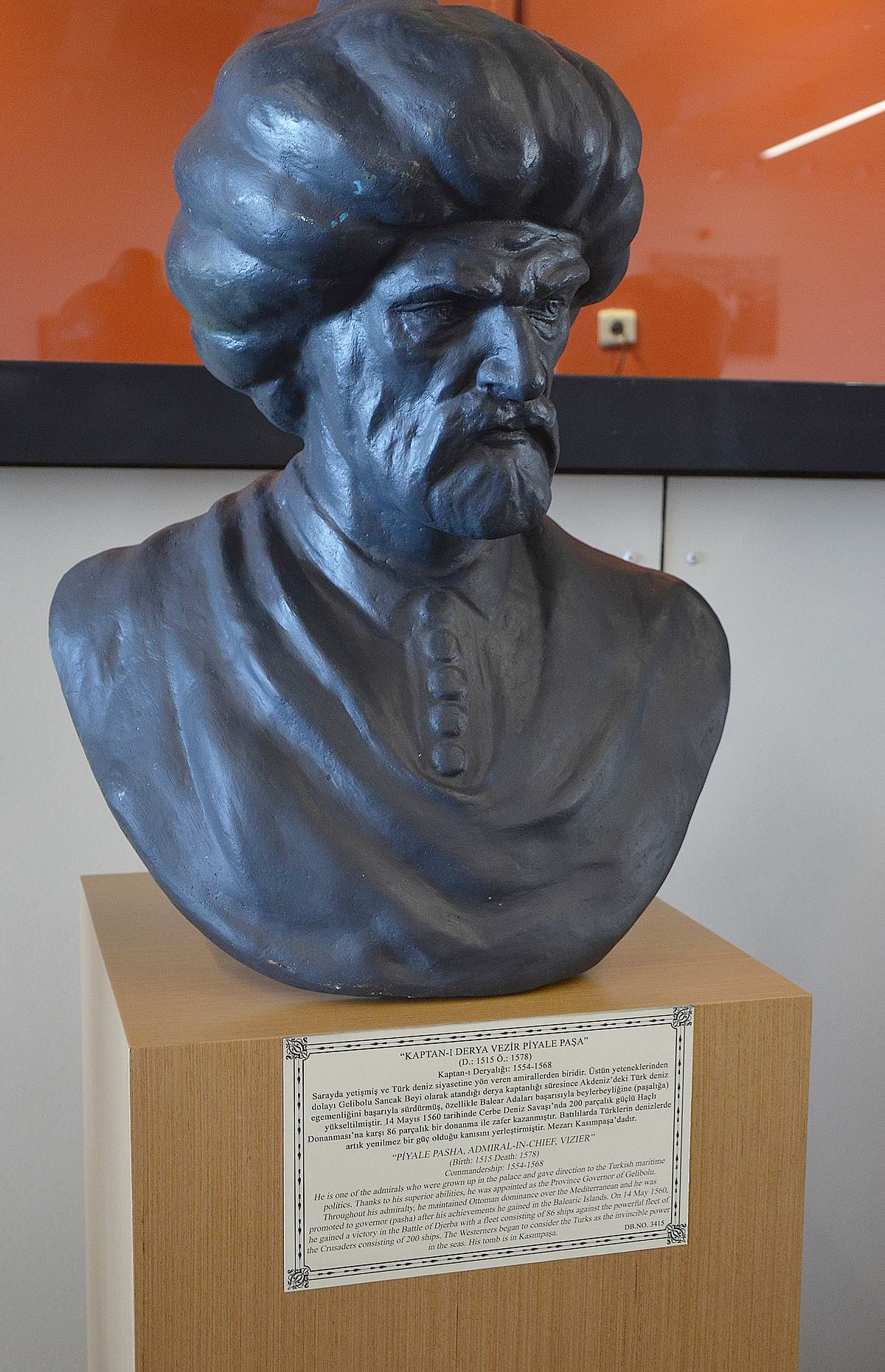
- Bust of Piyale Pasha
- Born: c. 1515; Possibly Hungary
- Died: 21 January 1578 (aged 62–63); Istanbul, Ottoman Empire (modern Turkey)
- Spouse: Gevherhan Sultan (m. 1562)
- Children: Ayşe Atike Hanımsultan; Sultanzade Mehmed Pasha; Sultanzade Mustafa Bey; Fatma Hanımsultan; Hatice Hanımsultan
- Military career
- Branch: Ottoman Navy
- Service years: c. 1553–1567
- Rank: Admiral

Piali Pasha (Turkish: Piyale Paşa; Hungarian: Piali pasa; c. 1515 – 21 January 1578), also known as Piale Pasha or Piyale Pasha, was an Ottoman Grand Admiral (Kapudan Pasha) between 1553 and 1567, and a Vizier (minister) after 1568.

== Early life ==
His exact place of birth is unknown, though he was probably born in Hungary. He was of Hungarian or Croatian (Note: According to Conflict and Conquest in the Islamic World: A Historical Encyclopedia, Piyale Pasha was of Croat origin, but born in Hungary. According to an entry in the TDV Islam Encyclopedia, he was the son of a Croatian shoemaker from Torna, Hungary. According to the majority of Western scholars, he was of Hungarian roots, the son of a Hungarian shoemaker from Torna.) origin. It is said that Piali was the son of a shoemaker from Tolna, a Hungarian shoemaker according to Hidden, who speaks of the son of a "Hungarian shoemaker" as early as 1912, or of a Croatian, according to a 2007 entry in the TDV Islam Encyclopedia. He would become a soldier and be captured by the Ottomans in the Hungarian battlefields (in the 1526 Battle of Mohács).

Piyale Pasha received his formal education at the Enderun School (Imperial Academy) in Constantinople (modern-day Istanbul), Ottoman Empire. He graduated from the Enderun with the title of Kapıcıbaşı and was appointed Sanjak Bey (Provincial Governor) of Gallipoli.

== Admiral of the Ottoman Fleet ==
He was promoted to Bahriye Beylerbeyi (i.e. First Lord of Admiralty) and became Admiral-in-Chief of the Ottoman Fleet at the age of 39.

In 1554 he captured the islands of Elba and Corsica with a large fleet which included famous Ottoman admirals like Turgut Reis and Salih Reis. The following year Sultan Suleiman the Magnificent assigned him the task of helping France against the Spaniards upon request by Catherine de' Medici, mother of King Francis II, and Piyale Pasha set sail on 26 June 1555. The Ottoman fleet met the French fleet at Piombino and successfully repulsed a Spanish attack on France while conquering several Spanish fortresses on the Mediterranean Sea.

== Battle of Djerba ==
In June 1558, joined by Turgut Reis, Piyale Pasha sailed to the Strait of Messina and the two admirals captured Reggio Calabria. From there, they went to the Aeolian Islands and captured several of them, before landing at Amalfi, the Gulf of Salerno, and capturing Massa Lubrense, Cantone and Sorrento. They later landed at Torre del Greco, the coasts of Tuscany, and Piombino. In September 1558 they assaulted the coasts of Spain before capturing Menorca and inflicting particular damage on the island's ports.

This caused fear throughout the Mediterranean coasts of Spain, and King Philip II appealed to Pope Paul IV and his allies in Europe to bring an end to the rising Ottoman threat. In 1560 King Philip II succeeded in organizing a Holy League between Spain, the Republic of Venice, the Republic of Genoa, the Papal States, the Duchy of Savoy and the Knights of Malta. The joint fleet was assembled at Messina and consisted of 54 galleys and 66 other types of vessels under the command of Giovanni Andrea Doria, nephew of the famous Genoese admiral Andrea Doria.

On 12 March 1560, the Holy League captured the island of Djerba which had a strategic location and could control the sea routes between Algiers and Tripoli. As a response, Suleiman the Magnificent sent an Ottoman fleet of 86 galleys and galliots under the command of Piyale Pasha, which arrived at Djerba on 11 May 1560 and destroyed the Christian fleet in a matter of hours at the Battle of Djerba. Giovanni Andrea Doria managed to escape with a small vessel, but the surviving Christians, now under the command of Álvaro de Sande, took refuge in the fort on the island of Djerba which they had constructed during the expedition. Piyale Pasha and Turgut Reis eventually forced the garrison to surrender and Piyale Pasha took 5,000 prisoners, including de Sande, to Constantinople, where he was met by joyous crowds. He married Sultana Gevher Han, daughter of Suleiman's son Selim II.

In 1563 Piyale Pasha captured Naples and the fortresses around the city on behalf of France, but after the Ottoman forces left the city the French could not hold on to these and the Spaniards eventually took them back.

== Siege of Malta ==
In 1565 Piyale Pasha, together with the general Kızılahmedli Mustafa Pasha and Turgut Reis, was charged by Suleiman with the capture of Malta, but the effort failed in the face of determined resistance by the Maltese Knights, costing the Ottoman fleet not only large numbers of casualties, but also the life of Turgut Reis.

In 1566 Piyale captured the island of Chios and brought an end to the Genoese presence in the Aegean Sea. He later landed on Abruzzo, Molise, and Apulia in Italy and captured several strategic fortresses, including Francavilla al Mare, Ortona on August 10, but failing to take Pescara

In 1568 he was promoted to Vizier, becoming the first admiral in Ottoman history to reach this rank.

== Conquest of Cyprus ==
In 1570 he set sail for Cyprus, then a Venetian possession, with a large invasion force on board his ships. Having left Constantinople on 15 May 1570, the fleet arrived at Cyprus on 1 July 1570. On 22 July the Turks, under the command of Lala Mustafa, commenced the siege of Nicosia, capturing the city on 9 September. After capturing Paphos, Limassol and Larnaca in rapid succession, they surrounded Magosa (Famagusta), the final Venetian stronghold on the island, on 18 September 1570 and finally took it on 1 August 1571, completing the conquest of Cyprus.

== Final assignments ==
After the defeat of the Ottoman fleet under the command of Müezzinzade Ali Pasha at the Battle of Lepanto in 1571, Piyale Pasha was called to take back the command of the Ottoman navy. The Ottomans managed to rebuild a fleet as large as that lost at Lepanto in less than a year, and Uluç Ali Reis reconquered Tunisia from Spain and their Hafsid vassals in 1574.

In 1573 Piyale Pasha once again landed on Apulia in Italy. This was his final naval expedition.

== Death ==
Piyale Pasha died on 21 January 1578 and is buried at the Piyale Pasha Mosque in Istanbul which he had built, under the direction of the architect Mimar Sinan, in his final years.

== Issue ==
On 17 August 1562 he married Gevherhan Sultan, daughter of future Sultan Selim II and Nurbanu Sultan and granddaughter of Sultan Süleyman I.

They had two sons and three daughters:

- Ayşe Atike Hanımsultan (1563-1614/1616). She married Doğancıbaşı Kerim Ağa. Atike died around 1614/1615, shortly before the birth of Ahmed I's daughter Atike, who was named in her honor.
- Sultanzade Mehmed Pasha (d. 1593). Firstly governor of Peloponnese, until his uncle Murad III, at the request of his mother, appointed him to the position of governor of Herzegovina.
- Sultanzade Mustafa Bey. Probably died in infancy.
- Fatma Hanımsultan. Married to some Ibrahim Bey.
- Hatice Hanımsultan. She married Sinanpasazade Mehmed Pasha in November 1598, until Ahmed I executed him in 1605. It is not known if she remarried. Her palace (known as Piyale Pasha Palace) was left to Ismihan Kaya Sultan after her death.

== Legacy ==
Several warships of the Turkish Navy have been named after him.

== See also ==
- List of Kapudan Pashas
- Ottoman Navy

== References and sources ==
- E. Hamilton Currey, Sea-Wolves of the Mediterranean, London, 1910
- Bono, Salvatore: Corsari nel Mediterraneo (Corsairs in the Mediterranean), Oscar Storia Mondadori. Perugia, 1993.
- Corsari nel Mediterraneo: Condottieri di ventura. Online database in Italian, based on Salvatore Bono's book.
- Bradford, Ernle, The Sultan's Admiral: The life of Barbarossa, London, 1968.
- Wolf, John B., The Barbary Coast: Algeria under the Turks, New York, 1979; ISBN 0-393-01205-0
- The Ottomans: Comprehensive and detailed online chronology of Ottoman history in English.
- Turkish Navy official website: Historic heritage of the Turkish Navy (in Turkish)
