= Şehinşahname =

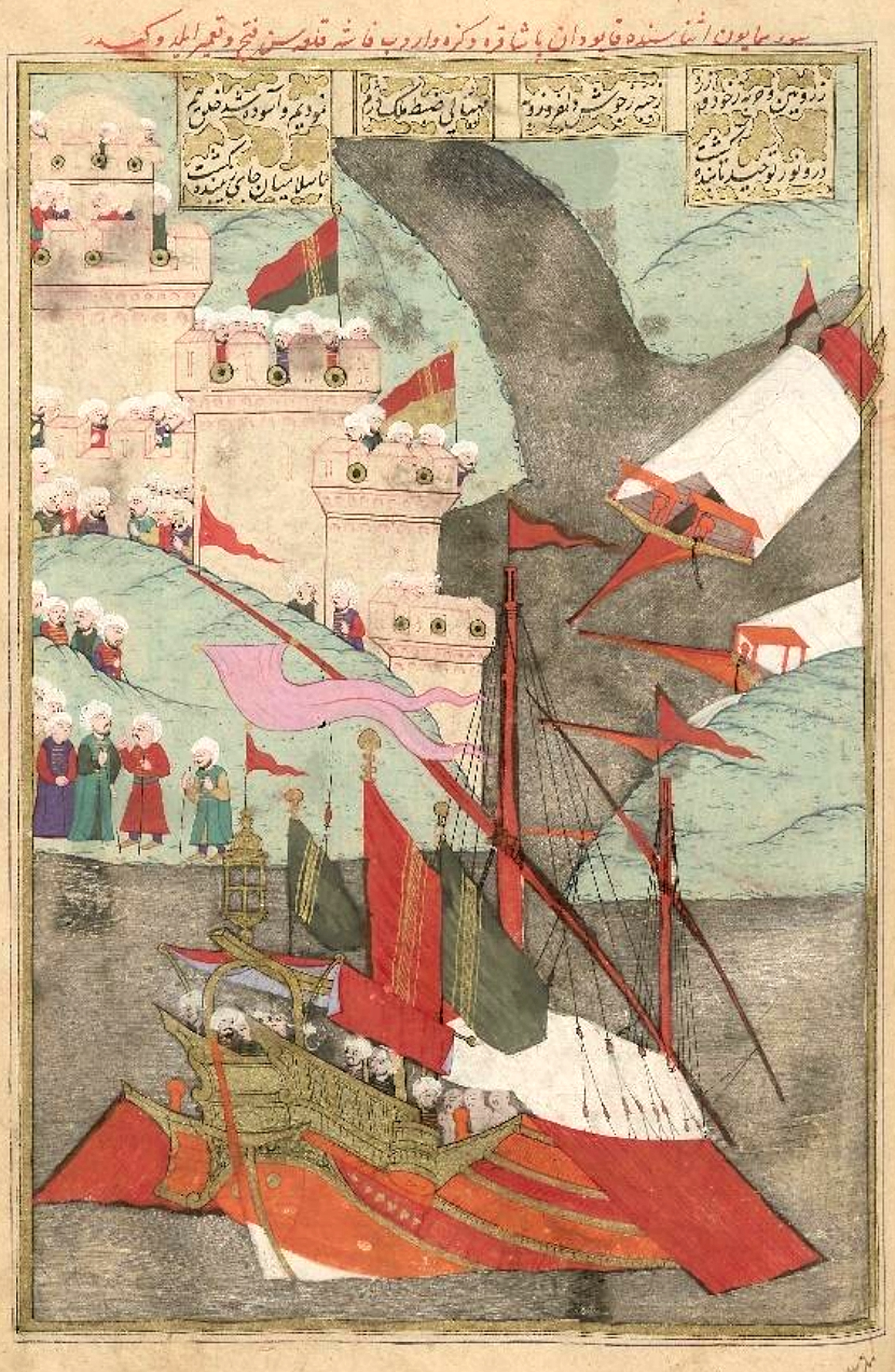
- Kılıç Ali Pasha's conquest of Faş Castle and repair of the castle (1578-1579). Sehinsahname II
- Author: Seyyid Lokman
- Publication date: 1597

Şehinşahname, also Şahanşahname (Ottoman Turkish: شاهنشاه‌نامه, "Book of the King of Kings") or Şehnâme-i Sultan Murad III, is an Ottoman manuscript covering the events from 1581 to 1588. One copy is in Museum of Topkapı Palace (TSMK, B.200). The author of the work is Seyyid Lokman b. Hüseyin al-Aşûrî al-Urmevi, who also worked on the Hünername and Surname. The miniatures for the work were made by Nakkaş Osman and his team.

There are two known versions of the Şehinşahname based on the collaboration between Lokman and Osman:

- The first Sehinsahname, describing events between the years 1574-81 during Murad III's reign (IUK, F.1404)
- The second Sehinsahname, describing events between the years 1581-88 during Murad III's reign (TSMK, B.200)

The second Sehinsahname was completed in Persian verse in 1592, and was copied and presented to Sultan Mehmet III, son of Murat III, in 1597.

Nakkaş Osman was the chief illustrator of the various official histories written by Seyyid Lokman for Murad III that were produced in this era, including the Zafername (Book of Victories), the Şahname-ı Selim Han (Note: Ms. Or. 7043, British Library) (Book of Kings of Selim Khan) and the Şehinşahname (Book of King of Kings).

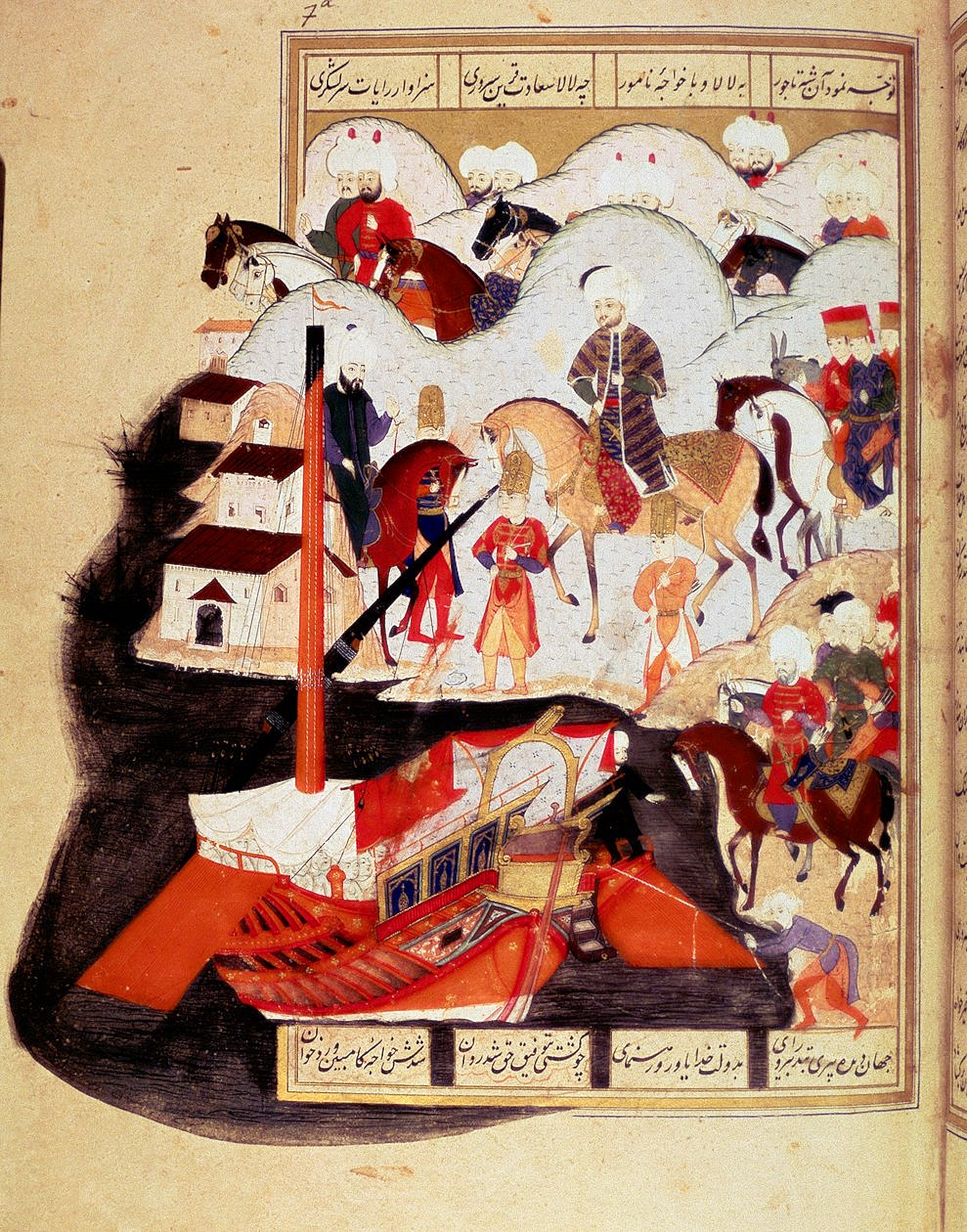
Sultan Murad III (1574-1595) Visiting the Port of Constantinople. Sehinsahname I

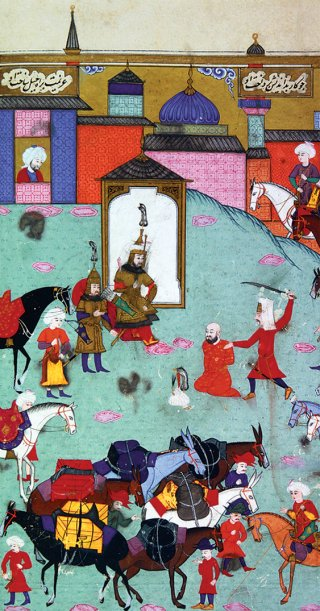
Excecution of Safavid commander Aras Khan. Sehinsahname I

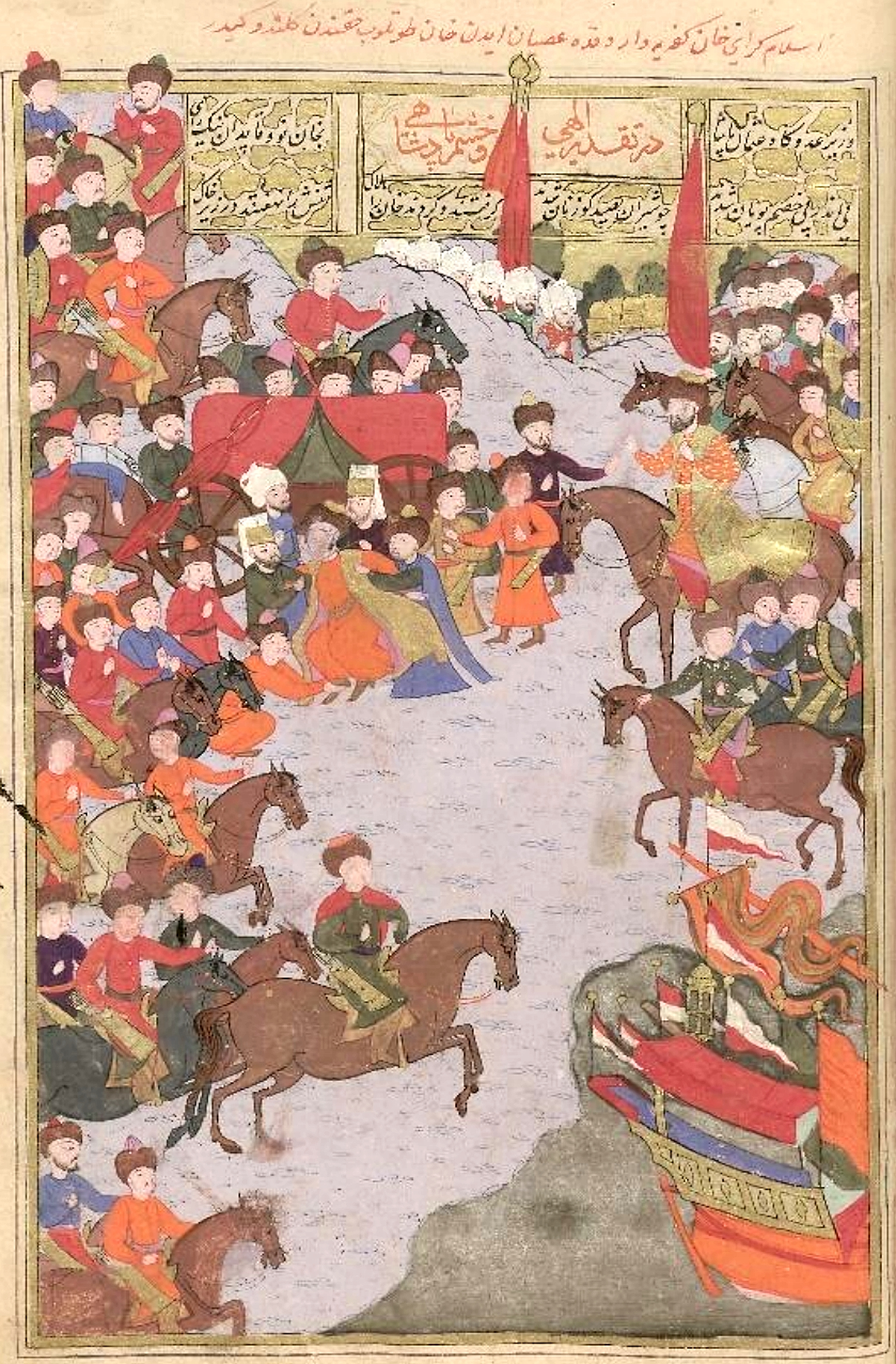
Mehmed II Giray captured by Crimean Tatars supporting İslâm Giray Khan

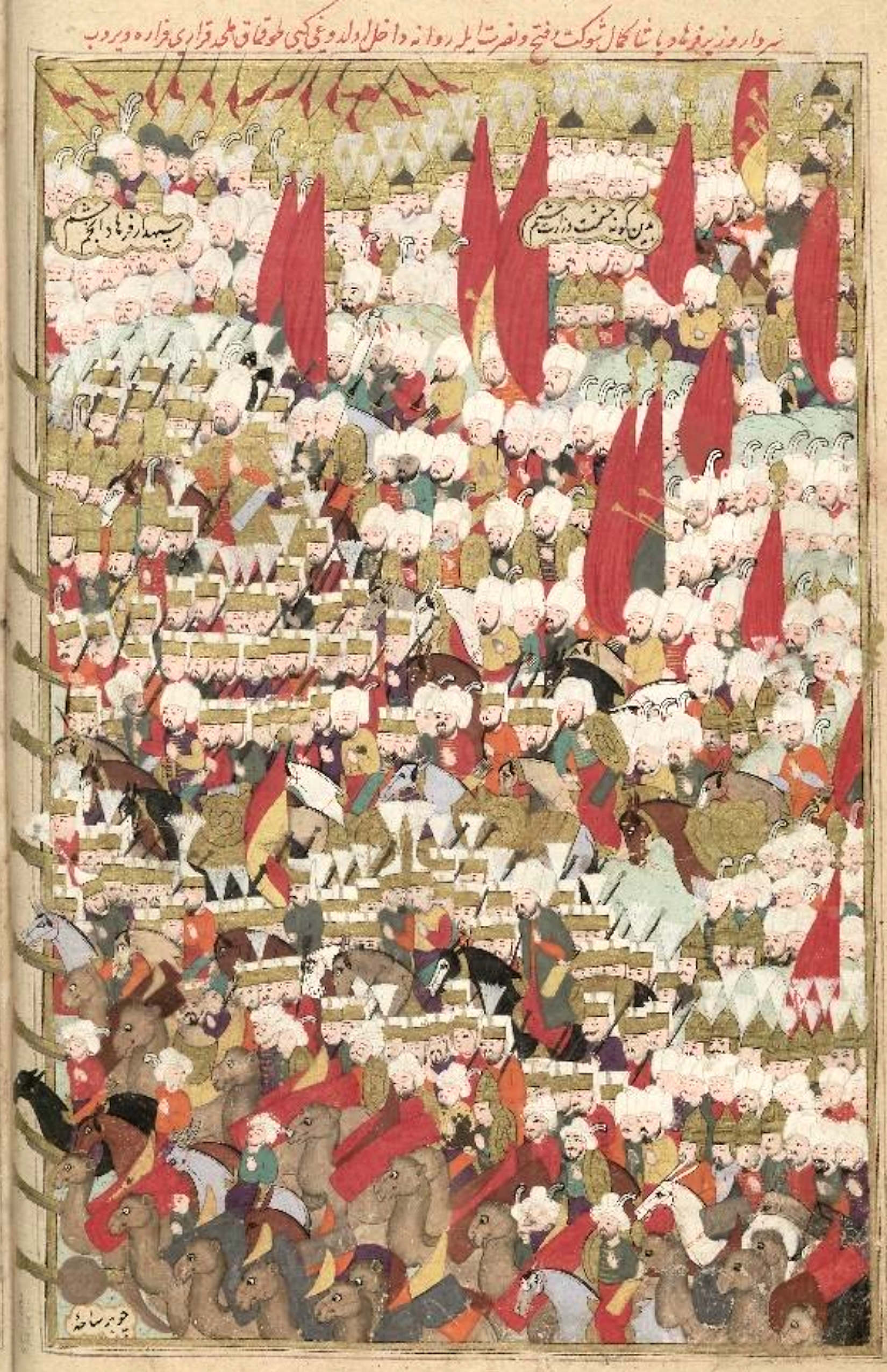
Ottoman commander Serdar Ferhat Pasha's conquest of Yerevan against Tokhmaq Khan Ustajlu in 1583. TSKM B.200 (1592).
