= Book of Felicity =

Illuminated manuscript made in the Ottoman Empire in 1582

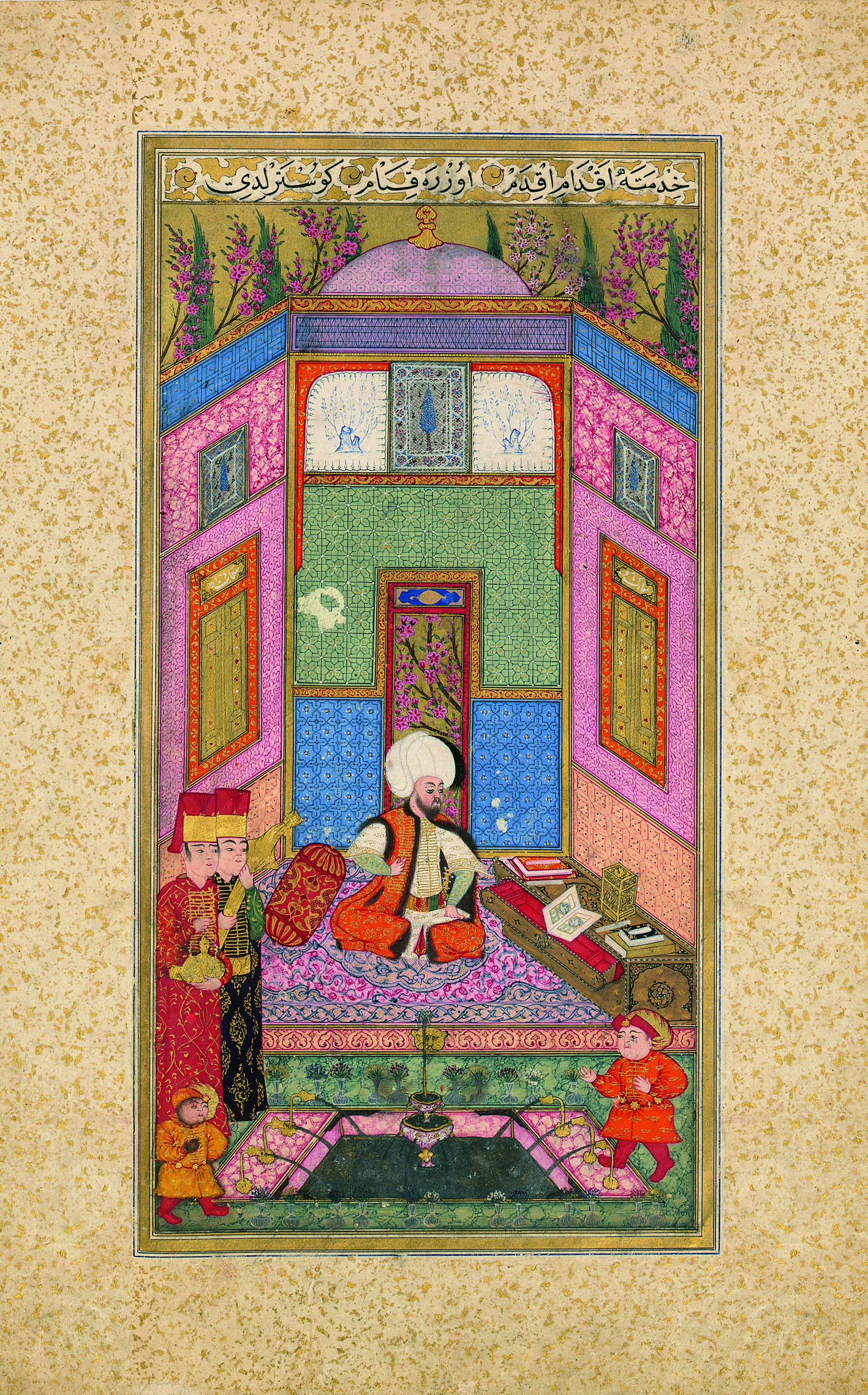
The first miniature depicts Sultan Murad III, the patron of the book (f. 7v)

Cancer (f. 14v)

The Book of Felicity (Arabic: مطالع السعادة و ينابع السيادة, romanized: Maṭāliʻ al-Saʻādah wa Yanābīʻ al-Siyādah, lit. 'The Rise of Felicity and the Sources of Sovereignty') is an illuminated manuscript made in the Ottoman Empire in 1582. Commissioned by Sultan Murad III, who ruled the empire from 1574 to 1595, its text was translated from Arabic into Ottoman Turkish and all its miniatures were apparently directed by the famous master Nakkaş Osman, who undoubtedly painted the opening series of images related to the signs of the zodiac. Osman, the head of the painters at the seraglio workshop from 1570 onwards, created a style renowned for its lifelike portraits that influenced other artists in Murad's court.

== Background ==
In the latter half of the 16th century, the domains of the Ottoman Empire stretched from Budapest to Baghdad, and Oman and Tunisia to Mecca and Medina, encompassing such great cities as Damascus, Alexandria and Cairo. The Turks also controlled the Silk Route, the Black Sea and the eastern half of the Mediterranean. The sultan governed the empire from Constantinople, where architects, painters, calligraphers, jewellers, ceramists, poets, etc., worked for him. Murad, a grandson of Süleyman the Magnificent, was a learned, sybarite sultan, a foremost patron of the arts and responsible to a considerable degree for the great development of Turkish-Ottoman painting in the 16th and early 17th centuries, deemed to be its most fertile period. His reign was also marked by constant warring with Iran and the Christian states of Europe.

Sultan Murad III was completely absorbed by the intense political, cultural and sentimental life of the harem. He had 103 children, only 47 of whom outlived him. He commissioned this treatise about felicity especially for his daughter Fatima. Murad died at Topkapı Palace in Constantinople in 1595.

== Contents ==
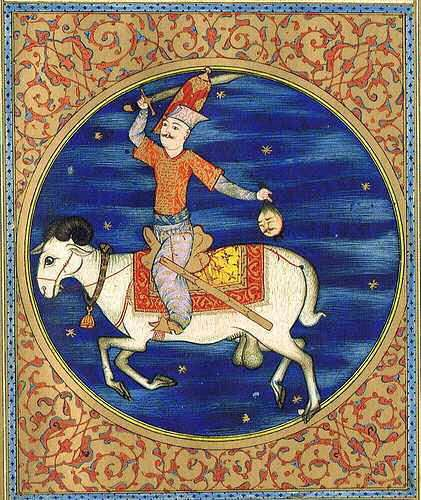
Aries (detail from f. 8v)

The Book of Felicity describes in detail the characteristic traits of those born under each of the twelve signs of the zodiac. The illustrations accompanying these descriptions include paintings of how human circumstances change according to the conjunction of the stars, several tables of physiognomical matches, several more about the correct interpretation of dreams and an enigmatic divination treatise for predicting one's future. The manuscript is a peerless testimony of the eastern world of that period, a world inhabited by mysterious characters in peculiar poses, exotic, brightly coloured garments, sumptuous palaces and mansions, and mosques. There are also countless exotic animals such as peacocks and sea serpents, and many birds whose stylised manner is clearly influenced by Japanese painting. There is also a chapter about the monsters, demons and beasts that frequent medieval Turkish imagery.

In 2007, the Spanish publishing house M. Moleiro Editor released the first and only facsimile edition of the Book of Felicity: a limited edition of 987 copies, with a companion volume of studies by Miguel Ángel de Bunes Ibarra (CSIC), Evrim Türkçelik (CSIC), Günsel Renda (professor of Ottoman art, Koç University) and Stefano Carboni (Metropolitan Museum of Art).

== See also ==
- Book of Wonders
