= Gunsel =

Gunsel is a surname and given name which may refer to:

- Austin Gunsel (1909–1974), interim commissioner of the National Football League
- Irfan Günsel (born 1981), Turkish Cypriot businessman
- Selda Gunsel, Turkish American mechanical engineer
- Suat Günsel (born 1952), billionaire Turkish Cypriot entrepreneur, businessman and founder of the Near East University
- Günsel Renda (fl. 1965–?), Turkish art historian
