= Marble Kiosk =

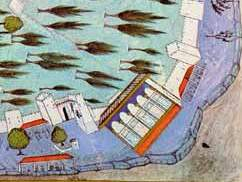
The Marble Kiosk located next to the Cannon Gate (Top kapı), from the Hünername miniature (16th century)

The Marble Kiosk (Turkish: Mermer Köşkü) was a structure directly located at the banks of the Bosphorus of Topkapı Palace in Istanbul, and served as a pleasure building for the Ottoman sultan. It was located next to the Cannon Gate (Top kapı), both structures are today lost.

Possible parts of Marble Kiosk

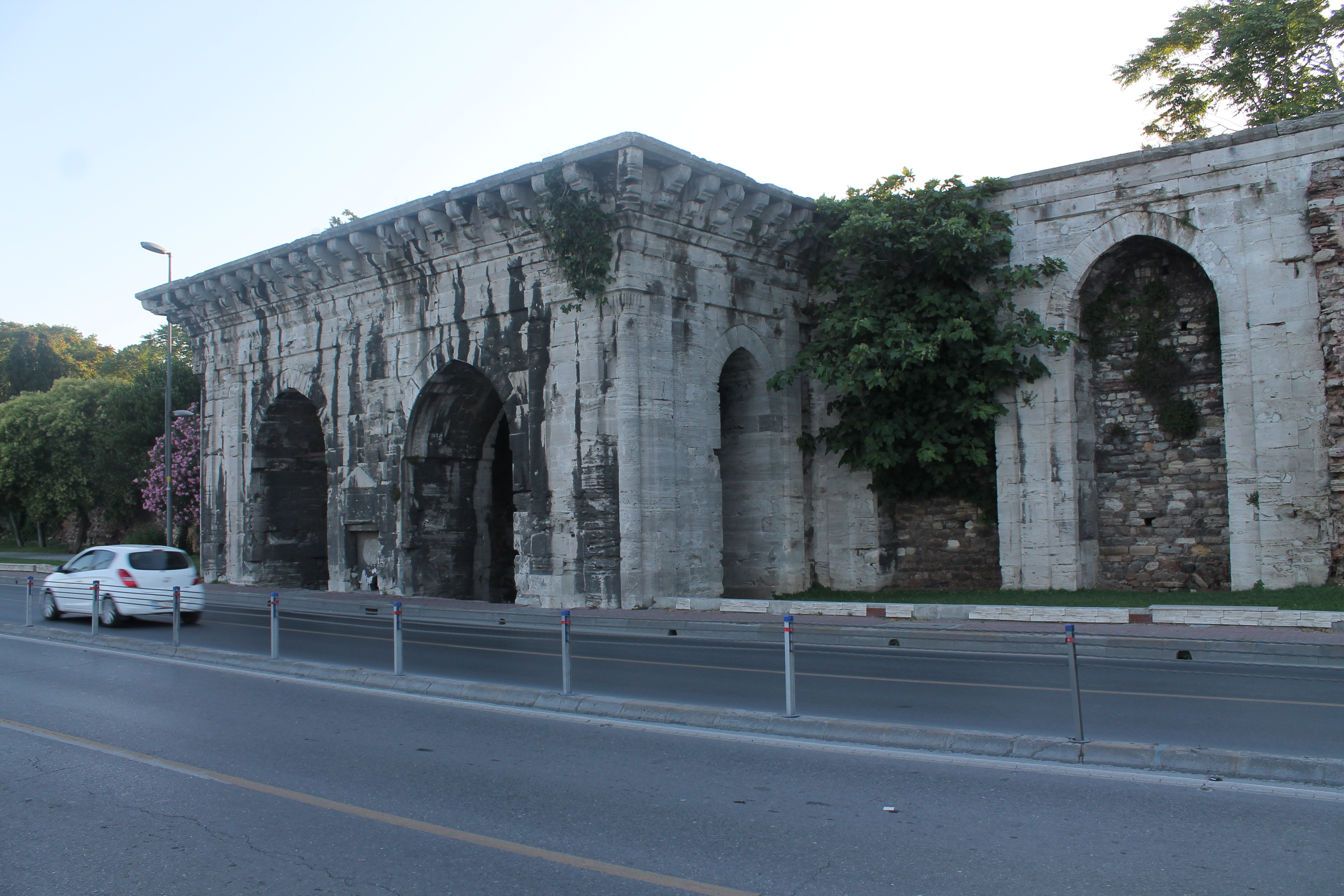

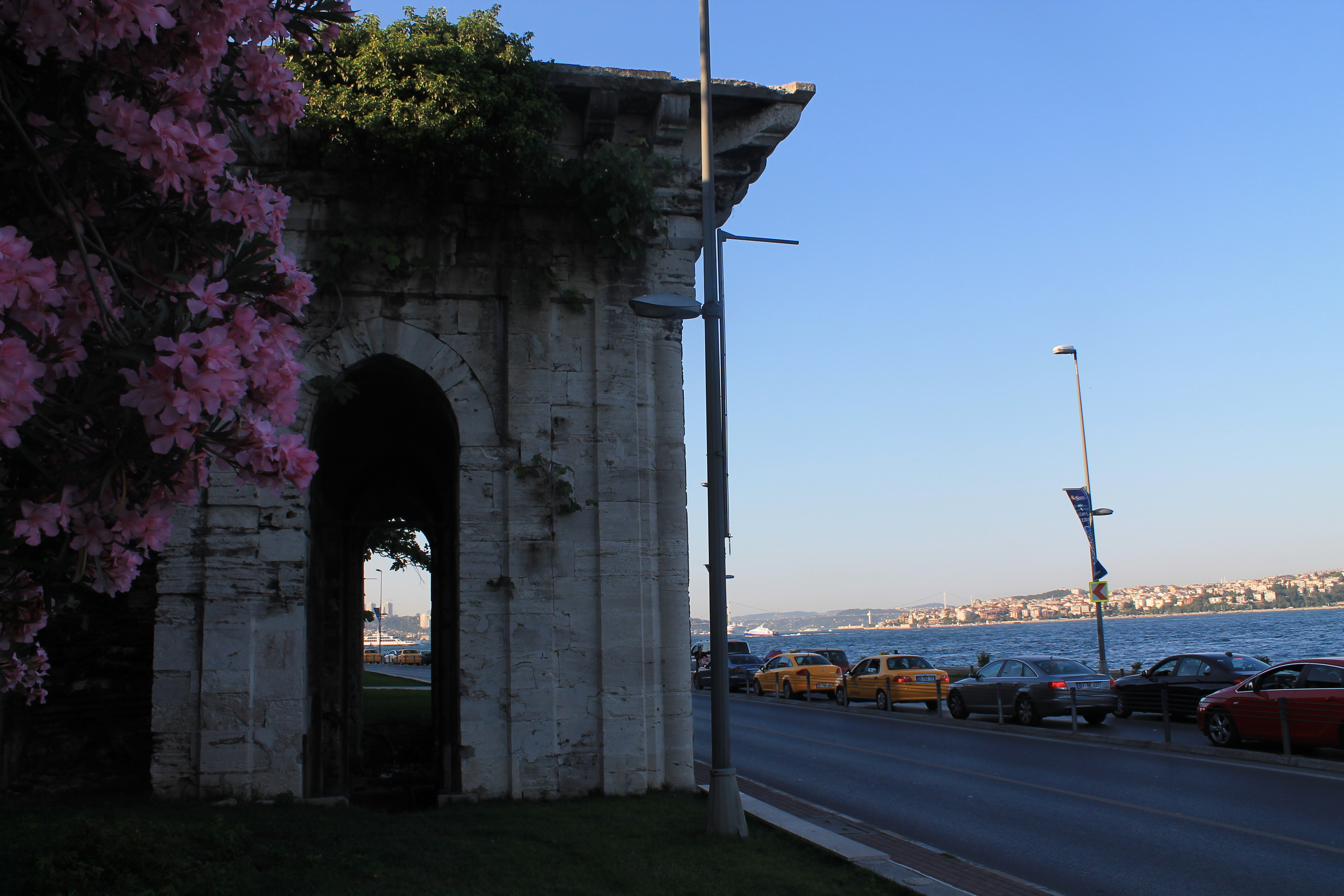

== Literature ==
- Fanny Davis. Palace of Topkapi in Istanbul. 1970. ASIN B000NP64Z2
- Necipoğlu, Gülru (1991). Architecture, ceremonial, and power: The Topkapi Palace in the fifteenth and sixteenth centuries. Cambridge, Massachusetts: The MIT Press. pp. 336 pages. ISBN 0-262-14050-0.
