= Şahname-ı Selim Han =

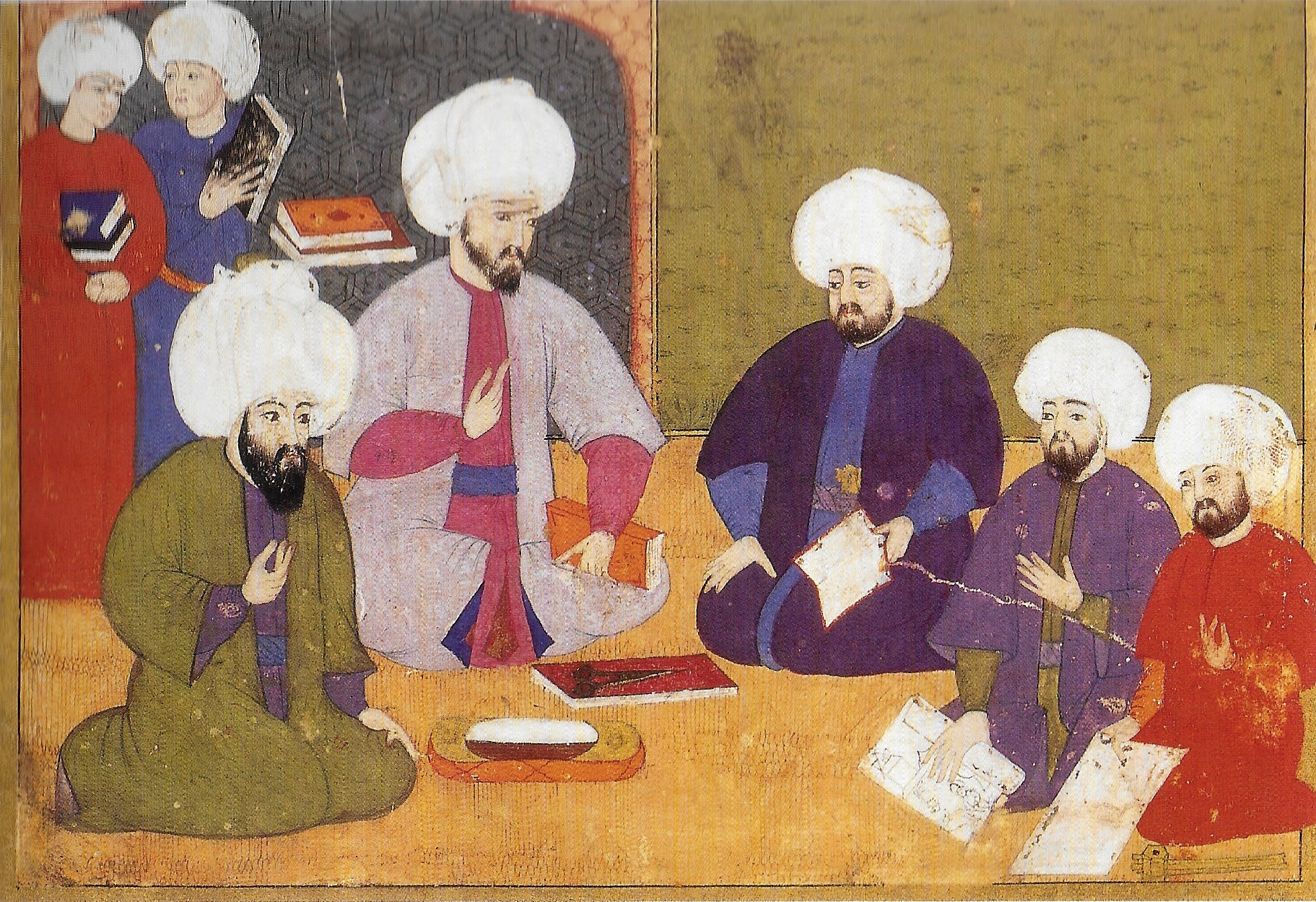
Creators of the Şahname-ı Selim Han: the scholar Ahmed Karabashi, the author Seyyid Lokman, scribe Ilyas Katib, painters Nakkaş Osman and Ali. Şahname-ı Selim Han, 1581 (TSMK A.3595, folio 9a).

The Şahname-ı Selim Han (Ottoman Turkish: شاهنامه سلیم خان, "The Book of Kings of Selim Khan", TSMK, A.3595) is one of the most characteristic examples of Ottoman miniature art, produced in the second half of the 16th century under Sultans Selim II (1566–74) and Murad III (1574–95). The creator of the manuscript was Seyyid Lokman, court-appointed Sahnameci, with illustrations being made by various selected painters working in the imperial studio. The most significant painter was Osman, mostly active in 1570–90, who essentially defined Turkish miniature art during the classical period. These manuscripts were written in Persian and in verse.

Lokman created Sahnames, chronicles of contemporary historical events. The first major work by Lokman was the Zafername ("Book of Victories", DCB, No.413) dating to the last years of the reign of Suleiman I.

The Şahname-ı Selim Han (TSMK, A.3595) was Lokman's second major work, recording the event of the reign of Selim II. This manuscript was explicitly made for Selim II, and dated 6 Zilhicce 988, that is 12 January 1581. It was copied by Ilyas Katib, and the painter was Nakkas Osman. It covers the years 1566–1574.

This was followed by the first volume of the Sehinsahname ("Book of the King of Kings", IUK, F.1404) recording the events between the years 1574-81 during the reign of Murad III. The last one Sahname produced by Lokman and illustrated by Osman was the second volume of the Sehinsahname (TSMK, B.200), which records the years 1581-88 of the reign of Murad III.

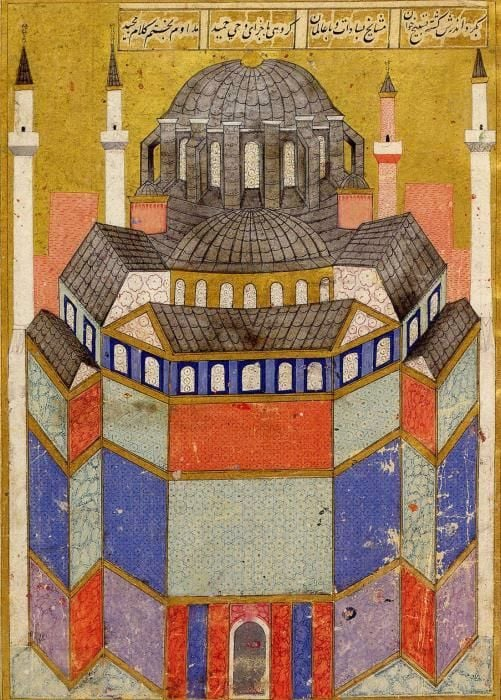
Hagia Sophia in Seyyid Lokman's Şahname-ı Selim Han

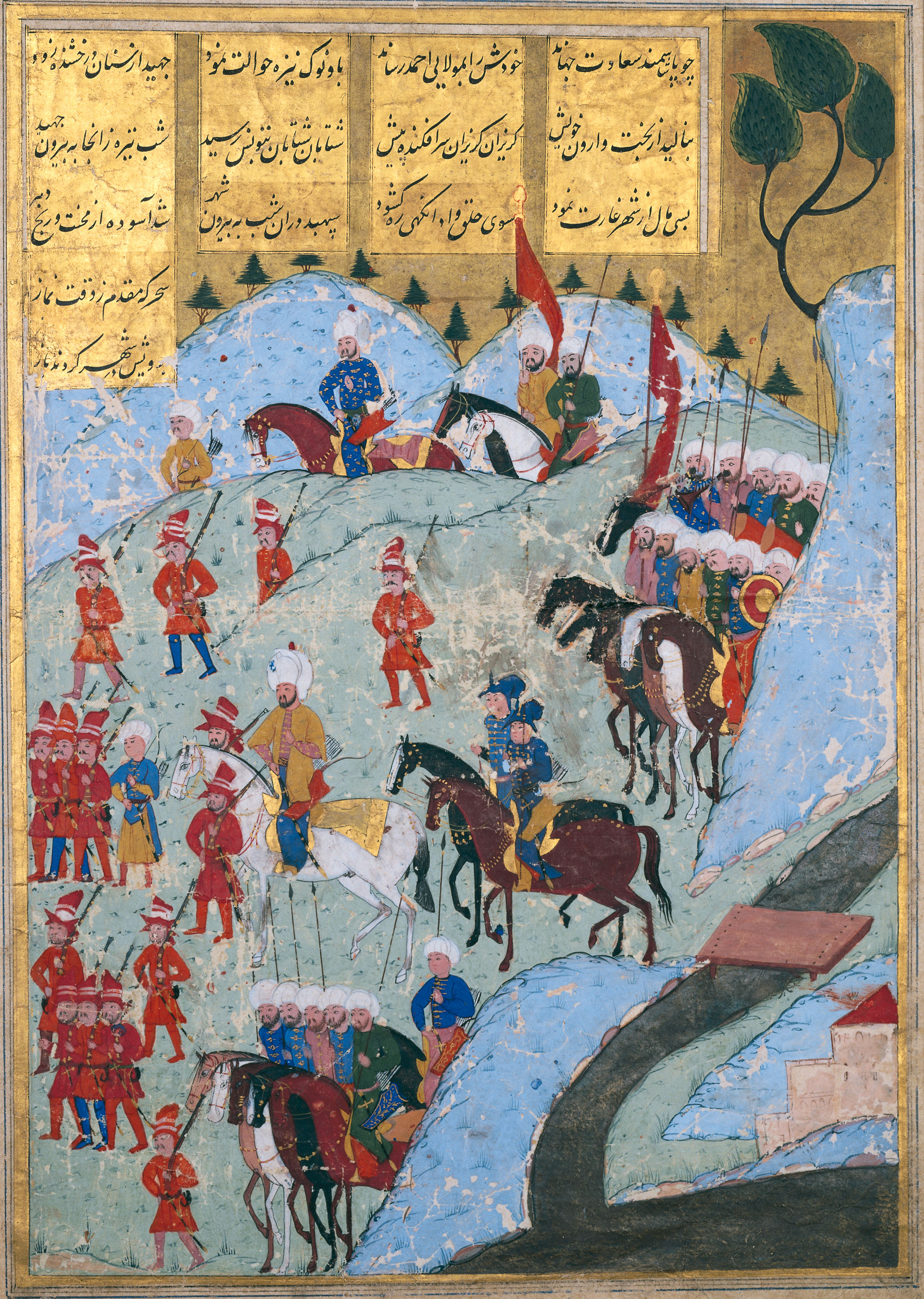
The Ottoman Army Marching On The City Of Tunis in 1569

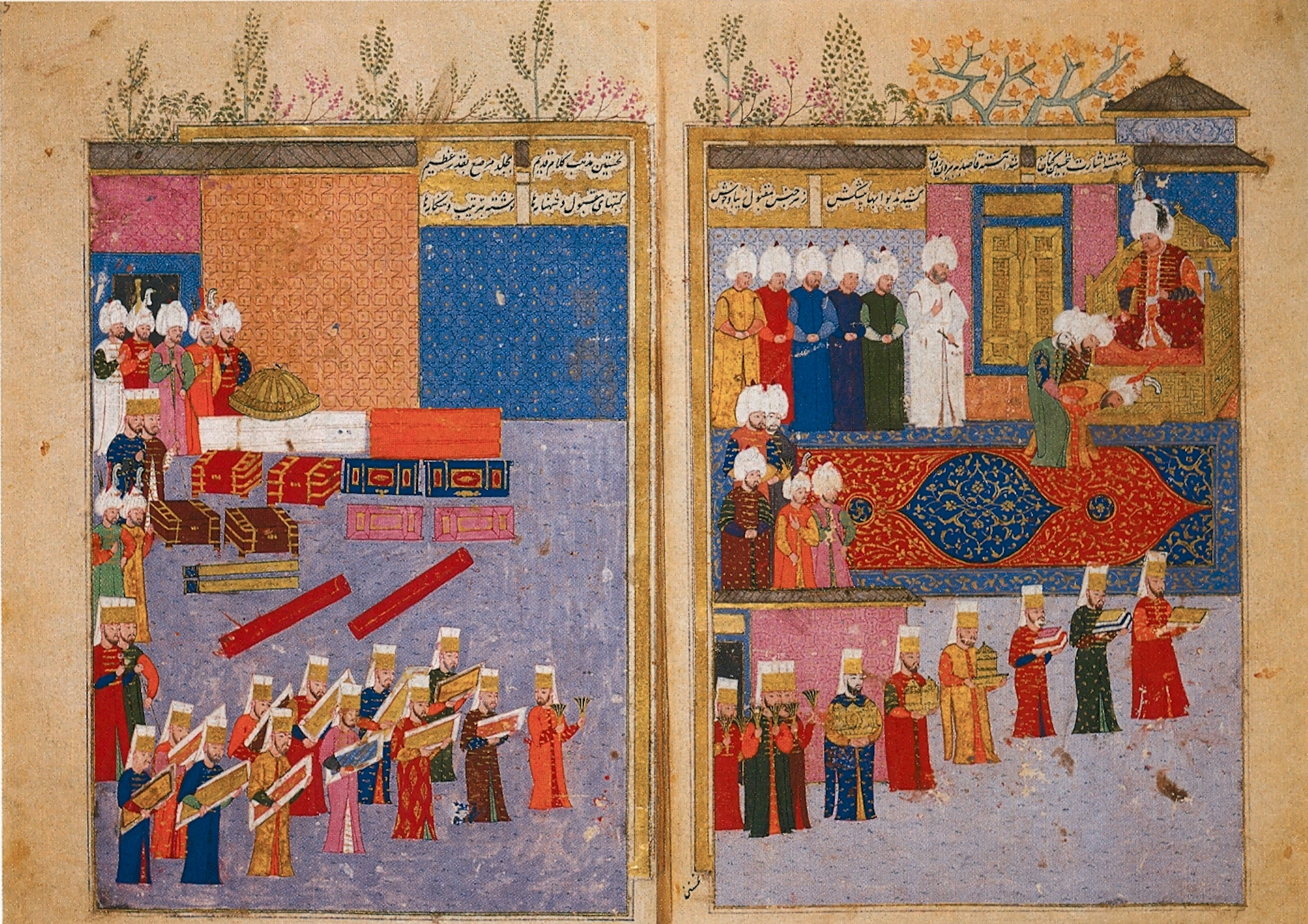
"Presentation of Gifts by the Safavid Ambassador, Shahquili, to Sultan Selim II at Edirne in 1568"

== Sources ==
- Roxburgh, David J. (2005). Turks: a journey of a thousand years, 600-1600. London : New York: Royal Academy of Arts ; Distributed in the U.S. and Canada by Harry N. Abrams. p. 269. ISBN 978-1903973578.
