= Seyyid Lokman =

Ottoman writer (fl. 1569–1596)

Sayyid Lokman
- سید لقمان
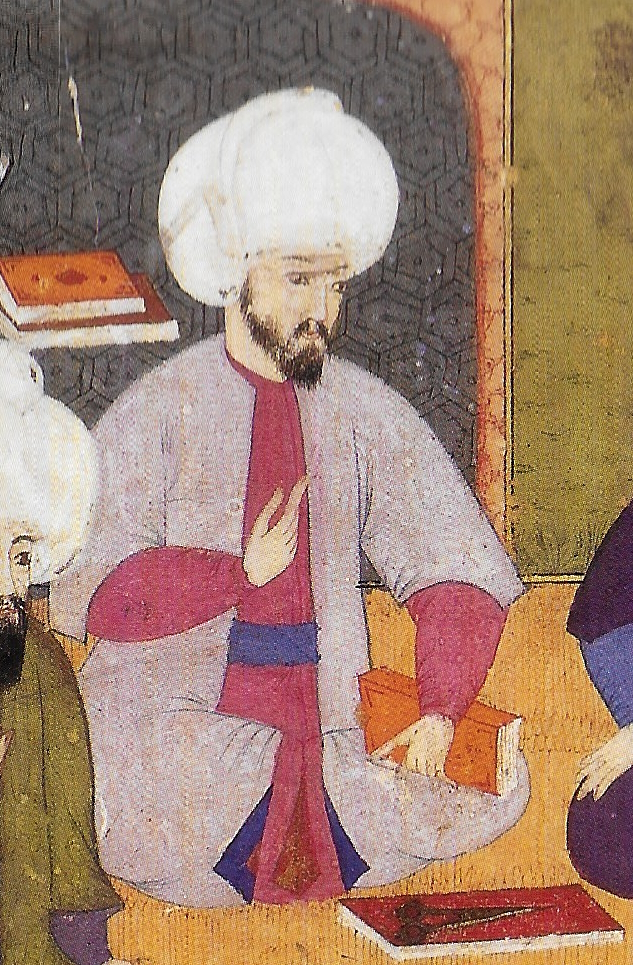
- Portrait of Seyyid Lokman. Şahname-ı Selim Han, 1581 (TSMK A.3595, folio 9a).
- Born: Sayyid Loqman ibn Hoseyn al-Ashuri al-Hoseyni al-Ormavi
- Died: 1596
- Occupations: Kadi; Writer
- Writing career
- Language: Persian; Ottoman Turkish
- Years active: fl. c. 1569 – 1596
- Works: See below

Sayyid Loqman ibn Hoseyn al-Ashuri al-Hoseyni al-Ormavi, better simply known as Seyyid Lokman (fl. c. 1569 – 1596), was an Ottoman writer, who collaborated with different artists to create numerous notable works in the genre of şehnames, or "king's books".

During the second half of the sixteenth century, the Ottoman Empire was at its artistic prime. Among its most precious objects were illustrated manuscripts that are called şehnames, or "king's books". Most şehnames consist of Ottoman dynastic history, glorious deeds of the sultans, and miniature paintings. Sehnames can be viewed as symbols of Ottoman imperial culture in book form. In order to create a series of şehnames, the Ottoman sultans employed şehnamecis, or official court historians who composed the text. The most important requirement in şehnamecis appointment was literary ability. In the process of producing the şehnames, şehnamecis chose their team of calligraphers, painters, gilders, bookbinders, and miniaturists to create the work.

== Life ==
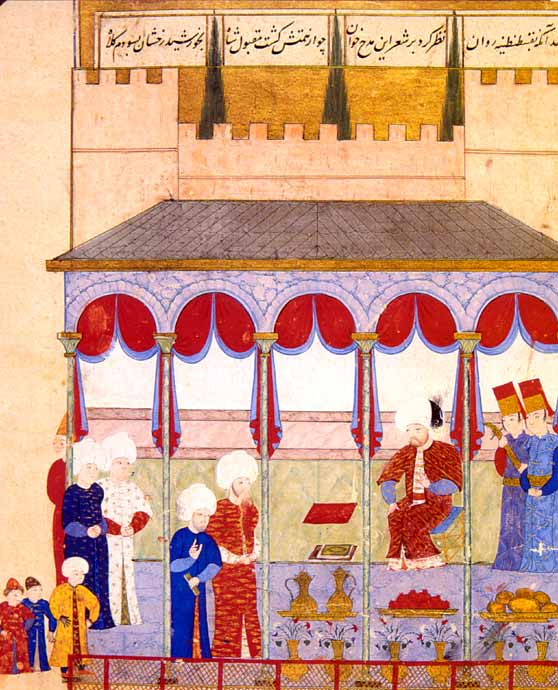
Sultan Selim II receiving Seyyid Lokman and Grand Vizier Sokollu Mehmed Pasha in the Edirne Palace, from the Şahname-ı Selim Han

Seyyid Lokman was originally from Urmia in the northwestern Iranian region of Azerbaijan. Persian was his native language. It is unknown whether he himself or his family before him migrated to the Ottoman Empire. In the early stages of his career, Lokman served as a judge, or kadı,, in provinces of the empire. As an administrative officer, he was in charge of the application of Islamic law. Lokman later held a position of private secretary for Grand Vizier Sokollu Mehmed Pasha, who worked under Sultan Süleyman from 1565 to 1579, when he was murdered. Sokollu Mehmed Pasha’s influence and patronage was a stepping stone in securing his position as a şehnameci. Lokman was the third şehnameci, after Arif Celebi (c. 1550s – 1563) and Eflatûn-ı Şirvan-ı (c. 1562 – 1569). He took the office from 1569 after Eflatûn’s death. As a şehnameci, he not only oversaw all aspects of the production of the manuscripts but also looked out for his family members as his fortunes improved. He had a son who joined the elite corps in 1589, and a nephew who was appointed to the scribal corps in 1584. During his final years as a şehnameci, Lokman had two assistants, Nutkî and Taliki-zade Mehmed (c. 1591–1600), who helped him in his work. In 1596–1597, Lokman resigned, ending his long career as the head şehnameci in the Ottoman court.

== Creative work ==
While Seyyid Lokman held posts as a judge and personal secretary in his early years, his most notable position was as the şehnameci. The Grand Vizier Sokollu Mehmed Pasha was the primary patron for Lokman’s work while he was şehnameci. He began his post in office during the end of the reign of Sultan Selim II (reigned 1566–1574), though most of his work was produced during the rule of Murad III (reigned 1574–1595).

The position of şehnameci came to fruition after the rise in popularity of the şehname genre in the Ottoman Empire. The original Shahnama was an epic poem written by the Iranian poet Firdawsi and contained the history and legendary actions of Iranian kings and heroes. This story was originally orally recited in market places and courts and grew in popularity amongst both the elite upper class as well as the literate poor. The early military victories of the Ottomans were likened to those in the Shahnama and created a link between the sultan and the Iranian heroes in the story. This eventually led to an adaption of the Sehname genre in Ottoman literature. With this, the position of şehnameci was born under Sultan Süleyman. Its style and composition continued to develop over the subsequent years of Mehmed II (reigned 1451–1481) and Bayezid’s Rule (reigned 1481–1512). The title, şehnameci, means the writer of şehname and it equated to the court historian. The original adaption of the şehname genre into Ottoman culture remained in Persian verse, even though focused on contemporary events rather than historical or mythical ones. During Lokman’s tenure as şehnameci, the nature of the language used to record history in the Ottoman Empire was changing. There was a growing preference for prose rather than the verse that was classically used, Persian was replaced by Turkish as the principal language of şehnames.

Seyyid Lokman was appointed as the third şehnameci at the end of Sultan Selim II's reign. He was originally appointed because of his ability to compose Persian couplets in the mesnevi style (a form of rhymed couplets in the mutearib meter). As şehnameci, Lokman held both an administrative and creative position, he was responsible for not only composing the text for the projects the sultan approved, but he was also in charge of coordinating its production. These responsibilities included assembling a team of artisans to make the manuscript (scribes, painters, illuminators and bookbinders), determining their salary, and gathering the materials needed. He recruited artisans on a project basis, pulling from the corps of artisans who were already employed to work on other projects, making them comparable to freelance artists rather than a permanently hired group.

It was originally believed by scholars that the position of şehnameci was a very prestigious and permanently salaried one. When Lokman held the position it had a salary of 30,000 aspers, and he received project-based raises ranging from 10,000 to 20,000. However, in reality, his salary did not increase that much due to inflation at the time. The title of şehnameci still held a great deal of weight and prestige though, allowing Lokman to become a member of the imperial servants or Muteferrika. The post of şehnameci was originally believed to be a full-time appointment, but its permanency has come into question because there was no permanent studio dedicated to Lokman, and because of his second source of income as the Financial Director or Defterdar of the Muteferrika corps.

When Grand Vizier Mehmed Sokollu Paşa died in 1579, Lokman was left to find a new patron for his work. He attempted to gain the patronage of other wealthy members of the court. These efforts were reflected in his work – he would not only write about the sultan in a favorable light but also his potential patrons, emphasizing the contributions and positive characteristics of each. This need for a patron shows how the elite and wealthy shape the image and history of the Ottoman Empire that left behind.

== List of works ==
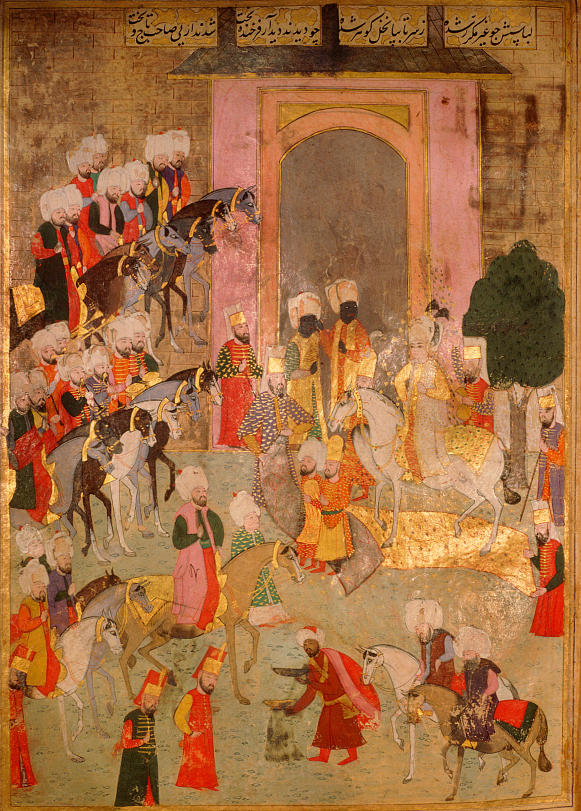
Circumcision ceremony-Mehmed III (1)

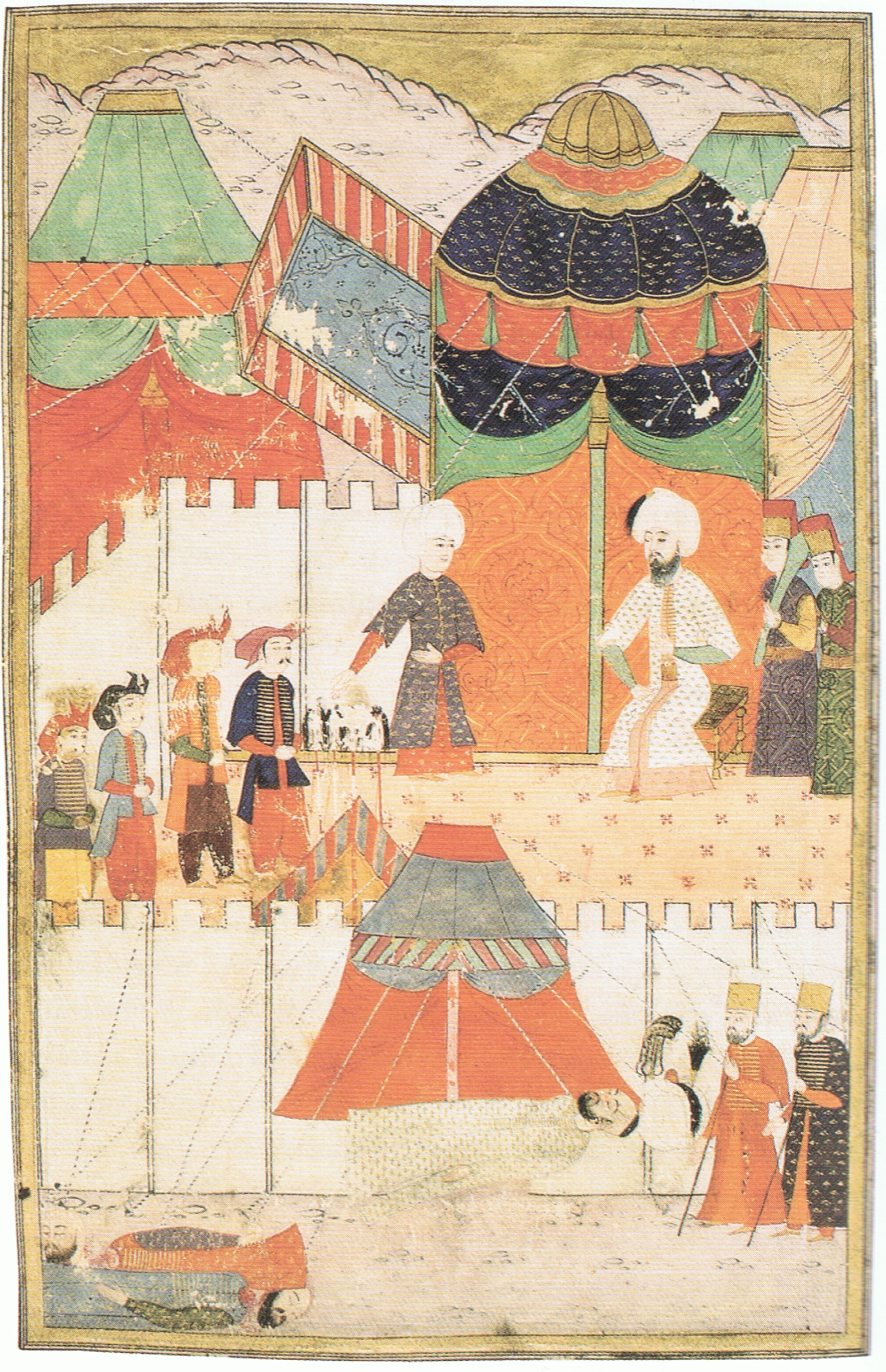
Hunername 168b Mustafa

There were about fifteen notable şehnames produced in the 50-year span of the şehnameci post's existence. Lokman was the most prolific of the şehnamecis, composing ten of the fifteen major works. Of these, five are written in Persian verse, four in Turkish prose, and one in Turkish verse. Additionally, Nakkaş Osman, the chief miniaturist in the late 16th century, worked on numerable illuminations of Lokman's şehnames. Some of the most famous works Lokman produced or supervised were the History of Sultan Süleyman, Şehname-I Selim Han, Şehinşehname, Hünername, Zubtedu’t tevarih, Kiyafetu’l-ins aniye fi sema’il-u’l-Osmaniye, and Surname.

=== Zafername (Book of Victories) ===
The first major work by Lokman was the Zafername ("Book of Victories", DCB, No.413) dating to the last years of the reign of Suleiman I. It doubles with some of the material from an earlier manuscript: History of the Szigetvár Campaign (1568–69), by Feridun Ahmed Bey.

=== Şehname-I Selim Han (Book of Kings of Selim Khan) ===
Şehname-I Selim Han (Book of Kings of Selim Khan) was completed in the year of 1581. The content was mostly about the representations of various kinds of terrains around the Mediterranean and peoples with different ethnic backgrounds. More than half of the illustrations were about the battles of Selim II’s commanders suppressing its rivals, underlining Ottoman superiority and heroic efforts. The manuscript also emphasized the accomplishments of the viziers Sinan Paşa and Lala Mystafa Paşa.

=== Şehinşehname (Book of King of Kings) ===
Şehinşehname (Book of King of Kings) was a two-volume account of the reign of Murad III. It not only portrays the Ottoman dynastic myths but also sheds light on how to rule justly and successfully. In addition to Murad III, Lokman also promotes the vizier’s military skills and financial contributions. The way Lokman praises the sultan’s courtiers equally or more than he does to the sultan indicates that Lokman caters to the shifting power wielders.

=== Hünername (Book of Skills) ===
Hünername (Book of Skills) is one of the most famous Ottoman manuscripts which was completed by Lokman in 1579–1580. It is connected in two volumes and contains 89 miniatures mainly about the history of Sultan Süleyman, Selim II, Murad III, and Sokollu Mehmed Pasha. There were around 69 people working on this şehname, and it was stored in the library of Topkapi Palace after its completion.

=== Zubtedu’t tevarih (The Cream of Histories) ===
Zubtedu’t tevarih (The Cream of Histories) was written in 993 under the commission of Sultan Murad III, and it was written in two parts. The first part is a broader record of history, including the creation of the universe and zodiacs, stories from religious texts and the genealogical framework stretching from Adam to Muhammad, the Shi’ite imams, and different caliphs. The Second part of this text begins with the founding of the Ottoman Empire by Sultan Osman and illustrates its history until the reign of Murad III.

=== Kiyafetu’l-ins aniye fi sema’il-u’l-Osmaniye (Human Physiognomy and the Disposition of the Ottomans) ===
The Semailname (Kiyafetu’l-ins aniye fi sema’il-u’l-Osmaniye, "Human Physiognomy and the Disposition of the Ottomans") was created in 1579 by Lokman and illustrated by Nakkaş Osman. It is a portrait album that describing the facial and physical features of the twelve rulers of the Ottoman dynasty from its founder to Murad III. The manuscript also indicates the role of the sultan and the vizier.

== Influences ==
Seyyid Lokman was highly influential for historical accounts written following his accounts, such as later Ottoman histories, yet his work was inspired by foreign and past sources as well. Lokman’s accounts reflect European histories such as a work by Paolo Giovio, called Elogia vivorum bellica virtute illustrium, which possibly influenced his Ottoman accounts of sultan genealogy leading back to Muhammad. The Elogia contained oil painted portraits of Ottoman sultans, which interested Sokollu Mehmed Pasha, the grand vizier of the time. Using European models as inspiration shows how Lokman wanted to show the international knowledge that the Ottoman Empire had, while also emphasizing the Ottoman Empire as superior. The paintings featured in Lokman’s works, including in the Şema’ilname (1579), show a direct correlation to the European accounts because of the artistic differentiation of rulers illustrated in the paintings. Both the European accounts and Lokman’s accounts look to ancient historical examples for physiognomy inspiration, meaning both empires used facial features to differentiate ethnicities in paintings. However, the actual content of the accounts differed. The Ottoman histories contained only Ottoman genealogy while European accounts included international rulers too. The Şema’ilname was a work produced by Lokman that ultimately was made for the sultan in power at the time, known as Murad III.

Drawing from Ottoman content rather than foreign content, Lokman only included Ottoman Sultans in the Şema’ilname, to show the lineage and importance of Islamic leaders and them only. This is an aspect that differs from the European examples because they typically included leaders from external geographies, and even Ottoman sultans. Persian artistic culture was also used as inspiration for the historical accounts because of their tradition of exclusive genealogy and mention of Ottomans as their heirs. Historical works such as Hünername and Zubtedu’t tevarih, written by Lokman, show an emphasis on the history of Ottoman leaders. Additionally, Lokman uses past Islamic historical accounts, such as the şehname, as resources to model the new stories after. Specifically, he uses these works to help portray the sultans as military and political heroes, which comes from the şehname writings.

Seyyid Lokman’s work and position inspired historical accounts to follow in Islamic and foreign cultures. Lokman’s work as an appointed historian was influential because of his hand in shaping the Ottoman style of historical accounts. The use of both past and foreign ideas created a new Ottoman style, which gave examples of how to or how not to document history. European empires in the 16th and 17th centuries, such as Kings of England, Scotland, and France, were familiar with the Ottoman Empire having a court historian and used this as a model to create a historian job position in their own empires. Moreover, Lokman’s historical accounts were both for history and propaganda, since the works mainly included the historical accounts that the historians and sultans thought would be most impressive and positive to current external cultures and future Islamic cultures.

== Conclusion ==
In the later 16th century, Ottoman sultans were less visibly active in participation of warfare and government. Throughout Lokman’s career, Selim II and Murad III had ceased to go to war with their armies. After Murad III, Mehmed III (1595–1603) and Ahmed I (1603–1617) paid little attention to şehname writing. Therefore, the increasing impossibility of depicting the Ottoman sultan as a war hero and the decline of the composition of şehname started to undermine the position of şehnameci. After Lokman’s appointment as şehnameci, there were only two successors left: Taliki-zade and Hasan Hukmi (1601) respectively. After them, the post of şehnameci was terminated. Although the post only existed for about 50 years, the five successive şehnamecis produced fifteen notable history works in total. Lokman was the most prolific one who composed ten out of the fifteen şehnames.

Seyyid Lokman was considered a treasure to the Ottoman Empire and the modern world. He played a key role in the court since he held an administrative and creative position. Lokman also oversaw all aspects of production, from the composition of the text to the presentation of the final projects, showing his competency. On top of that, taking the inspirations of historical works from Europe and combining the idea with his own, Lokman’s work and position inspired historical accounts. He shaped the Ottoman style of historical accounts utilizing both past and foreign ideas. The şahnames Lokman produced can be considered as propaganda which glorifies and eulogizes sultans as heroes as well. Overall, Seyyid Lokman had a significant role in history because of his devotion to documenting history and creating a series of şahnames.

== Sources ==
- Roxburgh, David J. (2005). Turks: a journey of a thousand years, 600-1600. London : New York: Royal Academy of Arts; Distributed in the U.S. and Canada by Harry N. Abrams. ISBN 978-1903973578.
