= Semailname =

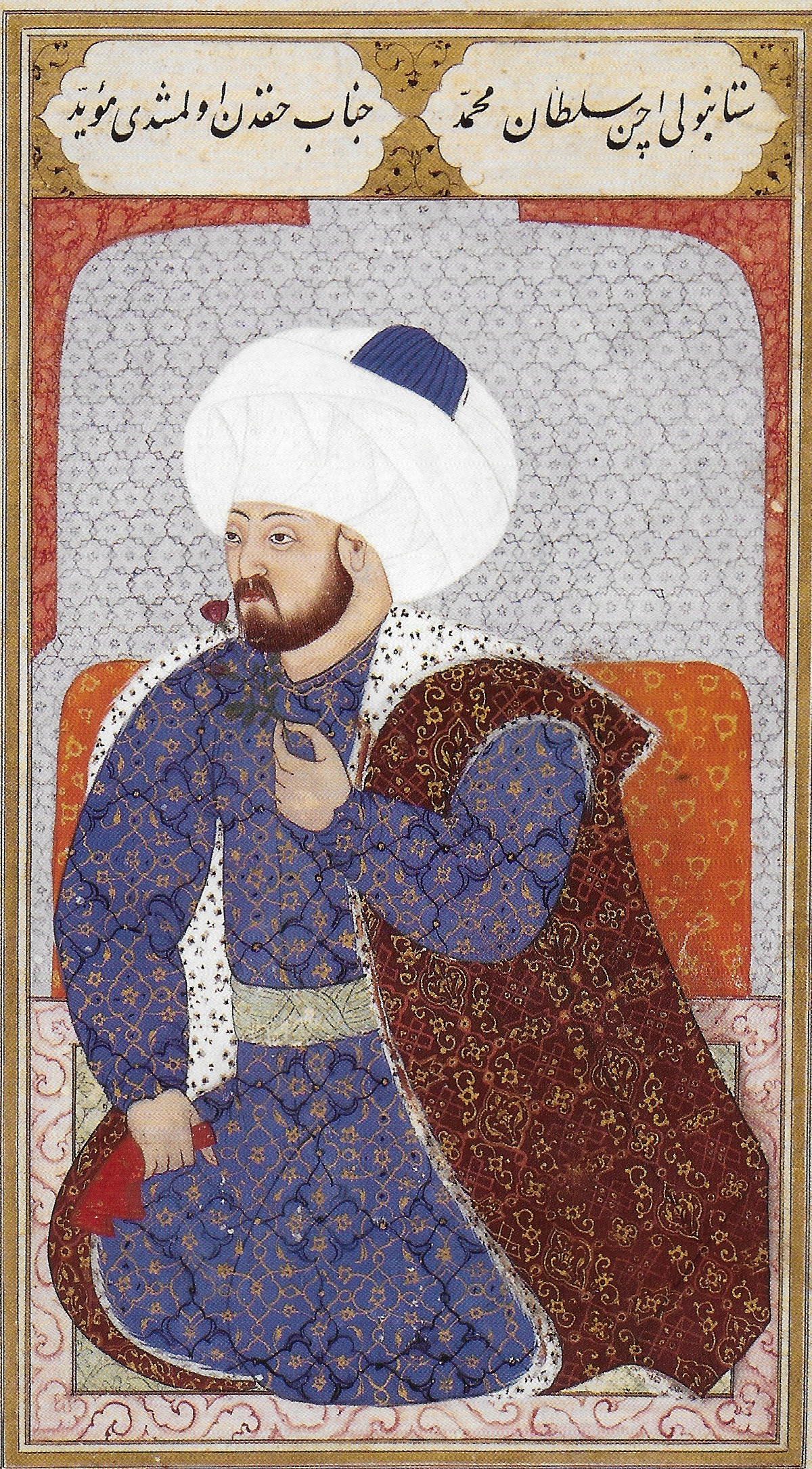
Portrait of Mehmet II. Human Physiognomy Concerning the Personal Dispositions of the Ottomans, 1579 (TSMK H.1563)

The Semailname (Şemâilnâme, "Book of characteristics", full title Kıyâfetü’l-insâniyye fî şemâili’l-osmâniyye, "Human Physiognomy Concerning the Personal Dispositions of the Ottomans", TSMK H.1563) is a 1579 manuscript created by Seyyid Lokman Ashuri, its miniatures being painted by Nakkash Osman. The term "Şemâilnâme" comes from the Arabic shamā’il (traits, characteristics) complemented with the Persian/Turkic -nâme (book).

This manuscript resulted from a project launched by the Grand Vizier Sokollu Mehmed Pasha, to create the portraits of all the Ottoman Sultans up to that point, starting with Osman I and ending with Selim II. The book describes the personal characteristics and characters of the first twelve sultan, and is accompanied by a portrait for each. Great care was taken to be as accurate as possible, and extensive research was made of all the available portraits available at that time, to obtain the most faithful rendering of each Sultan.

Numerous later copies of the initial manuscript (TSMK H.1563) were made. There is a copy in the Istanbul University Library (Semailname al-i Osman, T.Y. 6087), also dated 1579.

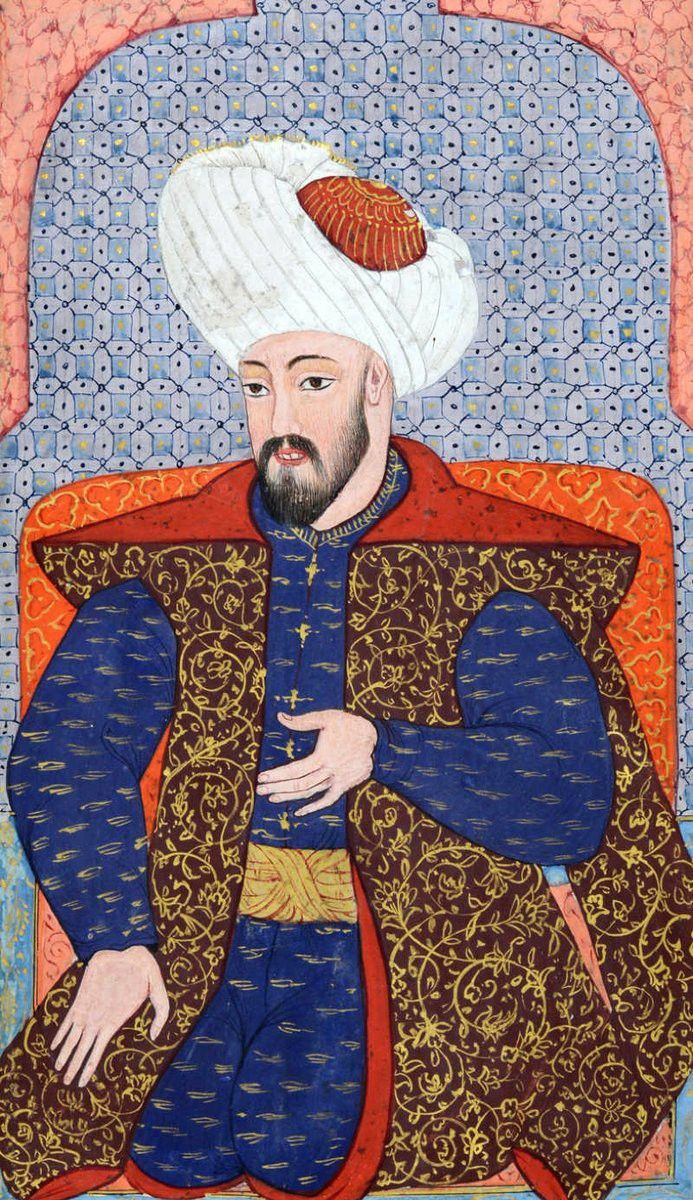
Osman I

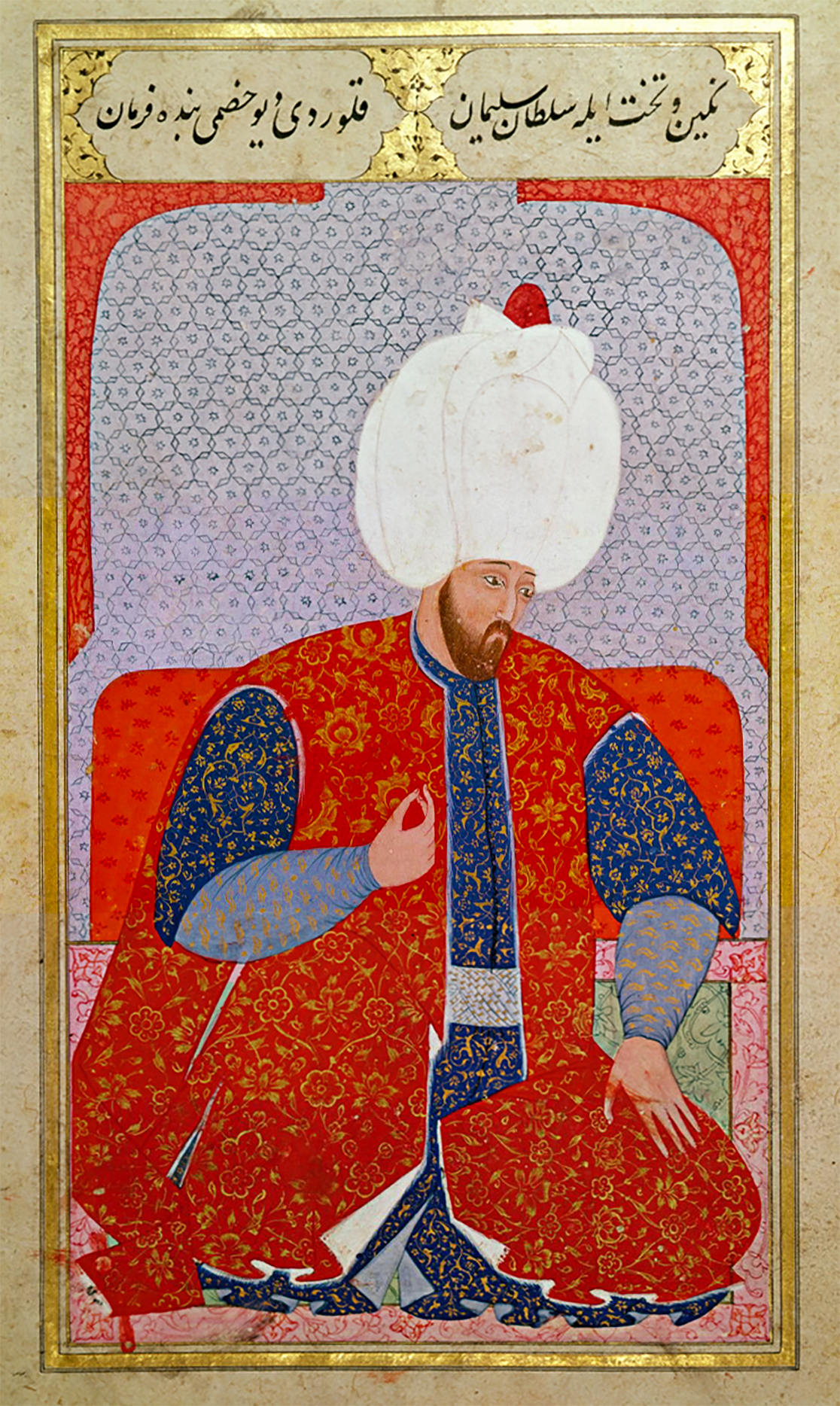
Suleyman I

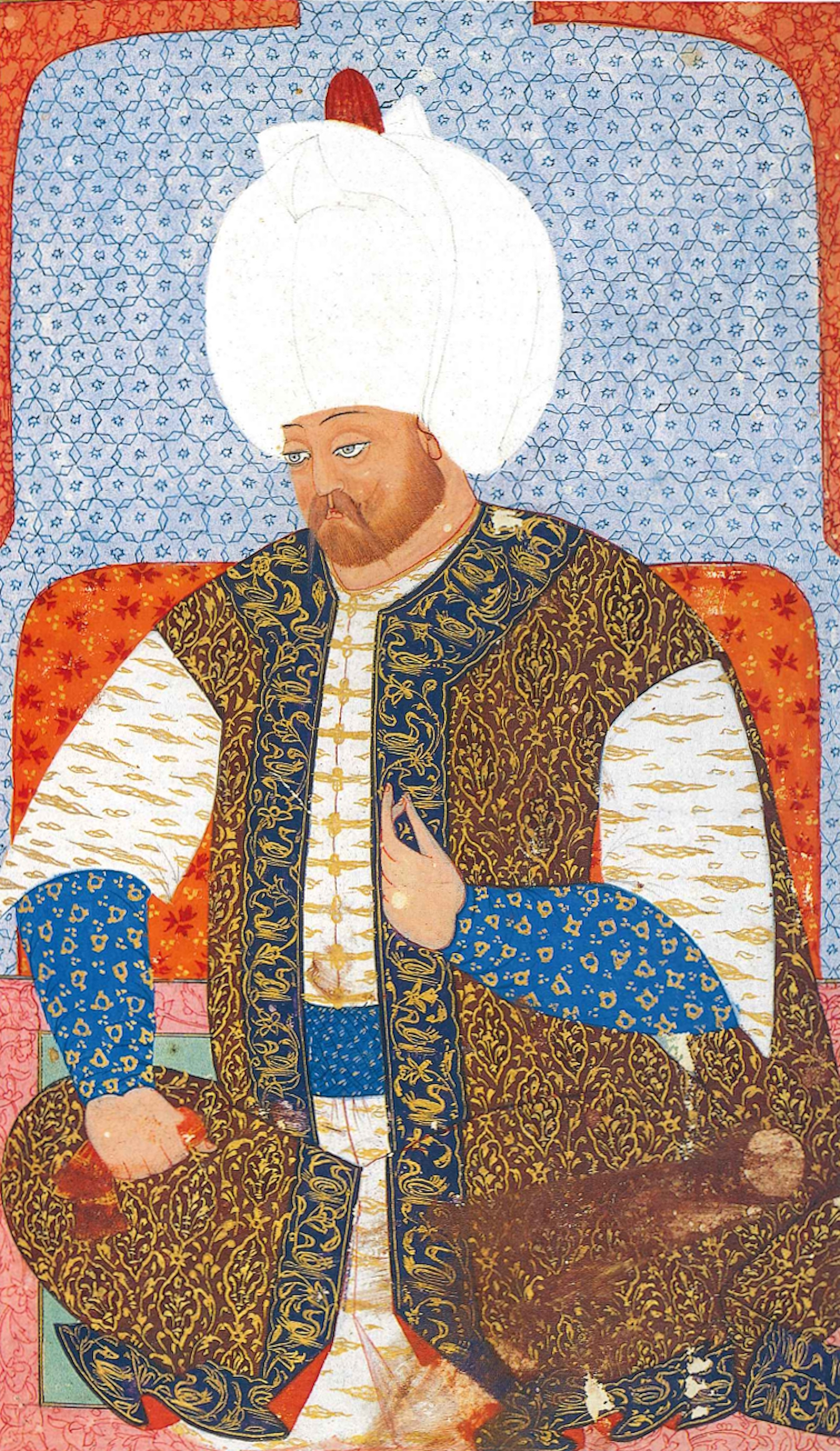
Selim II

== Sources ==
- Roxburgh, David J. (2005). Turks: a journey of a thousand years, 600-1600. London : New York: Royal Academy of Arts ; Distributed in the U.S. and Canada by Harry N. Abrams. ISBN 978-1903973578.
