= Nakkaş Osman =

16th century Ottoman artist

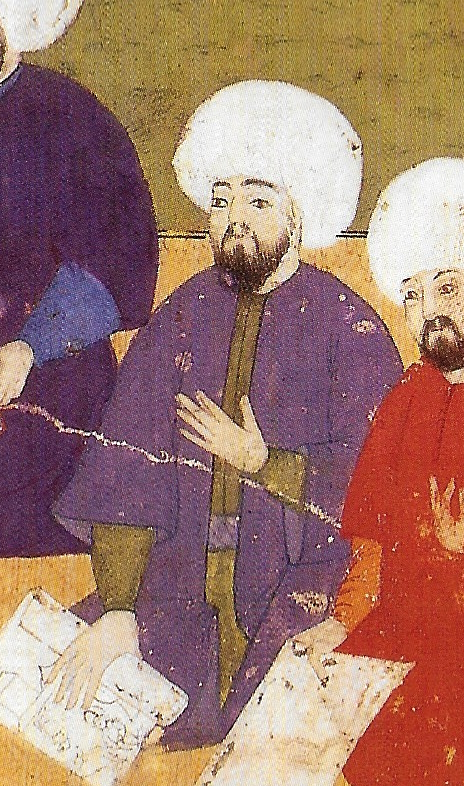
Portrait of Nakkaş Osman. Şahname-ı Selim Han, 1581 (TSMK A.3595, folio 9a).

Nakkaş Osman (sometimes called Osman the Miniaturist (Note: Nakkaş meaning miniaturist)) was the chief miniaturist for the Ottoman Empire during the later half of the sixteenth century. The dates of his birth and death are poorly known, but most of his works are dated to the last quarter of the sixteenth century.

The oldest known illustrations of Nakkaş Osman's were made between 1560 and 1570 for a Turkish translation of the epic Persian poem Shahnama by Ferdowsi. He is known to have been the chief illustrator of the various official histories written by Seyyid Lokman for Murad III that were produced in this era, including the Zafername (Book of Victories), the Şahname-ı Selim Han (Note: Ms. Or. 7043, British Library) (Book of Kings of Selim Khan). the Semailname (Book of characteristics) and the Şehinşahname (Book of King of Kings). In 1582 he worked on the astrological Book of Felicity, and around 1585 he was one of the illustrators of the Siyer-i Nebi, an epic on the life of Muhammad written around 1388.

== Style ==
Osman's illustrative style has been described as "plain, yet perceptive". His illustrations show careful attention to the most minute detail, depicting events in a realistic style.

Osman's portraits tend to display more emotion than those of previous court artists. The tale of Rostam and Sohrab, for example, had heretofore always been represented the same way, with peripheral characters who appear "distant, detached, and still, [and who] scarcely display any trace of facial or bodily expression", whereas in Osman's version (Note: Sehname-i Türki, H. 1522, folio 148. Topkapi Palace Library) Sohrab's groom looks to be "collapsing with grief and shock" as he witnesses Rostam killing his own son.

His work influenced the next generation of court painters in the Ottoman Empire, with the important works of this era derived from his style.

== Literature ==
Nobel Prize-winner Orhan Pamuk's novel My Name Is Red is a fictional account of Osman and his workshop. In the story, Osman blinds himself with a needle, emulating the blindness of the legendary miniaturist Bihzad. In the novel his dying represents "the end of the Ottoman miniature" because after him, the miniaturists follow the art of the West.

== Miniatures ==
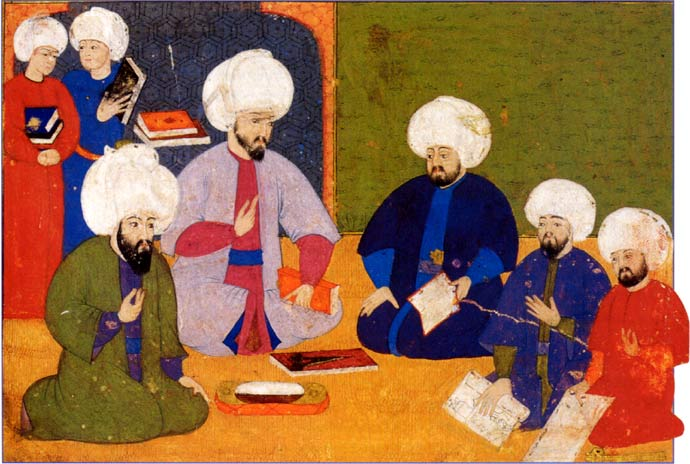
The consultation for the programme of the Şahname-ı Selim Han, with the scholars Şemseddin Ahmet Karabaği, Seyyid Lokman, the writer Ilyas Katib and the painters Nakkaş Osman and Ali, 1571–81 (folio 9r)

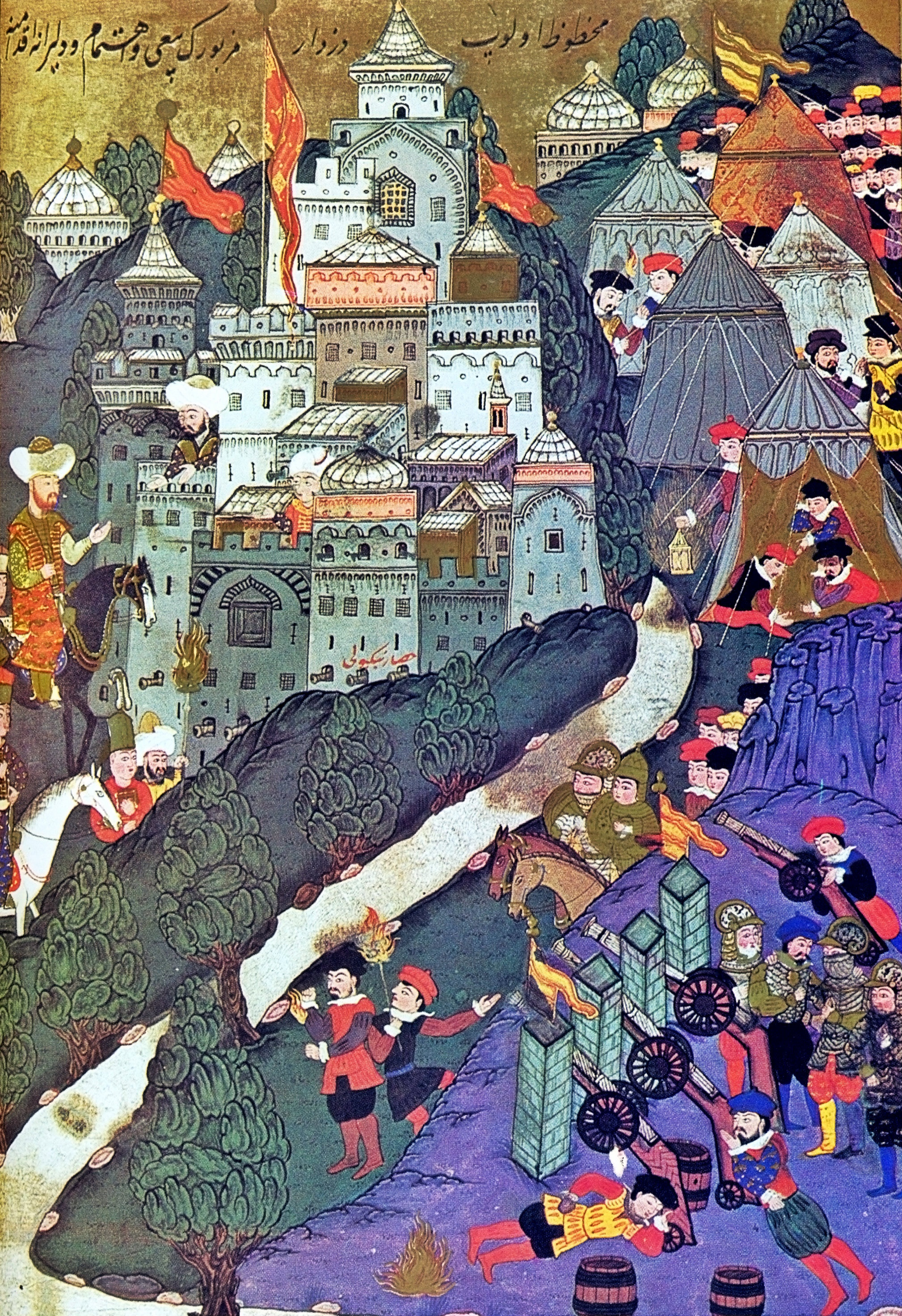
Depiction of the 1396 Battle of Nicopolis from the Hünername, 1584–88

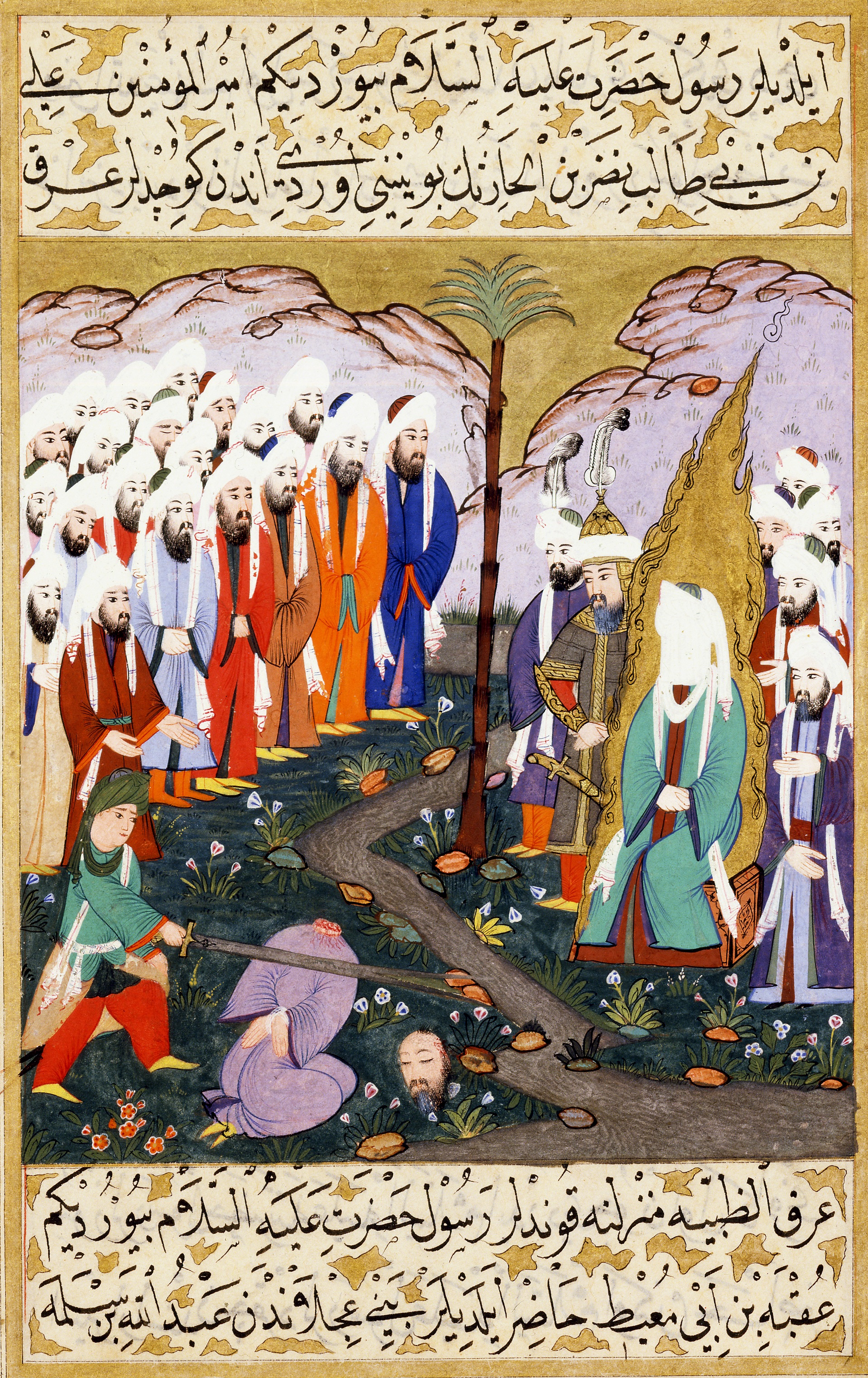
Ali beheading Nadr ibn al-Harith in the presence of Muhammad, from Sultan Murad III's Siyer-i Nebi, 1595

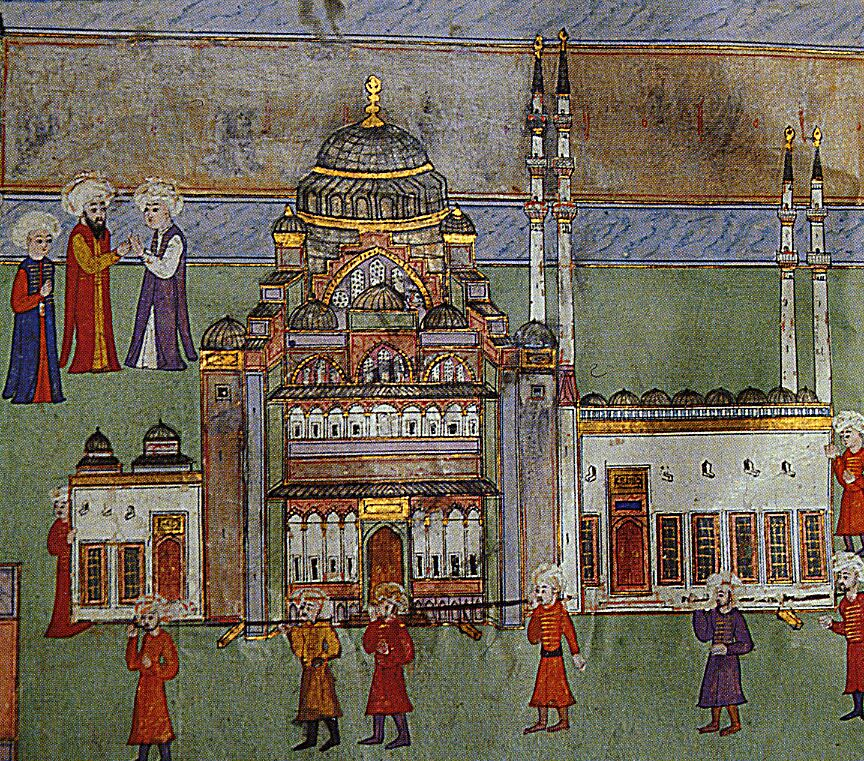
The carrying-in of a model of Süleymaniye Mosque from Surname-i Hümayun, 1582

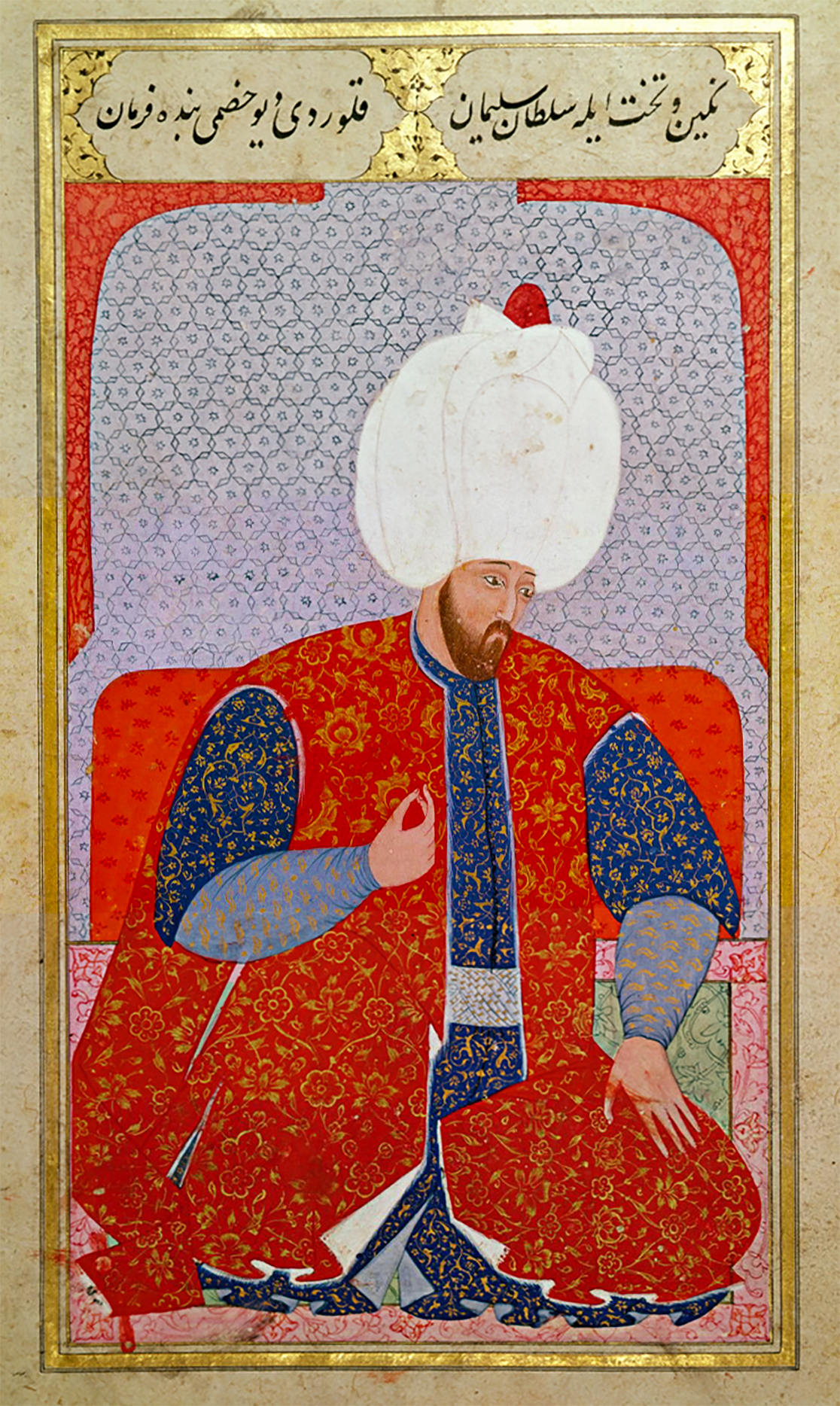
Portrait of Suleiman the Magnificent, Sultan of the Ottoman Empire from 1520 to 1566, from the book Semailname

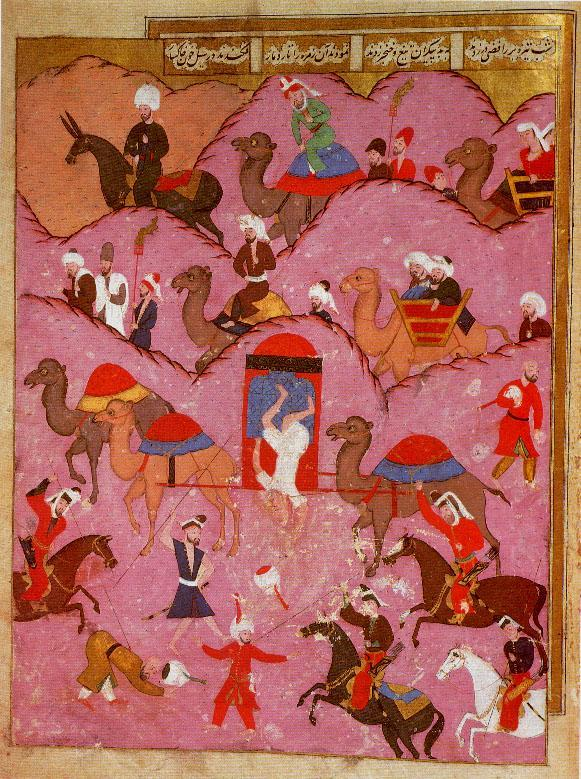
Murder of Ma'sum Beg, the envoy of the Safavid Shah Tahmasp, by Bedouin in the Hejaz, from the Şahname-ı Selim Han (folio 68a)

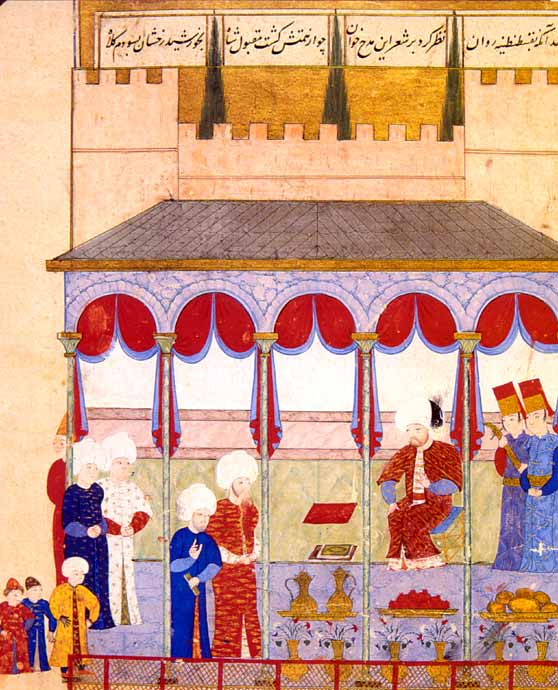
Sultan Selim II receiving Seyyid Lokman and Grand Vizier Sokollu Mehmed Pasha in the Edirne Palace, from the Şahname-ı Selim Han

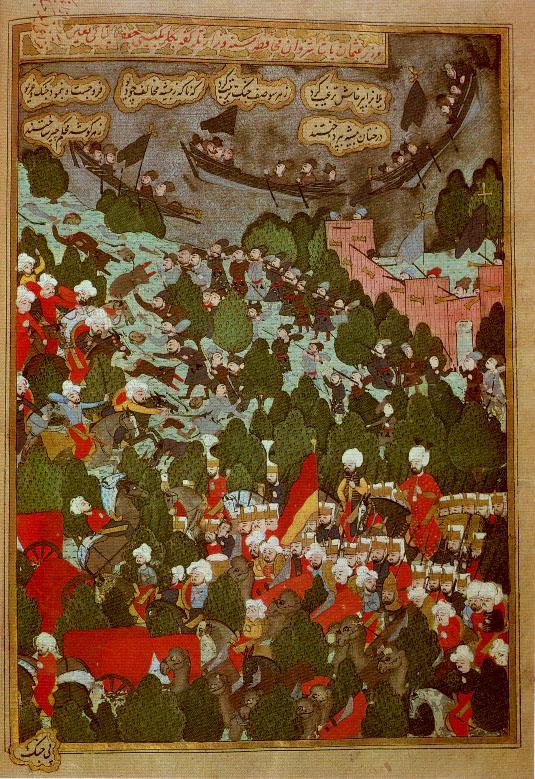
Osman Pasha and Ja'far Pasha, Ottoman governor of Shirvan, in battle against the Cossacks, from the Şehinşahname, 1597–98 (folio 130b)

The star-sign Cancer from The Book of Felicity, 1582

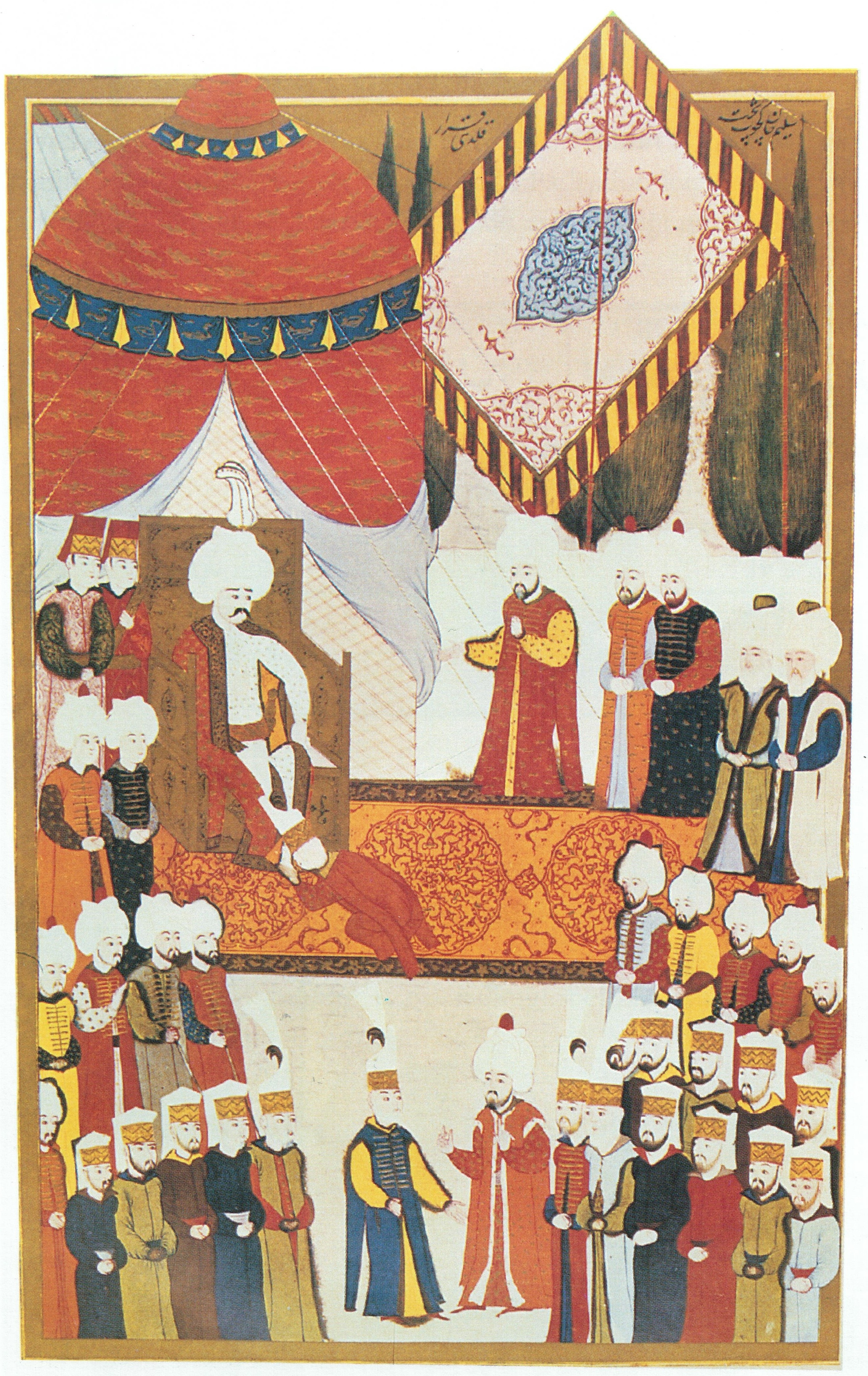
