= Zafername =

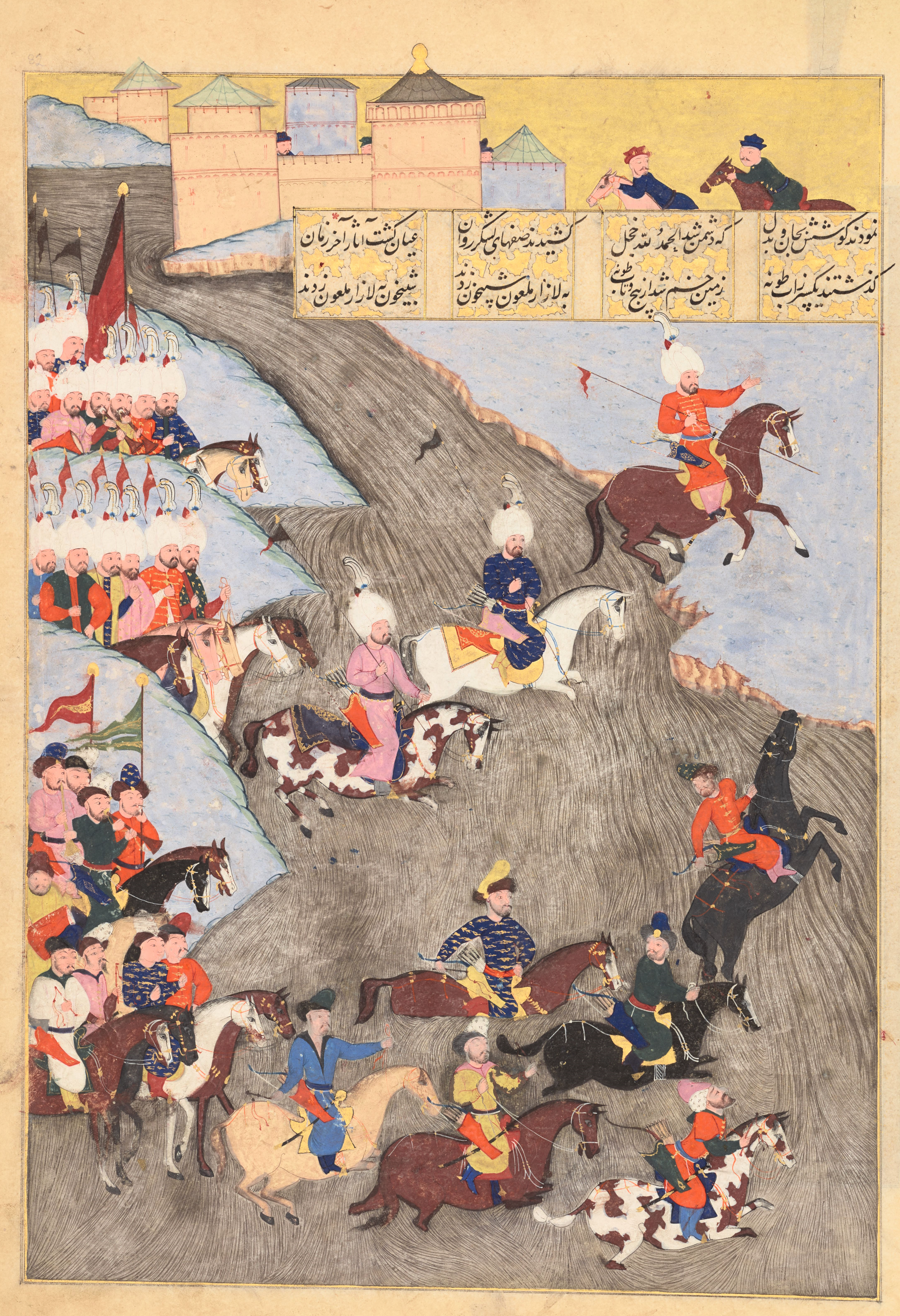
- Siege of Szigetvar in 1566
- Author: Seyyid Lokman
- Publication date: 1579

The Zafername ("Book of Victories") or Tarih-i Sultan Süleyman ("History of Sultan Süleyman"), from the Chester Beatty Library, Dublin (DCB No.413), is one of the most characteristic examples of Ottoman miniature art, produced in the second half of the 16th century during the last years of the reign of Suleiman I. The creator of the manuscript was Seyyid Lokman, court-appointed Sahnameci, with illustrations being made by various selected painters working in the imperial studio. The most significant painter was Nakkaş Osman, mostly active in 1570–90, who essentially defined Turkish miniature art during the classical period. These manuscripts were written in Persian and in verse.

Lokman created Sahnames, chronicles of contemporary historical events. The first major work by Lokman was the Zafername, completed in 1579.

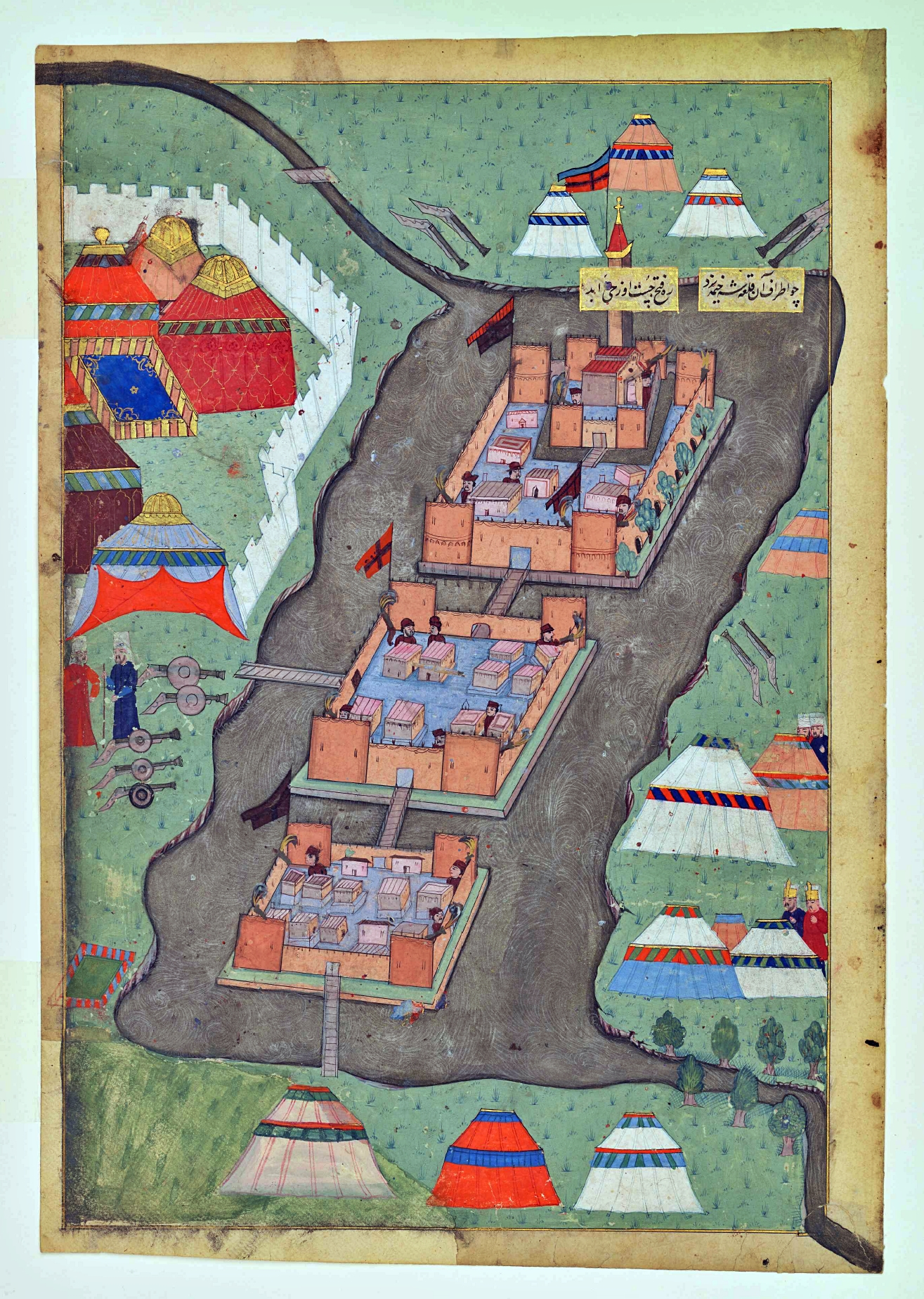
The fortress of Szigetvar in 1566

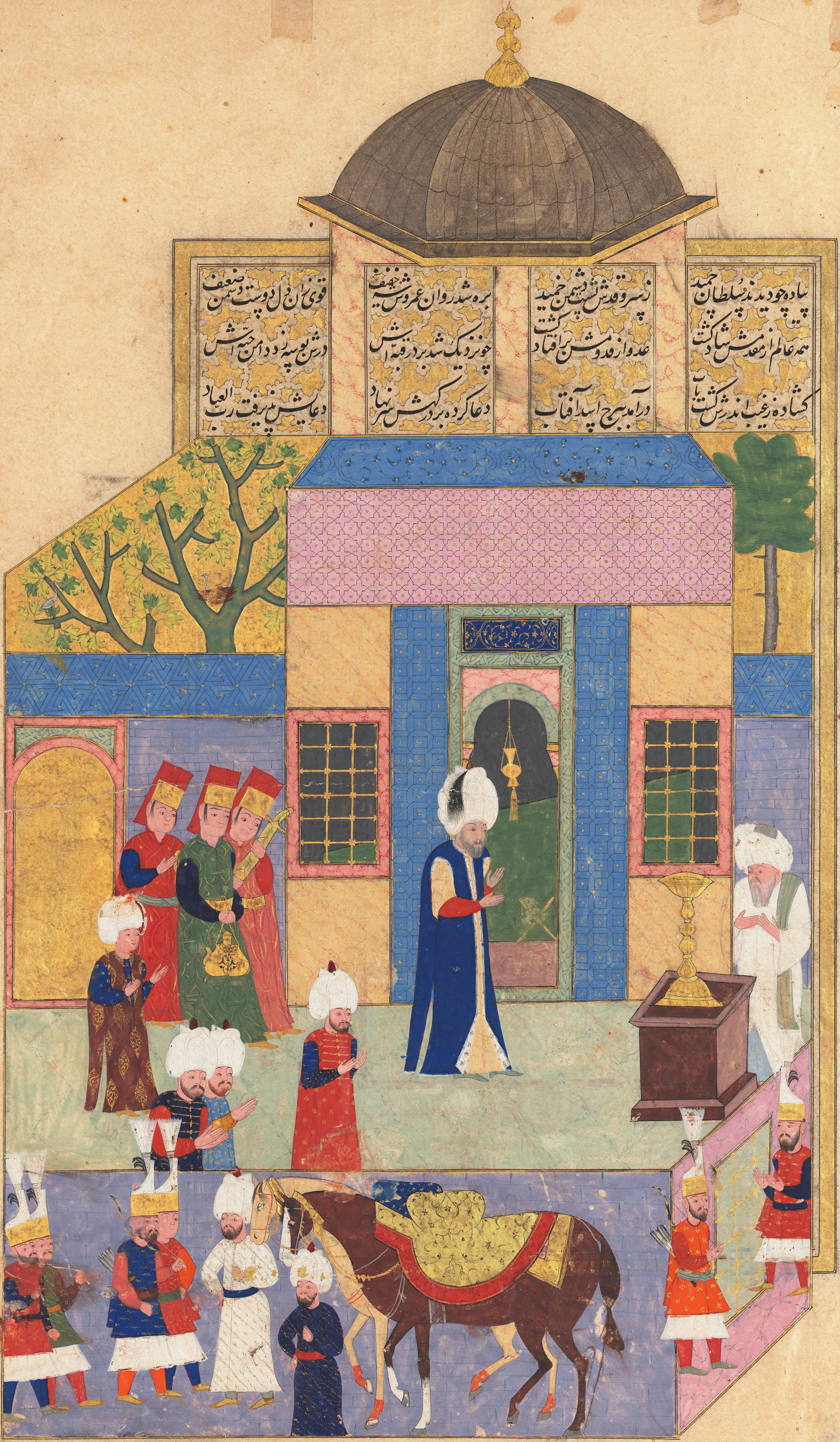
Süleyman's Pilgrimage to Eyüp

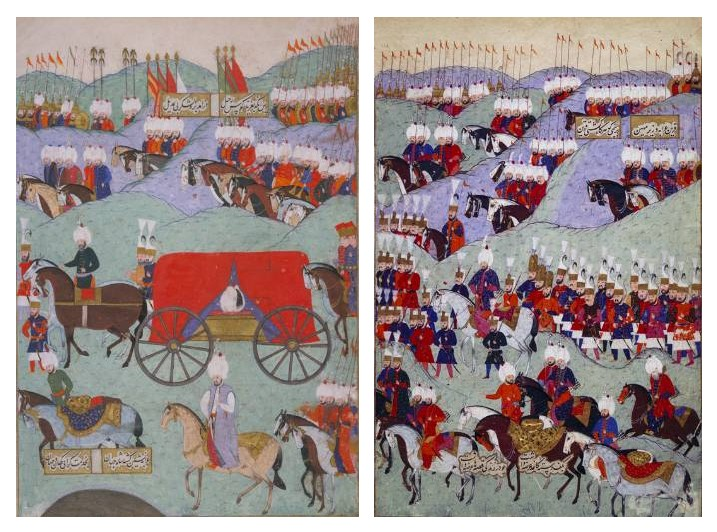
The Funerals of Sultan Suleyman the Magnificent. Zafername

== Sources ==
- Roxburgh, David J. (2005). Turks: a journey of a thousand years, 600-1600. London : New York: Royal Academy of Arts ; Distributed in the U.S. and Canada by Harry N. Abrams. p. 269. ISBN 978-1903973578.
