= Hünername =

16th-century Ottoman manuscript with illustrations

- Topkapı Palace, Istanbul, Hazine 1523–1524
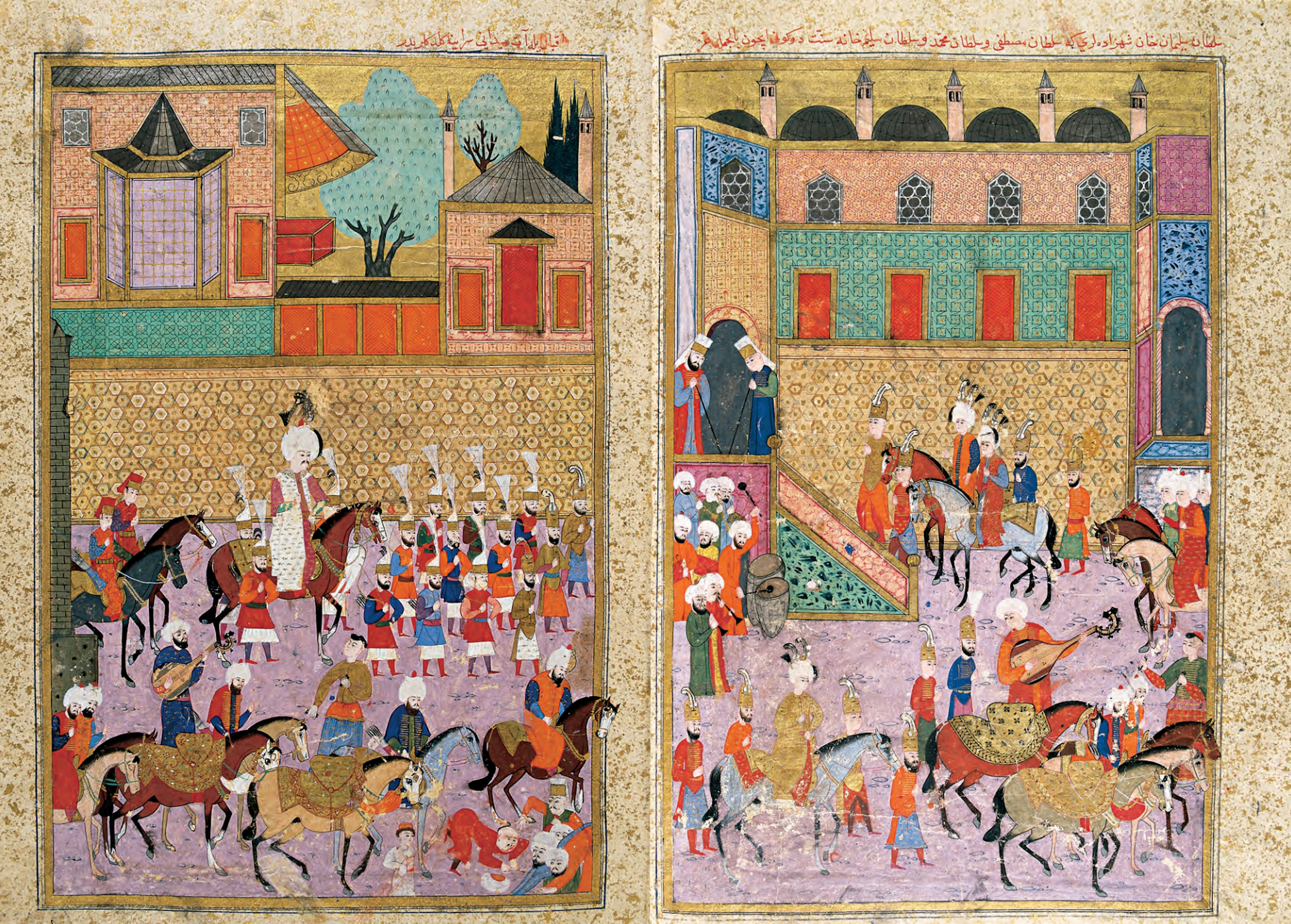
- Suleiman the Magnificent's arrival at the palace in Atmeydanı, for the circumcision ceremony of his princes Mustafa, Mehmed, and Selim (Hünernâme)
- Date: 1584–1588
- Illuminated by: Seyyid Lokman, Nakkach Osman
- Size: 37 × 25 cm (15 x 10 in)
- Contents: 2 vols.

The Hünername (Ottoman Turkish: هنرنامه "Book of Talents", TSMK H.1523-1524) is an illustrated manuscript completed in 1584–1588 at the Ottoman court and preserved since then in Topkapı Palace in Istanbul. It contains the history of the Sultans of the Ottoman Empire and particularly that of Suleiman the Magnificent. Bound in two volumes and illustrated with 89 double-page miniatures, it is one of the most famous Ottoman manuscripts.

== History ==
The writing of this history to the glory of the Ottoman sultans was started by the official historiographers Fethullah Arifi Çelebi (d. 1561/62), (Note: Arifi was the author also of the Süleymanname) and Shirvanli Eflatun (d. 1569/70). After an interruption of about ten years, corresponding to the period of the reign of Selim II, it was continued by their successor, Seyyid Lokman, who was put in charge of the official history by Murad III. He began writing it at the beginning of 1578, perhaps on the initiative of the Grand Vizier Sokollu Mehmed Pasha, of whom he was a protégé. Four volumes were planned but only two were produced, the last two to be devoted to the story of Selim II and Murad III. The drafting was completed in 1579–1580, but resumed a few years later. The illustration of the manuscript was executed by the imperial workshop then directed by Nakkaş Osman, and completed in 1584 for the first volume and in 1588 for the second.

After its completion, the manuscript was kept in the library of Topkapi Palace where it still remains.

== Description ==
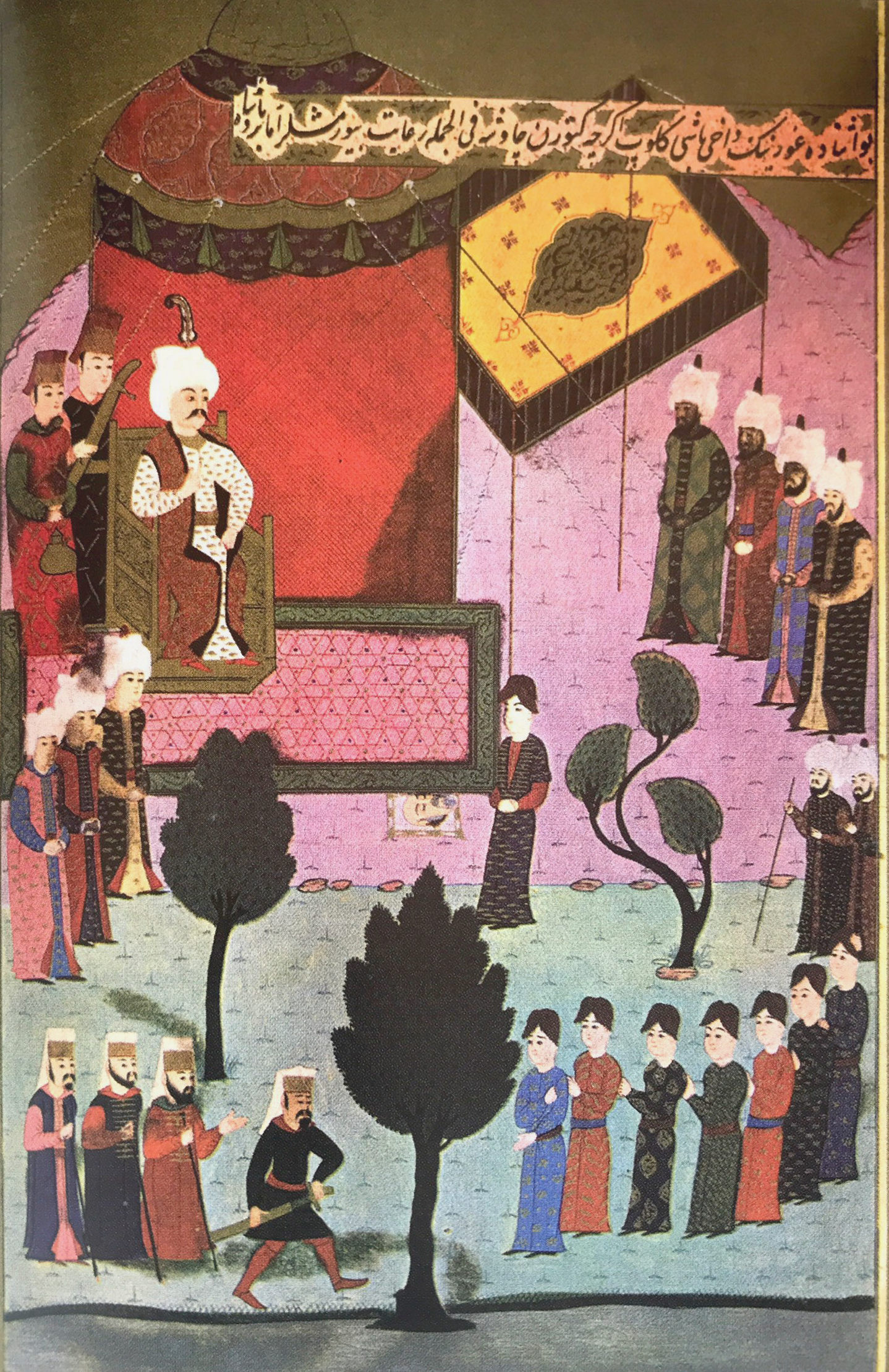
The severed head of Kansu Gavri is presented to Selim I. Hünername

The first volume is devoted to the first nine Ottoman sultans. It contains 37 miniatures including portraits of each monarch, as well as illustrated anecdotes about their courage and intelligence. The book begins with the representation of Topkapi Palace and its various courtyards.

The second volume is specifically devoted to the history of the reign of Suleiman the Magnificent. It contains 52 miniatures illustrating the qualities of the sovereign, in hunting and war, but also his generosity and his piety. The text is not written as a story but as a description of the qualities of a perfect man and his closeness to the Prophet. The illustrations also emphasize the role of Sokollu Mehmed Pasha, who was both grand vizier of Suleiman and Mourad III.

== See also ==
- Ottoman miniature

== Sources ==
- Ertuğ, Zeynep Tarim (1998). "Hünernâme". İslâm Ansiklopedisi. Vol. 18 (online ed.). Türkiye Diyanet Vakfı. pp. 484–5.
- Fetvacı, Emine (2013). Picturing History at the Ottoman Court. Bloomington, IN: Indiana University Press. pp. 132–7. ISBN 9780253006783.
- Taner, Melis (28 August 2020). "Contextualizing the Hünername (Book of Talents)". Khamseen: Islamic Art History Online.
