= Günsel Renda =

Günsel Renda is a Turkish art historian and a specialist in the history of Ottoman art, especially Ottoman painting and the interactions of European and Ottoman culture. A graduate of the Department of Art History of Columbia University and Washington University in St. Louis, she was the head of the Department of Art History at the Hacettepe University between 1965 and 2004. She was an adviser to the Turkish Ministry of Culture and Tourism from 1993 to 1996 and later president. She is currently an adjunct professor in the Archaeology and History of Art Department at Koç University and resident scholar of the Turkish Cultural Foundation.

Renda is the author or co-author of over 30 books, including Wall Paintings in Turkish Houses (1978), The Transformation of Culture. The Atatürk Legacy (1986), A History of Turkish Painting (1988), Representations of Towns in Ottoman Sea Charts of the 16th Century and Their Relations to Mediterranean Cartography (1990), Woman in Anatolia. 9000 Years of the Anatolian Woman (1993), Padişahın Portresi / The Sultan’s Portrait. Picturing the House of Osman (2000), Osmanlı Uygarlığı / Ottoman Civilization (2002), An Eye Witness of the Tulip Era. Jean Baptiste Vanmour (2003), Image of the Turks in the 17th Century Europe (2005), İmparatorluktan portreler / Portraits from the Empire (2005). and Osmanlı Resim Sanatı (2006), most of which are collaborations.

Amongst her work, she has analyzed the strategic use made of his portraits by Sultan Mahmut II (1808–39), which he would often give to foreign embassies as a gesture of good will.
