= Şehzade Mustafa (son of Mehmed II) =

Ottoman prince, son of Mehmed II and Gülşah Hatun

- Born: c. 1450; Manisa Palace, Manisa, Ottoman Empire
- Died: 25 December 1474 (aged 23–24); Bor, Niğde, Ottoman Empire
- Burial: Muradiye Complex, Bursa
- Issue: Şehzade Halil; Nergisşah Ferahşad Hatun; Hani Hatun
- Dynasty: Ottoman
- Father: Mehmed II
- Mother: Gülşah Hatun
- Religion: Sunni Islam

Şehzade Mustafa (Ottoman Turkish: شهزاده مصطفى; c. 1450 – 25 December 1474) was an Ottoman prince, son of Sultan Mehmed the Conqueror and his concubine Gülşah Hatun.

== Life ==
Şehzade Mustafa was born in 1450 in Manisa. His father was Şehzade Mehmed (later Mehmed II) and his mother was Gülşah Hatun. There are claims that she was either a daughter of İbrahim Bey of the Karamanids or a concubine. Mustafa was well-educated, trained in swordsmanship and was a musketeer.

In 1451, following the death of his grandfather Sultan Murad II, his father became the Sultan. Mustafa was his father's most beloved son. According to Ottoman tradition, all princes were expected to work as provincial governors as a part of their training. In 1457, after the circumcision ceremony was held in Edirne together with his elder brother Bayezid, he was sent to Manisa for his first sanjak appointment. In 1467, he was appointed governor of Konya and Kayseri

In 1473, Mustafa along with his forces and alongside his father and half-brother Şehzade Bayezid took part in the Battle of Otlukbeli against Uzun Hasan, the ruler of the Turkic ruling dynasty Aq Qoyunlu, the battle was also dubbed as the "Battle of the Princes", as it was fought between Şehzade Mustafa, Şehzade Bayezid against Aq Qoyunlu prince Ughurlu Muhammad, who would later become the husband of Gevherhan Hatun, Mustafa's half-sister and Bayezid's full sister.

In 1474, after the abolition of the Karamanid dynasty, Mustafa became the governor of Karaman. He was described as a tall, handsome and flirtatious man, who was said to have numerous consorts in his harem, but only had three surviving children, a son, Şehzade Halil, and two daughters, Hani Hatun and Nergisşah (or Nergiszade) Ferahşad Hatun.

== Illness and Death ==
After returning victorious from the battle, Mustafa fell ill. The prince was also fond of hunting and drinking, moreover his illness worsened during the twelve-day campaign in Karahisar. His father was informed about his illness, and he dispatched his personal physician Yakup Pasha and also an army under the command of Gedik Ahmed Pasha.

In last 1474, due the worsening of the illness, the prince was then transferred to Bor, Niğde, where the prince was given a hot bath to be cured of his illness but right after the bath, the prince passed away at the age of twenty four. His body was taken back to Bursa and was buried in his tomb in the Muradiye Complex. The death of Mustafa devastated his father Mehmed, Mustafa was his most beloved son and likely heir, upon the death news, the sultan reportedly lay bare on the stone floor for three days and three nights lamenting and wailing and only afterwards public mourning was announced. Şehzade's death is recorded in the historical chronicle, Khonkar-nama.

=== Aftermath ===
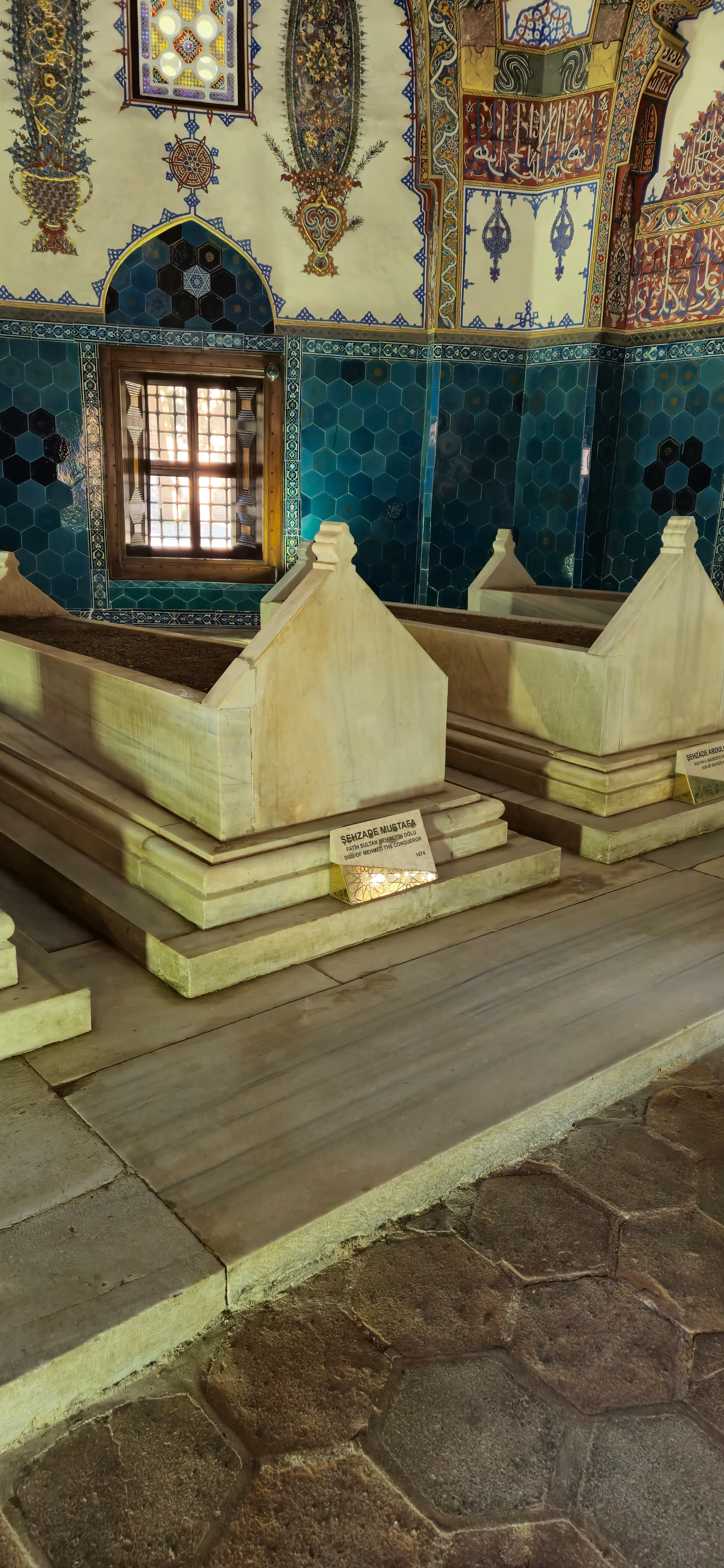
Şehzade Mustafa's sarcophagus

However, Mustafa's sudden illness and death caused wide speculation regarding the prince being poisoned by the grand vizier Mahmud Pasha. Historians have speculated that Mustafa took, the pasha's second wife as his lover and the pasha poisoned the prince in retaliation.

Moreover, his mother Gülşah may have been a party to the illicit relations between the prince and Selçuk Hatun. Furthermore, it was said that Mahmud Pasha had given the prince a poisoned pear during the Battle of Otlukbeli. However, Giovanni Maria Angiolello, a Venetian traveler, author of an important historical report on the Aq Qoyunlu and early Safavid Persia, who was in the service of Mustafa, and who with the rest of Mustafa's household accompanied the prince's cortege from his post his Kayseri to Bursa, where he was buried, denied any role for Mahmud Pasha in Mustafa's death. Nevertheless, Mahmud Pasha was executed shortly afterwards. It was also said that the poisoned used to poison him was Atropa bella-donna, it has been used for centuries as an alternative to several illnesses and diseases, it was widely speculated that Mustafa was fed this poison in the battle and after the battle which ultimately led to his death. According to historian Halil İnalcık, Şehzade Mustafa died as a result of excessive drinking and a life of excess.

His father outlived him by seven years and died in 1481, and his mother outlived him by thirteen years and died in 1487, and was buried near him in her own mausoleum.

== Issue ==
Mustafa had two daughters:

- Nergisşah (or Nergiszade) Ferahşad Hatun (born around 1467). In 1480 she married her cousin Şehzade Abdullah and had a son and two daughters:
  - Şehzade Fülan (1481-1489).
  - Aynışah Sultan (1482 - 1540), she married Ahmed Pasha. Buried in her grandmother Şirin Hatun's mausoleum, Bursa, with her mother.
  - Şahnisa Sultan (1484 - 1540), she married firstly her cousin Şehzade Mehmed Şah (died in 1512, son of Şehzade Şehinşah); secondly Mirza Mehmed Pasha (died in 1517, before married with Şahnisa's aunt Fatma Sultan) and had a son, Sultanzade Şemsi Ahmed Pasha; eventually she married Nuri Bey;
- Hani Hatun (c. 1468- 1530).

== Bibliography ==
- Babinger, Franz (1992). Mehmed the Conqueror and His Time. Princeton University Press. ISBN 978-0-691-01078-6.
- Peirce, Leslie P. (1993). The Imperial Harem: Women and Sovereignty in the Ottoman Empire. Oxford University Press. ISBN 978-0-195-08677-5.
- Stavrides, Théoharis (2001). The Sultan of Vezirs: The Life and Times of the Ottoman Grand Vezir Mahmud Pasha Angelović (1453-1474). BRILL. ISBN 978-9-004-12106-5.
- Yıldız, Sara Nur (2004). "Persian in the Service of the Sultan: Historical Writing in Persian under the Ottomans during the 15th and 16th Centuries". In Arjomand, Saïd Amir (ed.). Studies on Persianate Societies. Vol. 2. Brill. pp. 145–166. ISBN 978-90-04-73272-8.
- Tirmikçioğlu, Zeynep (2020). Father, Son and the Poison: A Reevaluation of the Deaths of Fatih Sultan Mehmed and his sons Şehzade Mustafa, Cem Sultan and Bayezid II in the Light of Fifteenth Century Poisons.
