= Muradiye Complex =

Mausoleums of Ottoman royalty

- Muradiye Külliyesi
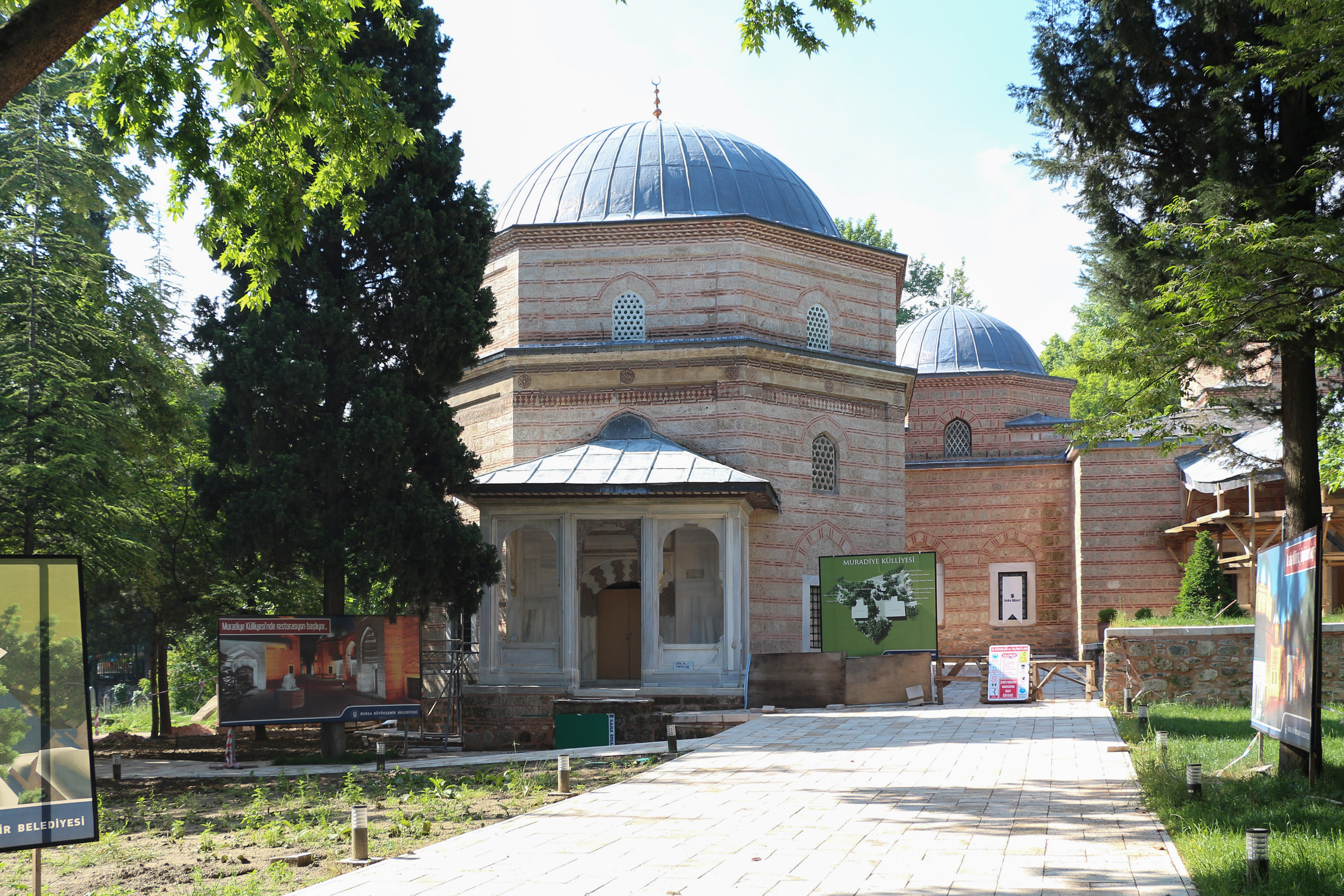

- Location of the Muradiye Complex in Turkey.

Religion
- Affiliation: Islam

Location
- Location: Bursa, Turkey
- Coordinates: 40.190853°N 29.046144°E

Architecture
- Type: Mosque
- Style: Islamic, Ottoman architecture
- Completed: 1426; 600 years ago
- Minaret: 2
- Location within Turkey

UNESCO World Heritage Site
- Part of: Bursa and Cumalıkızık: the Birth of the Ottoman Empire
- Criteria: Cultural: (i), (ii), (iv), (vi)
- Reference: 1452-007
- Inscription: 2014 (38th Session)

The Muradiye Complex (Turkish: Muradiye Külliyesi) or the Complex of Sultan Murad II, the Ottoman sultan (reigned 1421–1451, with interruption 1444–46), is located in Bursa, Turkey. It is part of the historic UNESCO World Heritage Site.

== History ==
The mosque complex commissioned by Sultan Murad II in Bursa contains twelve tombs (türbe), most belonging to relatives of this sultan. Construction of the complex began after the completion of the Yeşil Mosque, which is in the eastern area of Bursa. A large earthquake in 1855 damaged much of the Muradiye complex, and restorations were completed in the late nineteenth century. A further restoration project was completed in 2015.

Interior view.

The large complex is composed of the Muradiye Mosque, Muradiye Madrasa, Muradiye Bath, Muradiye Hospice, a fountain, epitaphs, and numerous tombs, among others: Sultan Murad II's tomb, Şehzade Ahmed's tomb, Cem Sultan's tomb, Şehzade Mustafa's tomb, Mahidevran Hatun's tomb, Gülşah Hatun's tomb, Hüma Hatun's tomb, Sittişah Hatun's tomb, the Saraylilar's tomb, and Şirin Hatun's tomb.

The Mosque was the first project in the complex, completed in 1426. The mosque is built in a simplified inverse T plan with a domed portico in front, constructed of brick and with four major domes. Hexagonal tiles in turquoise and dark blue decorate the interior. There are two minarets, one that is old and one that is new due to collapse from the 19th century earthquake and was rebuilt in 1904. A fire damaged the mosque in the early 18th century, and so the mihrab was also rebuilt, in the rococo style.

The madrasa is located to the west of the mosque. It is composed of a central courtyard surrounded by student rooms and a classroom to the back, covered by a dome. The exterior is brick and stone. The madrasa itself does not have a construction inscription due to numerous restorations. The inscription on the mosque says the madrasa was also constructed in 1426 by Murad II. Dark blue and turquoise tiles decorate the interior, while brick decorates the exterior entrance.

Sources conflict on the date of construction for the tomb of Murad II, either before his death in 1451, or after commissioned by his son Mehmed II in accordance with Murad II's will. The building is constructed of brick and stone, in a square plan topped with a dome that is left open at the top. A vaulted gallery surrounds the dome, resting on Byzantine capitals. A large impressive wooden canopy over the entrance is carved in relief and embellished in star patterns. An annex contains four additional tombs, identified as those of Aladdin Ali (whom the annex is named after, “Mausoleum of Alaaddin”), Şehzade Ahmet, Orhan and Şehzade Hatun.

The remaining eleven tombs belong to the rest of the sultan's family to the south of the mosque and the madrasa. They are decorated with polychrome glazed tiles mostly in blue, except for the tombs of Şehzade Mustafa and Mahidevran Hatun which is decorated in painted Iznik tiles from the 16th century in the polychrome technique.

In the 1950s the madrasa became a tuberculosis clinic and it now houses a medical centre.

== Gallery ==
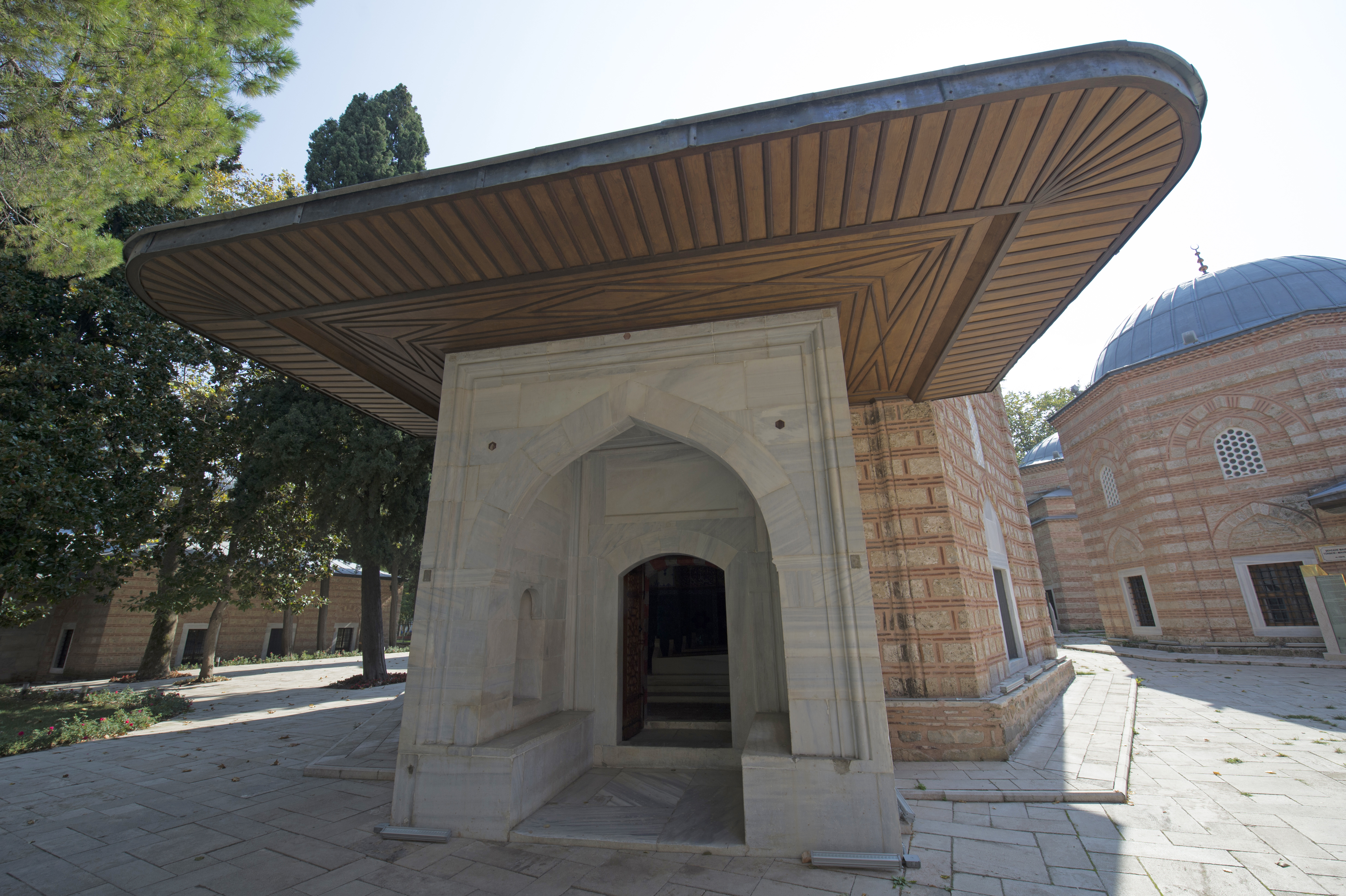
Front of Cem Sultan tomb

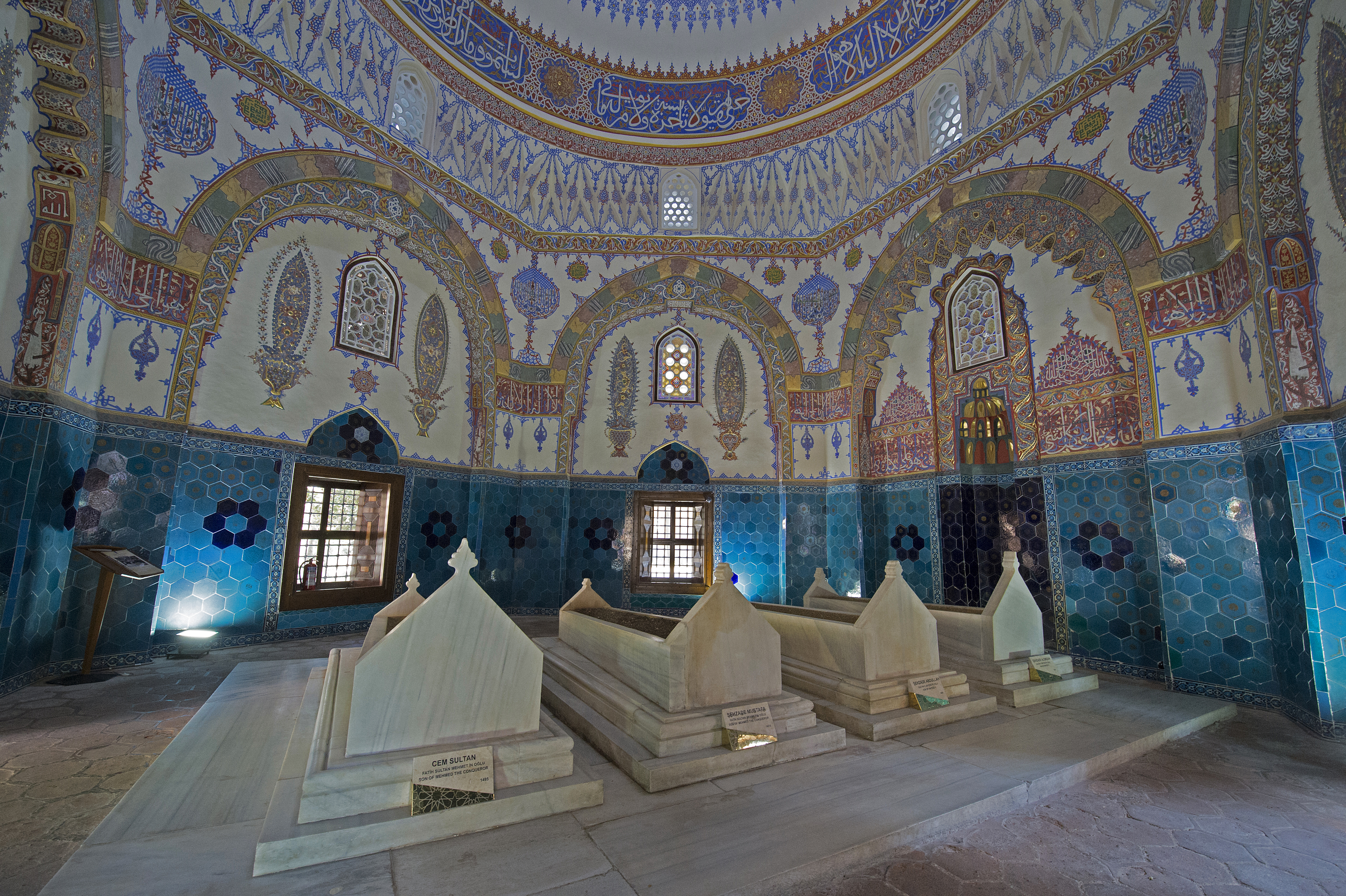
Interior Cem Sultan tomb

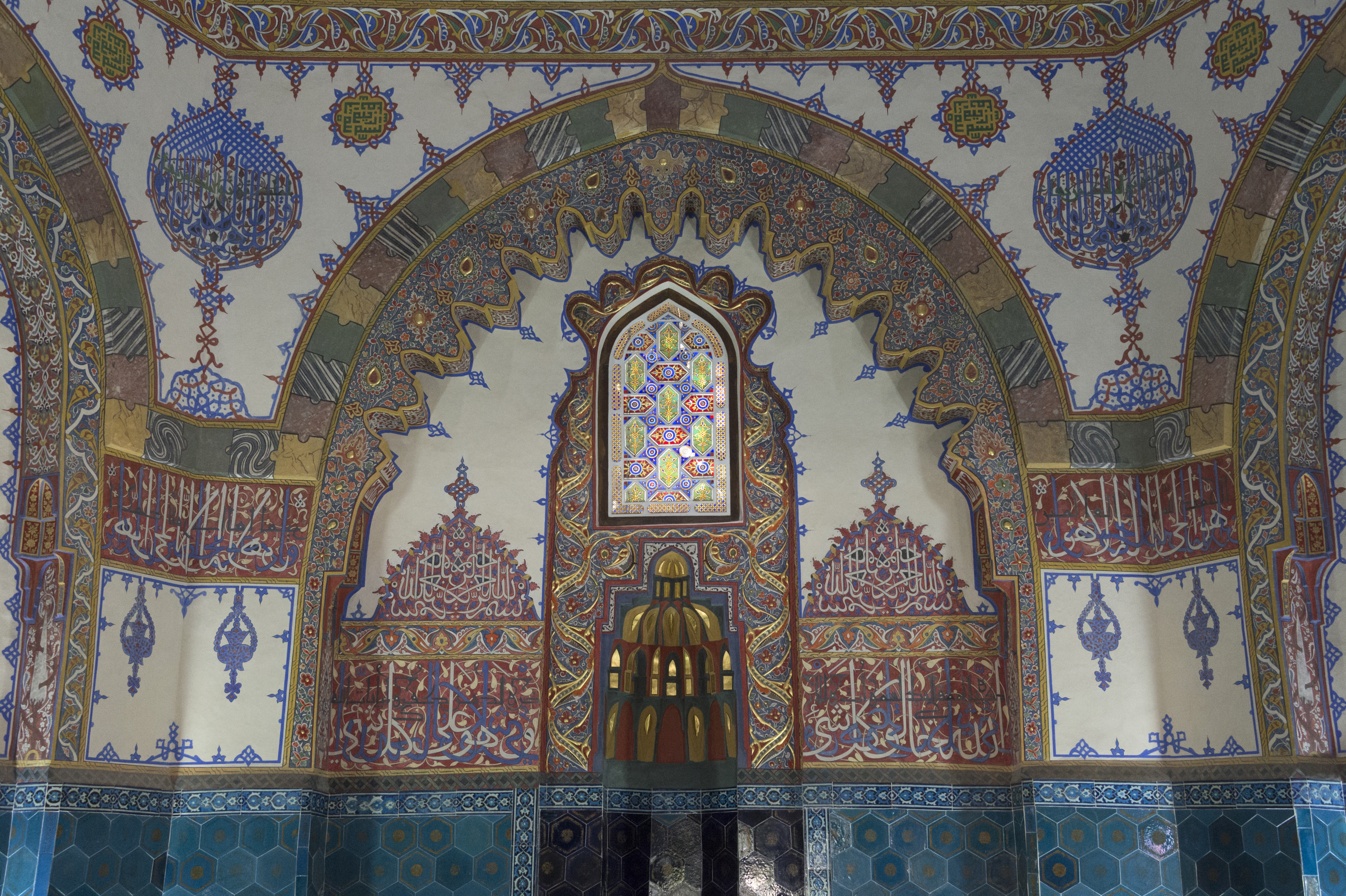
Interior Cem Sultan tomb

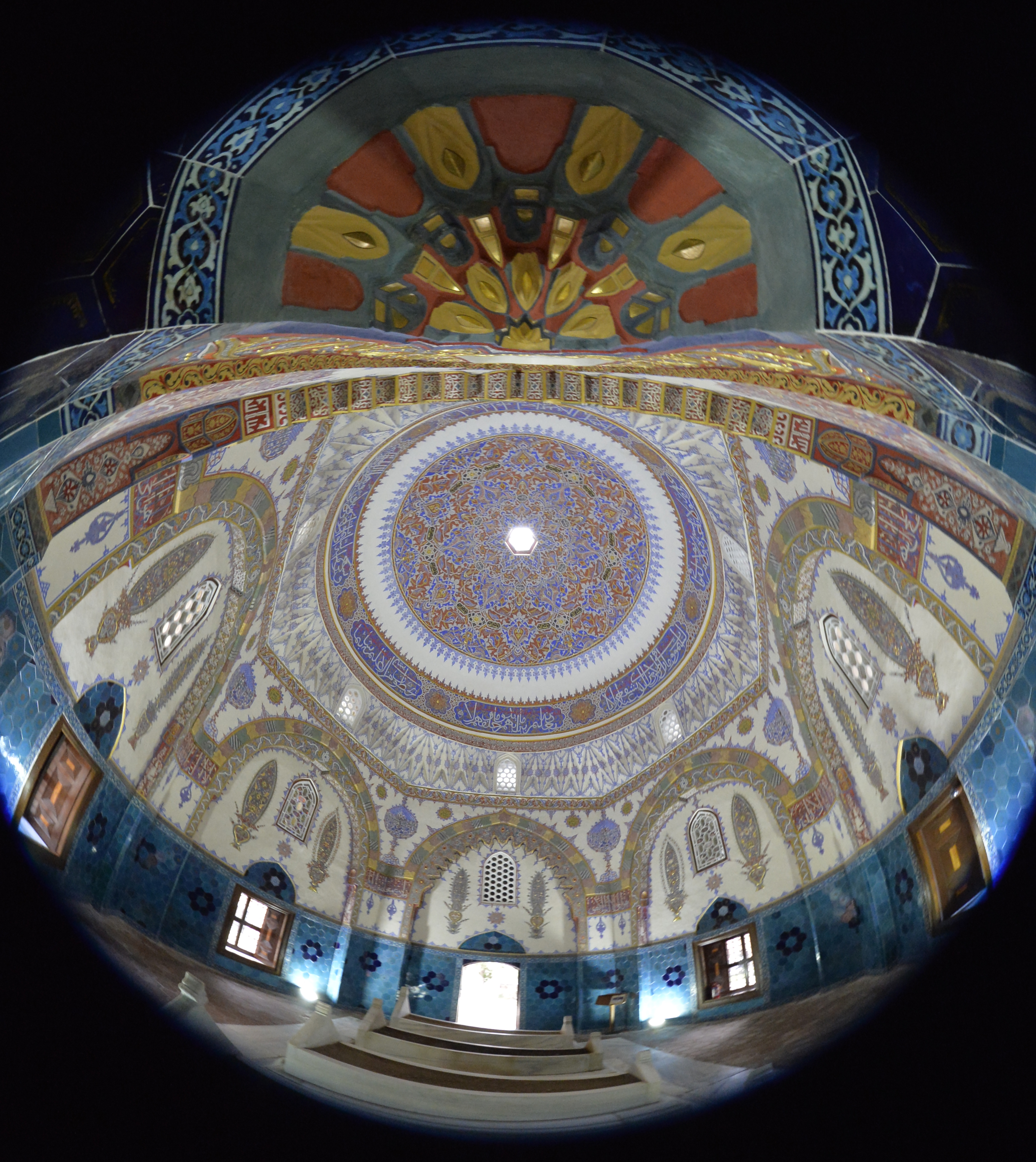
Interior Cem Sultan tomb

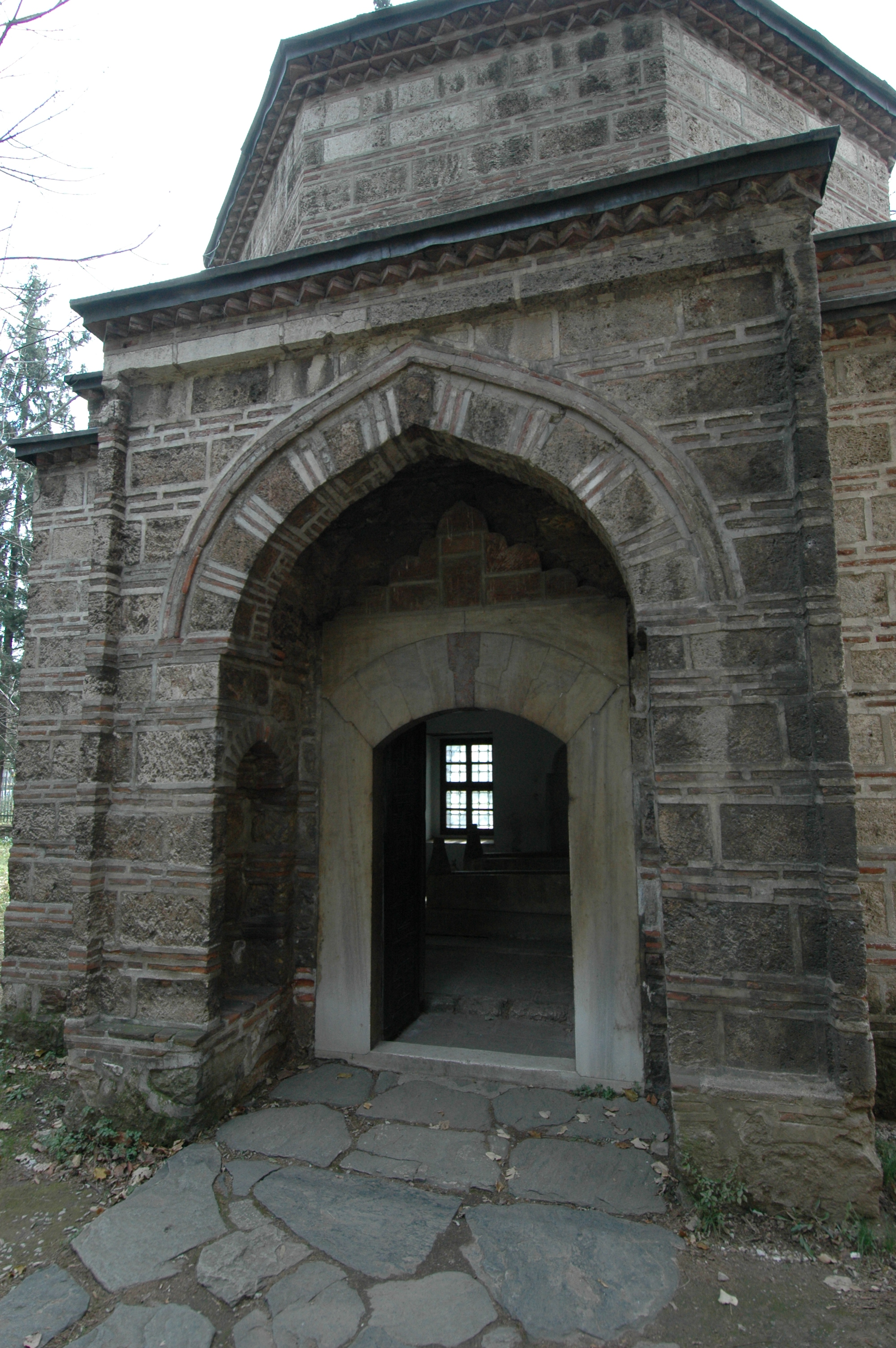
Entrance to Gülşah Hatun tomb

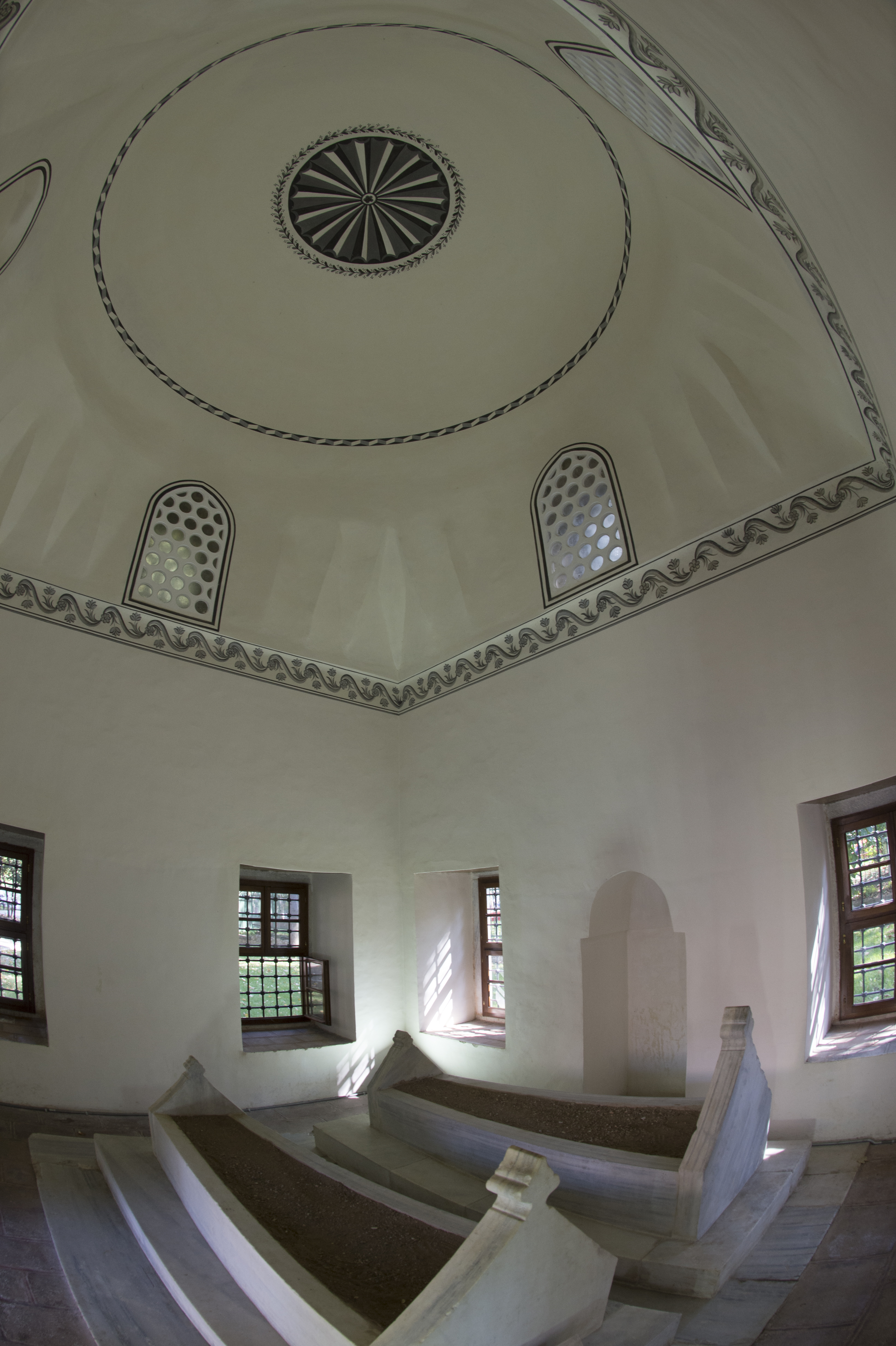
Interior Gülşah Hatun tomb

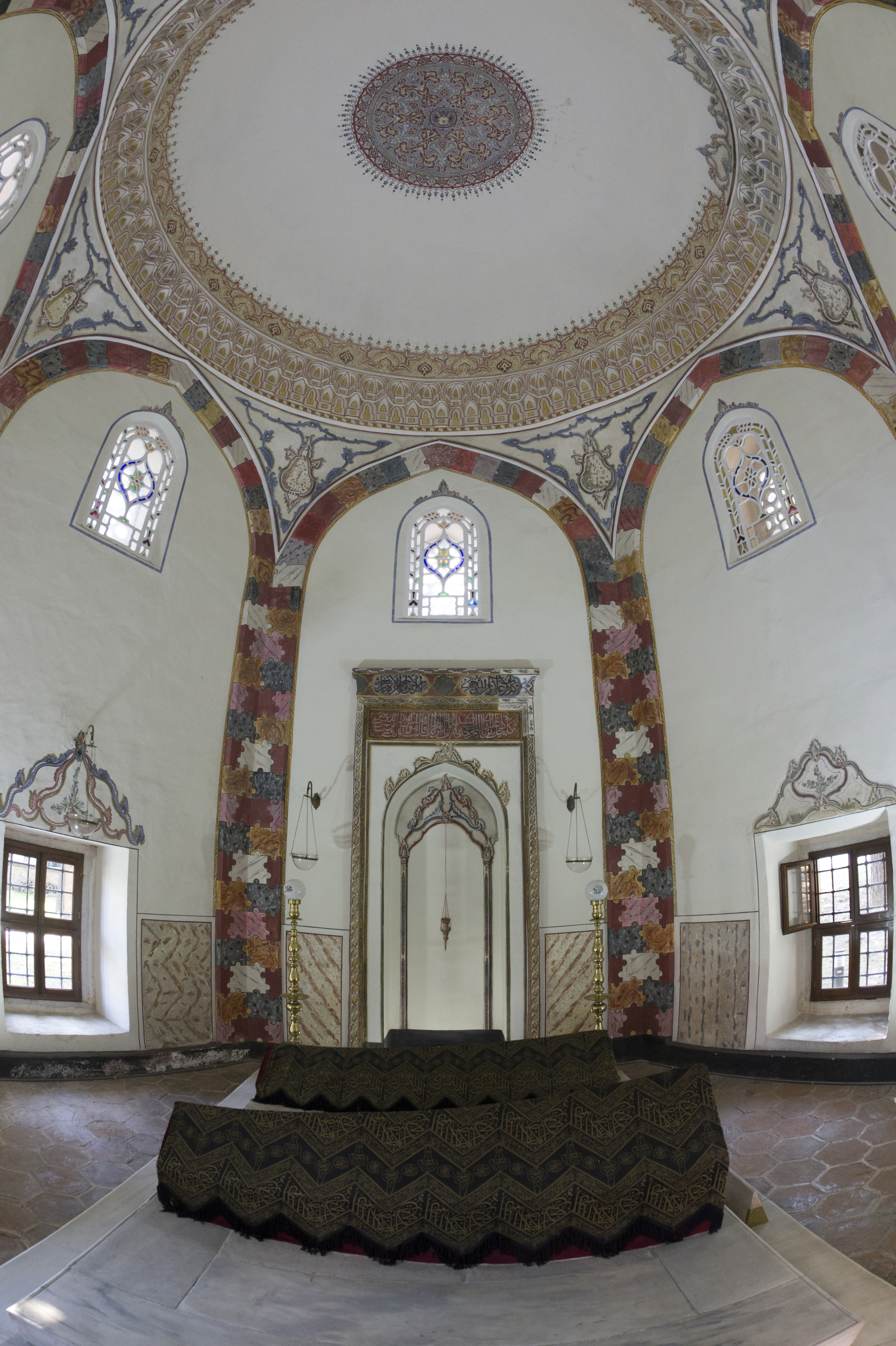
Hüma Hatun tomb interior

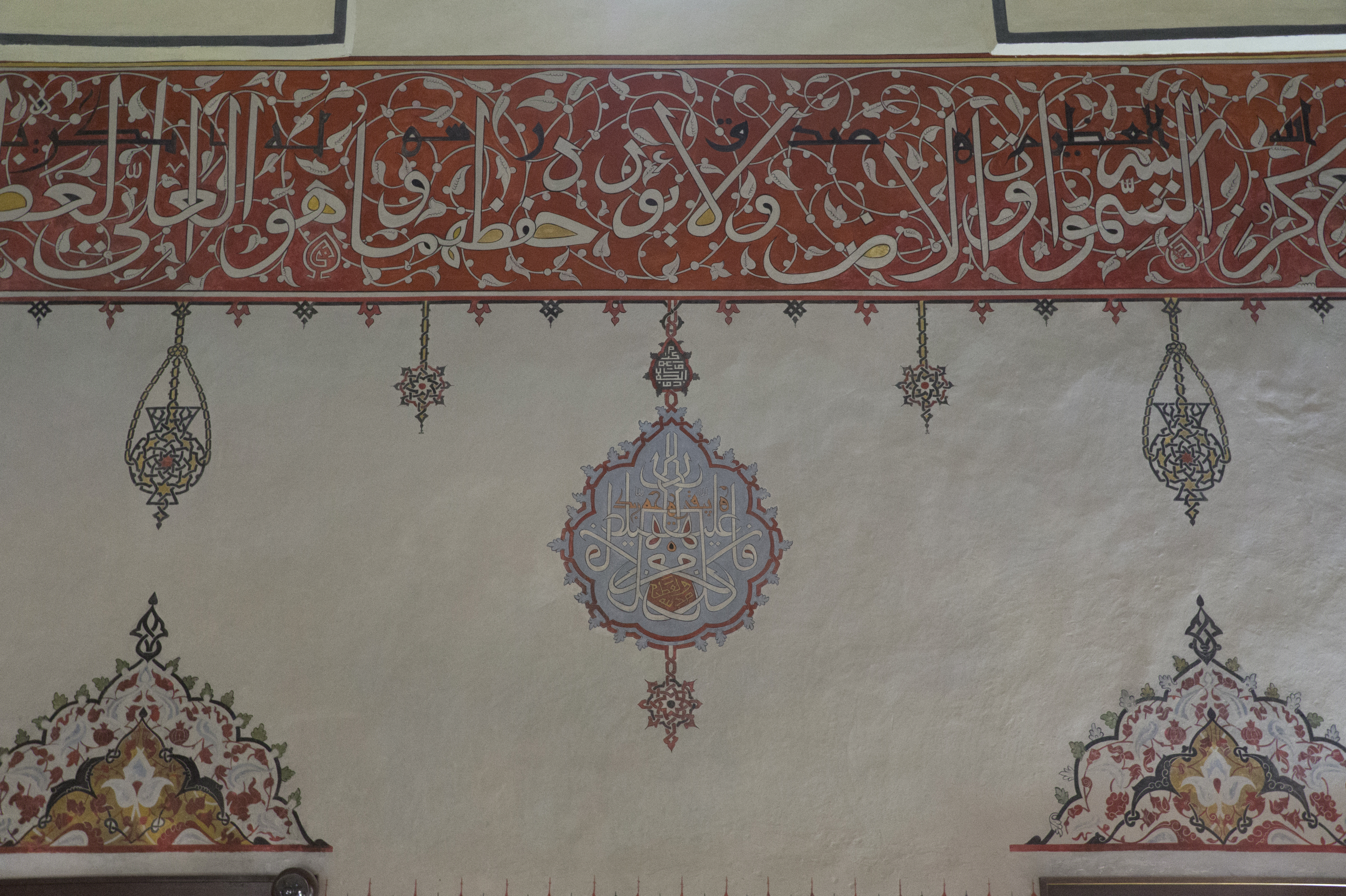
Hüma Hatun tomb decoration

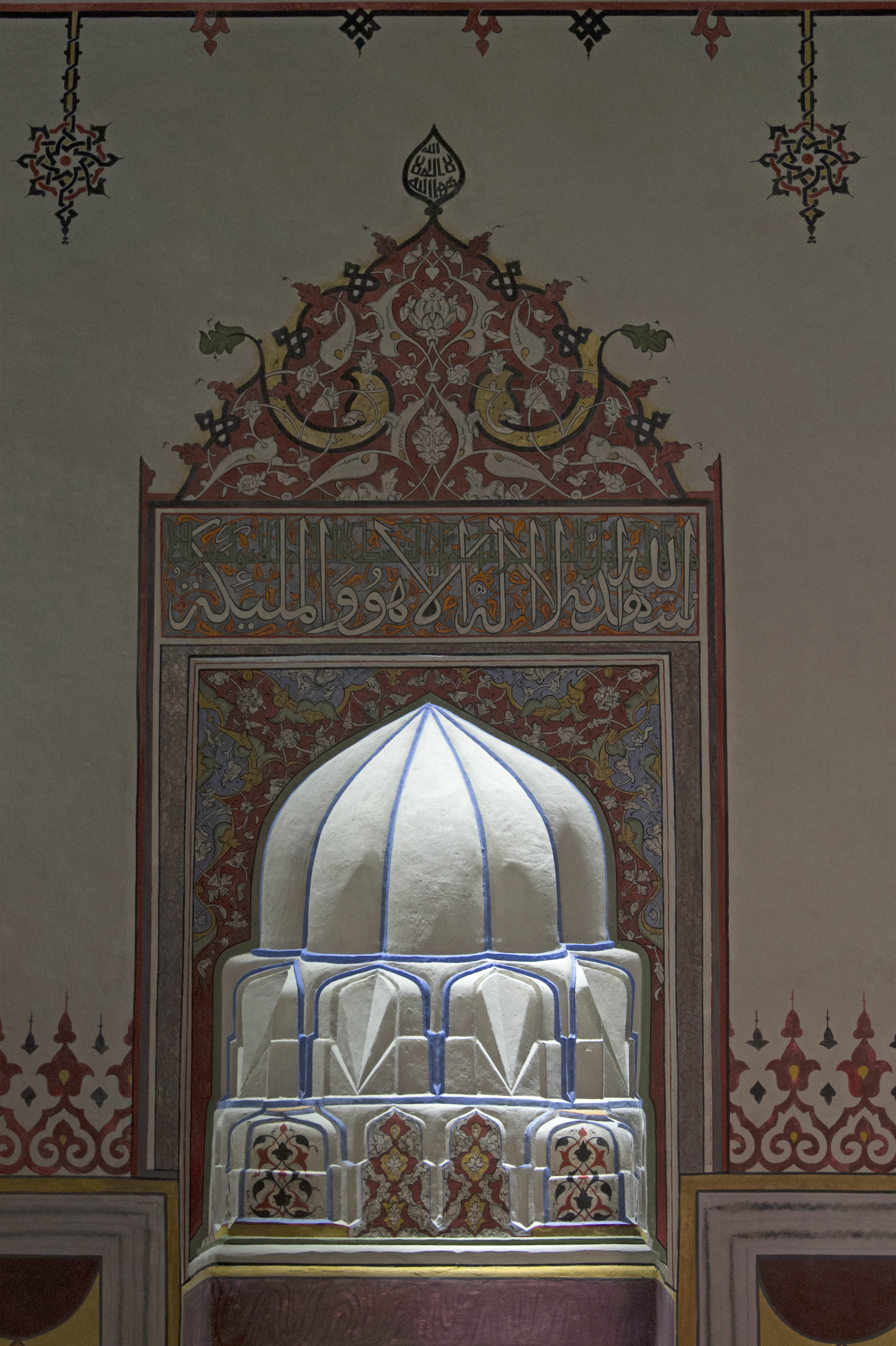
Mükrime Hatun tomb top side mihrab

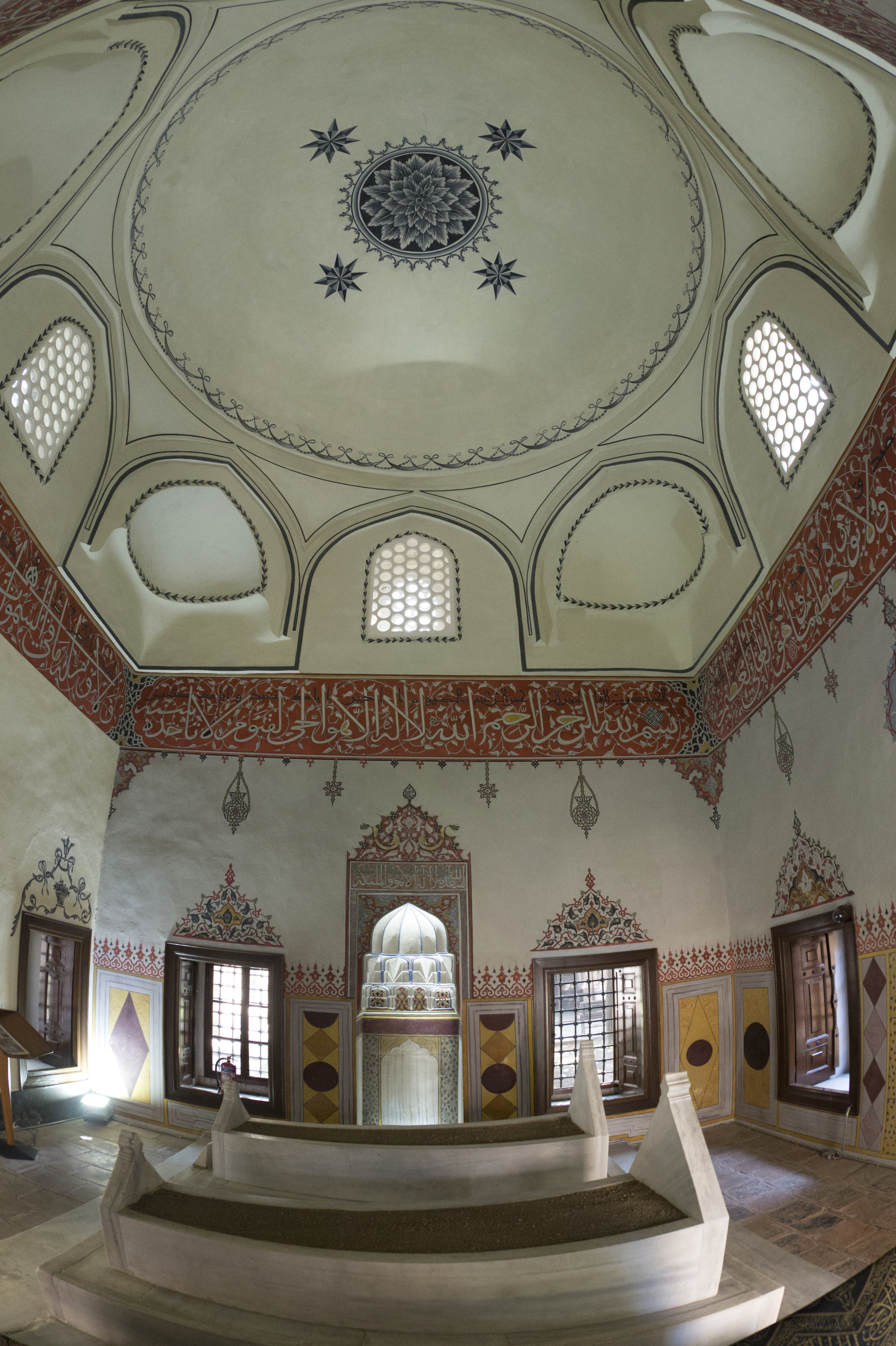
Mükrime Hatun tomb interior

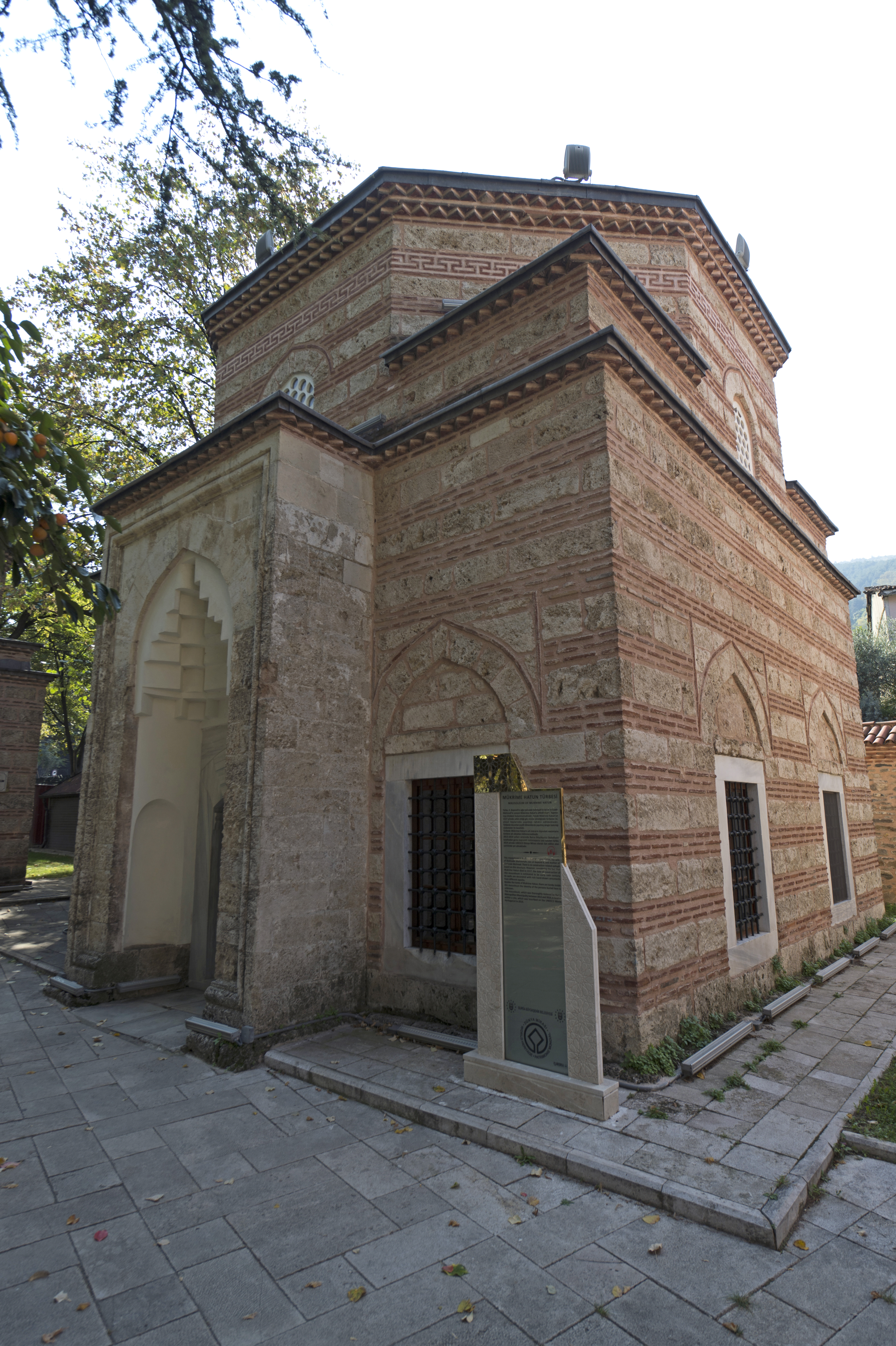
Mükrime Hatun tomb exterior

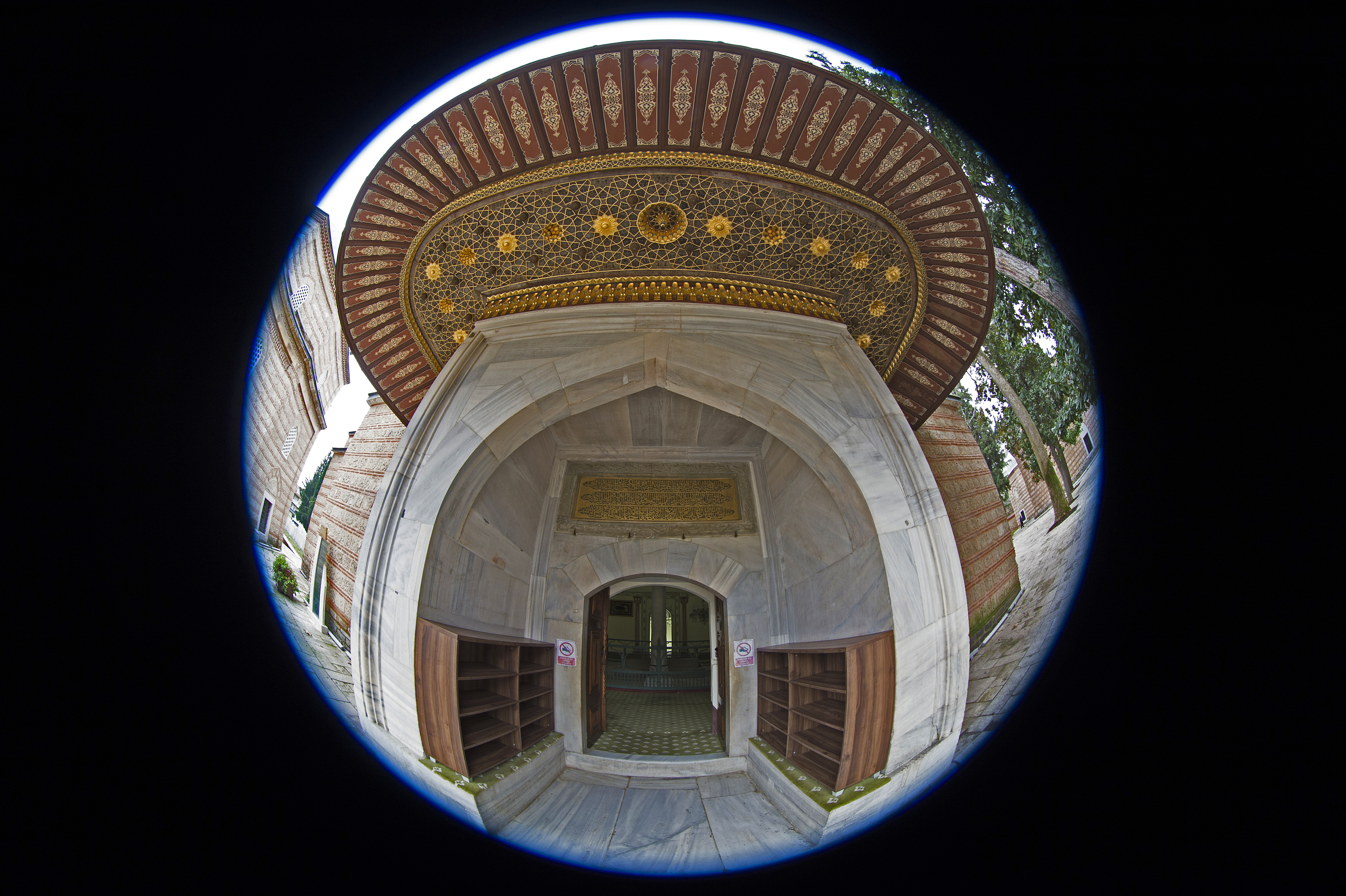
Entrance Murad II tomb

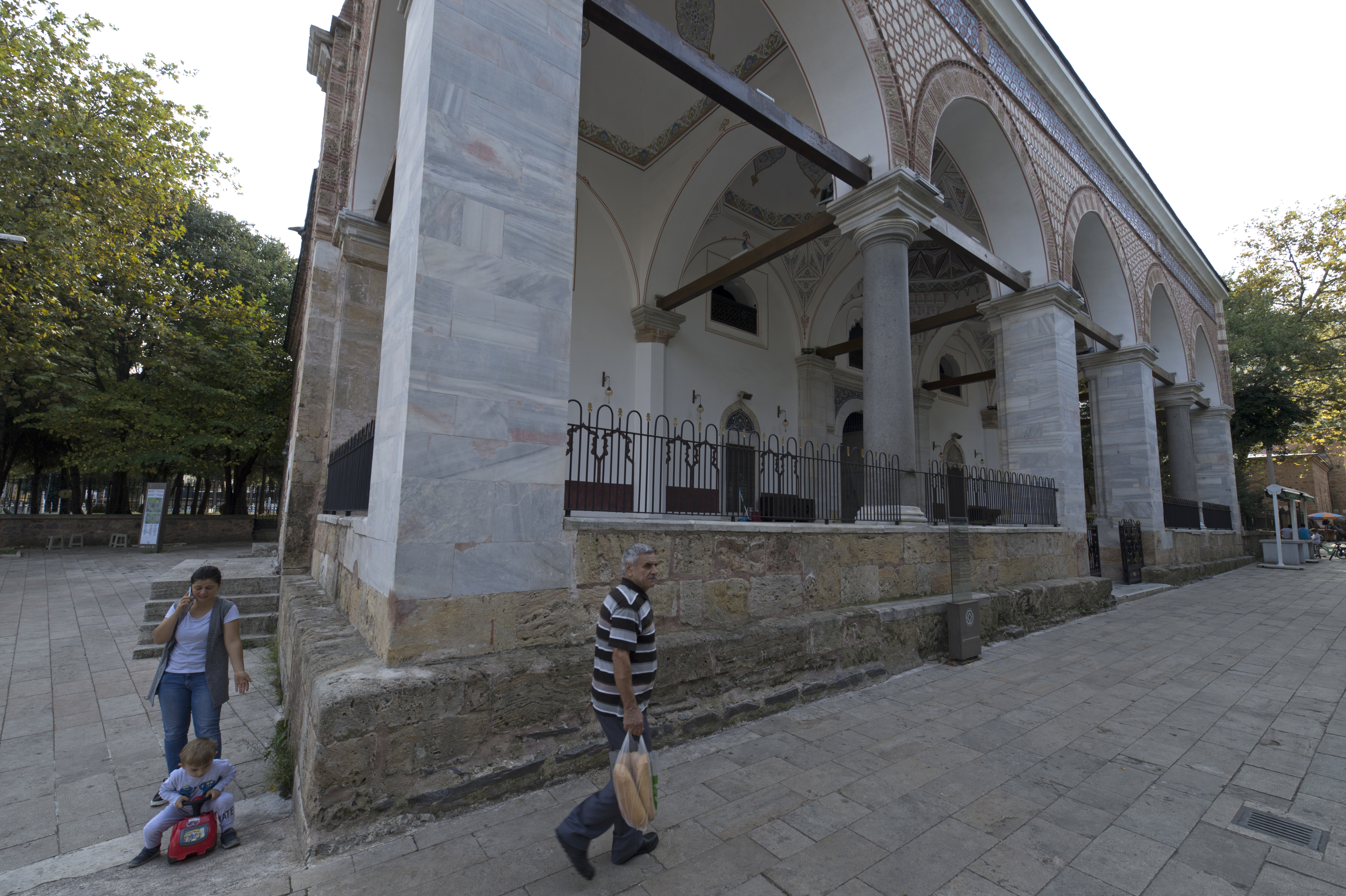
Muradiye Mosque exterior

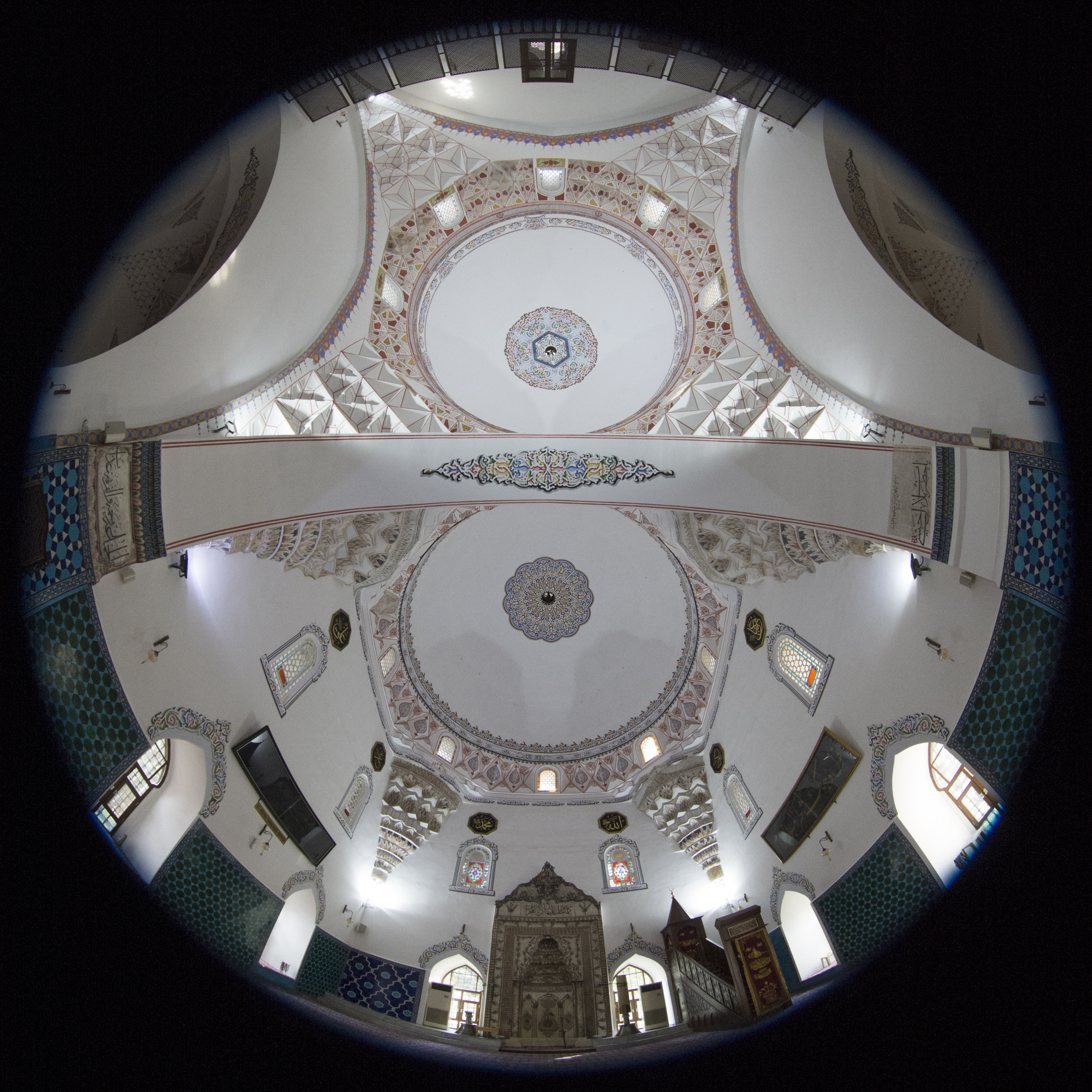
Muradiye Mosque interior

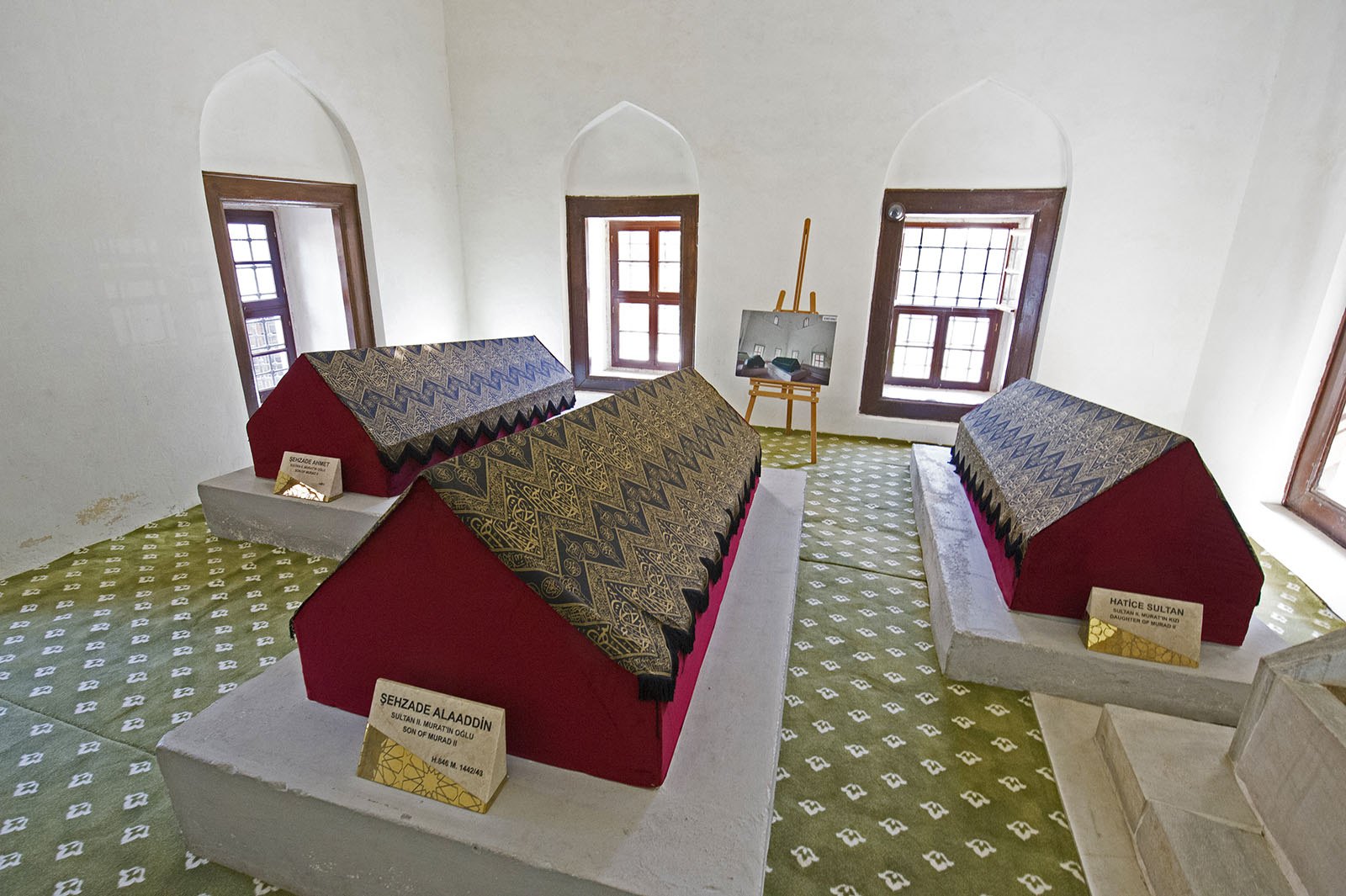
Mausoleum Sultan Alaaddin c.s. at Murad II tomb

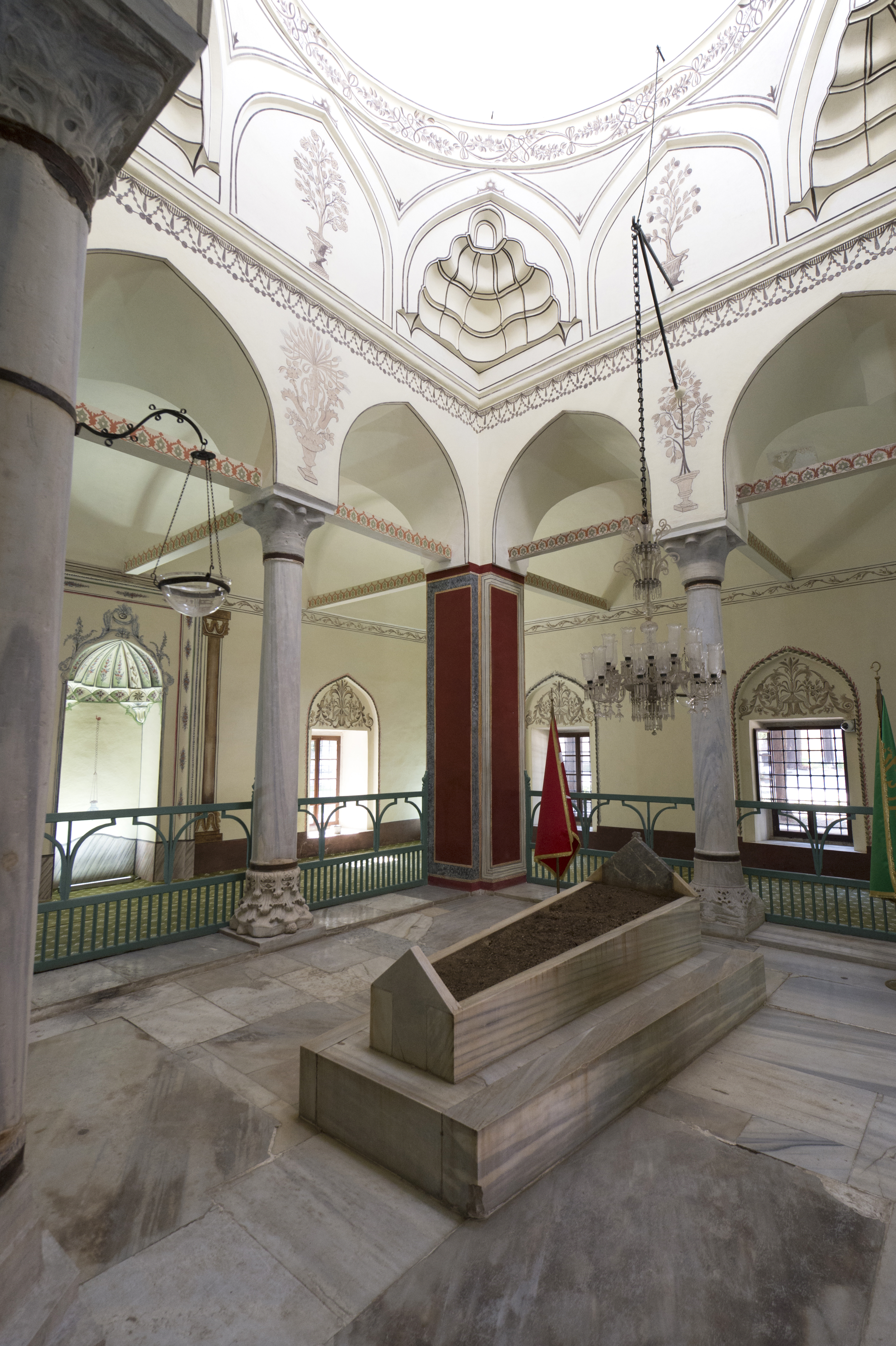
The grave of Murad II

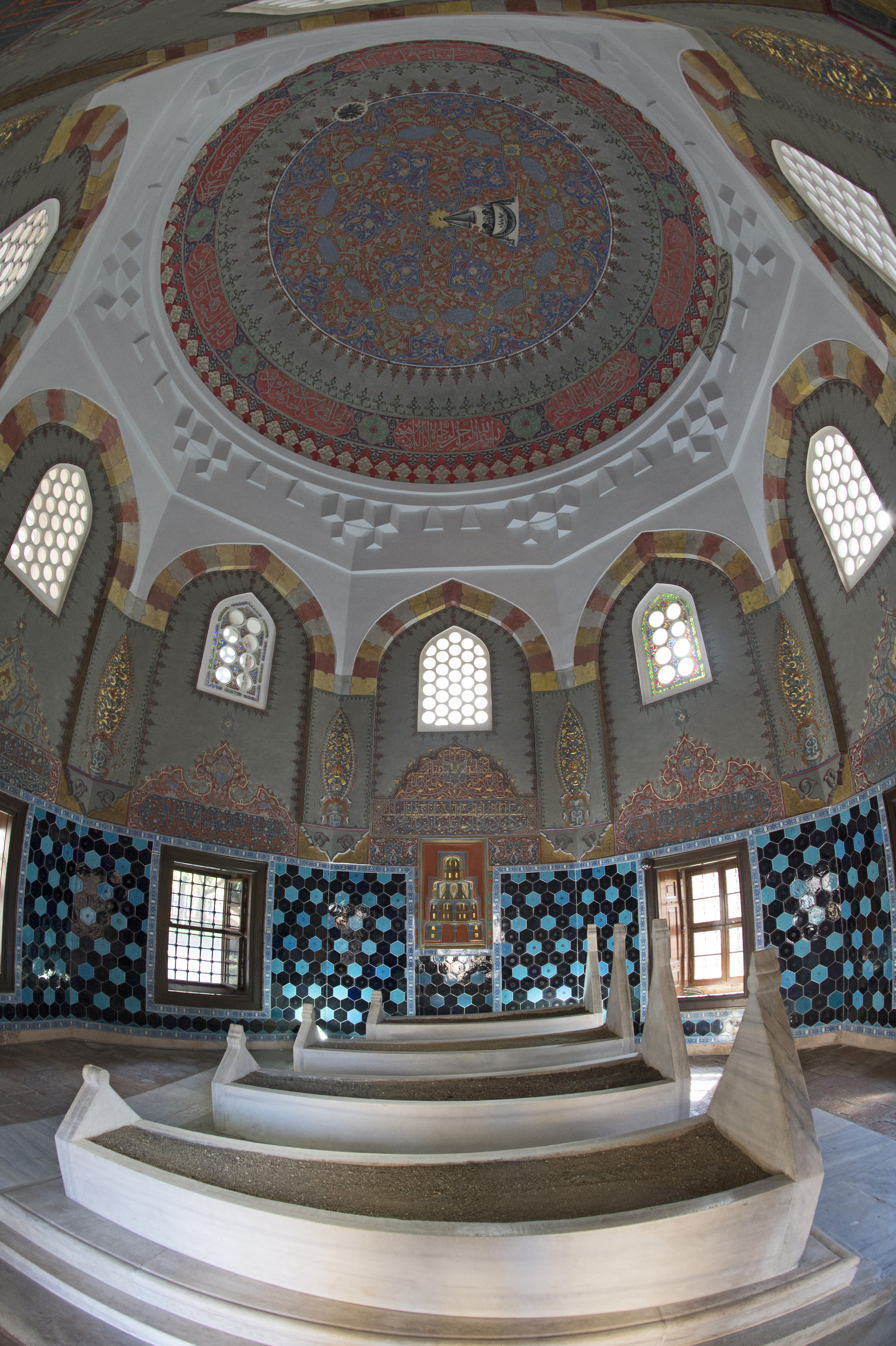
Şehzade Mahmud tomb interior

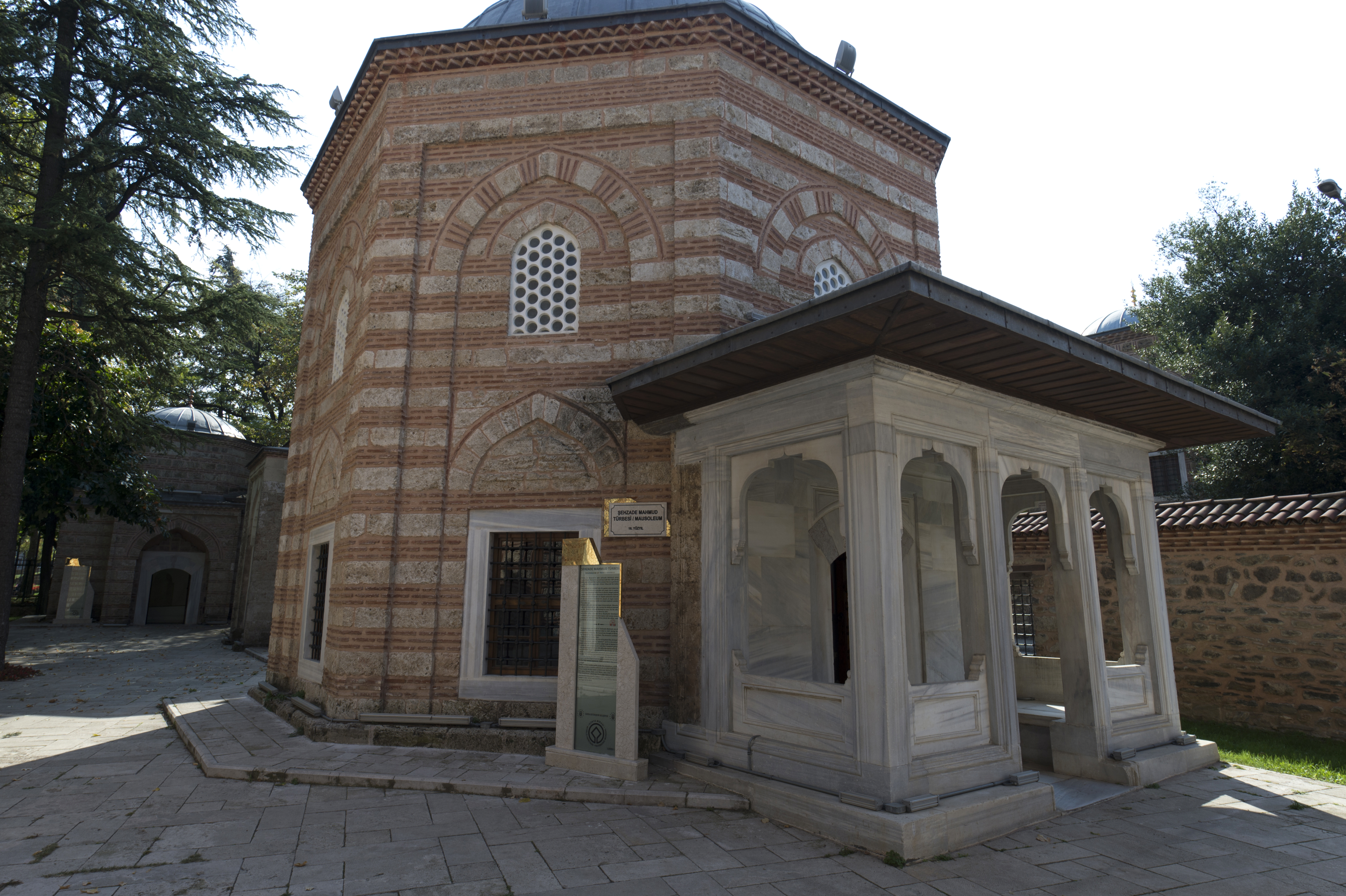
Şehzade Mahmud tomb exterior

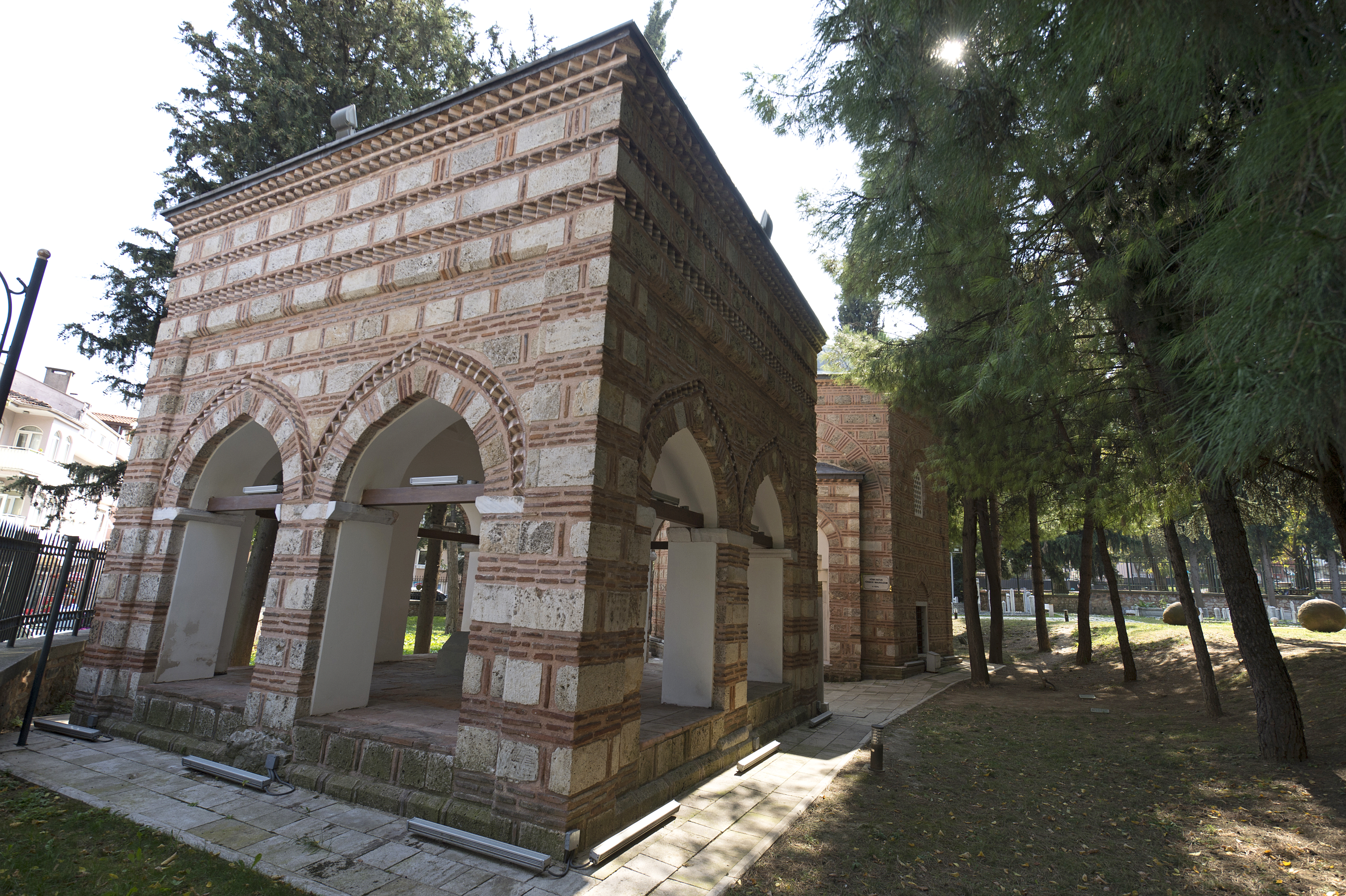
Saraylar Tomb view

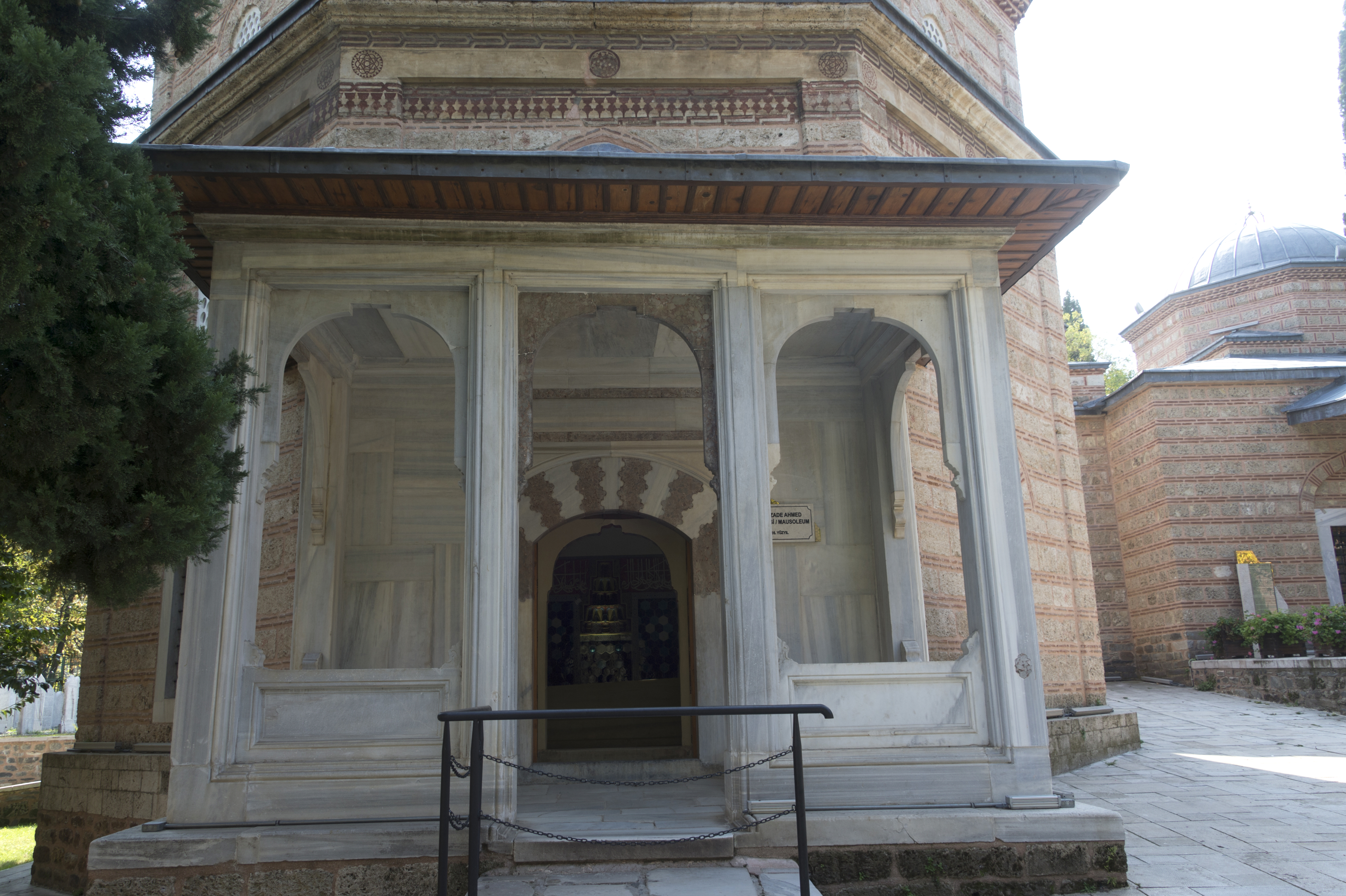
Şehzade Ahmed tomb exterior

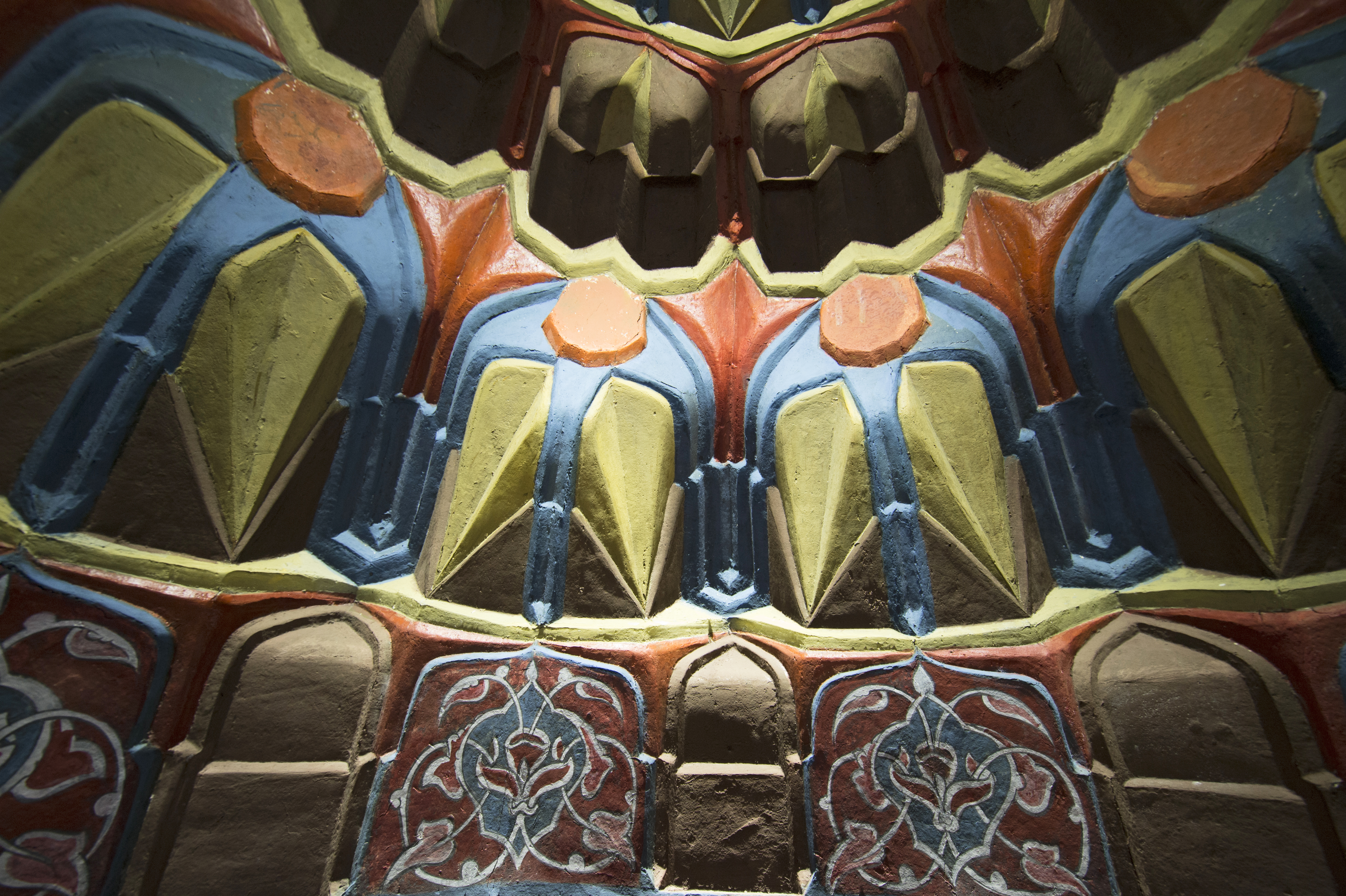
Şehzade Ahmed tomb interior (detail of decoratrion above mihrab)

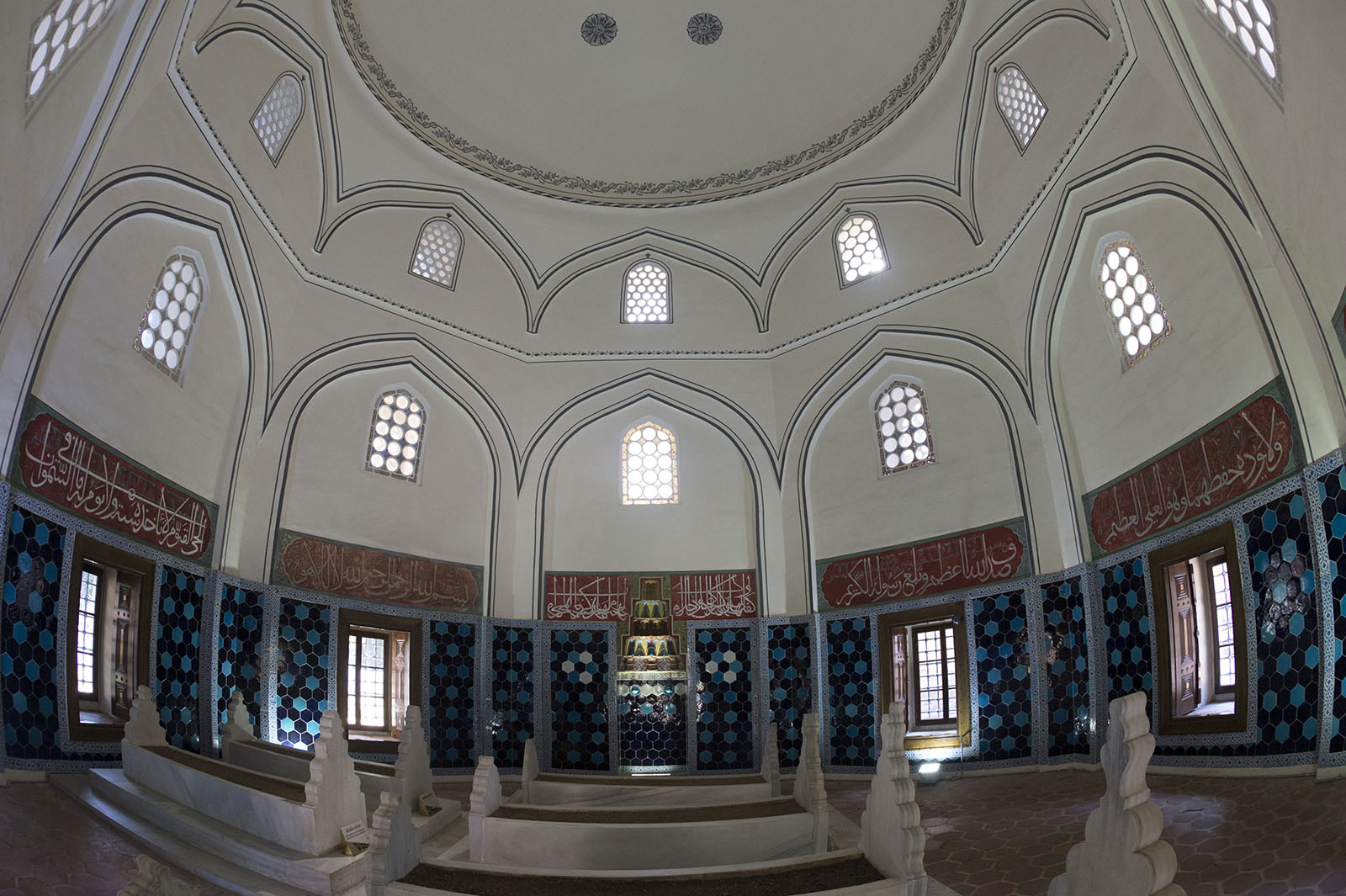
Şehzade Ahmed tomb interior

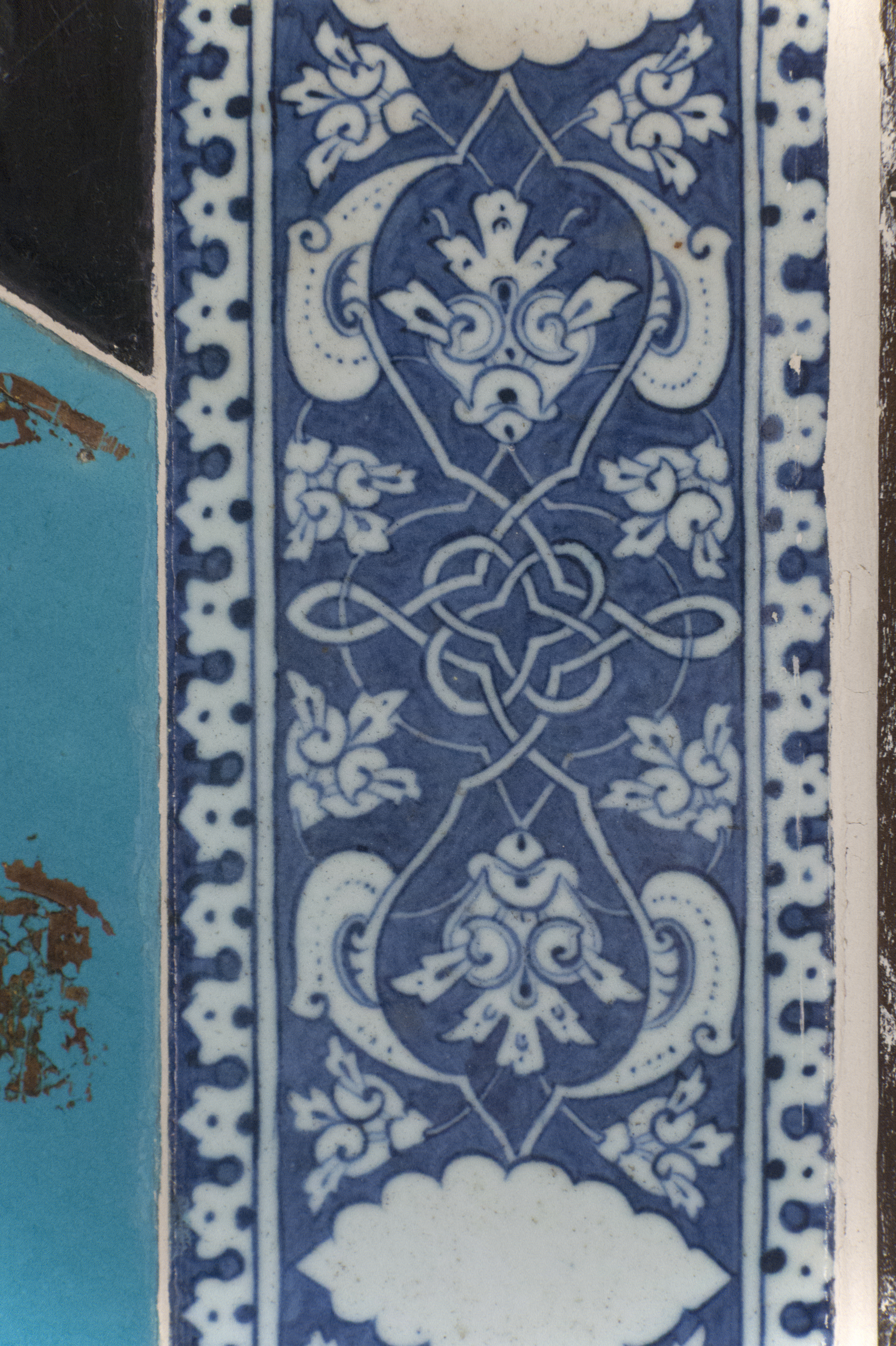
Şehzade Mahmud tomb decoration

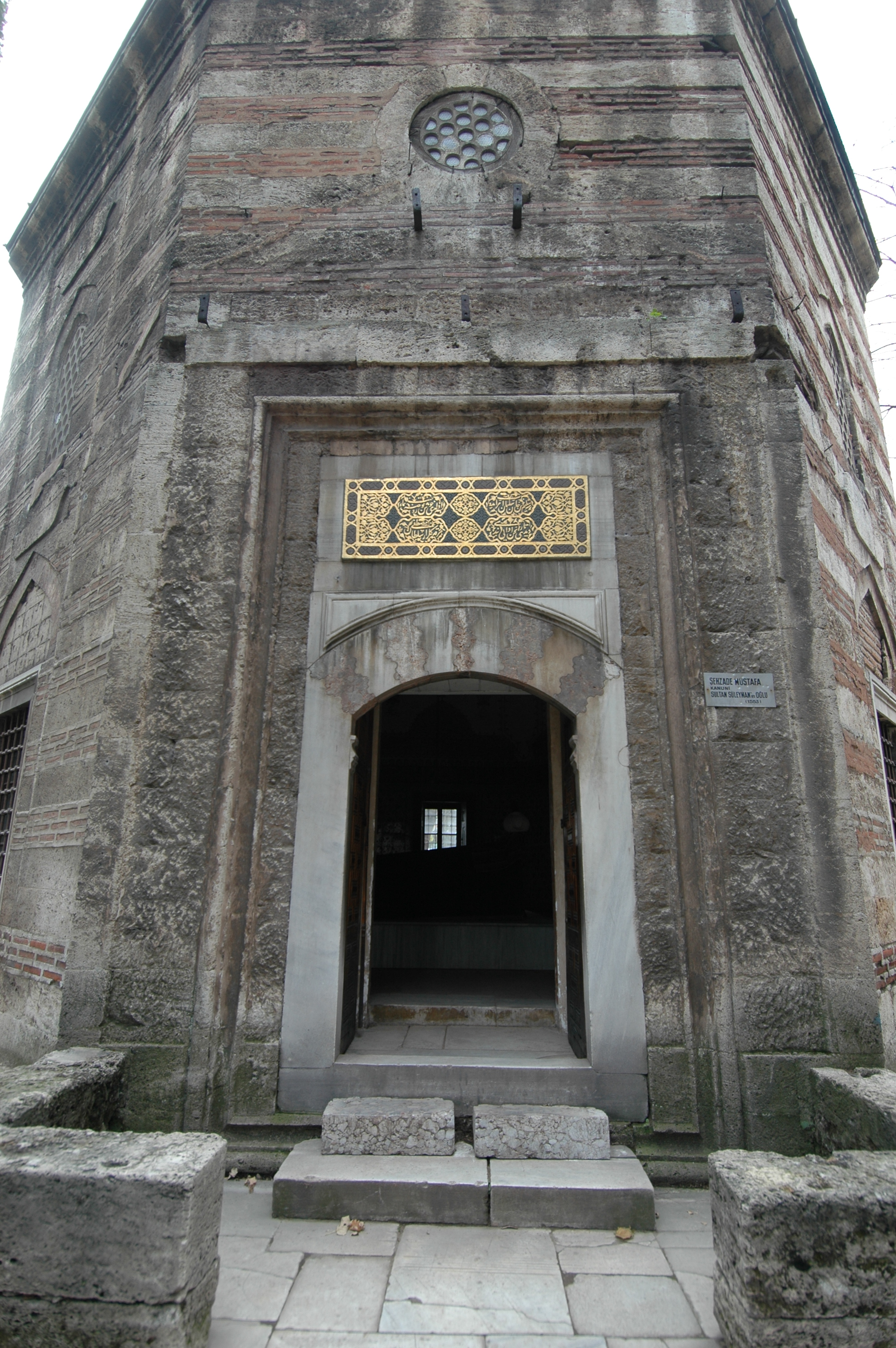
Şehzade Mustafa tomb Exterior

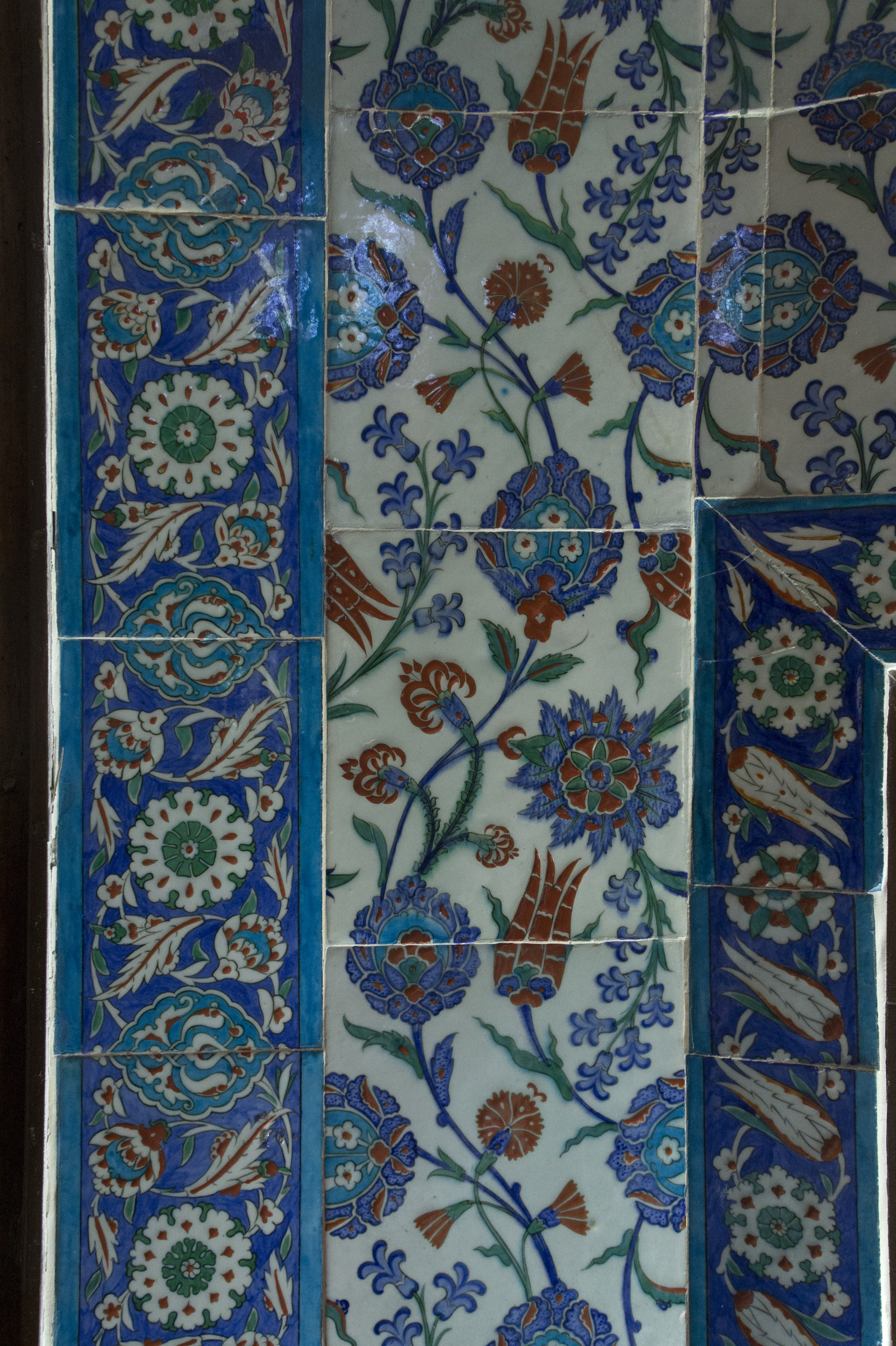
Şehzade Mustafa tomb decoration

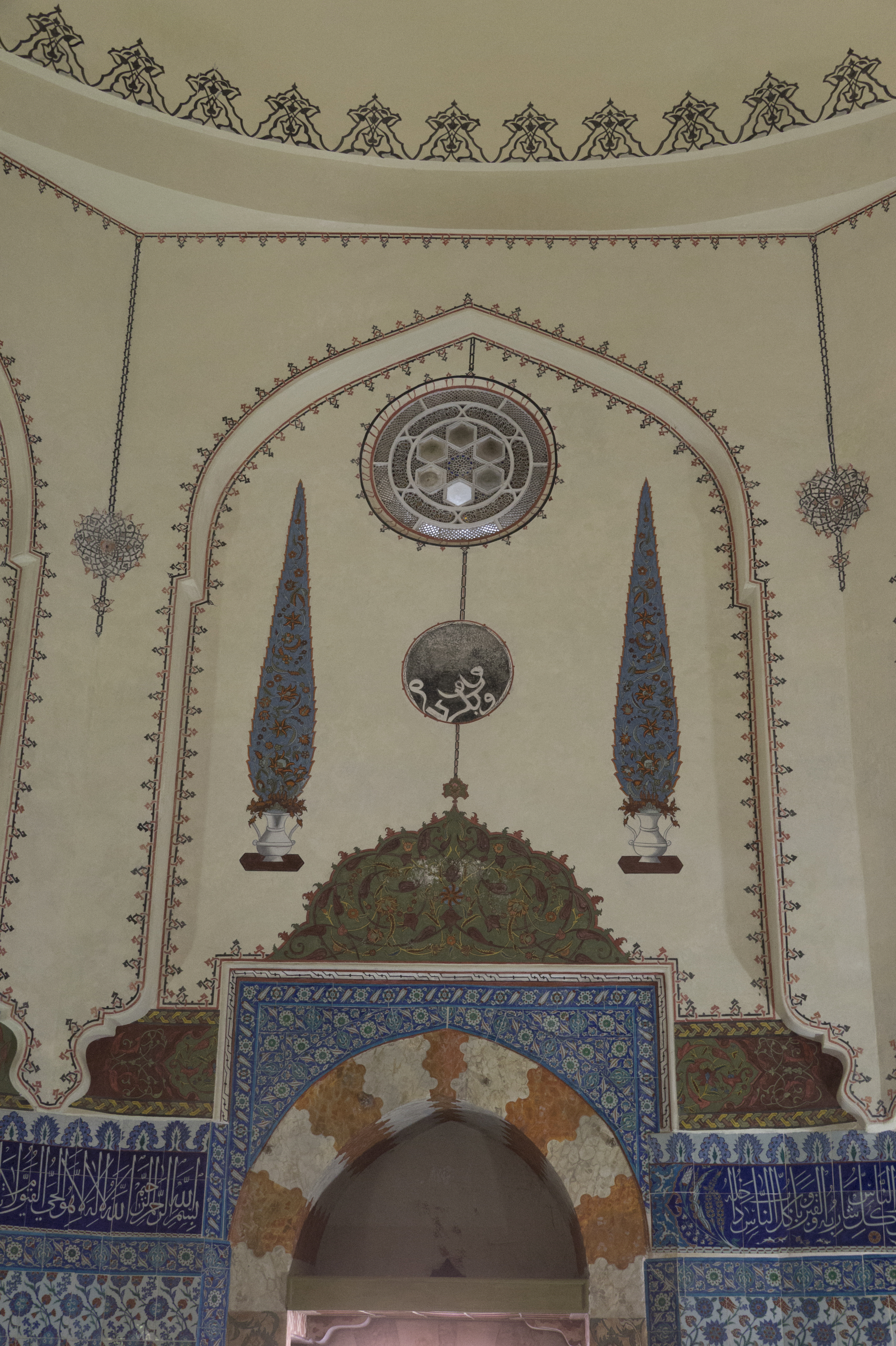
Şehzade Mustafa tomb decoration

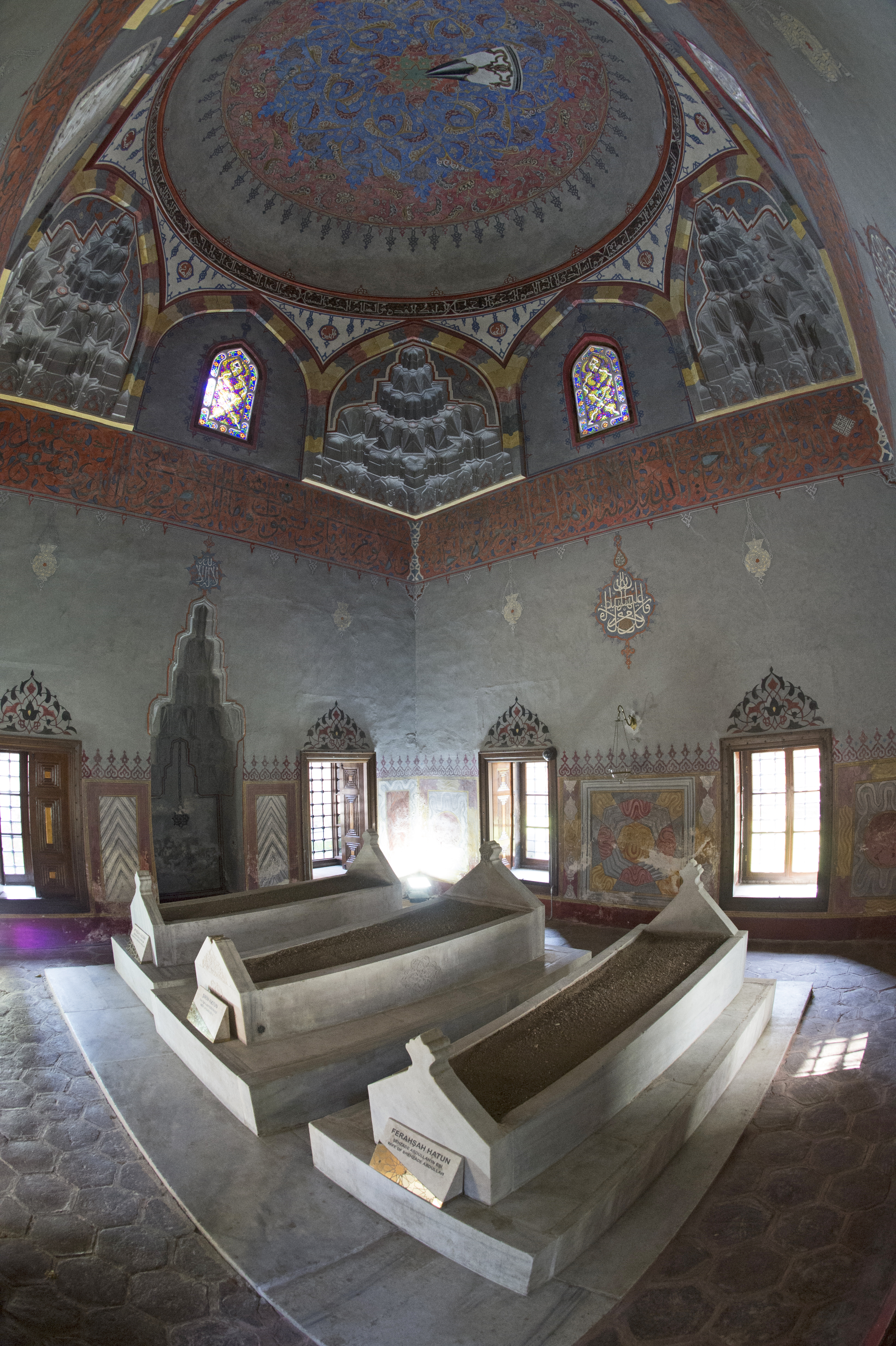
Şirin Hatun tomb interior

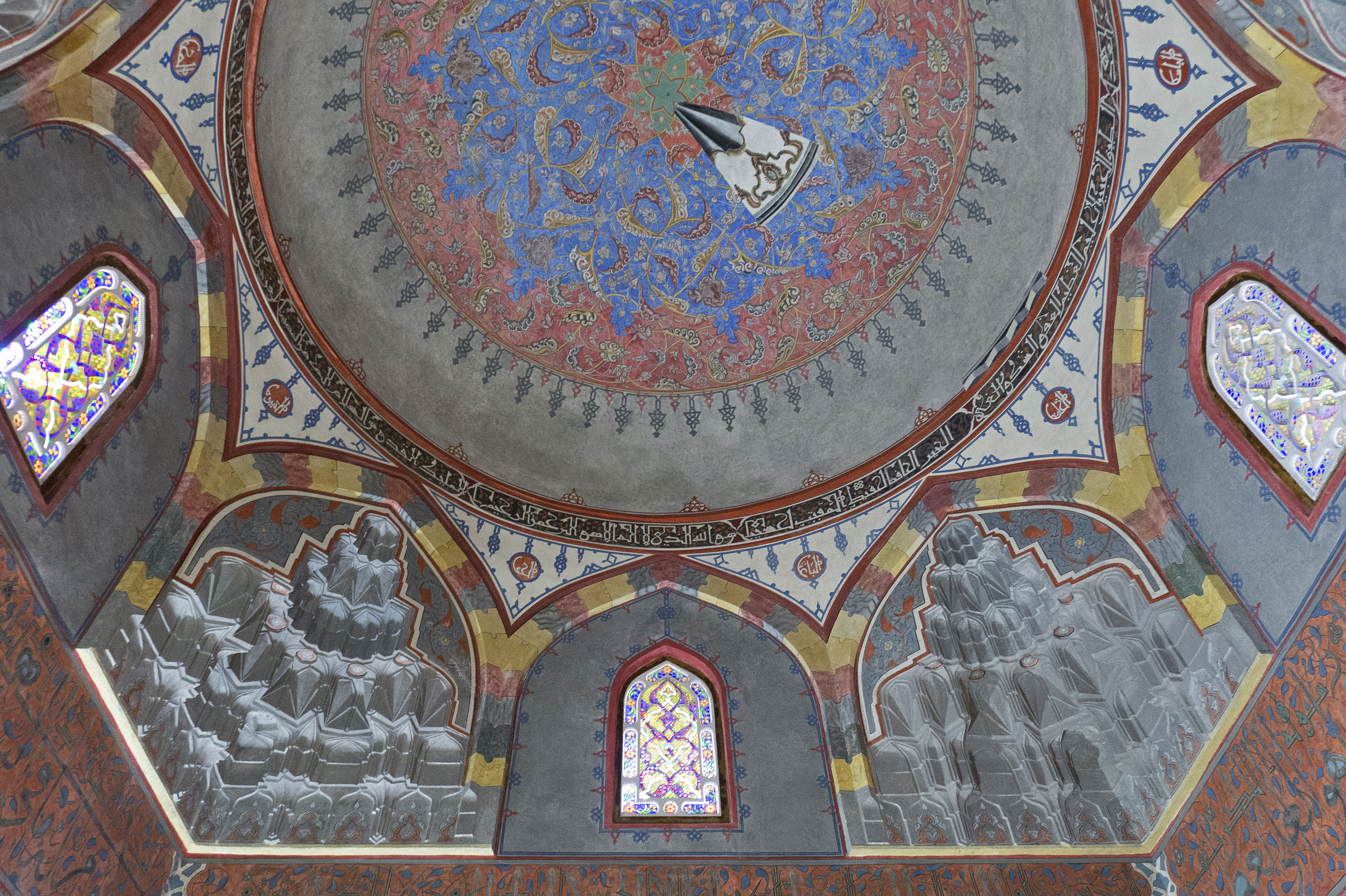
Şirin Hatun tomb interior

== See also ==
- Complex of Mehmed I
- Gülruh Hatun
- Şirin Hatun
- Bülbül Hatun
