= Gülşah Hatun =

Concubine of Sultan Mehmed II

- Hazret-i hatun-ı mu'azzama
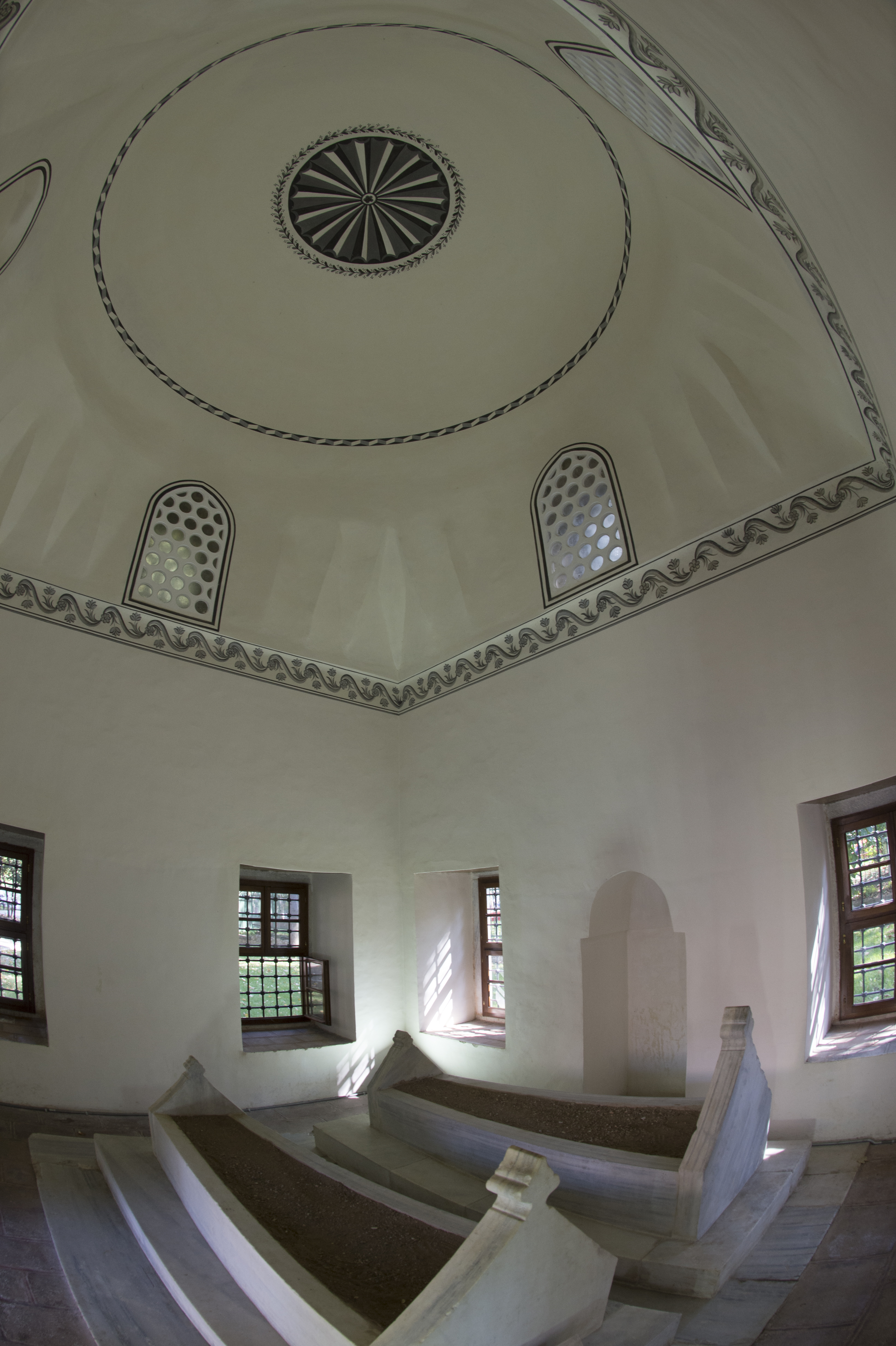
- The sarcophagus of Gülşah Hatun is located in Muradiye Complex in Bursa.
- Died: c. 1487; Bursa, Ottoman Empire
- Burial: Muradiye Complex, Bursa
- Consort of: Mehmed II
- Issue: Şehzade Mustafa

Gülşah Hatun (Ottoman Turkish: کل شاہ خاتون, died c. 1487) was a concubine of Sultan Mehmed II of the Ottoman Empire.

== Early years ==
There are claims that she was a daughter of Ibrahim Sultan of the Karamanids or a concubine. She entered Mehmed's harem in 1449, when he was still a prince and the governor of Manisa. In 1450, just before Sultan Murad II's death and Mehmed's ascension, she gave birth to her only son, Şehzade Mustafa, who would become his father's favourite son. According to Ottoman tradition, all princes were expected to work as provincial governors as a part of their training. After his circumcision ceremony in 1457, Mustafa received his first sanjak appointment in Manisa, and proceeded there accompanied by his mother, Gülşah Hatun. In 1467, he was appointed to the sanjak of Konya, and Gülşah Hatun again accompanied him.

In the salary registers, Gülşah Hatun is recorded as "Hazret-i hatun-ı muʿazzama" meaning "Her Exalted Lady" (or "the Most Venerable Lady").

== Mustafa's death ==
Mustafa died on 25 December 1474. It was rumored that Mustafa had made Grand Vizier Mahmud Pasha's wife, Selçuk Hatun, his lover, and that Mahmud retaliated by poisoning Mustafa. There are speculations that Gülşah Hatun may have been a party to the illicit relations between the prince and Selçuk Hatun, wife of Mahmud Pasha. Selçuk Hatun was sister of Hatice Hatun, one of Mehmed II's consorts. Giovanni Maria Angiolello, a Venetian traveler, author of an important historical report on the Aq Qoyunlu and early Safavid Persia, who was in the service of Mustafa, and who with the rest of Mustafa's household accompanied the prince's cortege from his post his Kayseri to Bursa, where he was buried, denied any role for Mahmud Pasha in Mustafa's death; nevertheless, Mehmed II had the man executed shortly thereafter.

Gülşah Hatun had not been informed of her son's death, and when the wagon carrying his body stopped outside the palace, she and the women of her train began to wail. Babinger wrote that Mustafa's daughter, Nergiszade Ferahşad Hatun, shared her grandmother's grief, and the lamentations went on endlessly. Mehmed sent word that she should remain in Bursa with those maidens whom she required. Mehmed also had a good provision made for her, where she might live there honorably. He ordered that Mustafa's daughter and her mother and the rest of the ladies, together with all others belonging to the court of his deceased son, should come to Istanbul. All the women were lodged in the palace where women of Mehmed's harem stayed, and after several days the maidens were married to courtiers. Nergisşah Ferahşad married her cousin Şehzade Abdullah, the eldest son of Şehzade Bayezid (future Bayezid II) in 1480.

== Last years and death ==
In 1479, Gülşah Hatun was granted the village of Sığırcalu in Dimetoka, its revenues were converted into mülk so that Gülşah could turn it into an endowment for the eventual upkeep of her tomb in Bursa. Gülşah Hatun died in 1487, and was buried in Bursa in the tomb she had built for herself near that of Mustafa. The tomb of Gülşah Hatun has an entrance with elegant jogged voussoirs, and marble cenotaphs inside, newly made from old pieces.

== Issue ==
By Mehmed II, Gülşah had a son:

- Şehzade Mustafa (1450 - 25 December 1474, died of illness or was allegedly poisoned by Mahmud Pasha). Sanjakbey of Konya, he had at least two daughters.

== Popular culture ==
- In the Turkish historical fiction series Mehmed: Fetihler Sultanı, Gülşah Hatun was first portrayed by Turkish actress Sena Çakır and currently by Begüm Birgören. In the series, she is shown to be Karamanoğlu Ibrahim Bey's daughter.

== Bibliography ==
- Cvetkova, Bistra (1983). "Early Ottoman Tahrir Defters as a source for studies on the history of Bulgaria and the Balkans". Archivum Ottomanicum. 8. Mouton.
- Babinger, Franz (1992). Mehmed the Conqueror and His Time. Princeton University Press. ISBN 978-0-691-01078-6.
- Mehmet Süreyya Bey (1969). Osmanlı devletinde kim kimdi, Volume 1. Küğ Yayını. ISBN 978-9-004-12106-5.
- Greenhalgh, Michael (2009). Marble Past, Monumental Present: Building With Antiquities in the Mediaeval Mediterranean. BRILL. ISBN 978-9-004-17083-4.
- Peirce, Leslie P. (1993). The Imperial Harem: Women and Sovereignty in the Ottoman Empire. Oxford University Press. ISBN 978-0-195-08677-5.
- Sakaoğlu, Necdet (2008). Bu mülkün kadın sultanları: Vâlide sultanlar, hâtunlar, hasekiler, kadınefendiler, sultanefendiler. Oğlak Yayıncılık. ISBN 978-9-753-29623-6.
- Stavrides, Théoharis (2001). The Sultan of Vezirs: The Life and Times of the Ottoman Grand Vezir Mahmud Pasha Angelović (1453-1474). BRILL. ISBN 978-9-004-12106-5.
- Uluçay, M. Çağatay (2011). Padişahların kadınları ve kızları. Türk Tarih Kurumu.
- Artan, Tülay (1996). Zachariadou, Elizabeth (ed.). Periods and problems of Ottoman (women's) patronage on the Via Egnatia. The Via Egnatia Under Ottoman Rule (1380–1699). Halcyon Days in Crete, II: A Symposium Held in Rethymnon 1994. Rethymnon: Crete University Press. pp. 19–43.
