= Khonkar-nama =

- Author: Mir 'Ali b. Mozaffar (Mo'āli)
- Language: Persian
- Subject: Ottoman Empire; Timurid Empire; Aq Qoyunlu; Qara Qoyunlu
- Published: 1949 (Turkish)
- Publication date: c. 1474

Khonkar-nama (Note: Historian John E. Woods calls it Khondkarnama) is a historical chronicle, written in Persian, by Mir 'Ali b. Mozaffar (Note: Historian Sara Nur Yildiz calls him Mo'āli.) (Note: Woods refers to him as Sayyed Mir 'Ali Tusi, 'Ma'ali'.) that covers the history of the Ottoman Empire, Timurid Empire, and the Turkoman confederations of the Aq Qoyunlu and Qara Qoyunlu. Written without regard for chronology, Mozaffar's work is not an historical narrative, instead written in 4-5 sections covering different times and areas. The modern version was published in 1949, in Turkish, by Robert Anhegger who had been doing research in the Topkapi Saray Hazine Library in 1948.

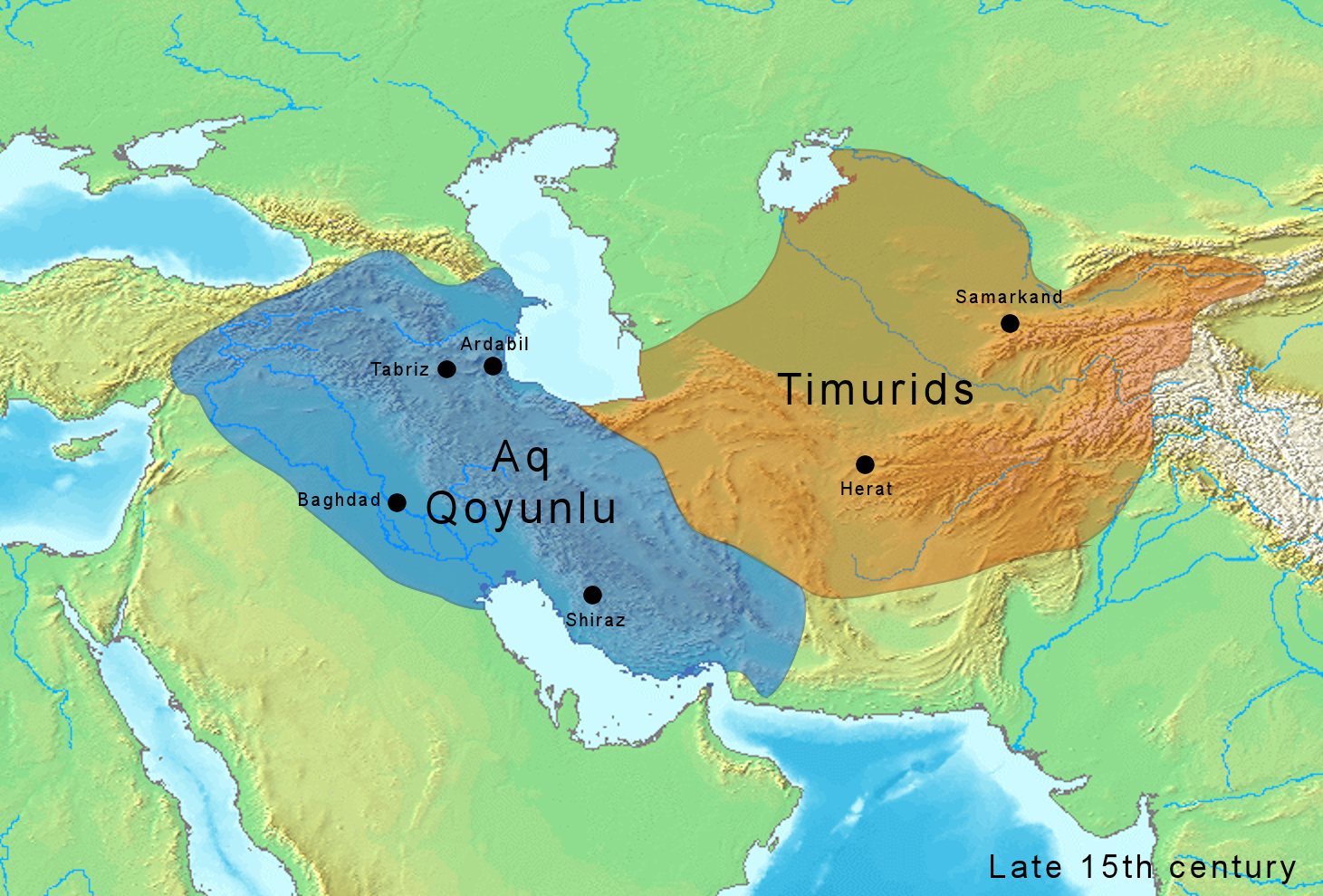
Aq Qoyunlu mentioned in the Khonkar-nama

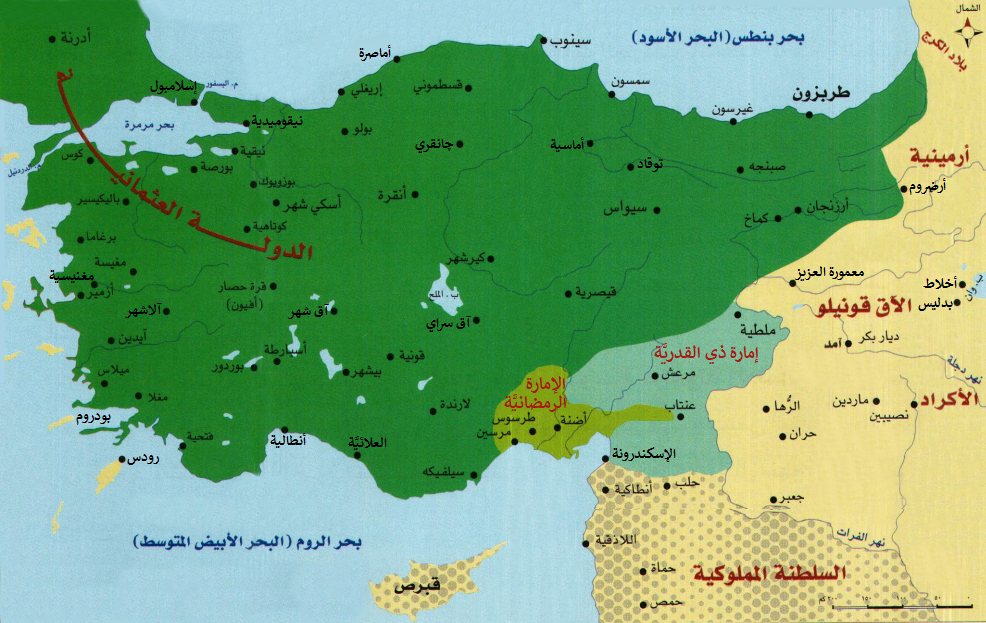
Ottoman Empire mentioned in the Khonkar-nama

== Content ==
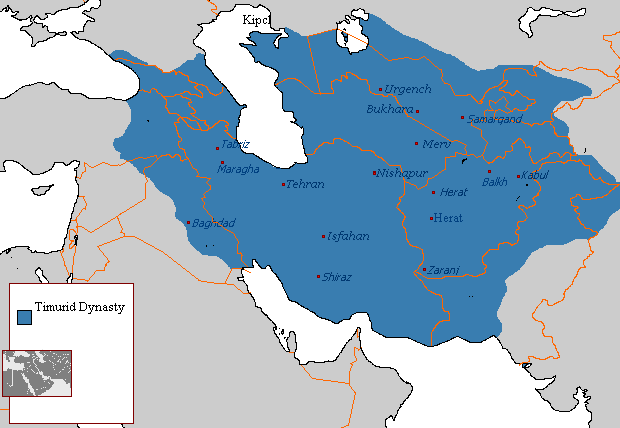
Timurid Empire mentioned in the Khonkar-nama

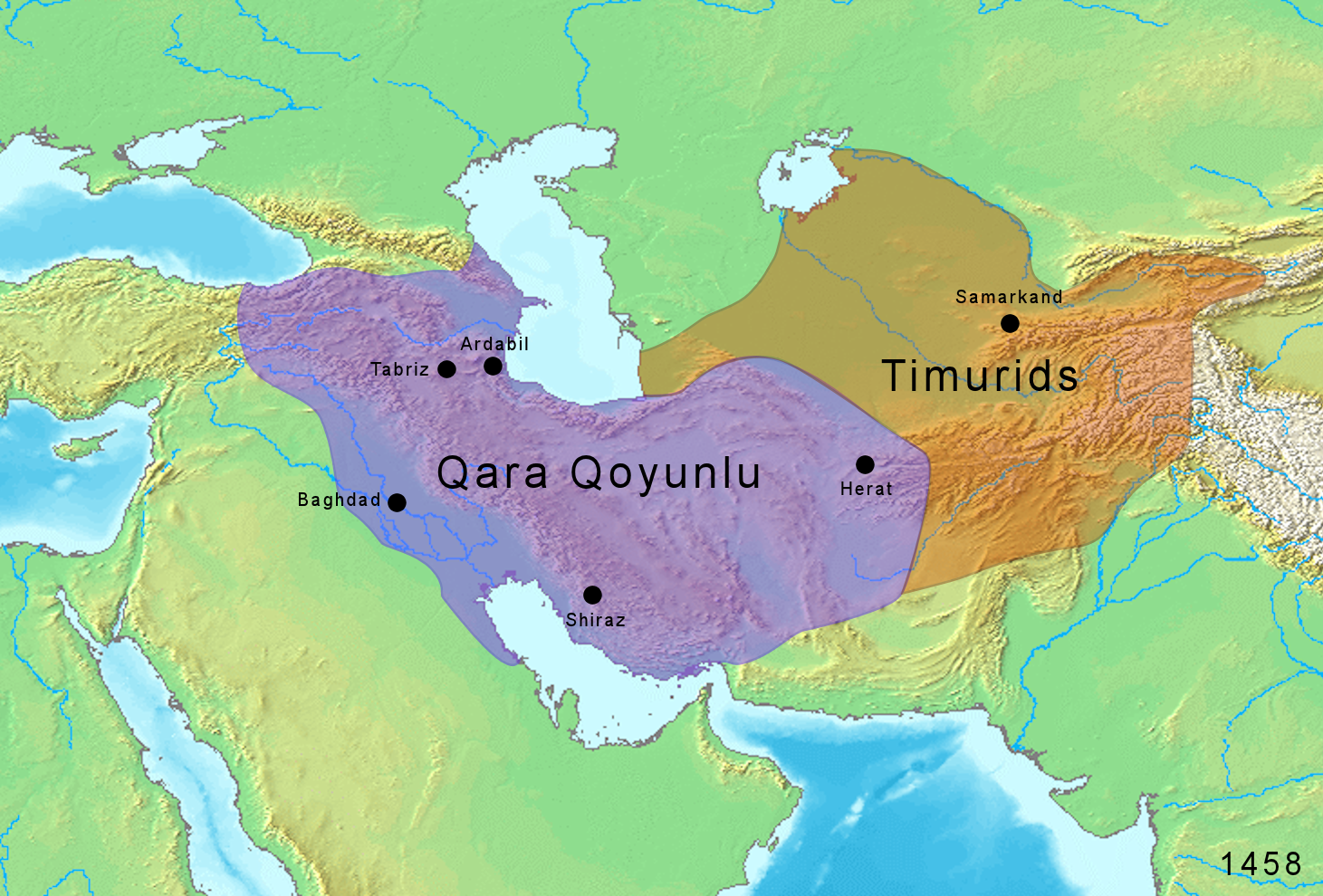
Qara Qoyunlu mentioned in the Khonkar-nama

The Khonkar-nama constitutes an important source for the history of the Timurids, the Aq Qoyunlu, and the Qara Qoyunlu. Moʿali, in the introduction of the Khonkar-nama, praises Mehmed II, sultan of the Ottoman Empire. He indicates its composition immediately began following Uzun Hasan's sack of the Ottoman city of Tokat in eastern Anatolia, and finished the work after 1474. Although the work is written in Persian verse and comprises approximately 5,000 couplets, predominantly in the motaqārib meter, it cannot be classified as a Shāhnāma-style historical narrative or readily conform to any conventional historiographical genre. The text exhibits little regard for chronological sequence.

The chronicle is organized into four/five sections, (Note: Woods states the chronicle is in five sections.) the first of which opens with an account of the reign of Mehmed II. This section emphasizes his victories over Uzun Hasan of the Aq Qoyunlu and Ismaʿil, the Isfandiyarid ruler of Kastamonu—and offers particularly detailed treatment of the circumstances preceding, surrounding, and following Uzun Hasan's defeat at the Battle of Otlukbeli in 1473.

The next section presents a concise historical overview of Timur and his successors, together with the Qara Qoyunlu and Aq Qoyunlu Turkomen confederations. The conflict between Bayezid I and Timur are highlight but Mo'āli omits any mention of the Battle of Ankara. In his depiction of Shahrokh's reception of an embassy sent by Murad II in the aftermath of the Battle of Varna in 1444, Mo'āli highlights the Ottomans’ use of military success as a means of political signaling, whereby victories achieved in the western theaters were proclaimed to intimidate rival powers in the east. This section of Mo'āli's work has been used exclusively by the historian Zeki Velidi Togan.

The following section is an autobiographical narrative recounting the Mo'āli's travels.

The last section concludes with an account of the violent death of Prince Mustafa in 1473–74, followed by the execution of the grand vizier Mahmud Pasha, and a closing notice concerning the arrival of a Mamluk embassy in Istanbul in 1474–75.

== Modern publication ==
The Khonkar-nama was first published in an article, in Turkish, in 1949 by Robert Anhegger. Anhegger, while doing research in Istanbul in 1948, discovered manuscript No. 1417 in the Topkapi Saray Hazine Library. It was listed as an anonymous Ottoman history in the library catalogue.

== Sources ==
- Woods, John E. (2020). "Two Later Ninth/Fifteenth-Century Iranian Travellers". In Melville, Charles (ed.). The Timurid Century: The Idea of Iran. Vol. 9. Bloomsbury Publishing. pp. 77–96. ISBN 9781838606152.
- Yildiz, Sara Nur (2004). "Persian in the Service of the Sultan: Historical Writing in Persian under the Ottomans during the 15th and 16th Centuries". In Arjomand, Saïd Amir (ed.). Studies on Persianate Societies. Vol. 2. Brill. pp. 145–166. ISBN 978-90-04-73272-8.
