= Gülruh Hatun =

Concubine of Ottoman Sultan Bayezid II

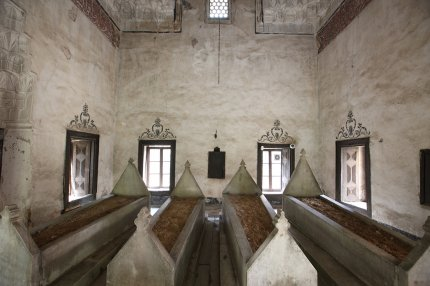
- The tomb of "Gülruh Hatun" is located inside Gülruh Hatun Mausoleum, Bursa
- Died: 3 June 1528; Bursa, Ottoman Empire
- Burial: Muradiye Complex, Bursa
- Spouse: Bayezid II
- Issue: Şehzade Alemşah; Kamerşah Sultan
- Religion: Sunni Islam

Gülruh Hatun (Ottoman Turkish: کل رخ خاتون; died 3 June 1528), also known as Gülendam Hatun (Ottoman Turkish: کل اندام خاتون, "Rose soul"), was a concubine of Sultan Bayezid II of the Ottoman Empire.

== Early life ==
Her origin is unknown, but the consorts of the Ottoman sultans were by custom normally concubines who came to the Ottoman Imperial harem via the Ottoman slave trade. Gülruh entered Bayezid's harem at Amasya. With Bayezid she had two children, a son, Şehzade Alemşah, born in 1466 and a daughter, Kamerşah Sultan, born in 1476.

== Accompanying Alemşah ==
According to Turkish tradition, all princes were expected to work as provincial governors as a part of their training. In 1490, Alemşah was sent to Menteşe, and in 1502 to Manisa, and Gülruh accompanied him. She played an anxious role in protecting her son from manipulation by members of his princely entourage and to ensure that the Sultan regarded the latter, and not the prince or herself, as responsible for the reports he had received about Alemşah's misconduct.

She responded to the Sultan's instruction that she took to the conduct of her son. She presented her case against seven members of her son's suite, including his tutor, his doctor, and his preceptor, to whom she attributed responsibility for the problems. It was Alemşah's tutor in particular whom she blamed. She accused the tutor and his colleagues of inducing Alemşah to drink excessively so that he might be persuaded to sanction proposals against the law of Islam and the law of the Sultan.

Worried about Alemşah's ill health, she described his difficult recovery from a month-long bout unable to bear any longer the corruption of these evil doers, she brought the tutor's shortcomings to the Sultan's attention, among them the squandering of the prince's treasury to the extent that even she had not received her stipend for a year. But the tutor had dismissed her protest as the work of the chief eunuch of the prince's private household, and unjustly denounced the latter to the Sultan.

Gülruh Hatun implored the Sultan to remove them. She was concerned not only for the precariousness of her son's physical and political condition but also for the preservation of her own rights and status.

== Issue ==
From Bayezid II, Gülruh had a daughter and a son:

- Şehzade Alemşah (Amasya, 1466 - Manisa, 1502). Governor of Mentese and Manisa, he died of problems related to his alcoholism and the unruly life he led. He had a son, Şehzade Osman Şah (1492-1512, killed by Selim I), and two daughters, Ayşe Sultan (married to his cousin Sultanzade Mehmed Çelebi, son of Fatma Sultan, daughter of Bayezid II) and Fatma Sultan (1493-1522, buried in the Gülruh's mausoleum).
- Kamerşah Sultan (Amasya, 1476 - Constantinople, 1520), also known as Kamer Sultan. She married in 1491 Koca Mustafa Pasha, with whom she resided in Malkara and had a daughter, Hundi Hanımsultan, who married Mesih Bey; and a son, Sultanzade Osman Bey. She widowed on 1512 and remarried with Nişancı Kara Davud Pasha. She and her son were buried in the Gülruh's mausoleum.

== Charities ==
Gülruh Hatun built a mosque and an endowment in Akhisar, a mosque in Aydın Güzelhisar and Duraklı Village, She built Hamams, rest house for travellers and another endowment was built in Gördes, Demirci, Nazilli, Birgi and Aydın Güzelhisan.

== Last years ==
After Alemşah's death in 1503, she retired to Bursa, and died early in Suleiman the Magnificent's reign. She is buried in her own mausoleum located in Muradiye Complex, Bursa.

== Sources ==
- Narodna biblioteka "Sv. sv. Kiril i Metodiĭ. Orientalski otdel, International Centre for Minority Studies and Intercultural Relations, Research Centre for Islamic History, Art, and Culture (2003). Inventory of Ottoman Turkish documents about Waqf preserved in the Oriental Department at the St. St. Cyril and Methodius National Library: Registers. Narodna biblioteka "Sv. sv. Kiril i Metodiĭ.
- Peirce, Leslie P. (1993). The Imperial Harem: Women and Sovereignty in the Ottoman Empire. Oxford University Press. ISBN 978-0-195-08677-5.
- Sakaoğlu, Necdet (2008). Bu mülkün kadın sultanları: Vâlide sultanlar, hâtunlar, hasekiler, kadınefendiler, sultanefendiler. Oğlak Yayıncılık. ISBN 978-9-753-29623-6.
- Süleyman I (Sultan of the Turks) (1970). Kanunî armaǧani. Türk Tarih Kurumu Basimevi.
- Türk Tarih Kurumu (1970). Publications de la Société d'histoire turque. Türk Tarih Kurumu Basımevı.
- Uluçay, Mustafa Çağatay (2011). Padişahların kadınları ve kızları. Ankara: Ötüken. ISBN 978-9-754-37840-5.
