= Social justice index =

International social justice ranking

A social justice index is a set of numbers which have been calculated through weighing several indicators of various entities, usually countries, but also regions or commercial firms. These indicators are considered related to social justice.

The European Union Social Justice Index, published in September 2015 by Bertelsmann Stiftung, is based on 35 indicators. The highest number (7.48) is given to Sweden, whilst the lowest one (3.57) goes to Greece.

The Social Justice in the EU and OECD Index, published in September 2019 also by Bertelsmann Stiftung, ranks 41 countries, from the highest one (7.90, Iceland) to the lowest one (4.76, Mexico). It considers 6 dimensions of social justice: poverty prevention, equitable education, labor market access, social inclusion and non-discrimination, intergenerational justice and health. For some countries, like Sweden, this index has been calculated since 2009 and every 2 or 3 years.

The Adasina Social Justice Index is a stock market index of about 9,000 publicly traded securities. Adasina is a financial analysis firm. These securities are included in this index (or excluded from it) according to 4 criteria: racial justice, gender justice, economic justice and climate justice. The Adasina Social Justice Index is designed to support progressive movements.

== See also ==
- Government effectiveness index
- World Governance Index
