= Transformation of the Ottoman Empire =

Ottoman Empire from c. 1550 to c. 1700

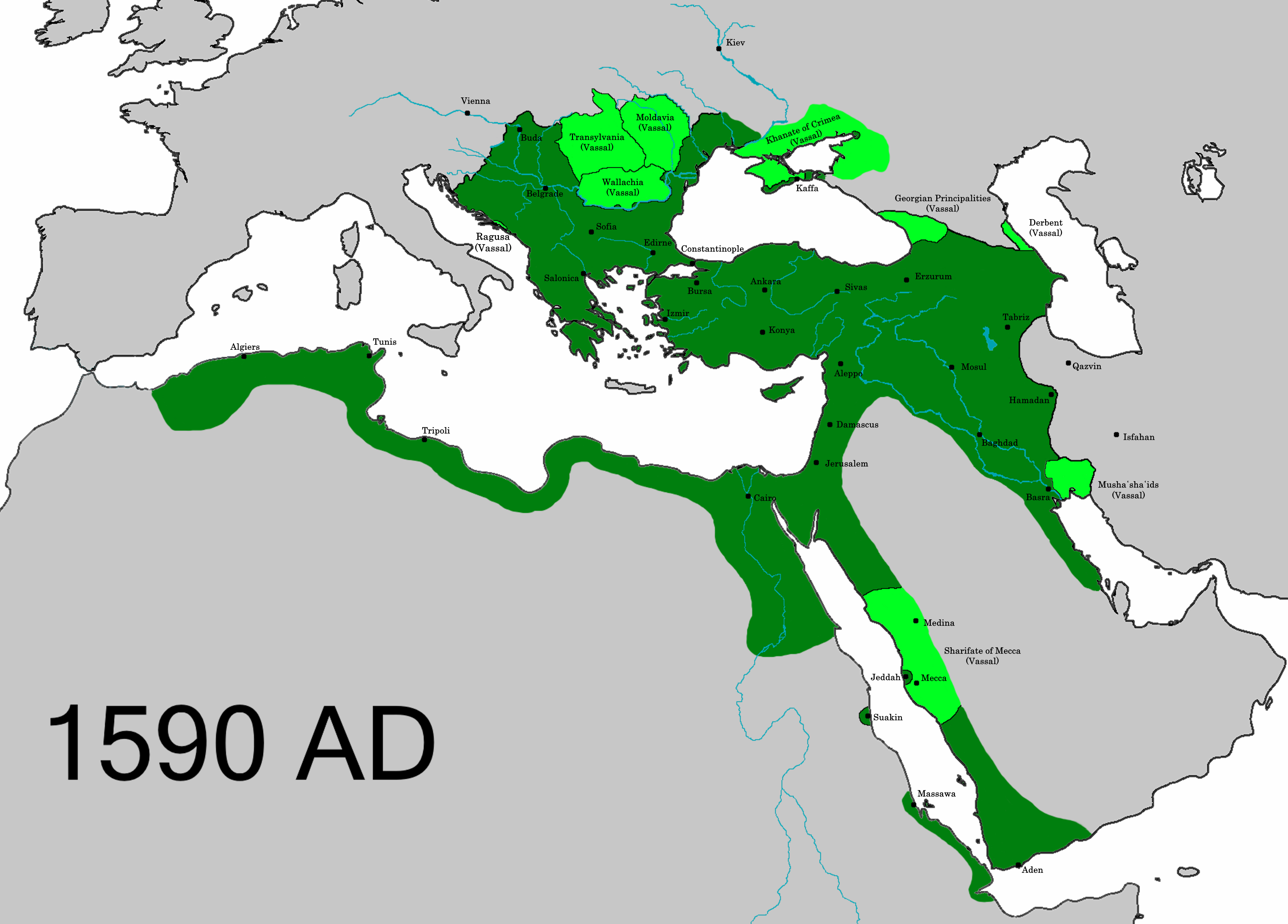
The Ottoman Empire in 1590, at the peak of its territorial expansion

The transformation of the Ottoman Empire, also known as the Era of Transformation, constitutes a period in the history of the Ottoman Empire from c. 1550 to c. 1700, spanning roughly from the end of the reign of Suleiman the Magnificent to the Treaty of Karlowitz at the conclusion of the War of the Holy League. This period was characterized by numerous dramatic political, social, and economic changes, which resulted in the empire shifting from an expansionist, patrimonial state into a bureaucratic empire based on an ideology of upholding justice and acting as the protector of Sunni Islam. These changes were in large part prompted by a series of political and economic crises in the late 16th and early 17th centuries, resulting from inflation, warfare, and political factionalism. Yet despite these crises the empire remained strong both politically and economically, and continued to adapt to the challenges of a changing world. The 17th century was once characterized as a period of decline for the Ottomans, but since the 1980s historians of the Ottoman Empire have increasingly rejected that characterization, identifying it instead as a period of crisis, adaptation, and transformation.

In the second half of the 16th century, the empire came under increasing economic pressure due to rising inflation, which was then impacting both Europe and the Middle East. These economic troubles contributed to the formation of bandit gangs in Anatolia , which by the 1590s coalesced under local warlords to launch a series of conflicts known as the Celali rebellions. Ottoman fiscal insolvency and local rebellion together with the need to compete militarily against their imperial rivals the Habsburgs and Safavids created a severe crisis. The Ottomans thus transformed many of the institutions which had previously defined the empire, gradually disestablishing the Timar system in order to raise modern armies of musketeers, and quadrupling the size of the bureaucracy in order to facilitate more efficient collection of revenues. In Istanbul, changes in the nature of dynastic politics led to the abandonment of the Ottoman tradition of royal fratricide, and to a governmental system that relied much less upon the personal authority of the sultan. Other figures came to play larger roles in government, particularly the women of the Imperial Harem, for which much of this period is often referred to as the Sultanate of Women, as well as Janissaries, who would get sultans dethroned and Grand viziers removed from their post.

The changing nature of sultanic authority led to several political upheavals during the 17th century, as rulers and political factions struggled for control over the imperial government. In 1622 Sultan Osman II was overthrown in a Janissary uprising. His subsequent regicide was sanctioned by the empire's chief judicial official, demonstrating a reduced importance of the sultan in Ottoman politics. Nevertheless, the primacy of the Ottoman dynasty as a whole was never brought into question. Of seventeenth-century sultans, Mehmed IV was the longest reigning, occupying the throne for 39 years from 1648 to 1687. The empire experienced a long period of stability under his reign, spearheaded by the reform-minded Köprülü family of grand viziers. This coincided with a period of renewed conquest in Europe, conquests which culminated in the disastrous Siege of Vienna in 1683 and the fall from grace of the Köprülü family. Following the battle a coalition of Christian powers was assembled to combat the Ottomans, bringing about the fall of Ottoman Hungary and its annexation by the Habsburgs during the War of the Holy League (1683–99). The war provoked another political crisis and prompted the Ottomans to carry out additional administrative reforms. These reforms ended the problem of financial insolvency and made the transformation from a patrimonial to a bureaucratic state a permanent one.

== Territory ==
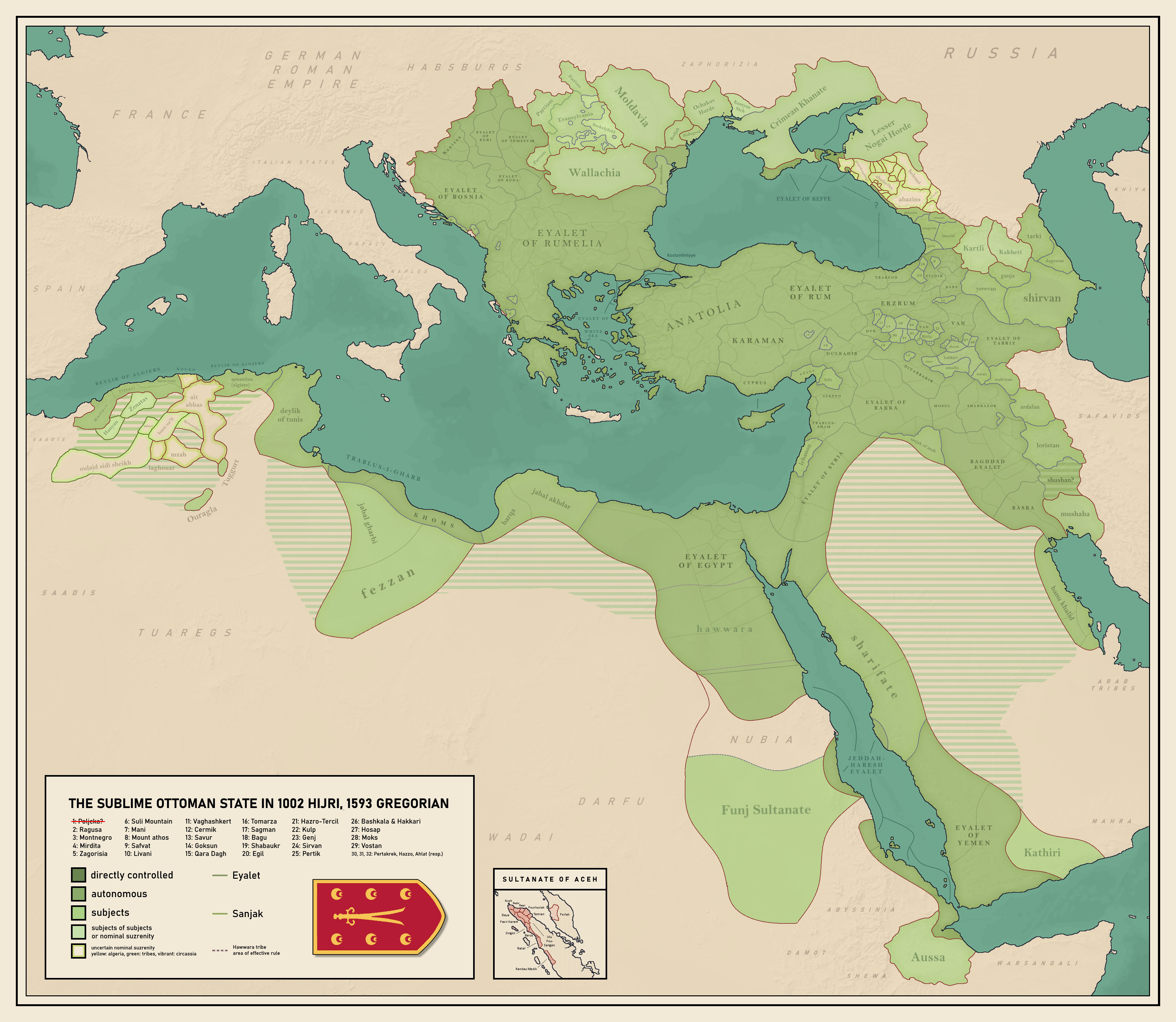
Eyalets of the Ottoman Empire in 1593

In comparison with earlier periods of Ottoman history, the empire's territory remained relatively stable, stretching from Algeria in the west to Iraq in the east, and from Arabia in the south to Hungary in the north. The pace of expansion slowed during the second half of the reign of Suleiman the Magnificent (1520–66), as the Ottomans sought to consolidate the vast conquests carried out between 1514 and 1541, (Note: The period from 1514 (the Battle of Çaldıran) to 1541 (the annexation of Buda) was the most rapid period of expansion in the empire's history. The Ottomans annexed eastern Anatolia, Syria, Egypt, Iraq, most of North Africa, and much of Hungary.) but did not come to an end. After making peace with Austria in 1568, the Ottomans launched the Ottoman–Venetian War (1570–1573), conquering Cyprus and most of Dalmatia. A naval campaign led to the capture of Tunis from the Spanish in 1574, and a truce was signed in 1580.

Subsequently, the Ottomans resumed warfare with the Safavids in the Ottoman–Safavid War (1578–90), conquering Georgia, Azerbaijan, and western Iran. The war resulted in the Ottomans reaching their greatest territorial expansion under Murad III. In 1593 a frontier incident led to the renewal of warfare with Habsburg Austria in the Long War (1593–1606), in which neither side was able to achieve decisive victory. The Ottomans briefly held Győr (Yanık, 1594–8), but lost control of Novigrad (1594), exposing Buda to attacks from the north. By the end of the war the Ottomans had conquered the strategic fortresses of Eger (Eğri, 1596) and Nagykanizsa (Kanije, 1600). The Safavids took advantage of Ottoman distraction in the west to reverse all of their recent gains in the east in the Ottoman–Safavid War (1603–18). After the turmoil of Osman II's regicide, the Safavids also seized Baghdad and much of Iraq in 1623, holding it until 1638, after which the border of the 1555 Treaty of Amasya was re-established. While they were occupied with the Safavid wars, an ongoing revolt of the local Zaydi Shi'ites of Yemen finally forced the Ottomans to abandon that province in 1636. The province of Lahsa in eastern Arabia also suffered from perpetual rebellion and tribal resistance to Ottoman rule, and was abandoned in 1670.

From 1645 onward the Ottomans were preoccupied with the difficult conquest of Crete from the Republic of Venice. The island was quickly overrun, but Venetian naval superiority enabled the fortress of Candia (modern Heraklion) to resist for decades. Sustained expansion in Europe was resumed in the second half of the seventeenth century, under the aegis of the famous Köprülü grand viziers. The rebellious vassal principality of Transylvania was subdued with the conquests of Ineu (Yanova, 1658) and Oradea (Varad, 1660). War with the Habsburgs in 1663-4 led to the recovery of Novigrad and the conquest of Nové Zámky (Uyvar, 1663). The conquest of Crete was finally completed in 1669 with the fall of Candia. In that same year, the Ottomans accepted the offer of the Cossack state of Right-Bank Ukraine to become an Ottoman vassal in exchange for protection from the Polish–Lithuanian Commonwealth and Russia. This led to war in 1672–76, as the Ottomans conquered Podolia (Kamaniçe) from the Commonwealth, and to war with Russia in 1676–81, in which Russian garrisons were evicted from Cossack lands. Ottoman rule in Europe reached its greatest extent in 1682, when anti-Habsburg Hungarian rebel leader Imre Thököly pledged allegiance to the Ottoman Empire, accepting the title "King of Middle Hungary" (Ottoman Turkish: Orta Macar). Just as the vassalization of Right-Bank Ukraine had led to the Kamaniçe campaign, so too did the vassalization of Imre Thököly lead directly to the 1683 Vienna Campaign.

After the unsuccessful Siege of Vienna in 1683, the coalition forces of the Holy League began to push the Ottomans out of Hungary, with most of the country having fallen by 1688. In the Treaty of Karlowitz the Ottomans accepted this loss as well as the return of Podolia to the Polish-Lithuanian Commonwealth. While Crete remained in Ottoman hands, Morea was ceded to Venice along with most of Dalmatia. This was the first major instance of Ottoman territorial retreat in Europe, and it prompted the adoption of a defensive military policy along the Danube river during the eighteenth century.

Ottoman territorial evolution during the Era of Transformation

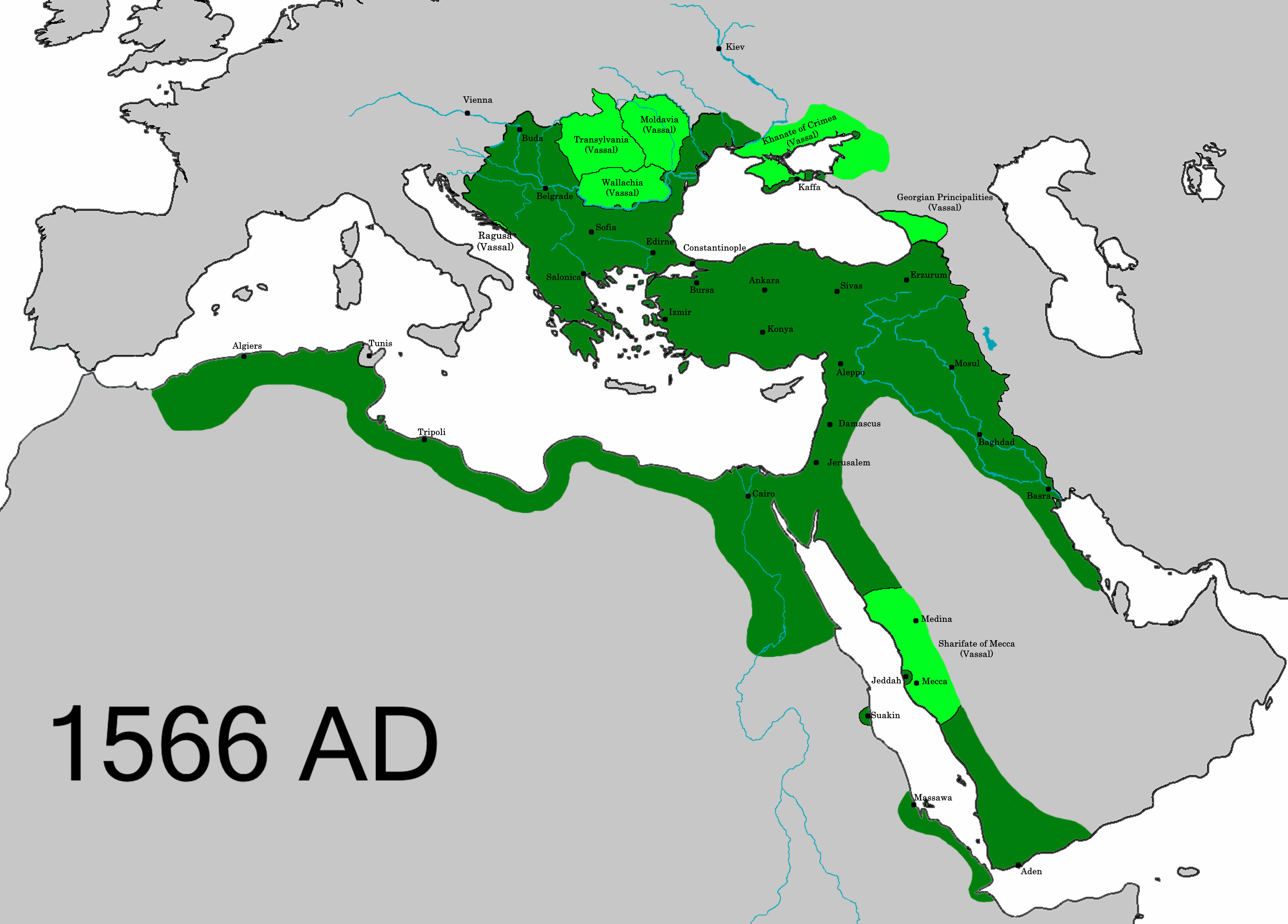

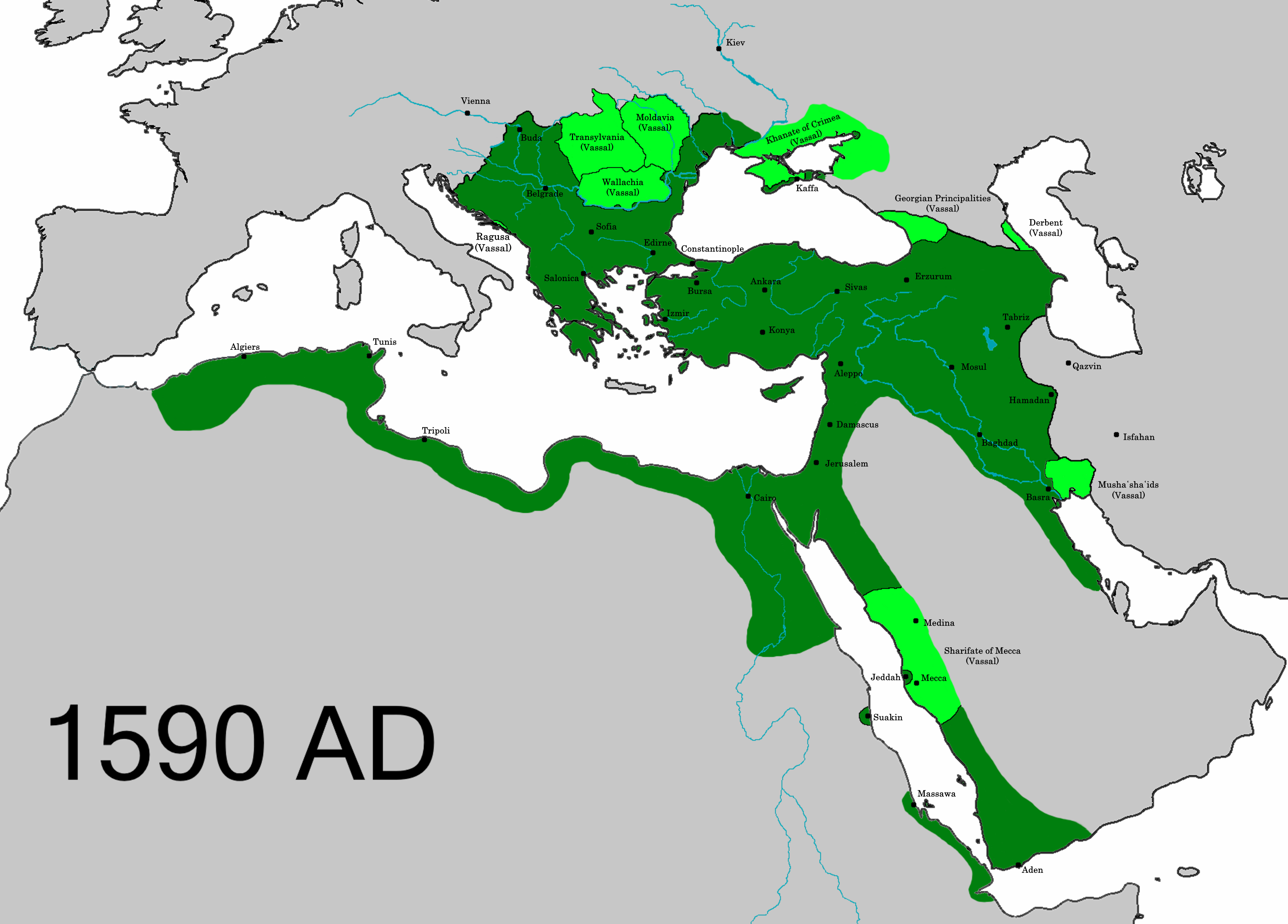

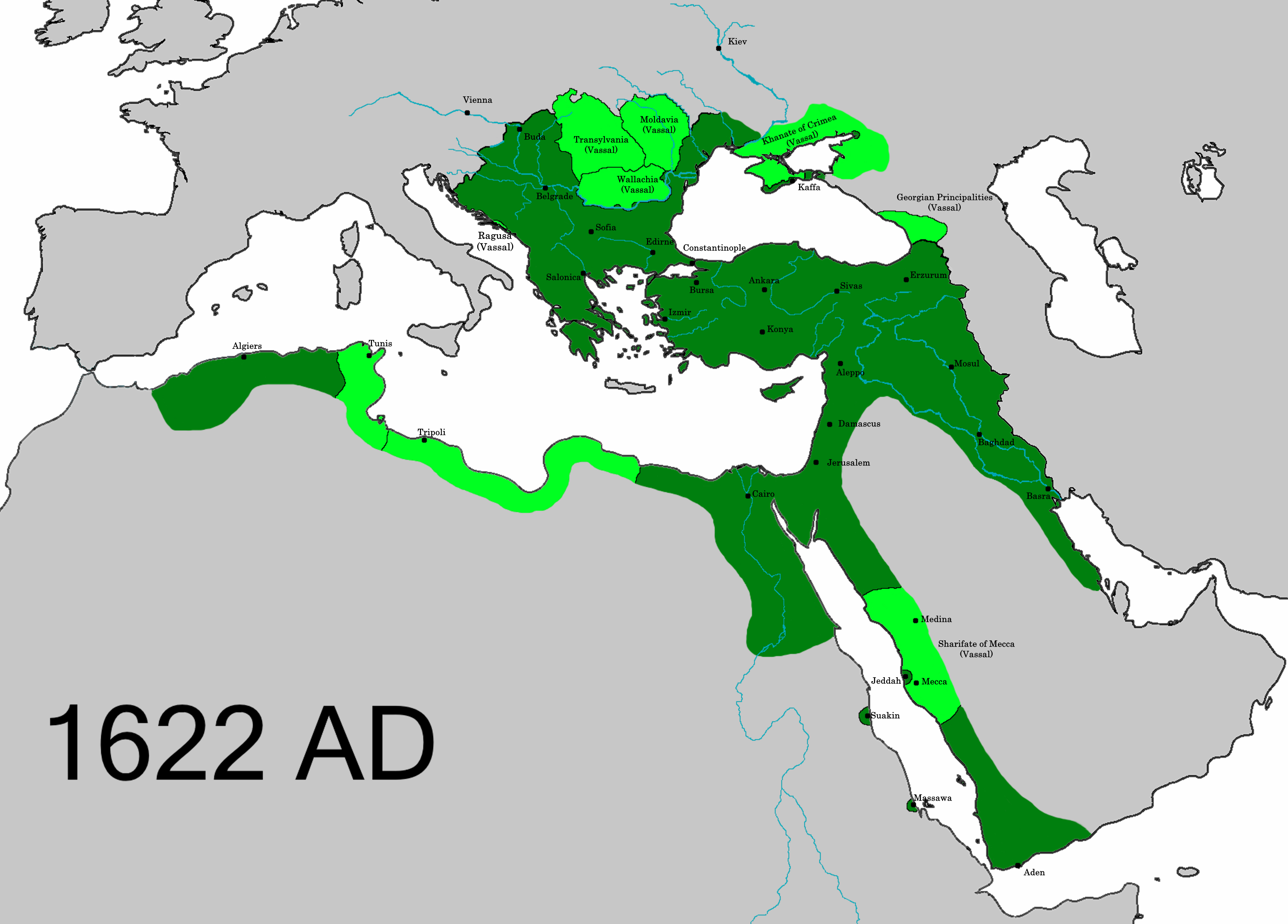

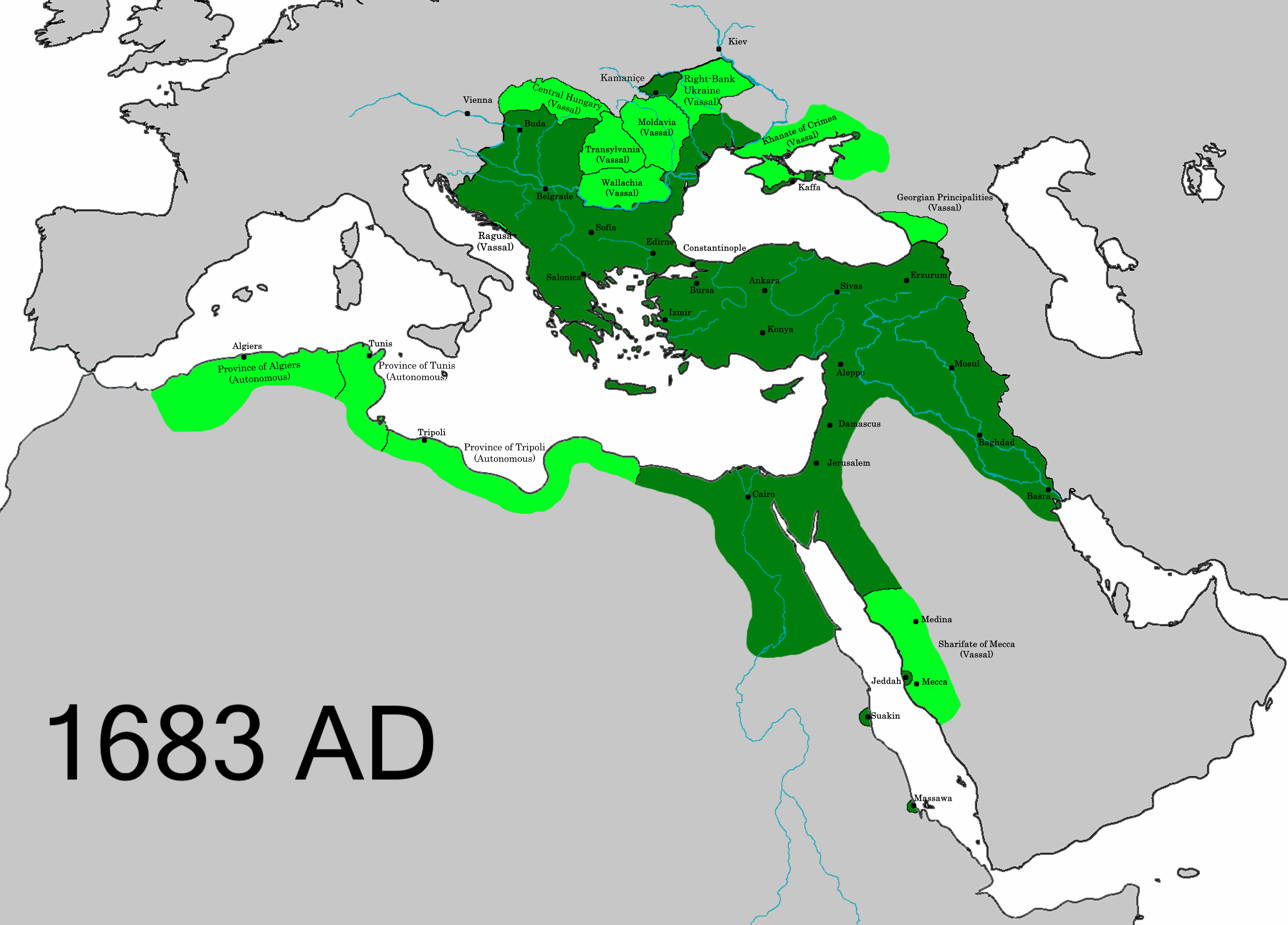

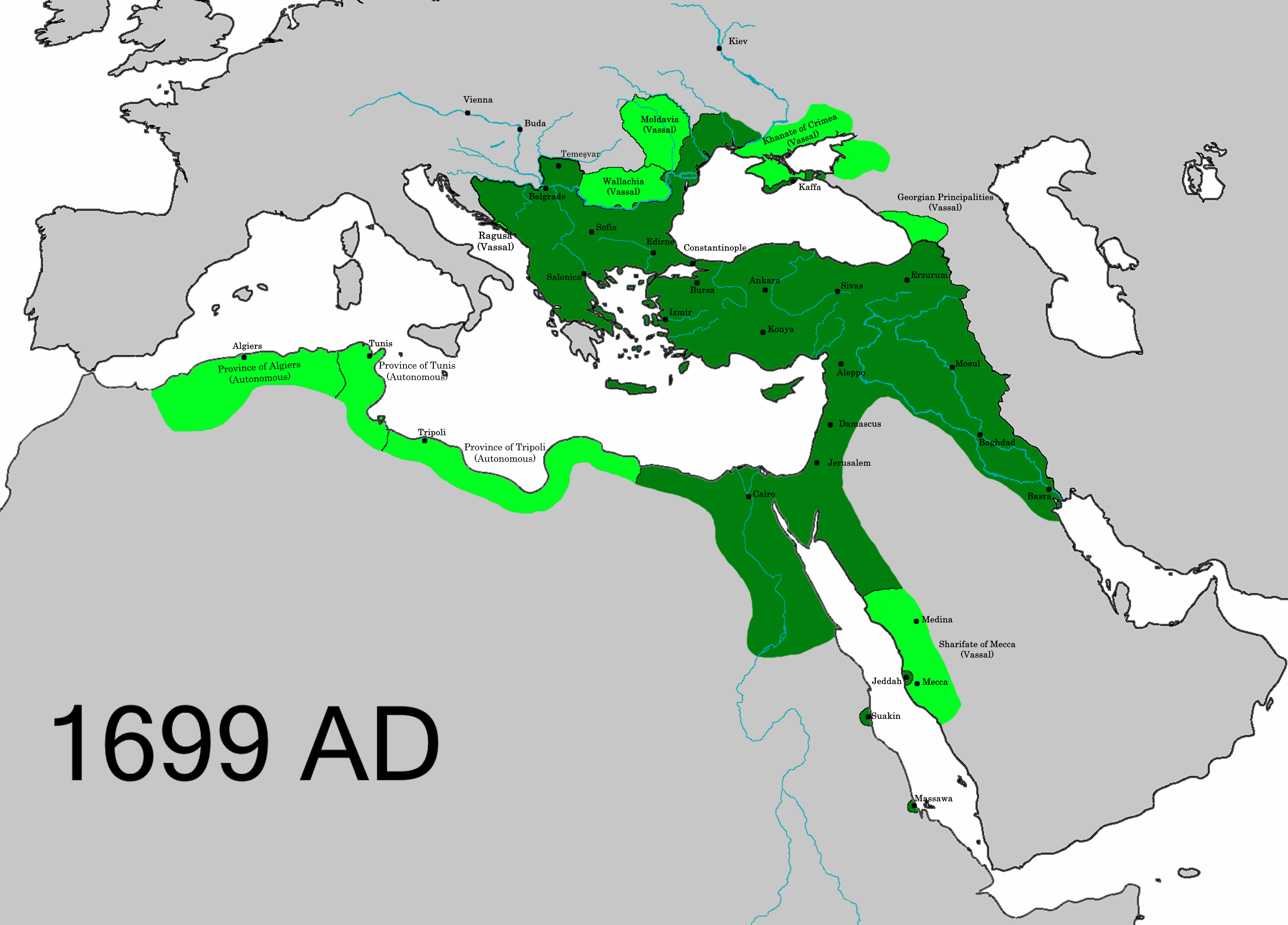

=== Subject states ===
In addition to territory under direct imperial administration, the Ottoman Empire also possessed varying degrees of sovereignty over its many vassal states. Each vassal state's relationship with the empire was unique, but typically involved the payment of tribute, military contribution, or both. Such vassals included the Danubian Principalities of Wallachia and Moldavia, the Crimean Khanate, the Principality of Transylvania, the Republic of Ragusa, various Georgian and Caucasian principalities, and, in the second half of the seventeenth century, the Cossack state of Right-Bank Ukraine and the territory ruled by Imre Thököly, known as Middle Hungary. The Sharifs of Mecca in western Arabia were also subject to the Ottomans, but neither paid tribute nor offered military forces. At times, the empire also received tribute from Venice, Habsburg Austria, Poland–Lithuania, and Russia, which made them vassals of the Ottoman Empire in theory, if not in practice. The empire's territory also included many smaller and often geographically isolated regions where the state's authority was weak, and local groups could exercise significant degrees of autonomy or even de facto independence. Examples include the highlands of Yemen, the area of Mount Lebanon, mountainous regions of the Balkans such as Montenegro, and much of Kurdistan, where pre-Ottoman dynasties continued to rule under Ottoman authority.

== Demography ==
Due to scarcity of records and the tendency to record the number of households rather than individuals in taxation surveys, it is very difficult to determine with accuracy the population level in the Ottoman Empire. Thus rather than definite numbers, historians are more apt to demonstrate trends in population increase and decrease from region to region. It is known that the Balkans and Anatolia, like Europe, experienced a rapid increase in population over the course of the sixteenth century, increasing by roughly 60% in the period 1520–80. This growth led to population pressure in Anatolia, as the land could no longer adequately support the peasant population. Many landless peasants took up banditry as a way to make a living, or were recruited into the armies of roving Celali rebels. Controlling the bandits' activities became a major policy issue for the Ottomans, as bandit raids only worsened the agricultural situation in Anatolia. One method of control involved their recruitment into the Ottoman army as musketeers, known as sekban and sarıca. Other methods were tried as well, such as the dispatch of an inspection team in 1659, which confiscated 80,000 illegally held firearms. Following the dramatic demographic growth of the sixteenth century, the seventeenth century population was mostly stable and in some regions even declined, again relatively consistent with general European trends.

The empire's premier city was Kostantiniyye (modern day Istanbul), with a population of upwards of 250 thousand in the middle of the sixteenth century. Other estimates place it even higher, between 500 thousand and one million inhabitants. Second in size was Cairo, with approximately 400 thousand inhabitants in the year 1660. Most other major urban centers did not even approach this size. İzmir grew from a small town into a major center of international trade, with 90 thousand inhabitants in the mid-seventeenth century, while the Syrian city of Aleppo also grew from approximately 46 thousand in 1580 to 115 thousand a century later. Bursa, the main city of northwestern Anatolia and a major center for the production of silk textiles, had a population which ranged between 20 and 40 thousand over the course of the seventeenth century. Urban expansion was not universal. In the early seventeenth century, many of the cities and towns of inner Anatolia and the Black Sea coast suffered from the raiding and banditry of the Celali rebellions and Cossack raids, such as Ankara, Tokat, and Sinop.

In Ottoman Europe this period witnessed a major shift in religious demographics. Many of the cities and towns of the Balkans and Hungary became majority Muslim, including Buda, the former capital of the Kingdom of Hungary. In the Balkan countryside the rate of conversion to Islam gradually increased until reaching a peak in the late seventeenth century, particularly affecting regions such as Albania, Macedonia, Crete and Bulgaria.

== Economy ==
Perhaps the most significant economic transformation of this period was the monetization of the economy and subsequent transformation of the feudal timar system. Over the course of the sixteenth century, coinage came to play a much larger role in the Ottoman rural economy, with tax payments in cash coming to replace payments in kind. As the Ottoman population expanded, the volume of trade grew and new regional markets appeared across the empire. The timar system, which had been designed to take advantage of the smaller scale of the economy in previous centuries, was thus rendered obsolete. Timar fiefs, which were once used to support provincial cavalry forces, were increasingly confiscated by the central government to serve other purposes, a process which has been described as "modernization."

=== Budget ===
Ottoman budget, 1669–70
	Amount (in akçe)	Percentage
Standing army salaries	217.4 million	35.5%
Palace expenses (Note: Palace expenses included not only money set aside for the sultan's personal upkeep, but also the maintenance of the vast imperial household, the palace school, and many of the diplomatic expenses of the empire. The palace carried out functions which could be classified as civil administration.)	189.2 million	31%
Misc. military expenses	125.5 million	20.5%
Naval arsenal	41.3 million	6.7%
Construction projects	~12 million	~2%
Hajj expenses	3.5 million	0.6%
Misc.	~23.4 million	~3.7%
Total expenses	612.3 million	100%
Income	567.6 million	-
Balance	−44.7 million	−7.3%

At the end of each year the Ottoman government produced a comprehensive balance-sheet depicting its revenues and expenses, giving historians a window through which to view their finances. Ottoman government income grew from 183 million akçe in 1560 to 581 million in 1660, an increase of 217%. However, this growth did not keep pace with inflation, and consequently the Ottomans experienced budgetary deficits throughout most of the seventeenth century, by an average of 14% but with much wider margins during wartime. The province of Egypt played a major role in making up the difference. Each year, after covering local expenses, that province submitted its surplus revenue directly to Istanbul. Egypt was particularly rich, and it provided approximately 72 million akçe annually, allowing the central government to meet its financial obligations. By the end of the seventeenth century, and largely a result of reforms carried out during the War of the Holy League, the central government's income had grown to 1 billion akçe, and continued to grow at an even more dramatic pace during the following period, now far outstripping inflation.

=== Coinage ===
Monetization of the economy coincided with the Price Revolution, a period of inflation affecting both Europe and the Middle East during the sixteenth century. As a result, the value of the main Ottoman silver coin (akçe) became unstable, particularly after a severe debasement in 1585. The currency's instability lasted until the middle of the seventeenth century and led some regions of the empire to import counterfeit European coins for everyday use. This situation was brought under control in the 1690s when the empire carried out far-reaching monetary reforms and issued a new silver and copper currency.

=== Trade ===
Cairo, as a major entrepôt for the Red Sea trade, benefited from the emergence of Yemeni coffee as a major trading good. By the end of the sixteenth century coffeehouses had emerged in cities and towns across the empire, and the drink became a major item of public consumption. By the end of the seventeenth century approximately 4–5,000 tons of coffee was being imported into Cairo annually, much of it exported to the rest of the empire.

Trade along the maritime routes of the Black Sea was severely disrupted from the late sixteenth century by the extensive raiding activity of the Zaporozhian Cossacks, who attacked towns along the Anatolian and Bulgarian coasts, and even established bases in the mouth of the Danube in order to plunder its shipping. Likewise, merchant vessels at sea frequently became targets for the Cossacks. After the outbreak of the Khmelnytsky Rebellion in 1648 Cossack activity reduced in intensity, but remained an issue of critical importance for the Ottoman government.

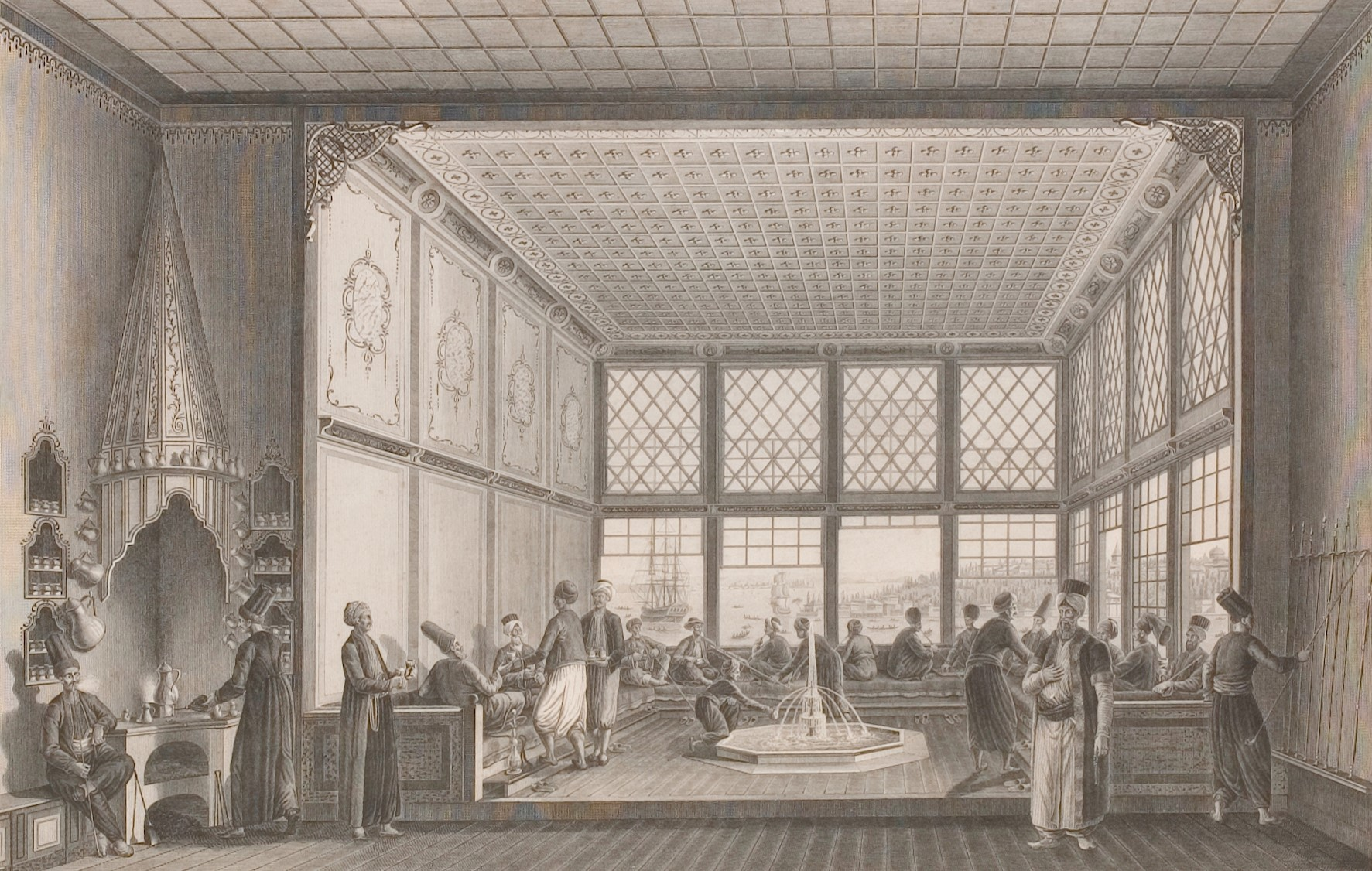
An Ottoman coffeehouse in Istanbul.

==== European merchants ====
European merchants active in the Ottoman Empire are by far the most highly studied aspect of Ottoman commerce, a fact which has frequently caused their importance to be exaggerated. European merchants were by no means dominant in the empire during this period, and far from imposing their will upon the Ottomans, they were required to accommodate themselves to the terms which the Ottomans set for them. These terms were defined in a series of trade agreements known as the "capitulations" (Ottoman Turkish: ʿahdnāme), (Note: The term "capitulation" comes from the Latin "capitulum", referring to a chapter heading, and did not have the connotation of "surrendering" as does the modern English word.) which granted Europeans the right to establish mercantile communities in specified Ottoman ports and to pay a lower rate of tariff on their goods. European communities were exempt from regular taxation and were given judicial autonomy with regard to personal and family issues. All commercial disputes were to be settled in the empire's Sharia courts, until the 1670s when they were granted the right to appeal major cases directly to Istanbul, where they could be argued by their resident ambassadors. Capitulations were granted first to the French (1569), then the English (1580), and finally to the Dutch (1612). The arrival of Western European traders in the Levant, dubbed the "Northern Invasion", did not result in their takeover or domination of Mediterranean commerce, but it did usher in certain changes. Venice in particular suffered from heavy competition, and its commercial presence declined significantly, particularly after 1645, when the Ottomans and Venetians went to war over Crete. The English were by far the most successful European merchants in the empire during the seventeenth century, and they benefited from friendly relations between the two states. The Ottomans exported raw silk and imported cheap woolen cloth, as well as tin necessary for the production of military armaments.

== Government ==
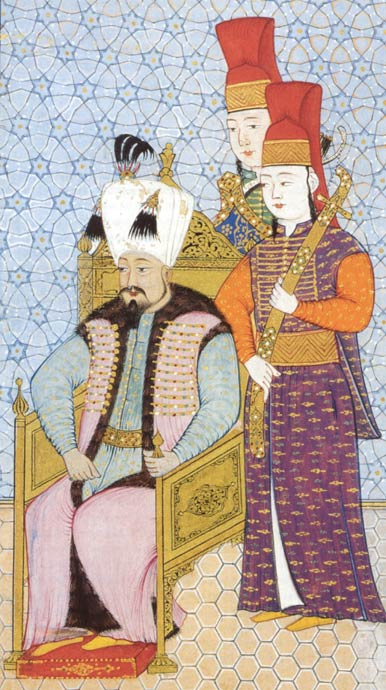
Mehmed IV (r. 1648–1687), the longest reigning sultan of the seventeenth century.

While in 1550 the Ottoman Empire was a patrimonial state in which all power was held exclusively by the sultan, by 1700 it had experienced a political transformation whereby the sultan's monopoly on power was replaced with a multi-polar system in which political power was informally shared among many different individuals and factions. This process came about gradually, and was not unopposed. Certain rulers, such as Osman II and Murad IV, sought to reverse this trend and re-establish absolute power for themselves. For his efforts, Osman II became the victim of regicide in 1622, the significance of which one historian has compared to the 1649 regicide of Charles I of England.

Significant in this process of transformation were several changes in the nature of succession to the throne. At the outset of this period, Ottoman princes took up posts in the Anatolian provincial government upon reaching the age of maturity. However, Mehmed III (r. 1595–1603) died before any of his sons came of age. Ahmed I was thus enthroned as a minor, and subsequently princes were no longer sent to the provinces to govern. While the motivation behind this change cannot be known for certain, it may have been a method of preventing the type of fratricidal civil war experienced in the last years of the reign of Suleiman the Magnificent. Just as princely government was abandoned, so too did the practice of royal fratricide, which had been enforced since the time of Mehmed II, fall out of use. This seems to have been a reaction to the unusually gruesome fratricides occasioned by the enthronements of Murad III and Mehmed III, in which dozens of infants and young boys were killed. The result was that the whole imperial family collectively remained in Istanbul, and sultans allowed their brothers to live in the harem undisturbed. The ultimate consequence of this was a change in the order of succession; upon his death in 1617 Ahmed I was succeeded not by one of his sons, but by his brother Mustafa I. Henceforth the general principle of Ottoman succession would be that of seniority rather than patrilineality. However, in practice this meant that sovereignty came to be viewed as something vested in the Ottoman dynasty as a whole rather than in a particular member, making the individual sultan replaceable.

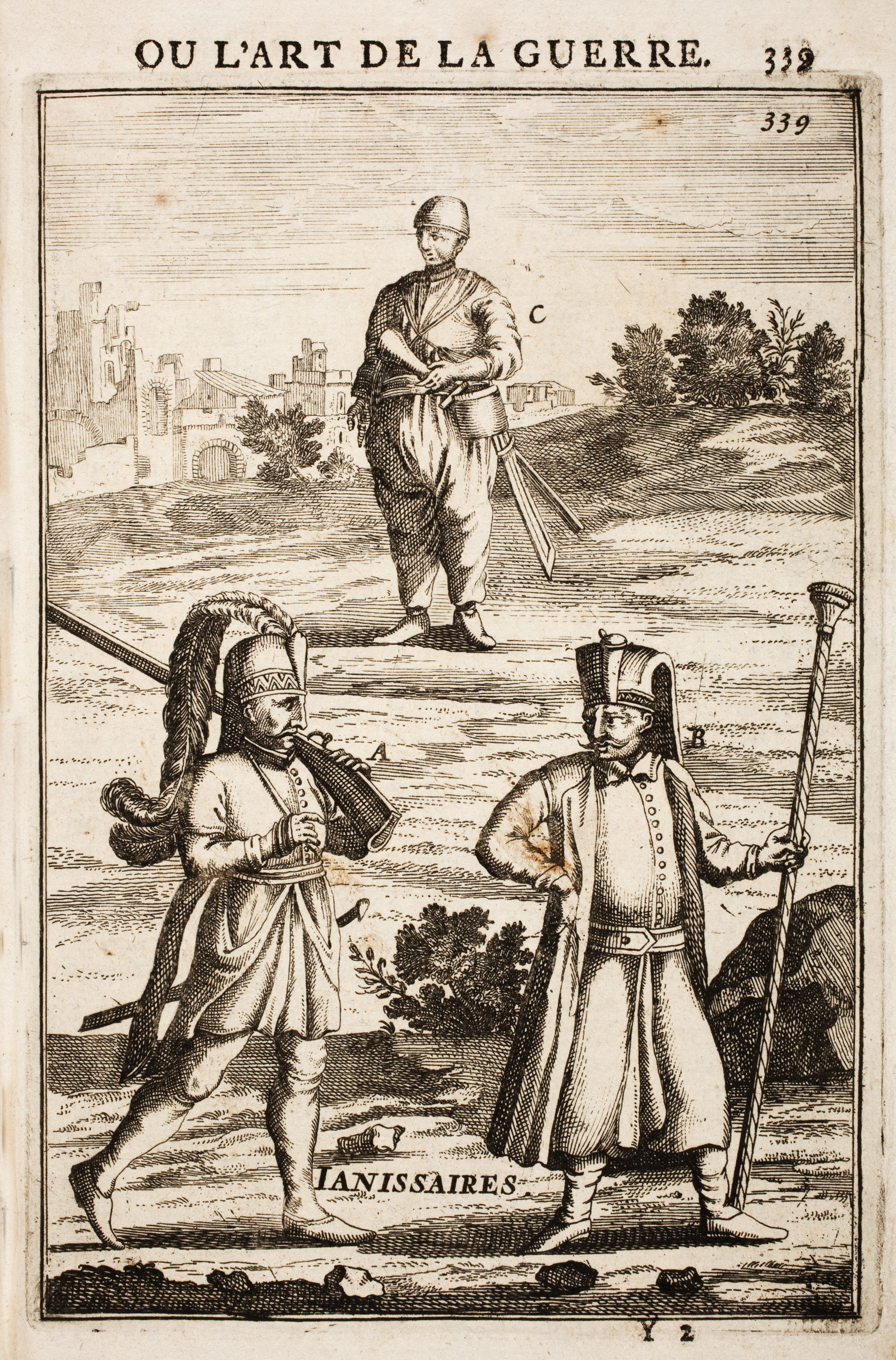
A seventeenth-century European depiction of several janissaries.

The existence of multiple adult males of the Ottoman dynasty facilitated the emergence of other centers of power within the government. Two figures of particular importance were the Şeyhülislâm, or chief of the Islamic religious hierarchy, and the Valide Sultan, or Queen Mother. These two figures were able to sanction the deposition and enthronement of sultans, the former as the empire's highest religious and judicial authority, and the latter as the matriarch of the dynasty. They thus came to wield immense power, as any governmental faction seeking to control the policy of the empire required their support. Two Valide Sultans in particular dominated the seventeenth century: Kösem Sultan, mother of Murad IV and Ibrahim I, and Turhan Hatice, mother of Mehmed IV. Several sultans during this period occupied the throne while still children, and it was in their roles as regents that the Valide Sultans could become the most powerful figures in the empire.

Another locus of power was the ever-expanding imperial army, consisting of the Janissaries and Imperial Cavalry. The size of these organizations increased dramatically in the second half of the sixteenth century, with the number of janissaries increasing from 7,886 in 1527 to 39,282 in 1609. While many of these men went on to serve in the empire's foreign wars, others were janissaries only on paper, benefiting from the status they received as members of the corps but otherwise avoiding the obligation to serve in war. Such men connected the Janissary Corps with the common people, giving them a voice in politics. Protests, mutinies, and rebellions allowed the Janissaries to express their disapproval of imperial policy, and they frequently played a role in forming political coalitions within the Ottoman government. The Janissaries thus transformed from an elite fighting force into a complex hybrid organization, part military and part socio-political association, maintaining an important influence over Ottoman government in spite of attempts by heavy-handed rulers to suppress them over the course of the seventeenth century.

The Ottoman sultans began to gradually move away from direct Roman legitimization as the Sunni Muslim majority grew following the expansions in the first half of the 16th century and they started to use Roman imperial titles like sar/çar (tsar) or imperator to refer to the Holy Roman Emperors and Russian Tsars which fell out of use for the Ottoman sultans by that time.

=== Political households ===
Another major development was the proliferation of so-called "vizier and pasha households" (kapı) among the political elite of the empire. The premier household in the empire was the sultan's imperial household in Istanbul, which the elite sought to emulate. Wealthy governors assembled large retinues of servants as well as private armies, forming connections of political patronage with one another. The formation of households coincided with a general increase in the wealth and power of the empire's highest-ranking provincial officials, which proved to be a mixed blessing for the central government: while the governors used their power to centralize imperial control and assemble larger armies to combat the Ottoman Empire's enemies, they also constituted more formidable foes in times of rebellion. The most successful elite household was established by the grand vizier Köprülü Mehmed Pasha (1656–1661), who used it to dominate the empire during his tenure in office, placing loyal men from his household in positions of power and authority. Men raised in the Köprülü household continued to occupy important positions in the Ottoman government well into the early eighteenth century.

=== Bureaucracy ===
The Ottoman bureaucracy (mālīye) expanded dramatically both with regard to size and range of activity. While only 38 salaried scribes were serving in 1549, by 1593 this number had increased to 183. As the Timar system was phased out of use, tax revenues which had once been distributed locally to the empire's army of feudal cavalry were now remitted to Istanbul, either through direct collection (emānet) or through tax farming (iltizām). A larger bureaucracy was thus needed in order to cope with the empire's increasingly centralized fiscal system. Bureaucratic organization was diversified, with new branches being formed and scribal duties increasingly specialized. The high quality of the Ottoman bureaucracy was underpinned by stringent standards of scribal recruitment. By the early seventeenth century the bureaucracy was moved out of its original location in Topkapı Palace, indicating that it was becoming independent of the sultan's household. It thus became a stabilizing influence for the empire; while sultans and viziers rose and fell, the bureaucracy remained in place, providing cohesion and continuity to imperial administration.

== Military ==
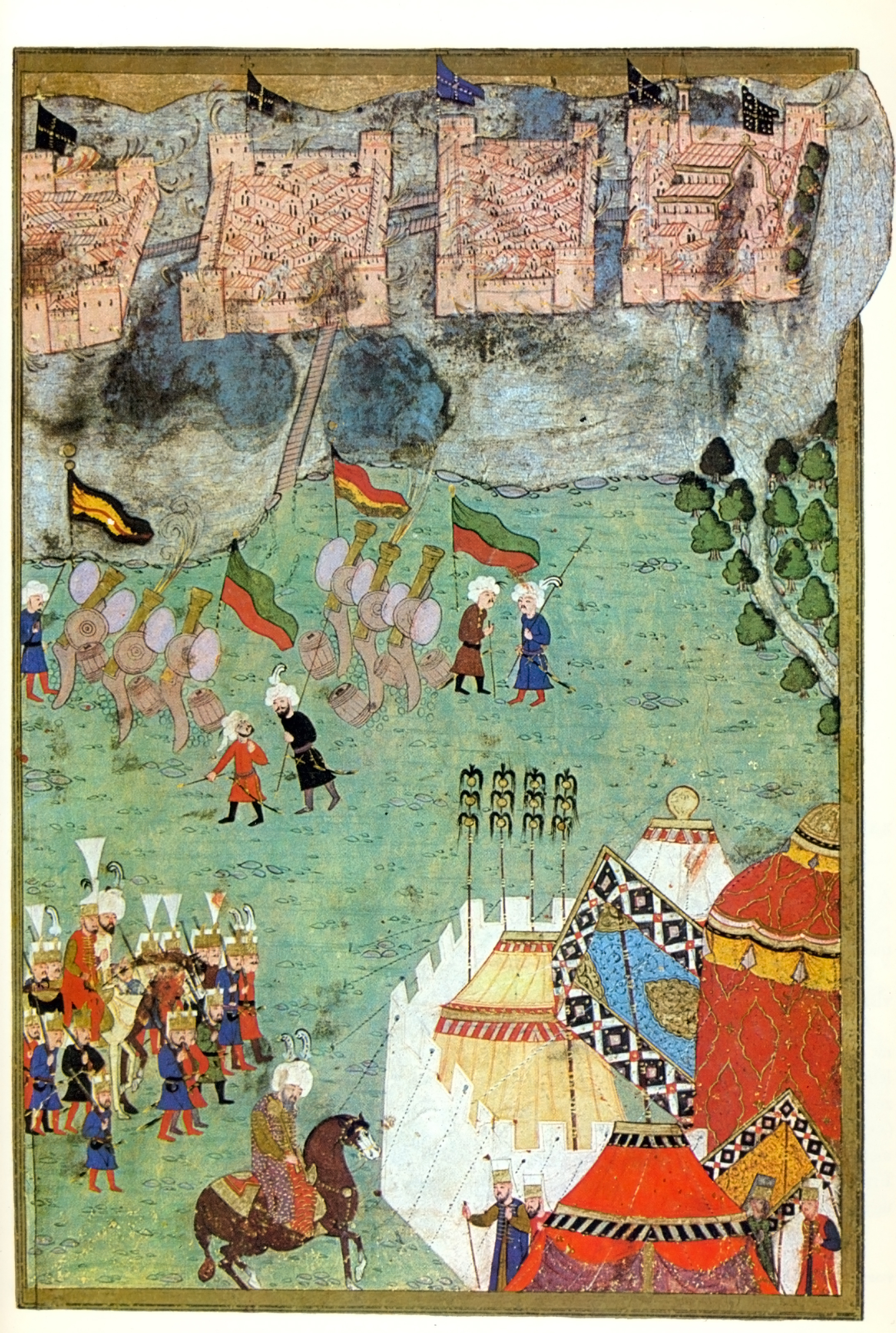
Ottoman miniature showing Szigetvár before the siege, 16th century

The nature of the Ottoman military shifted dramatically during this period. From its inception the Ottoman army was dominated by cavalry forces, with cavalry outnumbering infantry in the sixteenth century on a 3:1 or 4:1 basis. As a result of the empire's rapid expansion and the stabilization of its borders in the preceding period, as well as the increasing importance of gunpowder technology to military success, the empire adapted by widening the range of its recruitment in order to raise much larger numbers of infantry troops. By the 1690s, the infantry proportion of the field army had increased to 50–60 percent, equivalent to that of the neighboring Habsburg monarchy. Calculations of total strength during this period remain unreliable, but it has been estimated that the average Ottoman army consisted of a core force of approximately 65,000–70,000 men from the timariots and standing army, joined also by irregular militias and the armies of the empire's vassals, with a particularly significant contribution coming from the Crimean Khanate. In general, the Ottoman army remained at least as effective as those of its European rivals throughout this period. In contrast with older historical views, which posited a failure to keep pace with European military developments, the Ottomans in fact demonstrated a significant degree of dynamism and a continued capacity and willingness to innovate and improve their military forces. Although the empire experienced significant defeats and territorial loss in the 1683–99 War of the Holy League, this was caused not by military inferiority, but by the size and effective coordination of the Christian coalition, as well as the logistical challenges of warfare on multiple fronts.

=== Standing army ===
The Ottoman standing army (ḳapukulu), also referred to as the "central army", consisted of three main divisions: the infantry, known as the Janissary corps, the cavalry (sipahi) corps, known as the Six Regiments (Altı Bölük), and the Artillery corps. Unlike the provincial army, the standing army was based in Istanbul and was subject to regular training and discipline, and was paid quarterly in cash salaries. The size of the army expanded dramatically beginning from the second half of the sixteenth century, more than doubling from 29,175 men in 1574 to 75,868 in 1609. Following this growth its numbers remained relatively stable for the rest of the century. The payment of salaries to the standing army was by far the largest single expense in the imperial budget, and this growth in size was paired with a proportional growth in expenditures. By the seventeenth century the cost of the standing army could at times absorb more than half of the empire's entire central budget. As the army grew the nature of its relationship with the government began to shift, as the janissaries and cavalry increasingly became involved in imperial politics and administration.

=== Logistics ===
The Ottomans possessed a distinct superiority in logistical organization over their European rivals, who were typically forced to resort to ad hoc solutions or even outright plunder in order to keep their armies in good supply. State centralization allowed the Ottomans to maintain a sophisticated system of waystations (Ottoman Turkish: menzil) across the empire, stocked with provisions for the army along their route of march. Border fortresses contained depots which could supply the army once it arrived at the frontier. This enabled the Ottoman army to largely, though not entirely, avoid having to live off the land through plunder.

=== Border defense ===
==== Hungary ====
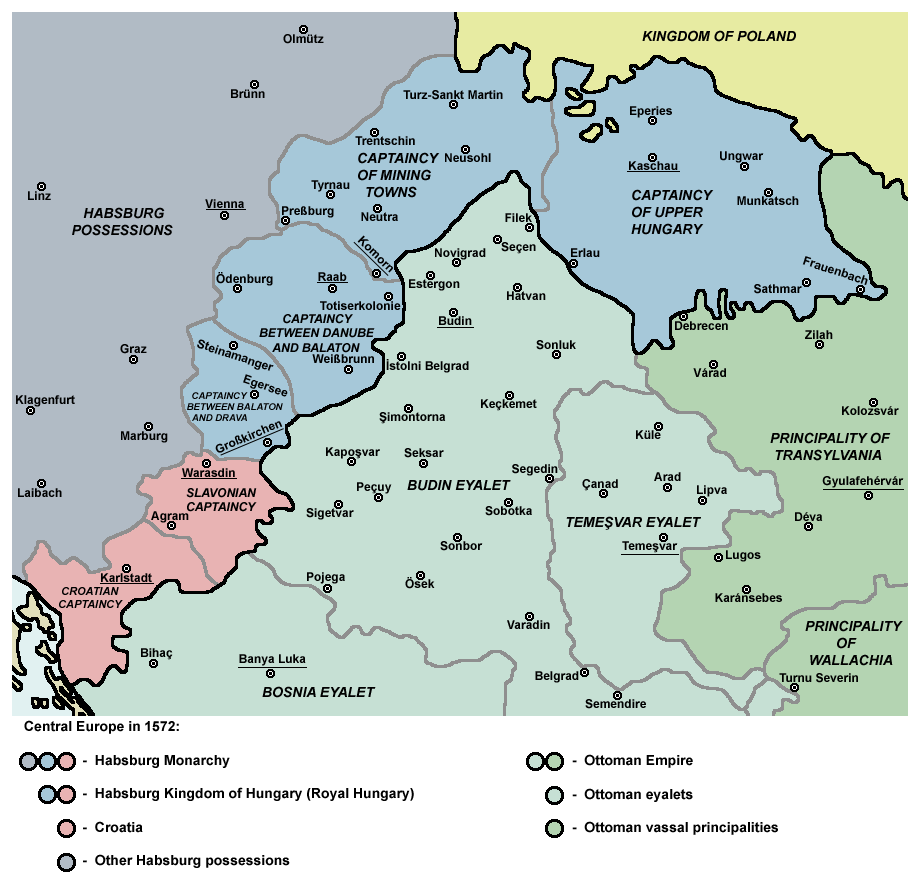
The Ottoman frontier in Hungary in 1572.

In Hungary the Ottomans were primarily concerned with ensuring the security of Buda and the Danube river, which served as a critical transport route for munitions and provisions. For this purpose they constructed several fortresses along the route of the river and surrounded Buda with a ring of protective fortresses, the most significant of which was Esztergom (Estergon), which was significantly enlarged and fortified subsequent to its capture in 1543. Buda's protective ring was completed in 1596 with the conquest of Eger (Eğri) to the northeast. Subsequent to the Peace of Zsitvatorok in 1606 the pace of Ottoman fortress construction slowed as the military threat of the Habsburgs receded.

By the mid-seventeenth century Ottoman Hungary contained approximately 130 fortresses of varying size and strength, ranging from small castles of less than a hundred men to major strongholds with garrisons in the thousands. The most heavily manned were those on the border, while interior forts often contained no more than a token garrison. During the seventeenth century, Buda's garrison ranged from a low of 2,361 in the peaceful years after Zsitvatorok to a high of 5,697 during the third quarter of the century when war with the Habsburgs again resumed. By the 1660s, the total number of men serving in Hungarian garrisons reached as high as 24,000, split between some 17,450 local troops and 6,500 janissaries. These forces were supplemented by local timariots as well as the private armies of Ottoman governors. These numbers, however, constitute wartime levels. During peacetime the garrison sizes would frequently be reduced in order to cut costs. While in the second half of the sixteenth century the Hungarian fortress network was financially self-sufficient, and the local governors were even able to remit surplus revenue to Istanbul, this had deteriorated by the seventeenth century such that the administrative border of the province of Buda needed to be extended south of the Danube in order to increase its available revenue. Nevertheless, the Ottoman financial system was in better shape than that of the Habsburgs, who continually struggled to raise the revenue needed to maintain their own Military Frontier.

Aside from periods of open warfare (1541–68, 1593–1606, 1660–4, 1683–99), the Ottoman-Habsburg frontier in Hungary was characterized by local skirmishes and small-scale conflict known as the "little war" (German: Kleinkrieg). In the absence of the imperial army, command was entrusted to the governor of Buda, who could wield significant provincial forces in the defense of the frontier. Local military ventures could occasionally lead to escalation, as in 1592-3 when the Long War was provoked by the Ottoman governor of Bosnia's conquest of Bihać.

==== Northern frontier ====
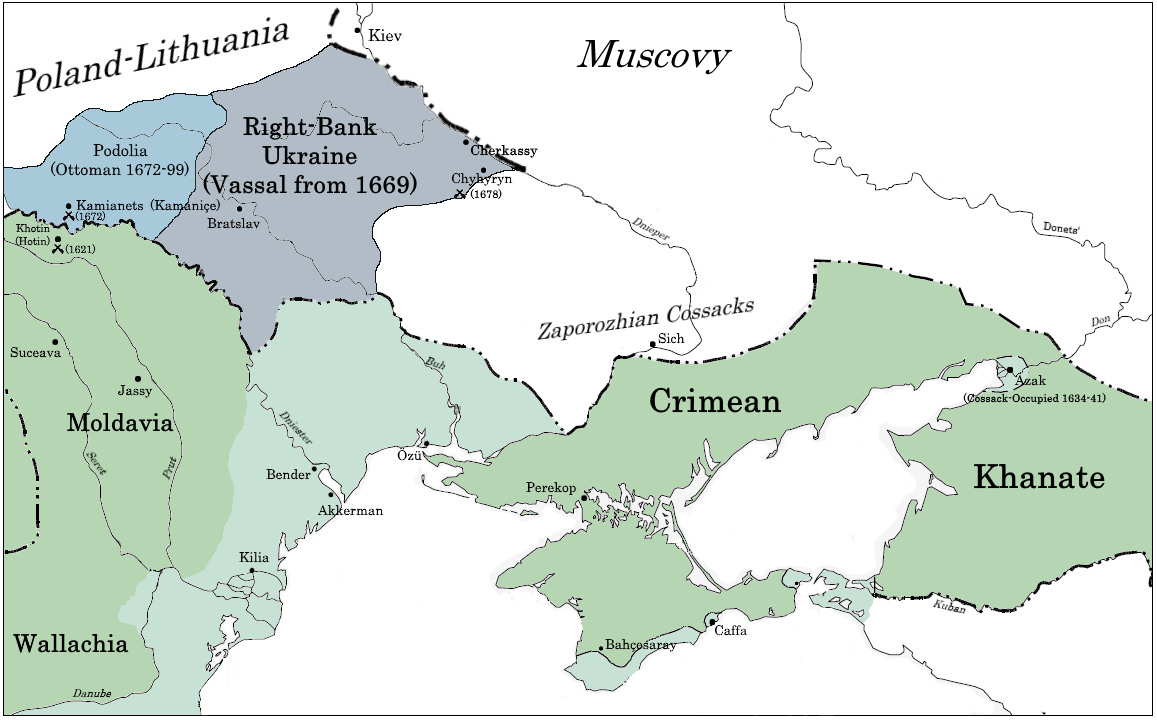
The Ottoman northern frontier in the seventeenth century.

In contrast with their Hungarian and Safavid frontiers, the Ottomans generally did not seek to expand further north from the Black Sea, being concerned primarily with its defense and the security of its sea lanes. The Ottomans maintained a series of fortresses along the Black Sea's northern shore, in the territory of modern Ukraine. Major sites were located in Akkerman, Özü, and Azak. Also of critical importance for the northern frontier was the Ottoman vassal state of the Crimean Khanate, a major power in its own right, which frequently engaged in raiding activity against the Ottomans' northern neighbors the Polish–Lithuanian Commonwealth and Russia. Crimean raiding created a flourishing slave trade through the port of Caffa, directly administered by the Ottomans, but also created perpetual tension between the Ottomans and their neighbors.

The security of the Ottomans' northern frontier was first threatened at the end of the sixteenth century with the emergence of the Zaporozhian Cossacks as a military and political force on the Dnieper river. Theoretically under the sovereignty of the Polish-Lithuanian Commonwealth, the Cossacks used riverboats to enter the Black Sea and launch raids on the Ottoman coastline, becoming marauders and slavers in a manner roughly analogous to the raids of the Crimean Tatars. The Ottomans had long since suppressed all piracy in the Black Sea, the ports of which they entirely controlled, and were thus completely unprepared for the irruption of the Cossacks. By 1614 they were targeting the northern shore of Anatolia, where major towns were sacked and burned, including Sinop, Samsun, and Trabzon. Ottoman exasperation over the Cossack problem resulted in worsening relations with the Commonwealth, and the two countries went to war in 1621 and very nearly again in 1634 and 1646. Countermeasures were developed in order to limit the damage the Cossacks could cause; by the 1620s the Ottomans had established tighter control over the mouth of the Dnieper, preventing large flotillas from passing into the sea, and naval squadrons were established to patrol for raiders.

The Commonwealth had little ability to control the activities of the Cossacks, and in 1648 Ukraine descended into chaos with the Khmelnytsky Uprising, whereby the Cossacks sought to overthrow the control of the Commonwealth and establish an independent state. War continued for nearly twenty years, leading to the intervention of Russia and Sweden, among others. In 1669 Cossack Hetman Petro Doroshenko turned to the Ottomans, offering his state of Right-Bank Ukraine as a vassal in exchange for protection from the Commonwealth and Russia. The Ottomans accepted his offer, seeing this as an opportunity to bring an end to perennial Cossack raiding and to shore up the defenses of the northern frontier. Following a Commonwealth attack on the Cossacks, the Ottomans went to war and in 1672 conquered the fortress of Kamianets-Podilskyi, known to the Ottomans as Kamaniçe. Peace was signed in 1676, whereby the Ottomans annexed the province of Podolia. The Ottomans thus acquired a strong foothold from which to increase their control over the Cossack state, and shortly thereafter established garrisons in the major towns of Ukraine, clashing with the Russians and expelling them from the traditional Cossack capital of Chyhyryn in 1678. Kamaniçe remained the bulwark of the Ottoman northern frontier throughout the War of the Holy League. With a garrison of over 6,000 men and 200 cannons, it was one of the most heavily defended fortresses in the Ottoman Empire. Despite continuous attempts by the Commonwealth to blockade and besiege the city, Kamaniçe managed to hold out throughout the war, and in accordance with the Treaty of Karlowitz was returned to the Commonwealth in 1699 without having been conquered.

=== Navy ===
The Battle of Lepanto, 1571, ended in victory for the European Holy League

Although the Ottoman army remained effective throughout this period, the same cannot be said of the navy. While dominant in the Mediterranean in 1550, the Battle of Lepanto in 1571 resulted in a significant loss of skilled manpower and experienced commanders. The Ottoman Navy went on to conquer Tunis in 1574, but subsequent events shifted imperial attention away from the Mediterranean. The resumption of the Ottoman-Safavid Wars in 1578 and the death of Grand Vizier Sokollu Mehmed Pasha the following year paved the way for a truce with Habsburg Spain in 1580, bringing to an end the imperial wars in the Mediterranean which had characterized the middle of the sixteenth century. The Ottoman navy subsequently fought no maritime war until the outbreak of the Cretan War with Venice in 1645, nearly seventy years later. This period of inaction played a role in weakening the effectiveness of the Ottoman navy, such that the Venetians were able to blockade the Dardanelles and inflict several defeats upon the Ottomans, most significantly in the Battle of the Dardanelles (1656), described as the worst Ottoman defeat since Lepanto. Although these defeats have often been ascribed to an Ottoman failure to modernize their navy through the replacement of oar-propelled galleys with sail-driven galleons, in fact the Ottoman navy contained just as many galleons as that of the Venetians. Rather than innovation or technical ability, what the Ottomans lacked was skilled mariners to crew and command their vessels, whereas the Venetians could draw upon their extensive merchant marine for manpower. In contrast with the sixteenth century, the skilled mariners of the Barbary Coast were less willing to commit themselves to the Ottoman cause. Whereas sixteenth-century Ottoman admirals frequently began their careers as corsairs in North Africa, in the middle of the seventeenth century the admiralty was merely a prestigious office to be held by various statesmen who did not necessarily have any naval experience. Despite these difficulties, the Ottomans were ultimately able to overcome the Venetians, breaking the blockade of the Dardanelles in 1657 and completing the conquest of Crete with the fall of Heraklion in 1669.

Subsequent to the Cretan War, the Ottomans sought to improve the quality of their navy, and particularly its galleons. Investments were made toward improving their technical design, such that by 1675 an English captain could write home with suggestions for altering the design of English ships on the Ottoman model. In 1682 a dedicated squadron of galleons was created, organizationally separate from the fleet's remaining galleys, and in that year alone ten new galleons were commissioned to be built. The Ottomans' next major naval conflict began in 1684, when Venice aligned with Habsburg Austria, Poland–Lithuania, and the Papacy to combat the Ottomans in the War of the Holy League. The Venetians opened a front in the Aegean Sea and Peloponnese, but failed in an attempt to reconquer Crete in 1692. From 1695 to 1701 the Ottoman navy was placed under the command of Mezzo Morto Hüseyin Pasha, an experienced corsair from Algiers, who defeated the Venetian fleet in the Battle of the Oinousses Islands on 9 February 1695 and demonstrated the success of the previous decades' reforms.

== Religious and intellectual life ==
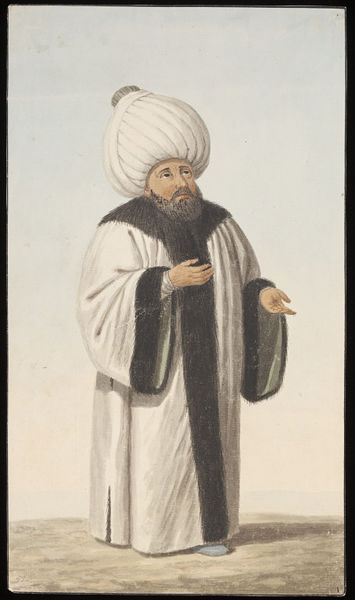
A depiction of a Şeyhülislâm, the chief Islamic religious official of the empire.

The Ottoman Empire of this period was home to a vibrant religious and intellectual life. The legal reforms of Şeyhülislâm Ebussuud Efendi (1545–74) stimulated Ottoman intellectuals to vigorously debate many of society's issues. Ottomans were conflicted over the religious and moral qualities of newly available consumer goods, such as coffee and tobacco, which were sometimes banned and sometimes permitted. Equally divisive was the legality of several religious practices associated with Sufism, which were most staunchly opposed by the fiercely conservative Kadızadelis, a movement which began in the early seventeenth century but traced its origins to the sixteenth century preacher Birgili Mehmed Efendi (d. 1573). Kazıdadeli ideology centered on the Islamic invocation to "enjoin good and forbid wrong," leading them to oppose practices they perceived as "innovation" (bid'ah), in a manner roughly analogous to modern Wahhabism. The Kadızadelis spread their ideology by serving as preachers in Istanbul's major mosques, and twice won the support of the imperial government, first under Murad IV and later under Mehmed IV. Despite this, the Kadızadelis were looked upon with scorn by many of Istanbul's scholars and intellectuals, who ridiculed them for their zealous conservatism. The Kadızadeli preacher Vani Mehmed Efendi acted as a personal spiritual advisor to Mehmed IV, but fell from grace and was banished from court following the unsuccessful Siege of Vienna in 1683. The Kadızadelis henceforth received no direct imperial support.

In the early seventeenth century, Ottoman intellectual life was further influenced by an influx of scholars from Safavid Iran and Kurdistan. These scholars encouraged a revival of the rational sciences through emphasis on 'verification' (Arabic: taḥqīq, as opposed to taqlīd, "imitation") of the scientific discoveries of previous generations. The result was a burst of new written works on rationalist topics, such as mathematics, logic, and dialectics, with many scholars tracing their intellectual lineage back to these Iranian and Kurdish immigrants.

=== Nasihatname ===
This period also witnessed the flowering of the literary genre known as "Advice for Kings" (nasihatname). Literary works of this nature were written to address the struggles which the state was experiencing, and to advise the ruler on how to properly solve them. Advice writers frequently alluded to the reign of Suleiman the Magnificent (1520–1566) as the ideal model which contemporary rulers should seek to emulate. Writers who portrayed the empire as being in decline from a previous golden age were often motivated to do so by class or factional interests, as they often came from or were influenced by groups who had been disenfranchised by the empire's reforms, such as the timariots, or otherwise felt personal indignation toward the state as a result of failing to achieve career advancement, indicating a clear bias in their writings. Historians had once accepted these writers' description of Ottoman decline as fact, and thus portrayed the Ottoman Empire as entering a period of decline after the death of Suleiman the Magnificent, a view which has come to be known as the Ottoman Decline Thesis. However, since the 1980s, due to a re-examination of the nasihatname literature as well as countless other facets of Ottoman civilization, historians have achieved a consensus that in fact no such decline occurred, and thus the notion of the "Decline of the Ottoman Empire" was a myth.

=== Historiography ===
Ottoman historical writing underwent major changes during this period. Particularly after 1600, Ottoman writers shifted away from the Persianate style of previous generations, writing in a form of Turkish prose which was much less ornate in comparison with works produced in the sixteenth century. Ottoman historians came to see themselves as problem-solvers, using their historical knowledge to offer solutions to contemporary issues, and for this they chose to write in a straightforward, easily understood vernacular form of Turkish. Rather than writing solely to buttress the prestige of the Ottoman dynasty, Ottoman historians of the seventeenth century believed in the importance of reporting events in as honest and accurate a manner as was possible. Major historians of this period include Mustafa Âlî, Katib Çelebi, and Mustafa Naima.

== Political narrative ==
=== Suleiman's successors ===
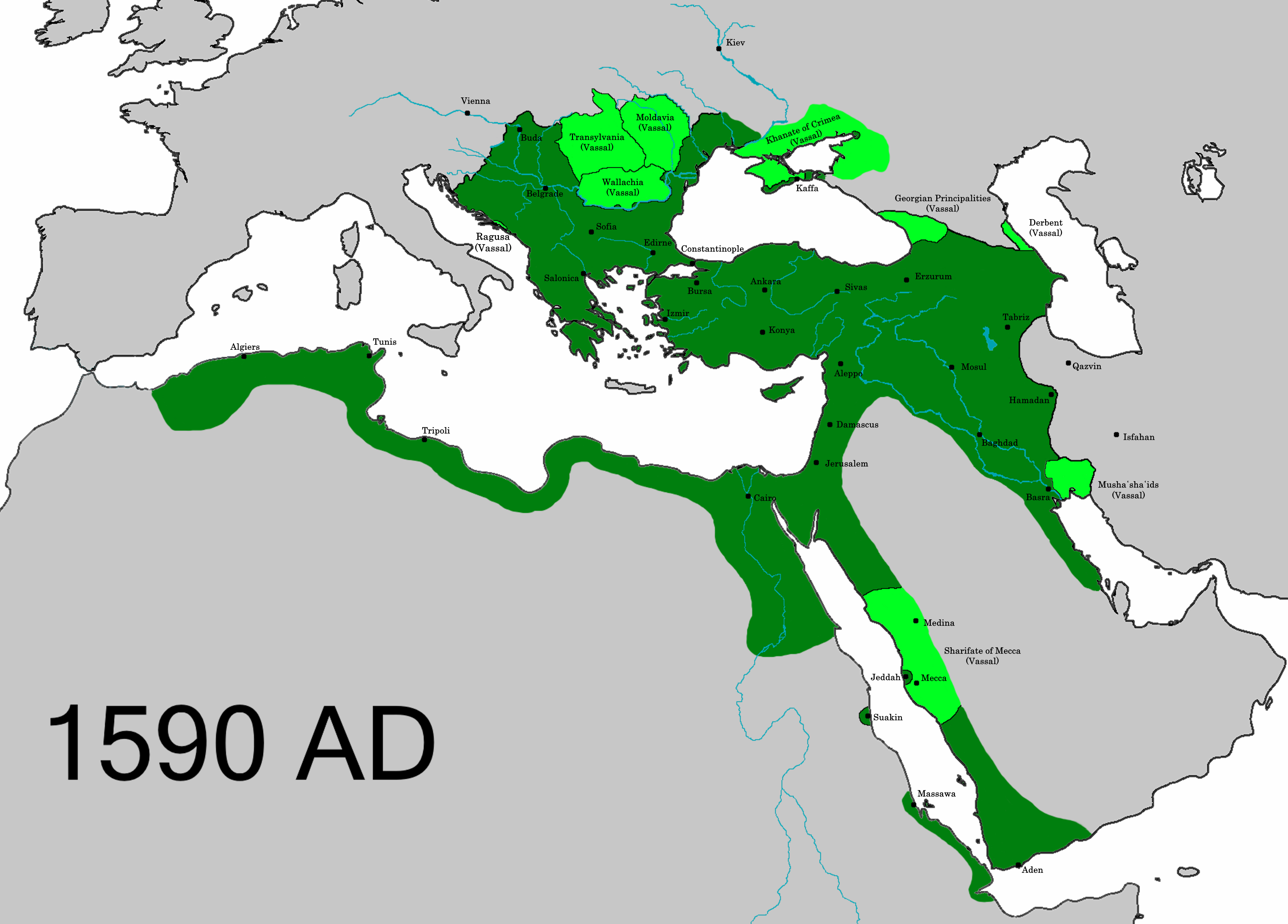
The Ottoman Empire in 1590, following the signing of the Treaty of Constantinople with the Safavids.

Sultan Suleiman I (r. 1520–1566) was the longest-reigning sultan in Ottoman history, but the last years of his reign were characterized by uncertainty over who would be his successor. Suleiman had three sons who could hope to succeed, Mustafa, Selim and Bayezid. While the latter two were the children of Suleiman's wife Hürrem Sultan, the first was the son of Mahidevran Hatun. Mustafa may have felt that his half-brothers possessed an unfair advantage over him, and thus worked to secure the favor of the military. Perhaps suspecting that Mustafa planned to dethrone him just as his own father had done to his grandfather, Suleiman acted first and in 1553 ordered that Mustafa be executed. The death of Hurrem Sultan in 1558 triggered open conflict between the two remaining candidates, and Selim ultimately emerged victorious. Suleiman further strengthened his son's position by arranging a marriage between Selim's daughter and the influential Sokollu Mehmed Pasha (Grand Vizier 1565–1579). Suleiman died in 1566, while besieging the fortress of Szigetvar in Hungary, bringing Selim to the throne.

Selim II was a relatively inactive ruler who was content to allow the highly competent Sokollu Mehmed to run the empire on his behalf. Sokollu carried out a far-reaching foreign policy, dispatching armies to territories as distant as Yemen in the south and Astrakhan in the north. Most significant, however, was the conquest of Venetian Cyprus in 1570 and subsequent Ottoman defeat in the Battle of Lepanto, which paved the way for a Spanish-Ottoman truce in 1580 and continual détente in the Mediterranean. This allowed the Ottomans to focus their expansion to the east against Safavid Iran, where a long and devastating war was fought from 1578 to 1590, from which the Ottomans emerged with significant, if short-lived, conquests.

Selim died in 1574 and was succeeded by his son Murad III (r. 1574–95). This ruler, like his two successors Mehmed III (r. 1595–1603) and Ahmed I (r. 1603–1617), was highly influenced by the changing scene of palace politics. Most significant was the rise in importance of the harem. Whereas Hurrem Sultan's power was based on her personal relationship with Suleiman, the imperial women of this period derived their power from the institutional structure of the harem, which placed immense power into the hands of the sultan's mother, the Valide Sultan. This was directly related to the changes taking place in the system of succession, whereby princes no longer traveled to the provinces to take up governorships, but remained in the harem in Istanbul. From the time of Murad III onward, sultans no longer slept in the male segment of Topkapı Palace, but resided in a new bedchamber within the harem. Due to the increasing role of imperial women in political life, this period is sometimes referred to as the Sultanate of Women.

=== Crisis and adaptation ===
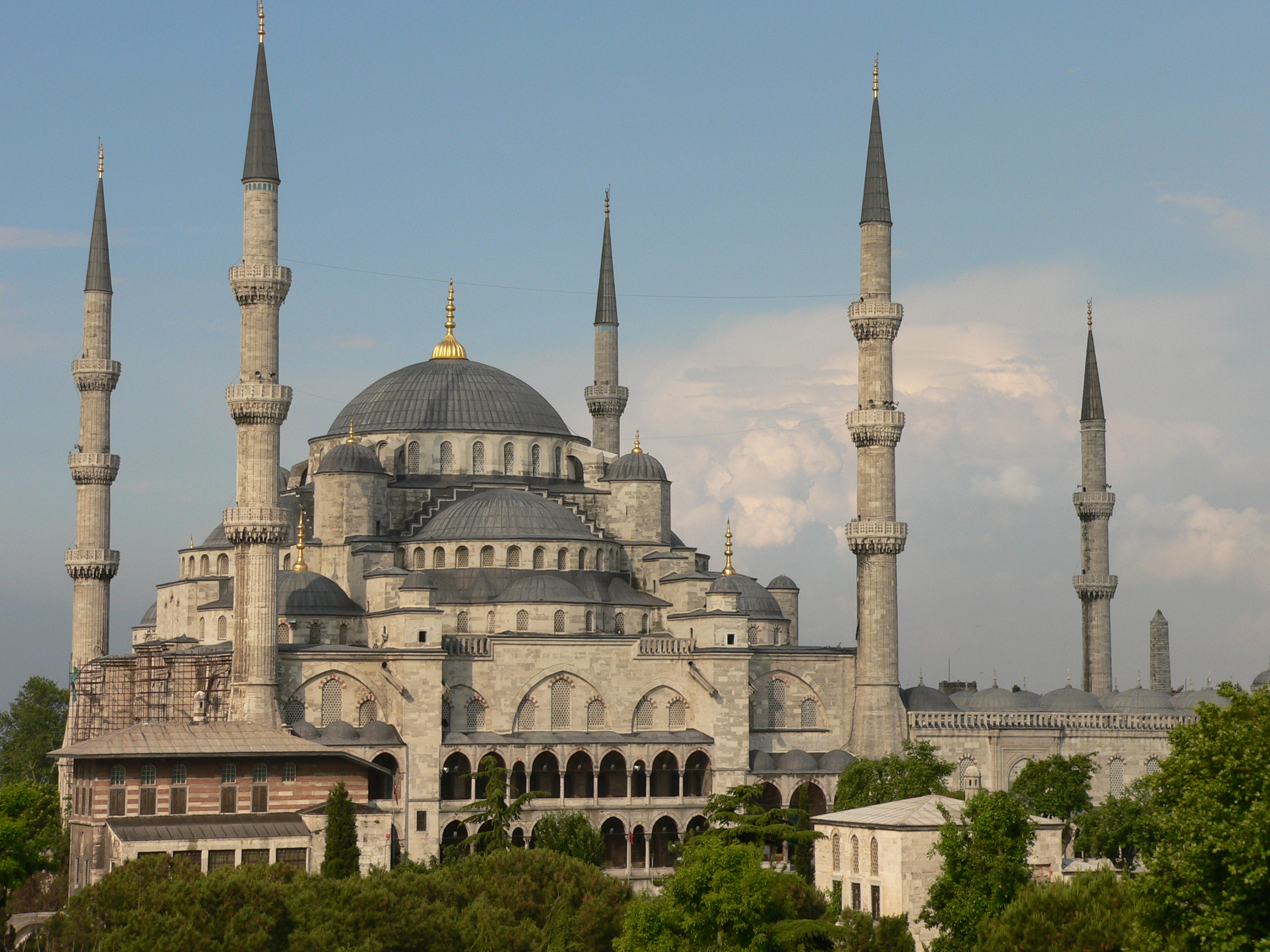
The Blue Mosque in Istanbul, constructed in the reign of Ahmed I (1603–1617).

The Ottoman government at the turn of the century was presented with a severe military and economic crisis. War erupted with the Austrian Habsburgs in 1593 just as Anatolia experienced the first of several Celali Rebellions, in which rural bandit gangs grouped together under provincial warlords to wreak havoc on the countryside. In 1603 the Safavid Shah Abbas I of Persia launched a new war against the Ottomans, reversing all of the gains that had made in the previous decades. Thus the Ottomans found themselves fighting on three fronts at once, at a time when the economy was still recovering from the currency debasement of 1585. To overcome this challenge, they adopted an innovative strategy of co-opting the rebel forces into the structure of the empire. The Celali armies were manned by Anatolian bandits known as sekban, former peasants who sought an alternate livelihood in the harsh economic climate of the turn of the century. When given the opportunity, these men were eager to earn pay and status by serving in the Ottoman army as mercenaries. By recruiting such men into the Ottoman army as musketeers their energies were redirected from banditry and put to use against the empire's external enemies. The Celali leaders, as well, were at times granted positions within the provincial administration in order to pacify them. This did not bring the anarchy in Anatolia to an end, but it did make it easier to manage. In 1609 the grand vizier Kuyucu Murad Pasha traversed Anatolia with an army, clearing away the Celalis wherever he found them and bringing an end to the greater part of Celali activity.

The wars with the Habsburgs and Safavids eventually devolved into stalemates. Mehmed III personally led the Ottoman army to victory over the Habsburgs in the Battle of Keresztes in 1596, and the Ottomans went on to seize the Hungarian fortresses of Eger and Nagykanizsa, but ultimately neither side was able to achieve a decisive victory and the war was brought to an end in 1606 with the Peace of Zsitvatorok. The war with the Safavids continued to drag on until 1618.

The recruitment of sekban as musketeers was part of a larger process of military and fiscal reform which was carried out during this period. The cavalry army which had been supported by the Timar system during the sixteenth century was becoming obsolete as a result of the increasing importance of musket-wielding infantry, and the Ottomans sought to adapt to the changing times. The central army was greatly expanded, particularly the Janissary corps, the empire's premier infantry force. The Janissaries began to experiment with new battlefield tactics, becoming one of the first armies in Europe to utilize volley fire. To pay for the newly expanded army, the Ottomans expanded the practice of tax farming, formerly used primarily in the Arab provinces. Taxation rights which were formerly given to cavalrymen were now sold to the highest bidder, a practice which was in use in much of Europe as well. Other taxes were also reformed, with the wartime tax known as avarız becoming permanent and providing for 20% of the empire's annual revenue. These reforms greatly increased the revenue available to the central government and played a major role in the empire's continued strength throughout the century. To accommodate these changes, the bureaucracy was expanded and diversified, coming to play a much larger role in the empire's administration.

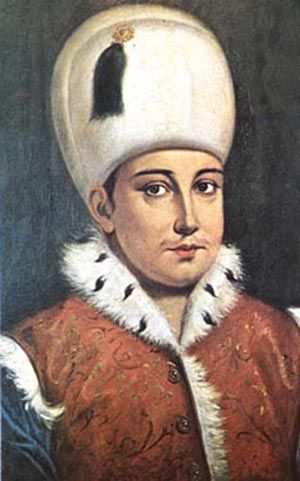
Sultan Osman II, victim of the regicide of 1622.

=== Regicide and war ===
Ahmed I's death in 1617 brought his brother to the throne as Mustafa I, the first instance of a sultan succeeding through seniority. However, before long it became apparent that Mustafa was not mentally sound, and he was deposed the following year in favor of Sultan Ahmed's son Osman II, then aged 13. Osman II was an exceptionally energetic ruler, and sought to restore the authority of the Ottoman sultanate over the other factional groups within the empire. This aroused the anger of both the religious establishment as well as the Janissaries and Imperial Cavalry, and relations became particularly strained after the sultan's failed Polish campaign, in which the army felt it had been mistreated. After their return to Istanbul, Osman II announced his desire to perform the pilgrimage to Mecca; in fact this was a plan to recruit a new and more loyal army in Anatolia, out of the bandit-mercenary forces which had taken part in the Celali Rebellions and the Ottomans' wars with the Habsburgs and Safavids. To prevent him from carrying out this plan, the imperial army launched a revolt on May 18, 1622, and two days later, with the approval of the Şeyhülislâm, executed Osman. This event, the legally approved regicide of a reigning Ottoman monarch, cemented the empire's transformation from a patrimonial empire into one in which power was shared between various loci of authority.

The regicide was followed by the revolt of Abaza Mehmed Pasha, then governor of Erzurum, who vowed to take revenge upon the sultan's killers and massacred the janissaries wherever he found them. Mustafa I, who had been enthroned for the second time, was soon deposed yet again and replaced by Ahmed I's son Murad IV, still a child. Thus with a child on the throne, Istanbul under the control of a Janissary clique, and Abaza Mehmed running rampant in the east, the Safavids saw another opportunity to attack and seized control of Baghdad in January 1624, but were unable to advance to Diyarbakır. In 1628 Abaza Mehmed's revolt was suppressed by the grand vizier Gazi Hüsrev Pasha, whose dismissal from office in 1632 triggered a Janissary revolt. This event fueled Murad IV's desire to regain control over the state, and he henceforth began to exercise power in his own right. He carried out a reform of military land tenure in an effort to strengthen the army, encouraged peasant resettlement of abandoned fields, and enforced moral reform in Istanbul in conjunction with the religious movement of the Kadizadelis. First achieving military success in 1635 with the conquest of Yerevan, he was ultimately able to lead the empire to victory by reconquering Baghdad in 1638 and establishing a long-lasting peace with the Safavids the following year.

Murad IV died in 1640, only 27 years old. He was succeeded by his brother Ibrahim, the only remaining male member of the Ottoman dynasty. Like Mustafa I before him, Ibrahim was mentally unstable, and was initially content to leave the government in the hands of Murad IV's last grand vizier, Kemankeş Mustafa Pasha. This lasted only until 1644, when Ibrahim had him executed and replaced by a rival. The following year war between the Ottoman Empire and Venice was sparked by an incident in which Maltese pirates docked at Venetian Crete after attacking an Ottoman ship carrying pilgrims, including the Chief Black Eunuch, to Mecca. The Ottomans quickly overran most of Crete, but were unable to evict the Venetians from the fortress of Heraklion. At sea, the Venetians managed to achieve the upper hand and blockade the Dardanelles, strangling Istanbul's trade and food supply. The subsequent disorder in the capital prompted Ibrahim's deposition in 1648, which was sanctioned by the Janissaries, the şeyhülislâm, and even Kösem Sultan, his mother. Ibrahim's replacement was his six-year-old son, who was enthroned as Mehmed IV. The new government in Istanbul thus consisted of the young ruler's grandmother and regent Kösem Sultan and her allies in the Janissary Corps, one of whom was made grand vizier. Despite continued unrest both in Istanbul and the provinces, the blockade of the Dardanelles was successfully broken the following year. Kösem's position was nevertheless under threat from Mehmed IV's mother Turhan Sultan. Upon learning of a plot by Kösem to poison Mehmed IV, Turhan's faction leapt into action and assassinated her in 1651.

Turhan Sultan was henceforth in a secure position of power, but was unable to find an effective grand vizier, leaving the empire without a coherent policy with regard to the war with Venice. The result was another revolt of the imperial troops in March 1656, which demanded the lives of several government officials, blamed for neglecting to properly pay the troops who had been struggling to conquer Crete for so long.

=== Köprülü era ===
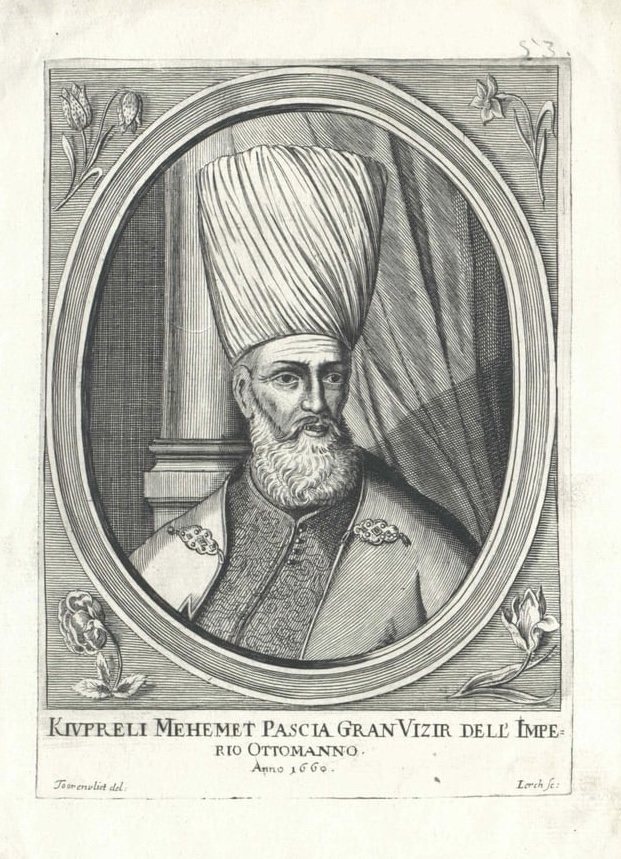
Köprülü Mehmed Pasha (1656–1661) restored stability to the empire after the disorder of the previous decade.

In 1656 the Venetians seized control over the islands of Lemnos and Tenedos, and established another blockade of the Dardanelles. This action led to panic in Istanbul and prompted a renewed political crisis. In need of a change of policy, Turhan Hatice appointed the highly experienced Köprülü Mehmed Pasha as grand vizier, who immediately set forth on a drastic process of reform. This involved the dismissal or execution of all officials deemed corrupt, and their replacement with men loyal to the vizier. While wintering in Edirne after leading a successful campaign to reconquer the islands, Köprülü extended his purge to the imperial cavalry, executing thousands of soldiers who showed any sign of disloyalty. This move prompted a serious reaction, and as Köprülü led the army in a campaign against Transylvania, many of the empire's eastern governors first refused to join him, then launched an open revolt under the leadership of Abaza Hasan Pasha, demanding from the sultan that Köprülü be executed. Mehmed IV, now no longer a minor, chose to side with his vizier and dispatched an army to defeat the rebels. Despite initial rebel victories, the revolt was suddenly brought to an end in February 1659 with the assassination of Abaza Hasan.

Köprülü Mehmed died in 1661, leaving the empire in a much better military and financial position than he had found it. He was succeeded in office by his son Köprülü Fazıl Ahmed Pasha (1661–1676), the first time in history that a grand vizier passed on the office to his son. Fazıl Ahmed was himself succeeded by his adopted brother Merzifonlu Kara Mustafa Pasha (1676–1683), and it is due to this unbroken control of the Köprülü family over the office of grand vizier that this period is referred to as the Köprülü era.

Köprülü Mehmed's two successors were highly competent administrators, and the empire enjoyed a remarkable degree of stability under their tutelage. Mehmed IV was content to allow them to manage the political affairs of the empire, but was nevertheless not an inactive ruler. He played a major role in imperial symbolism and legitimation, traveling with the army on campaign before handing supreme command over to the grand vizier. Thus while not directly leading the army, he still participated in the imperial campaigns, for which he was referred to as gazi, or "holy warrior," by contemporaries. Under the Köprülüs the empire revived its expansion into Europe, conquering territory from the Habsburgs, Poland–Lithuania, and Russia, as well as bringing the war with Venice to an end with the conquest of Heraklion in 1669. The push for territorial expansion under the Köprülüs reached its apex in 1683 with the Siege of Vienna, which ended in Ottoman defeat.

The defeat at Vienna ushered in a major political shift in the empire. As punishment for his failure, Mehmed IV ordered that Merzifonlu Kara Mustafa be executed, bringing an end to the undisputed Köprülü hold over the empire. The result was a period of political confusion at a time when the Ottoman Empire's European enemies were rallying together. In 1684 the Habsburgs, Poland–Lithuania, Venice, and the Papacy forged an alliance known as the Holy League to oppose the Ottomans, launching a period of warfare which would last for sixteen years.

=== War of the Holy League ===
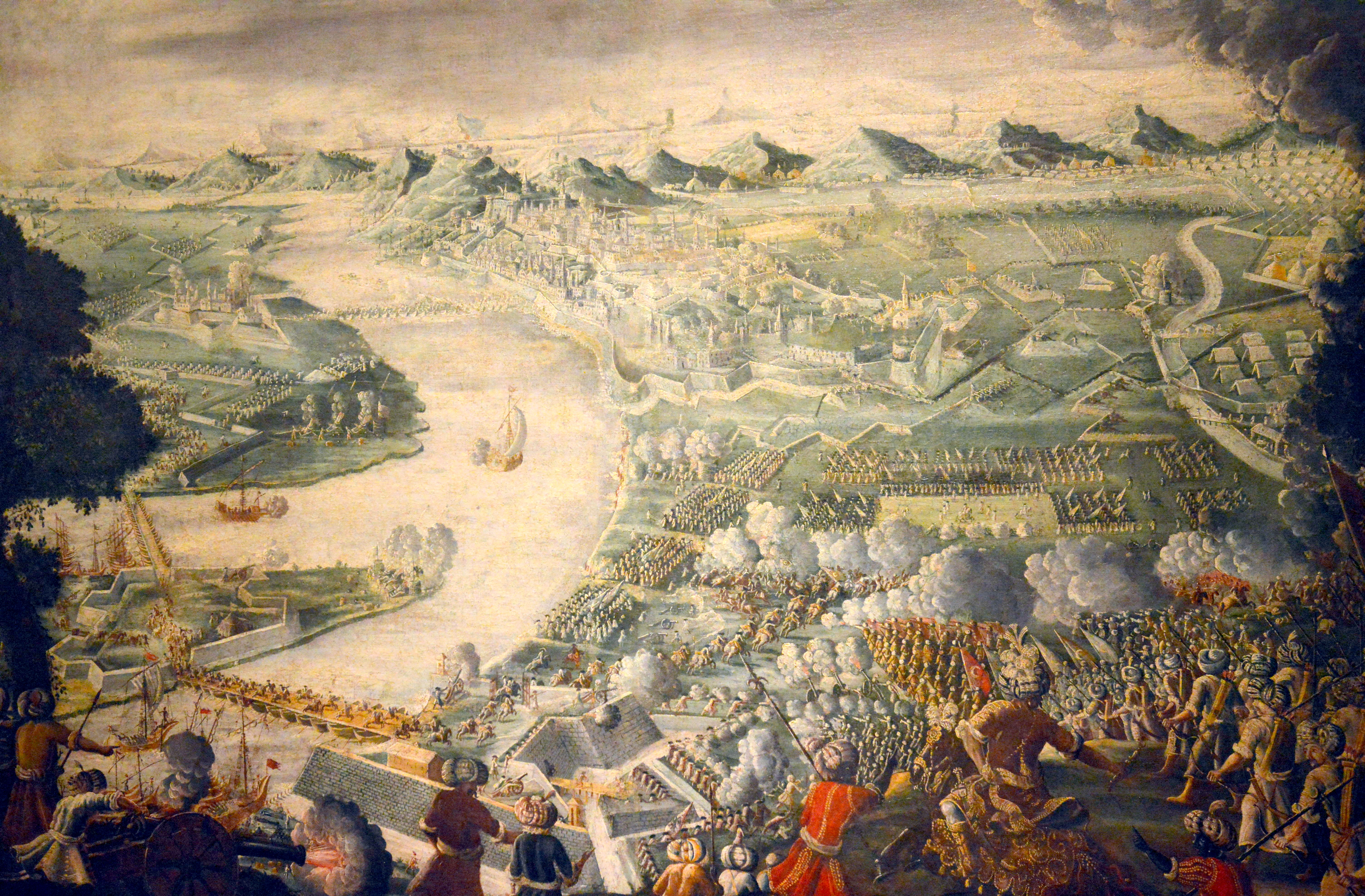
The forces of the Holy League conquer Buda in 1686.

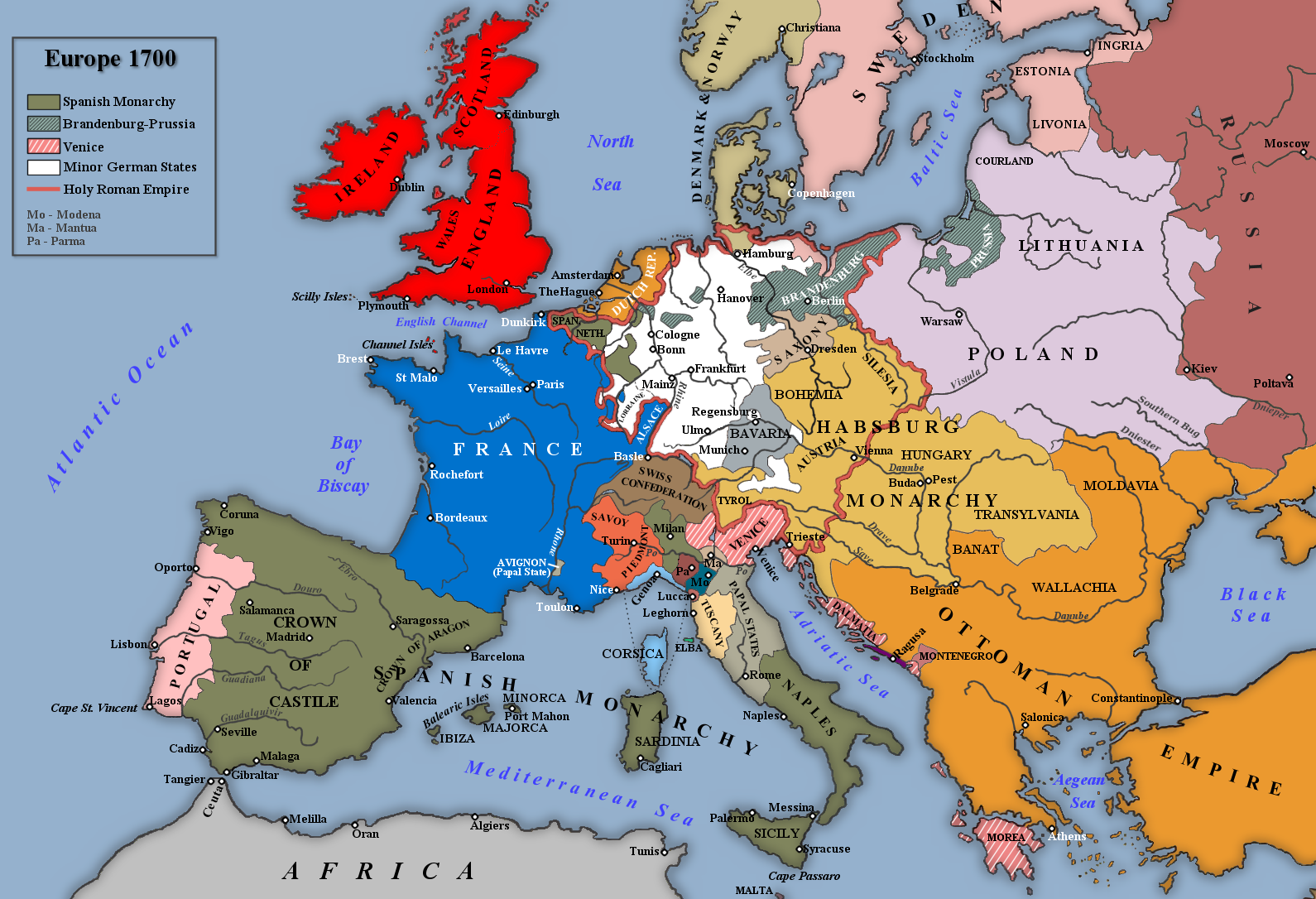
Eighteenth-century Europe depicting the Ottoman Empire's new western boundaries following the Treaty of Karlowitz.

Conflict on multiple fronts placed great strain on the Ottoman ability to wage war. The empire was attacked simultaneously in Hungary, Podolia, and the Mediterranean region, while after 1686 their Crimean vassals, who under normal circumstances supported the Ottoman army with tens of thousands of cavalry, were continually distracted by the need to fend off Russian invasion. Istanbul's food supply was again threatened by Venetian naval activity in the Aegean, contributing to instability in the capital. In Hungary, the Habsburgs first reconquered Nové Zámky in 1684, before moving on to Buda. Despite resisting a siege in 1684, it was unable to hold out against a second two years later, and capitulated to the Habsburgs, leading to much of the country falling under Habsburg control. The Ottomans were able to rescue Osijek from capture, but were defeated in the Second Battle of Mohács in 1687. The army subsequently mutinied and marched on Istanbul, deposing Mehmed IV in favor of his brother Suleiman II. In the chaos the Habsburgs were able to make rapid inroads into Ottoman territory, seizing strongholds such as Eger and Belgrade, reaching as far south as Niš. However, in 1689 the tide turned back in the Ottomans' favor. In 1688 Louis XIV of France had launched the Nine Years' War, distracting Habsburg attention from the Ottoman front. Köprülü Fazıl Mustafa Pasha, a younger son of Köprülü Mehmed, was appointed grand vizier and led the army to successfully recover both Niš and Belgrade. What followed was a long period of stalemate, with the Habsburgs having lost their bridgehead south of the Danube and the Ottomans unable to achieve any lasting success north of it. The Habsburgs concerned themselves with the conquest of the Principality of Transylvania, an Ottoman vassal state, the loss of which the Ottomans were forced to accept after the disastrous defeat of an army personally led by Sultan Mustafa II in the 1697 Battle of Zenta. This defeat prompted the Ottomans to sue for peace.

While territorial losses to the Habsburgs have at times been cited as evidence of military weakness, more recently historians have challenged this notion, arguing that Ottoman defeats were primarily a result of the sheer size of the coalition arrayed against them, and the logistical burden of fighting a war on multiple fronts. To this may be added political instability, for the empire's greatest losses took place from 1684 to 1688, when its political leadership was paralyzed first by the execution of Kara Mustafa Pasha and then the deposition of Mehmed IV. Subsequently, the Ottomans were able to stabilize their position and reverse Habsburg gains south of the Danube.

The pressure of sustained warfare had prompted the Ottomans to carry out extensive fiscal reform. The sale of tobacco was legalized and taxed, previously tax-immune waqf finances were reformed, and the janissary payrolls were examined and updated. Most significantly, in 1691 the standard unit of cizye assessment was shifted from the household to the individual, and in 1695 the sale of life-term tax farms known as malikâne was implemented, vastly increasing the empire's revenue. These measures enabled the Ottoman Empire to maintain fiscal solvency during the war, and to enjoy significant budget surpluses by the beginning of the eighteenth century.

The war was brought to an end in 1699 with the Treaty of Karlowitz. On the general principle of uti possidetis, the Ottomans agreed to permanently cede all of Hungary and Transylvania to the Habsburgs, with the exception of the Banat region. Morea was annexed by Venice, while Podolia was returned to Poland–Lithuania. Karlowitz was highly significant for both Ottoman and Eastern European history in general, for it marked the definitive end of Ottoman imperial expansion. After a final disastrous attempt to recover Hungary in the Austro-Turkish War (1716–1718) Ottoman foreign policy in Europe during the subsequent eighteenth century was generally peaceful and defensive, focused on the maintenance of a secure network of fortresses along the Danube frontier. Sultan Mustafa II was overthrown in the 1703 Edirne incident, bringing an end to the rule of the final Ottoman warrior-sultan, cementing the empire's transformation into a bureaucratic empire.

== See also ==
- The General Crisis
- Great power
- Superpower

== Bibliography ==
- Abou-El-Haj, Rifaat (1974). "The Ottoman Vezir and Pasha Households 1683–1703: A Preliminary Report". Journal of the American Oriental Society. 94 (4): 438–447. doi:10.2307/600586. JSTOR 600586.
- Abou-El-Haj, Rifaat (2005). Formation of the Modern State: The Ottoman Empire, Sixteenth through Eighteenth Centuries (2 ed.). Syracuse University Press. ISBN 978-0-8156-3085-2.
- Ágoston, Gábor (2000). "The costs of the Ottoman fortress-system in Hungary in the sixteenth and seventeenth centuries". In Dávid, Géza; Pál Fodor (eds.). Ottomans, Hungarians, and Habsburgs in Central Europe: The Military Confines in the Age of Ottoman Conquest. Leiden: Brill. pp. 195–228.
- Ágoston, Gábor (2005). Guns for the Sultan: Military Power and the Weapons Industry in the Ottoman Empire. Cambridge: Cambridge University Press.
- Ágoston, Gábor (2011). "Defending and administering the Hungarian frontier". In Christine Woodhead (ed.). The Ottoman World. Routledge. pp. 220–236.
- Ágoston, Gábor (2014). "Firearms and Military Adaptation: The Ottomans and the European Military Revolution, 1450–1800". Journal of World History. 25: 85–124. doi:10.1353/jwh.2014.0005. S2CID 143042353.
- Aksan, Virginia (2007). Ottoman Wars, 1700–1860: An Empire Besieged. Pearson Education Ltd. ISBN 978-0-582-30807-7.
- Baer, Marc David (2008). Honored by the Glory of Islam: Conversion and Conquest in Ottoman Europe. Oxford University Press. ISBN 978-0-19-979783-7.
- Barkey, Karen (1994). Bandits and Bureaucrats: The Ottoman Route to State Centralization. Cornell University Press. ISBN 0-8014-2944-7.
- Börekçi, Günhan (2006). "A Contribution to the Military Revolution Debate: The Janissaries' Use of Volley Fire during the Long Ottoman-Habsburg War of 1593–1606 and the Problem of Origins". Acta Orientalia Academiae Scientiarum Hungaricae. 59 (4): 407–438. doi:10.1556/AOrient.59.2006.4.2.
- Darling, Linda (1996). Revenue-Raising and Legitimacy: Tax Collection and Finance Administration in the Ottoman Empire, 1560–1660. E.J. Brill. ISBN 90-04-10289-2.
- Dávid, Géza; Pál Fodor, eds. (2000). Ottomans, Hungarians, and Habsburgs in Central Europe: The Military Confines in the Age of Ottoman Conquest. Leiden: Brill.
- El-Rouayheb, Khaled (2015). Islamic Intellectual History in the Seventeenth Century: Scholarly Currents in the Ottoman Empire and the Maghreb. Cambridge University Press. ISBN 978-1-107-04296-4.
- Eldem, Edhem (2009). "Istanbul". In Ágoston, Gábor; Bruce Masters (eds.). Encyclopedia of the Ottoman Empire. Facts On File. pp. 286–90. ISBN 9780816062591.
- Faroqhi, Suraiya (1994). "Crisis and Change, 1590–1699". In İnalcık, Halil; Donald Quataert (eds.). An Economic and Social History of the Ottoman Empire, 1300–1914. Vol. 2. Cambridge University Press. pp. 411–636. ISBN 0-521-57455-2.
- Findley, Carter Vaughn (2010). Turkey, Islam, Nationalism and Modernity: A History, 1789-2007. New Haven: Yale University Press. pp. 51. ISBN 978-0-300-15260-9.
- Finkel, Caroline (2005). Osman's Dream: The Story of the Ottoman Empire, 1300–1923. New York: Basic Books. ISBN 978-0-465-02396-7.
- Goffman, Daniel (1998). Britons in the Ottoman Empire, 1642–1660. Seattle: University of Washington Press. ISBN 0-295-97668-3.
- Greene, Molly (2002). "Beyond the Northern Invasion: The Mediterranean in the Seventeenth Century". Past & Present (174): 42–71. doi:10.1093/past/174.1.42.
- Hathaway, Jane (2008). The Arab Lands under Ottoman Rule, 1516–1800. Pearson Education Ltd. ISBN 978-0-582-41899-8.
- Hess, Andrew (1978). The Forgotten Frontier: A History of the Sixteenth-Century Ibero-African Frontier. Chicago: University of Chicago Press. ISBN 978-0-226-33031-0.
- Howard, Douglas (1988). "Ottoman Historiography and the Literature of 'Decline' of the Sixteenth and Seventeenth Century". Journal of Asian History. 22: 52–77.
- Hegyi, Klára (2000). "The Ottoman network of fortresses in Hungary". In Dávid, Géza; Pál Fodor (eds.). Ottomans, Hungarians, and Habsburgs in Central Europe: The Military Confines in the Age of Ottoman Conquest. Leiden: Brill. pp. 163–194.
- İnalcık, Halil (1994). İnalcık, Halil; Donald Quataert (eds.). An Economic and Social History of the Ottoman Empire, 1300–1914. Vol. 1. Cambridge University Press. ISBN 0-521-57456-0.
- Ivanics, Mária (2007). "Enslavement, Slave Labour, and the Treatment of Captives in the Crimean Khanate". In Dávid, Géza; Pál Fodor (eds.). Ransom Slavery along the Ottoman Borders (Early Fifteenth-Early Eighteenth Centuries). Leiden: Brill. pp. 193–219.
- Kołodziejczyk, Dariusz (2004). The Ottoman Survey Register of Podolia (ca. 1681) Part I: Text, Translation, and Commentary. Harvard University Press.
- Kołodziejczyk, Dariusz (2012). "Khan, caliph, tsar and imperator: the multiple identities of the Ottoman sultan". In Fibiger Bang, Peter; Kołodziejczyk, Dariusz (eds.). Universal Empire: A Comparative Approach to Imperial Culture and Representation in Eurasian History. Cambridge: Cambridge University Press. ISBN 978-1139136952.
- Kołodziejczyk, Dariusz (2013). "What is Inside and What is Outside? Tributary States in Ottoman Politics". In Kármán, Gábor; Lovro Kunčević (eds.). The European Tributary States of the Ottoman Empire in the Sixteenth and Seventeenth Centuries. Leiden: Brill. pp. 421–32. ISBN 978-90-04-24606-5.
- Kunt, Metin (1983). The Sultan's Servants: The Transformation of Ottoman Provincial Government, 1550–1650. Columbia University Press. ISBN 0-231-05578-1.
- Mandaville, Jon E. (1970). "The Ottoman Province of al-Hasā in the Sixteenth and Seventeenth Centuries". Journal of the American Oriental Society. 90 (3): 486–513. doi:10.2307/597091. JSTOR 597091.
- Masters, Bruce (1988). The Origins of Western Economic Dominance in the Middle East: Mercantilism and the Islamic Economy in Aleppo, 1600–1750. New York University Press. ISBN 978-0-814-75435-1.
- Masters, Bruce (2009). "Capitulations". In Ágoston, Gábor; Bruce Masters (eds.). Encyclopedia of the Ottoman Empire. Facts On File. pp. 118–9. ISBN 9780816062591.
- Minkov, Anton (2004). Conversion to Islam in the Balkans: Kisve Bahasi Petitions and Ottoman Social Life, 1670–1730. Brill. ISBN 90-04-13576-6.
- Murphey, Rhoads (1993). "Continuity and Discontinuity in Ottoman Administrative Theory and Practice during the Late Seventeenth Century". Poetics Today. 14 (2): 419–443. doi:10.2307/1773126. JSTOR 1773126.
- Murphey, Rhoads (1999). Ottoman Warfare, 1500–1700. Rutgers University Press. ISBN 1-85728-389-9.
- Murphey, Rhoads (2008). Exploring Ottoman Sovereignty: Tradition, Image, and Practice in the Ottoman Imperial Household, 1400–1800. London: Continuum. ISBN 978-1-84725-220-3.
- Murphey, Rhoads (2009). "Ottoman historical writing in the seventeenth-century: a survey of the general development of the genre after the reign of Sultan Ahmed I (1603–1617)". Essays on Ottoman Historians and Historiography. Istanbul: Muhittin Salih Eren. pp. 89–120.
- Necipoğlu, Gülru (1991). Architecture, Ceremonial, and Power: The Topkapı Palace in the Fifteenth and Sixteenth Centuries. Cambridge: MIT Press. ISBN 0-262-14050-0.
- Ostapchuk, Victor (2001). "The Human Landscape of the Ottoman Black Sea in the Face of the Cossack Naval Raids". Oriente Moderno. 20: 23–95. doi:10.1163/22138617-08101003.
- Özel, Oktay (2012). "The reign of violence: the Celalis, c.1550–1700". In Woodhead, Christine (ed.). The Ottoman World. Routledge. pp. 184–204. ISBN 978-0-415-44492-7.
- Pamuk, Şevket (1997). "In the Absence of Domestic Currency: Debased European Coinage in the Seventeenth-Century Ottoman Empire". The Journal of Economic History. 57 (2): 345–66. doi:10.1017/S0022050700018477. S2CID 154823709.
- Pamuk, Şevket (2000). A Monetary History of the Ottoman Empire. Cambridge University Press.
- Peirce, Leslie (1993). The Imperial Harem: Women and Sovereignty in the Ottoman Empire. Oxford University Press. ISBN 0-19-508677-5.
- Şahin, Kaya (2013). Empire and Power in the reign of Süleyman: Narrating the Sixteenth-Century Ottoman World. Cambridge University Press. ISBN 978-1-107-03442-6.
- Schwarz, Klaus (1987). "Zur Blockade der Dardanellen während des venezianisch-osmanischen Krieges um Kreta im Jahre 1650". Wiener Zeitschrift für die Kunde des Morgenlandes. 77: 69–86. [in German]
- Soucek, Svat (2015). Ottoman Maritime Wars, 1416–1700. Istanbul: The Isis Press. ISBN 978-975-428-554-3.
- Szabó, János B. (2013). "'Splendid Isolation'? The Military Cooperation of the Principality of Transylvania with the Ottoman Empire (1571–1688) in the Mirror of the Hungarian Historiography's Dilemmas". In Kármán, Gábor; Lovro Kunčević (eds.). The European Tributary States of the Ottoman Empire in the Sixteenth and Seventeenth Centuries. Leiden: Brill. pp. 301–340.
- Tezcan, Baki (2010). The Second Ottoman Empire: Political and Social Transformation in the Early Modern Period. Cambridge University Press. ISBN 978-1-107-41144-9.
- Thomas, Lewis V. (1972). Norman Itzkowitz (ed.). A Study of Naima. New York University Press.
- Woodhead, Christine, ed. (2011). The Ottoman World. Routledge. ISBN 978-0-415-44492-7.
