= Government effectiveness index =

World Bank measure of government quality

The government effectiveness index is a ranking of state capacity developed by the World Bank Group. It measures the quality of public services, civil service, policy formulation and implementation, and the credibility of a government's commitment to improving or maintaining these aspects. The index includes 193 countries, each scored from -2.5 (less effective) to 2.5 (more effective). It is part of a broader set of government quality indicators.

The World Bank releases the government effectiveness index as one of six worldwide governance indicators. The others are voice and accountability, political stability, regulatory quality, the rule of law, and control of corruption. Daniel Kaufmann of the Natural Resource Governance Institute and Aart Kraay of the World Bank Development Research Group produce these indexes. They consider these six indexes as dimensions of governance.

== Methodology ==
The government effectiveness index makes use of 47 variables. These variables span a range from the quality of bureaucracy to the infrastructure for the distribution of goods and services. They come from 32 different sources, including the African Development Bank and the Global Insight Business Conditions and Risk Indicators. These variables undergo rescaling and are then combined using the unobserved components model.

== Significance ==
As an overall measure, the government effectiveness index doesn't provide the means to pinpoint specific issues within a country or to analyse particular solutions. However, it is useful for comparing countries in general, tracking a particular country's improvement, or discerning trends.

Government effectiveness strongly correlates with life satisfaction, GDP per capita, and education expenditure. According to Guisan, it promotes development.

== See also ==
- Governance
- World Governance Index
- Public Administration
- World Bank
- Policy
- Effective altruism
- Correlation
