= WGI =

WGI may refer to:

- Winter Guard International, an organization for pageantry and performing arts
- Worldwide Governance Indicators, an index built by the World Bank to evaluate country governance
- World Governance Index, index developed in 2008 by Forum for a new World Governance
- WGI (radio station), an early commercial radio station in Medford Hillside, Massachusetts
- Watkins Glen International, a racetrack in western New York State
- World Giving Index, an annual report published by the Charities Aid Foundation
