= Catholic Conference =

Catholic Conference may refer to:

== Religion ==
- Episcopal conference, an official assembly of the bishops of the Catholic Church in a given territory
  - Australian Catholic Bishops' Conference
  - Canadian Conference of Catholic Bishops
  - Catholic Bishops' Conference of Bangladesh
  - Catholic Bishops' Conference of England and Wales
  - Catholic Bishops' Conference of Ethiopia and Eritrea
  - Catholic Bishops' Conference of India
  - Catholic Bishops' Conference of Japan
  - Catholic Bishops' Conference of Korea
  - Catholic Bishops' Conference of Malaysia, Singapore and Brunei
  - Catholic Bishops' Conference of Myanmar
  - Catholic Bishops' Conference of Nigeria
  - Catholic Bishops' Conference of Sri Lanka
  - Catholic Bishops' Conference of the Philippines
  - Catholic Bishops' Conference of Vietnam
  - Hungarian Catholic Bishops' Conference
  - Inter-territorial Catholic Bishops' Conference of The Gambia and Sierra Leone
  - International Old Catholic Bishops' Conference
  - Irish Catholic Bishops' Conference
  - Lesotho Catholic Bishops' Conference
  - Namibian Catholic Bishops' Conference
  - Pakistan Catholic Bishops' Conference
  - Southern African Catholic Bishops' Conference
  - Sudan Catholic Bishops' Conference
  - United States Conference of Catholic Bishops
  - Zimbabwe Catholic Bishops' Conference

== Sports ==
- Catholic Conference (MIAA), a Massachusetts high school athletic conference
- Catholic Conference (Delaware), a high school sports conference comprising girls athletic programs in Delaware
- East Suburban Catholic Conference, an athletic conference consisting of nine Catholic high schools in the suburbs of Chicago, Illinois
- Metro Catholic Conference, a high school athletic conference in Greater St. Louis
- Suburban Christian Conference, formerly called the Suburban Catholic Conference, a school sports conference of Christian schools in Chicago's suburbs

== Other ==
- International Catholic Conference of Scouting, an autonomous, international body committed to promoting and supporting Catholic Scout associations
- National Catholic Youth Conference, a three-day event for Roman Catholic youth

== See also ==
- Catholic League (disambiguation)
