= Holy League =

Crusade campaigns organised as Holy Leagues

Commencing in 1332, the numerous Holy Leagues were a new manifestation of the Crusading movement in the form of temporary alliances between interested Christian powers. Successful campaigns included the capture of Smyrna in 1344, at the Battle of Lepanto in 1571 and the recovery of some parts of the Balkans between 1684 and 1697.

According to Arnaud Blin, "the Holy Leagues retained both the spirit and the language of the Crusades" while in practical terms being quite different. The initiative for a holy league often came from a secular power, not the pope, but papal involvement was inevitable if it was to have the same spiritual benefits to participants as a crusade. Several factors encouraged the transition away from supranational crusades to state alliances, including the rise of the great powers in Europe and the unification of the Muslim enemy in the form of the Ottoman Empire.

== Holy Leagues ==
- Holy League (1332), an alliance of Christian states (including the Orthodox Byzantine Empire) raised to combat the naval threat of Turkish beyliks in the Eastern Mediterranean
- Holy League (1495) or League of Venice, an alliance of several opponents of French hegemony in Italy
- Holy League (1511), a Papal-Venetian-Spanish-Imperial-English alliance against France
- Holy League (1526), or League of Cognac, formed by France, the papacy, England, Venice and Milan against Emperor Charles V
- Holy League (1535), a short-lived alliance of Catholic states
- Holy League (1538), a short-lived alliance of Catholic states against the Ottoman Empire
- Holy League (1571), an alliance of major Catholic maritime states which defeated the Ottomans in the Battle of Lepanto
- Holy League (1594), a military alliance of Christian countries against the Ottoman Empire
- Holy League (1684), composed of the Holy Roman Empire, the Polish-Lithuanian Commonwealth, Venice and Russia against the Ottoman Empire
- Holy League (1717), an alliance of the Papal States, Portugal, Venice and Malta against the Ottoman Empire

== See also ==
- Catholic League (disambiguation)
- Holy Alliance
- War of the Holy League (disambiguation)

== Bibliography ==
- Blin, Arnaud (2019). War and Religion: Europe and the Mediterranean from the First through the Twenty-first Centuries. University of California Press.
- Riley-Smith, Jonathan (1995). "The Crusading Movement and Historians". In Riley-Smith, Jonathan (ed.). The Oxford Illustrated History of the Crusades. Oxford University Press. pp. 1–12. ISBN 978-0-19285428-5.
