= Catholic League =

Catholic League may refer to:

- Catholic League (French) (1576–1577, 1584–1595), created by Henry of Guise, in 1576 during the French Wars of Religion
- Catholic League (German) (1609–1635), a confederation of Catholic German states formed to counteract the Protestant Union
- Catholic League (U.S.) (1973–present), a Roman Catholic advocacy organization in the United States
- Catholic League (English) (1913–present), an organization to promote reunion of the Church of England and the Holy See

== Sports ==
- Baltimore Catholic League, a competitive basketball association composed of private Catholic high schools in the Baltimore, Maryland area
- Catholic High School League, a high school athletic conference of the Detroit metropolitan area
- Chicago Catholic League, a high school athletic conference of the Chicago metropolitan area
- New Orleans Catholic League, a high school athletic league in the New Orleans, Louisiana area
- Philadelphia Catholic League, a high school sports league composed of 20 Catholic High Schools in and around Philadelphia

== See also ==
- Catholic Conference (disambiguation)
- Holy League (disambiguation)
