= War of the Holy League =

There were several wars of the Holy League in European history:

- The part of the War of the League of Cambrai from 1511 to 1514
- War of the Holy League (1538-1540) centered on the Battle of Preveza (1538) and Siege of Castelnuovo (1539)
- Part of the Fourth Ottoman-Venetian War from 1570 to 1573 centered on the battle of Lepanto
- The Great Turkish War from 1683 to 1699

== See also ==
- Holy League
