= Stock sampling =

Stock sampling is sampling people in a certain state at the time of the survey. This is in contrast to flow sampling, where the relationship of interest deals with duration or survival analysis. In stock sampling, rather than focusing on transitions within a certain time interval, we only have observations at a certain point in time. This can lead to both left and right censoring. Imposing the same model on data that have been generated under the two different sampling regimes can lead to research reaching fundamentally different conclusions if the joint distribution across the flow and stock samples differ sufficiently.

Stock sampling essentially leads to a sample selection problem. This selection issue is akin to the truncated regression model where we face selection on the basis of a binary response variable, but the problem has been referred to as length-biased sampling in this specific context. Consider, for example, the figure below that plots some duration data. If a researcher would revert to stock sampling and only sample and survey individuals at the survey dates (i.e. the survey data, 12 months after the survey date, etc.), there is a high likelihood the short duration spells will be omitted from the sample, as some durations shorter than 12 months are necessarily omitted from the sample:

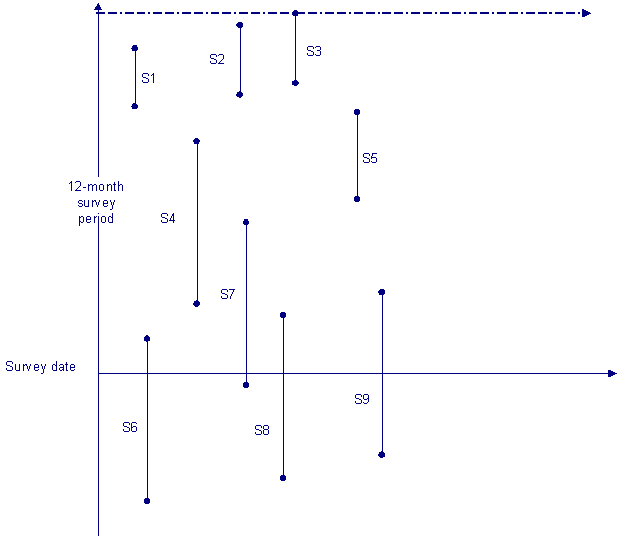
Source: Cameron A. C. and P. K. Trivedi (2005): Microeconometrics: Methods and Applications. Cambridge University Press, New York.

A number of methods to adjust for these sampling issues have been proposed. One can appropriately adjust the maximum likelihood estimation for censored flow data for the sample selection, or use nonparametric estimation methods for censored flow data for the sample selection, or use nonparametric estimation methods for censored data.
