= Catholic Conference (Delaware) =

High school sports conference

The Catholic Conference is a high school sports conference comprising girls athletic programs in Delaware. Members include:

- Padua Academy
- St. Elizabeth High School
- Ursuline Academy
