= World Governance Index =

Index developed in 2008 by the Forum for a New World Governance

The Worldwide Governance Indicators (WGI) is a project that reports both aggregate and individual governance indicators for over 200 countries and territories covering the period from 1996 to 2021. It considers six dimensions of governance:

- Voice and Accountability
- Political Stability and Absence of Violence/Terrorism
- Government Effectiveness
- Regulatory Quality
- Rule of Law
- Control of Corruption

These aggregate indicators are based on the views of a large number of enterprise, citizen, and expert survey respondents in both industrial and developing countries. The indicators draw from over 30 individual data sources produced by a variety of survey institutes, think tanks, non-governmental organizations, international organizations, and private sector firms.

The 2022 WGI update includes significant revisions to the underlying source data, which affect the data for earlier years in the WGI dataset. This latest release supersedes previous releases.

== Background ==
Creating a set of indicators for the World Governance Index (WGI) is a comprehensive and complex process. The objective is to measure a modern concept that, despite its historical roots, is currently applied in certain frameworks and implemented by identified entities. Although there is agreement on diagnosing its challenges, it is still far from being fully "stabilized".

Drawing from the United Nations Millennium Declaration, which was unanimously adopted by heads of state and government in 2000, a team of researchers from the Forum for a new World Governance (FnWG), consisting of Gustavo Marín, Arnaud Blin, and Renaud François, concentrated their research on five core concepts that outline the application framework of world governance and represent key objectives to be achieved by 2015:

- Peace / Security
- Democracy / Rule of Law
- Human Rights / Participation
- Sustainable Development
- Human Development

== Purpose ==
The research team considered its mission with two goals in mind:

- The first was to create a World Governance Index (WGI) providing an overall picture of world governance at time T based on data obtained for the 179 countries included in the survey. The WGI combines 5 indicators, each made up of 13 sub-indicators, each of those made up of 37 indexes. These indexes were selected from among the best available databases. They are all provided by recognized sources, well known for their quality, seriousness, and reliability.

Factors constituting the World Governance Index
Indicator	Sub-indicator	Index
Peace / Security	National Security	Conflicts
Peace / Security	National Security	Refugees / Asylum Seekers
Peace / Security	National Security	Displaced Persons
Peace / Security	Public Security	Political climate
Peace / Security	Public Security	Degree of trust
Peace / Security	Public Security	Violent Crime
Peace / Security	Public Security	Homicides / 100,000 inhabitants
Rule of Law	Body of Laws	Ratification of International Treaties
Rule of Law	Body of Laws	Protection of Property Rights
Rule of Law	Legal System	Independence
Rule of Law	Legal System	Effectiveness
Rule of Law	Legal System	Settlement of Contractual Disputes
Rule of Law	Corruption	Corruption Perceptions Index
Human Rights / Participation	Civil and Political Rights	Respect of Civil Rights
Human Rights / Participation	Civil and Political Rights	Respect of Physical Integrity Rights
Human Rights / Participation	Civil and Political Rights	Freedom of the Press
Human Rights / Participation	Civil and Political Rights	Violence against the Press
Human Rights / Participation	Participation	Participation in Political Life
Human Rights / Participation	Participation	Electoral Process and Pluralism
Human Rights / Participation	Participation	Political Culture
Human Rights / Participation	Discrimination / Gender Inequalities	Women's Political Rights
Human Rights / Participation	Discrimination / Gender Inequalities	Women's Social Rights
Human Rights / Participation	Discrimination / Gender Inequalities	Women's Economic Rights
Human Rights / Participation	Discrimination / Gender Inequalities	Female Parliamentary Rate
Sustainable Development	Economic Sector	Gross Domestic Product (GDP) per capita
Sustainable Development	Economic Sector	GDP Growth Rate
Sustainable Development	Economic Sector	Inflation Rate
Sustainable Development	Economic Sector	Ease in starting a business
Sustainable Development	Social Dimension	Poverty Rate / Inequalities (Gini Coefficient)
Sustainable Development	Social Dimension	Unemployment Rate
Sustainable Development	Social Dimension	Ratification of International Labor Law Treaties
Sustainable Development	Environmental Dimension	Ecological Footprint / Biocapacity
Sustainable Development	Environmental Dimension	Environmental Sustainability
Sustainable Development	Environmental Dimension	Environmental Performance Index
Human Development	Development	Human Development
Human Development	Well-being / Happiness	Subjective Well-being
Human Development	Well-being / Happiness	Happiness

- The second goal is to motivate world-governance actors to consider the resulting WGI and the relative importance of the different indicators. This should allow them to identify the "key" or "pilot" indicators that will set up the conditions for good world governance and, more importantly, guarantee their sustainability. The ultimate goal of this study is part of a long-term process. On the basis of the situation described by the WGI and of its diagnosis, it should allow actors in charge of governance to raise the right questions in order to consider solutions.

== Methodology and databases ==
The 37 indexes constituting the WGI have been set on a scale from zero to one, a scale similar to the one developed by the United Nations Development Programme for its Human Development Index (HDI).

Although some of the indexes used (only 4 out of the 37) were drawn from databases that had not been updated since 2007, the 2008 World Governance Index nevertheless reflects the state of world governance in 2008.

The regional rankings are inspired from UNDP classification. The 179 countries surveyed in this study —microstates were deliberately not included in this list – were grouped into six regional subgroups:

- Africa
- European Union / OECD
- Latin America / Caribbean
- Asia / Pacific
- Arab World
- NIS / Central Asia / Balkans

== Sources ==
World Governance Index: PDF document, 81 pages.
