= Kapıkulu Cavalry =

Elite military corps of the Ottoman Empire

The Kapıkulu Cavalry (Turkish: Kapıkulu süvarileri) or Sipahis of the Porte, was a corps of elite imperial cavalry guards in the army of the Ottoman Empire. There were not really six, but four, divisions in the corps. Two of the six were sub-divisions.

The elite cavalry was the mounted counterpart to the Janissaries and played an important part in the Ottoman army serving as guards for the Sultan on the battlefield and breaking through main lines to secure decisive victories.

The Kapıkulu Cavalry formed the cavalry branch of the Kapıkulu army, which also included the Janissaries, the infantry branch.

== Regiments ==
The Porte's cavalry regiments were called "men" or "people of the six regiments" (Turkish: altı-bölük halkı). Although the term sipahi ("horsemen") was used for these units, it was generally used for the feudal cavalry, the Timarli sipahi.

- Kapıkulu Sipahi ("household slave soldiers"), elite cavalry.
- Silahdars (From Persian, translated roughly as "weaponbearers")
- Ulufeci (Turkish: Ulufeciler; translated as "stipendiaries"), organised into two sub-divisions:
  - Ulufecis of the Left (Ottoman Turkish: علوفه جي يسار)
  - Ulufecis of the Right (Ottoman Turkish: علوفه جي يمين)
- Garips (Turkish: Garipler; translated roughly as "strangers"), organised into two sub-divisions:
  - Garips of the Left
  - Garips of the Right

== Sources ==
- Uyar, Mesut; Erickson, Edward J. (2009). A Military History of the Ottomans: From Osman to Atatürk. ABC-CLIO. ISBN 978-0-275-98876-0.
- Shaw, Stanford J. (1976). History of the Ottoman Empire and Modern Turkey: Volume 1, Empire of the Gazis: The Rise and Decline of the Ottoman Empire 1280-1808. Cambridge University Press. pp. 124-. ISBN 978-0-521-29163-7.

== See also ==
- Military of the Ottoman Empire
