= Gustavo Marín =

Chilean-French economist and sociologist (born 1950)

Gustavo Marín, a Chilean-French economist and sociologist, is noted in particular for his key role in the creation and development of the longstanding international network, the Alliance for a Responsible, Plural and United World. He was Director of the world-governance think tank, the Forum for a new World Governance (FnWG) from 2007 to 2015. He is currently retired.

== Political prisoner under Pinochet's military regime in Chile ==
Born on April 24, 1950, in Antofagasta, in northern Chile. Today, he is married and has four children.

Of Quechua and Aymara descent, he was a student at the School of Sociology of the Catholic University until 1970. He quit school to live with the Mapuche people in southern Chile, where he was one of the main organizers of a widespread movement to recover land that had been taken away from the Mapuche communities by colonizers. He resisted against the coup led by Augusto Pinochet on September 11, 1973, and stayed underground until April 1974, when he was captured by the military intelligence services. He was detained for several months in the secret jails of the dictatorship then sentenced to a 20-year prison term by a military court. He was adopted by Amnesty International and other Human Rights organizations, which allowed him to be evacuated to France in November 1976.

== A political refugee in France ==
As a political refugee in France, he began working in 1977 as a telephone installer, while pursuing his higher education. He obtained a PhD in Economics from the University of Paris 8. From 1983 to 1986 he worked in the Development Department of the Cimade. He returned to Chile through Argentina in 1986. There, he worked at Pries-Cono Sur (South Cone Regional Social and Economic Research Program, a research network in economic, social, and political fields), as Coordinator of research centers, universities, labor unions, and NGOs in Argentina, Chile, Brazil, and Uruguay.

== Works in 1988 and 1991 ==
During this period, he published the following books, widely used as sources in academic works:

- Los grupos transnacionales y la crisis, Editorial Nueva América, Buenos Aires, 1988.
- Estado autoritario, deuda externa y grupos económicos, with Patricio Rozas, Ediciones Chile América CESOC, Santiago, 1988.
- El endeudamiento bancario de los grupos económicos, su incidencia en la crisis de pagos y las políticas des Estado de Chile, with Patricio Rozas, PRIES CONO SUR, Santiago, 1988.
- El mapa de la extrema riqueza: 10 años después, with Patricio Rozas, Ediciones Chile América CESOC, Santiago, 1989.
- "Chile Hacia el Siglo XXI: Crisis del Capitalismo y Recomposición de las clases sociales," Documentos de Trabajo no. 43, PRIES CONO SUR, Santiago, 1991.

== International solidarity network and the World Social Forum ==
In 1992, he returned to France and worked as Head of the Future of the Planet Program at the Charles Léopold Mayer Foundation for the Progress of Humankind, an independent foundation instituted under Swiss law and based in Paris. He has been Head of Programs at the same foundation since 2002. He was one of the organizers of the Alliance for a Responsible, Plural and United World and was a founding member of the International Council of the World Social Forum.

== Worldwide publication of his personal and political accounts ==
His Relatos íntimos de José Peralta, a personal account of his political activity and detainment, was published in Chile by Ediciones Tiempo Nuevo in 2003 and re-edited by Ediciones AYUN in 2009. It has been translated:

- into Portuguese, published in Brazil by Escrituras in 2003
- into English, published in India by Pipal Tree in 2004 as Singing in the Prison Shower
- into Chinese, published by Xinhua Press in 2006, and
- into French, published in Morocco by Tarik Editions in 2007 as Résistance et Espoir au Chili 1973 - 2007.

== Other activities and new world-governance think tank ==
Gustavo Marín has organized seminars and conferences on themes related to democracy, civil society, and governance in China, India, Iran, Lebanon, Mauritania, Rwanda, South Africa, Brazil, Chile, Colombia, Mexico, France, Spain, among other countries.

Late 2007, he launched, jointly with Arnaud Blin, the Forum for a new World Governance (FnWG), of which he was Director until April 2015. He published more than thirty Proposal Papers, and together with Arnaud Blin and a dozen collaborators he co-authored the Diccionario del Poder Mundial, published in Spanish by the Chilean edition of Le Monde Diplomatique and in French by the publisher Nuvis under the title Dictionnaire de la gouvernance mondiale.

== See also ==
- 1973 Chilean coup d'état
- Amnesty International
- Global governance
- Revolutionary Left Movement (Chile)
- World Social Forum
