= Arnaud Blin =

French-American historian and political scientist

Arnaud Blin is a French-American historian and political scientist. He has focused mainly on international relations and the history of war and peace, including the history of terrorism. He has published almost exclusively in French. His History of Terrorism (with G. Chaliand) was originally published in France and translated into English by the University of California Press.

Arnaud Blin blends historical analysis with current events and includes analysis of the Peace of Westphalia and the Westphalian system. He has written on the Battle of Jena and philosophical ideas such as the Hegelian idea of the end of history, or the Kantian theory of perpetual peace as applied to US Foreign policy through the doctrine of democratic peace.

He has worked for several research institutions, including the Institut Diplomacie et Défense, the French Institute for Strategic Analysis and the Ecole de la paix de Grenoble. Since 2008, he has been coordinator, with Gustavo Marín, of the Forum for a new World Governance.

Blin has degrees from Harvard University, Georgetown University and Tufts University.

== Publications ==
=== In French ===
- Comment Roosevelt fit entrer les Etats-Unis dans la guerre, André Versaille, février 2011 (ISBN 978-2-87495-129-9)
- Tamerlan, Perrin, April 2007 (ISBN 9782262022341)
- 11 septembre, la terreur démasquée, Cavalier Bleu, août 2006 (ISBN 2846701482)
- Collectif, 100 propositions du Forum Social Mondial, Charles Léopold Mayer Publishing, 2006 (ISBN 2-84377-114-5)
- Histoire du terrorisme, Bayard Culture, March 2006 (ISBN 2227475897)
- Le terrorisme, Cavalier Bleu, coll. Idées reçues, numéro 108, 128 p. (ISBN 2846701237)
- Le désarroi de la puissance, Les Etats-Unis vers la guerre permanente ?, Lignes De Repères, October 2004 (ISBN 291575201X)
- 1648, La paix en Westphalie, ou la naissance de l'Europe politique moderne, Complexe, coll. « Questions à L'histoire », 2006, 240 p. (ISBN 2804800881)

=== In English ===
- The History of Terrorism: From Antiquity to Al Qaeda, University of California Press, 2007
- War and Religion: Europe and the Mediterranean from the First through the Twenty-First Centuries, University of California Press, 2019.
