= 1608 =

1608 in various calendars
- Gregorian calendar: 1608; MDCVIII
- Ab urbe condita: 2361
- Armenian calendar: 1057; ԹՎ ՌԾԷ
- Assyrian calendar: 6358
- Balinese saka calendar: 1529–1530
- Bengali calendar: 1014–1015
- Berber calendar: 2558
- English Regnal year: 5 Ja. 1 – 6 Ja. 1
- Buddhist calendar: 2152
- Burmese calendar: 970
- Byzantine calendar: 7116–7117
- Chinese calendar: 丁未年 (Fire Goat); 4305 or 4098 — to — 戊申年 (Earth Monkey); 4306 or 4099
- Coptic calendar: 1324–1325
- Discordian calendar: 2774
- Ethiopian calendar: 1600–1601
- Hebrew calendar: 5368–5369
- Hindu calendars
- Vikram Samvat: 1664–1665
- Shaka Samvat: 1529–1530
- Kali Yuga: 4708–4709
- Holocene calendar: 11608
- Igbo calendar: 608–609
- Iranian calendar: 986–987
- Islamic calendar: 1016–1017
- Japanese calendar: Keichō 13 (慶長１３年)
- Javanese calendar: 1528–1529
- Julian calendar: Gregorian minus 10 days
- Korean calendar: 3941
- Minguo calendar: 304 before ROC 民前304年
- Nanakshahi calendar: 140
- Thai solar calendar: 2150–2151
- Tibetan calendar: མེ་མོ་ལུག་ལོ་ (female Fire-Sheep); 1734 or 1353 or 581 — to — ས་ཕོ་སྤྲེ་ལོ་ (male Earth-Monkey); 1735 or 1354 or 582

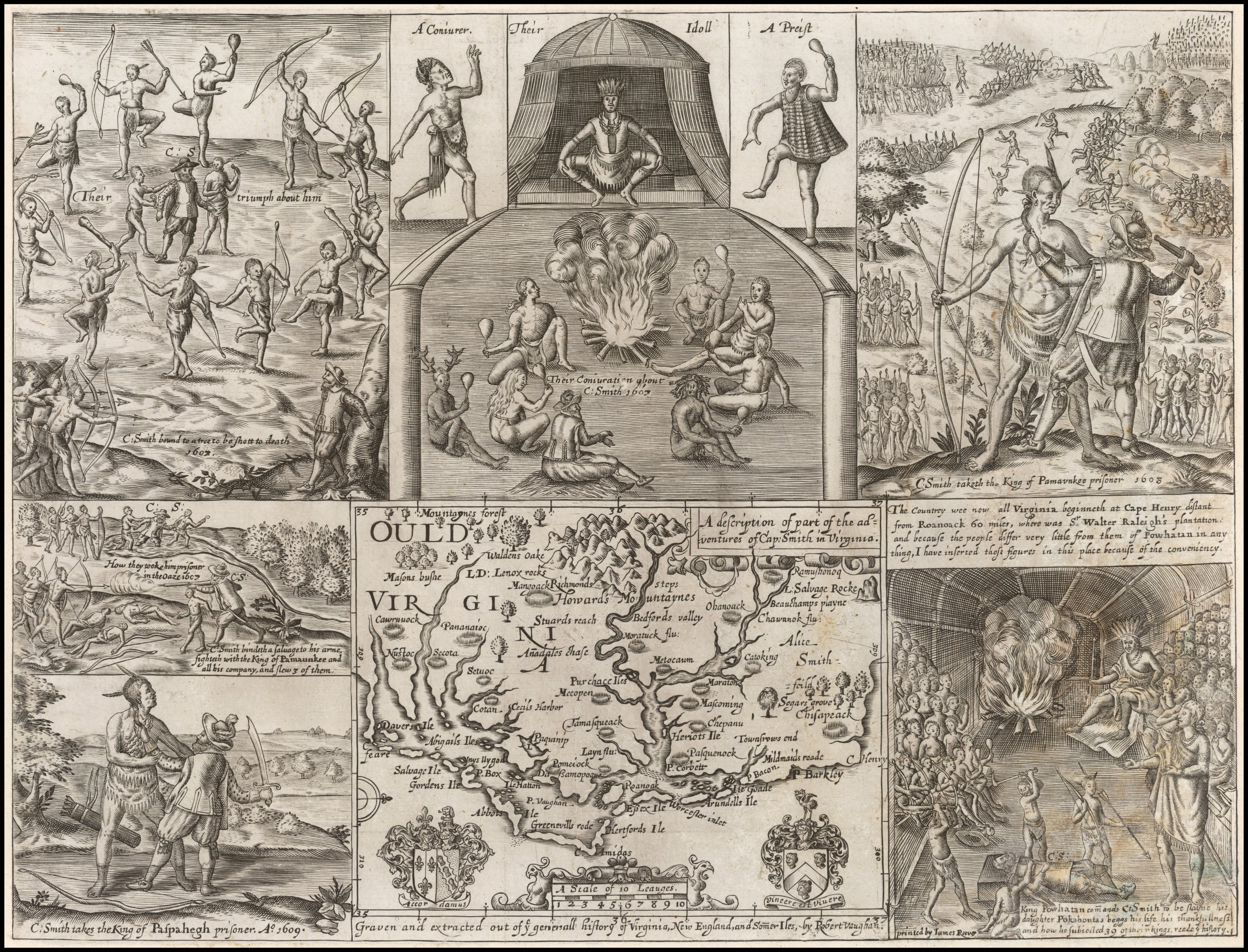
January 11: Jamestown's John Smith released from imprisonment by Chief Powhatan

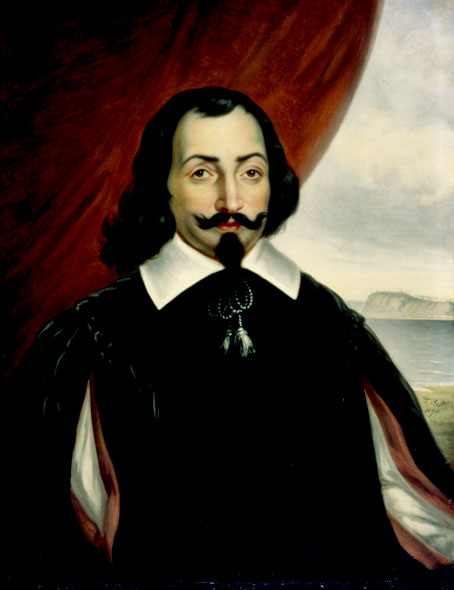
July 3: Samuel de Champlain founds Quebec City.

1608 (MDCVIII) was a leap year starting on Tuesday of the Gregorian calendar and a leap year starting on Friday of the Julian calendar, the 1608th year of the Common Era (CE) and Anno Domini (AD) designations, the 608th year of the 2nd millennium, the 8th year of the 17th century, and the 9th year of the 1600s decade. As of the start of 1608, the Gregorian calendar was 10 days ahead of the Julian calendar, which remained in localized use until 1923.

== Events ==
=== January–March ===
- January 2 – The first of the Jamestown supply missions returns to the Colony of Virginia with Christopher Newport commanding the John and Francis and the Phoenix bringing about 100 new settlers to supplement the 38 survivors he finds at Jamestown.
- January 7 – At Jamestown, Virginia, fire destroys "all the houses in the fort"; the fort is repaired in March.
- January 11 – John Smith is released by Powhatan after 15 days of captivity, and arrives back at Jamestown the next day. Upon his return, instead of being welcomed, he is charged with negligence for the deaths of the two men with him at the time of his capture, Jehu Robinson and Thomas Emery, but later exonerated.
- January 17 – Emperor Susenyos I of Ethiopia defeats an Oromo army at Ebenat; 12,000 Oromo are reportedly killed at a cost of 400 Amhara.
- January 23 – Treaty of The Hague, a defensive alliance between France and the United Provinces of the Netherlands, is signed.
- February 6 – Gabriel Báthory makes an agreement with Hungarian mercenary soldiers, the Hajduk, in order to overthrow the government of Transylvania.
- February 7 – A peace conference opens at the Binnenhof at The Hague, in the Netherlands, to end a war between the Dutch Republic and the Spanish Netherlands (now Belgium).
- February 14 – The brutal winter of 1607–1608 in England ends after 10 weeks of sub-freezing temperatures.
- February 18 – Don Julius Caesar d'Austria, the illegitimate son of Rudolf II, Holy Roman Emperor, brutally murders his girlfriend, Markéta Pichlerová, then dismembers her body. Emperor Rudolf imprisons Julius for the rest of his life.
- February 26 – After being held captive in Morocco for more than 13 years, popular professor Malian Ahmad Baba is able to return to Timbuktu on 10 Dhu 'l-Qa'da 1016 A.H.
- March 5 – Sigismund Rákóczi, Prince of Transylvania, abdicates in favor of Gabriel Báthory in order to avoid a civil war.
- March 16 – Gwanghaegun becomes the new King of Korea upon the death of his father, King Seonjo, who had reigned for more than 40 years.
- March 18 – Susenyos is formally crowned Emperor of Ethiopia, at the ancient city of Axum.

=== April–June ===
- April 10 – Jamestown supply missions: Christopher Newport again sails for England, carrying Powhatan's tribesman Namontack for a visit to London.
- April 19 – The Burning of Derry launches O'Doherty's Rebellion in the Kingdom of Ireland.
- April 20 – Old Bushmills Distillery is first licensed to distil whiskey at Bushmills, County Antrim, Ireland by King James I.
- May 8 – A newly nationalized silver mine in Scotland at Hilderston, West Lothian is re-opened by Bevis Bulmer.
- May 14 – The Protestant Union is founded in Auhausen.
- June 15 – During a voyage in the Arctic Ocean, explorer Henry Hudson and the crew of the Hopewell sight what they claim to be a mermaid, swimming in the seas near Norway.
- June 26 – Matthias I, already King of Bohemia becomes the King of Hungary and the King of Croatia upon the abdication of both jobs by his older brother, Rudolf II, who continues as Holy Roman Emperor.

=== July–September ===
- July 3 – The settlement of Quebec City is founded by Samuel de Champlain.
- August 24 – The first official English representative to India, Captain William Hawkins, lands at Surat.
- September 10 – John Smith is elected council president of Jamestown, and begins expanding the fort.
- September 21 – The University of Oviedo in Spain is founded.
- September 23 – The siege of the Troitsky monastery by the Polish–Lithuanian Commonwealth begins in Russia north of Moscow, but fails after 16 months.

=== October–December ===
- October 1 – The second of the Jamestown supply missions, which set out in July from England, arrives at Jamestown, Virginia, with Christopher Newport commanding the Mary and Margaret carrying 70 settlers, bringing the population back up to 120; the passengers include two women and some skilled artisans, mostly from continental Europe, to develop industries.
- October 2 – Dutch lens maker Hans Lippershey demonstrates the first telescope in the Dutch Parliament.
- November 19 – In Budapest, the coronation ceremonies take place for Matthias to be crowned as King Mátyás II of Hungary.
- November 20 – Sir Thomas Gates, Governor of the London Company's colony at Jamestown, Virginia, is ordered by the Board of Directors to forcibly convert the native Indians in the area to Christianity as Anglicans.
- November 30 – At the colony of Portuguese Macau, a port leased from the Chinese Empire, a group of 100 Japanese samurai, wielding katana and muskets engage in a fight with musket-armed Portuguese soldiers commanded by Governor André Pessoa. Around 50 Japanese are killed and the others are imprisoned until they sign an affidavit blaming themselves for the incident. Tokugawa Ieyasu, the principal shogun of Japan, subsequently ends the "red seal ships" program of authorizing Japanese nationals to visit Macau. The incident eventually leads to much larger naval battle in 1610, the Nossa Senhora da Graça incident.
- December 13 – At the Morača monastery in Kolašin, in what is now the nation of Montenegro, Patriarch Jovan Kantul assembles the rebel leaders of Montenegro and Herzegovina. The group agrees with a representative of the Duchy of Savoy to deliver Duke Charles Emmanuel I a monarchy within the Balkans, in return for special privileges to the Serbian Orthodox Church.
- December 20 – Karl of the House of Liechtenstein founds the Principality of Liechtenstein within the Holy Roman Empire, an independent nation that will continue more than 400 years later between Austria and Switzerland.
- December – Jamestown supply missions: Christopher Newport returns to England from Jamestown carrying cargo with "tryals of Pitch, Tarre, Glasse, Frankincense, Sope Ashes ..."

=== Date unknown ===
- Spring – The Scrooby Congregation of Protestant English Separatists successfully flees to the Dutch Republic from the Humber, origin of the Pilgrim Fathers who in 1620 move on to North America.
- The first cheques are used in the Dutch Republic.
- The Uniform Land-Tax Law is imposed in Korea.
- Five royal schools in Ulster are given a Royal Charter by King James I.

== Births ==
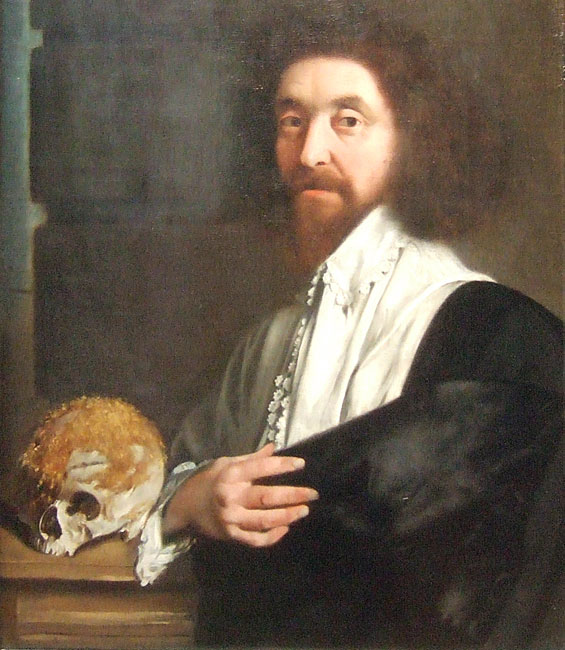
John Tradescant the Younger born 4 August

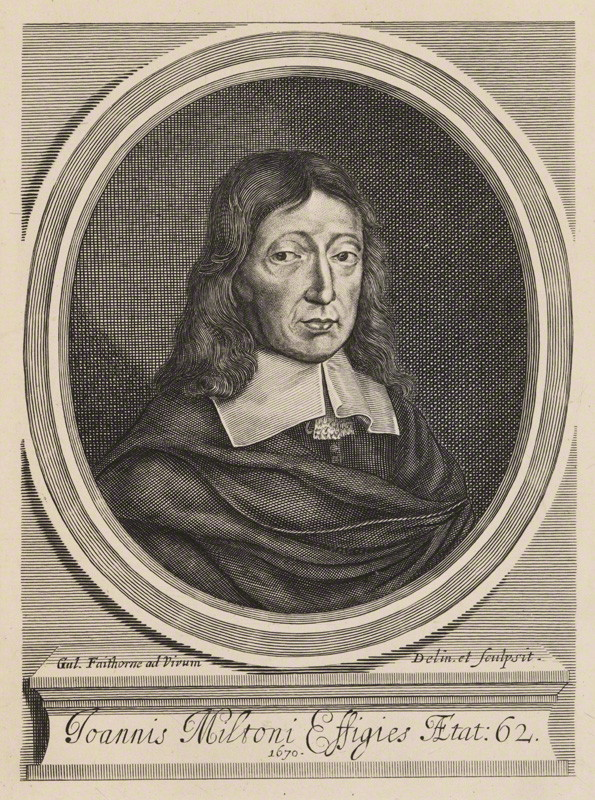
John Milton born 9 December

=== January–March ===
- January 10 – Henry Winthrop, governor of the Massachusetts Bay Company (d. 1630)
- January 14 – Francis Hawley, 1st Baron Hawley, English politician (d. 1684)
- January 21 – Theaurau John Tany, English Christian mystic (d. 1659)
- January 26 – Johannes Heinrich Ursinus, German Lutheran scholar (d. 1667)
- January 28 – Giovanni Alfonso Borelli, Italian physiologist and physicist (d. 1679)
- January 30 – John Oxenbridge, English Nonconformist divine (d. 1674)
- February 5 – Gaspar Schott, German Jesuit scholar (d. 1666)
- February 6 – António Vieira, Portuguese writer (d. 1697)
- February 12 – Daniello Bartoli, Italian Jesuit priest (d. 1685)
- February 20 – Arthur Capell, 1st Baron Capell of Hadham (d. 1649)
- February 21 – Elizabeth Barnard, Granddaughter of William Shakespeare (d. 1670)
- March 18 – Paul Ragueneau, French Jesuit missionary (d. 1680)
- March 27 – Thomas Rouse, English politician (d. 1676)
- March 28 – Léon Bouthillier, comte de Chavigny, French politician (d. 1652)

=== April–June ===
- April 13 – Cornelis Schrevel, Dutch scholar (d. 1664)
- April 14 – Illiam Dhone, Manx politician (d. 1663)
- April 15
  - Honoré Fabri, French mathematician (d. 1688)
  - John Huddleston, English monk of the Order of St. Benedict (d. 1698)
- April 20 – Edward Rainbowe, English clergyman and preacher (d. 1684)
- April 23 – Thomas Minor, American city founder (d. 1690)
- April 24 – Gaston, Duke of Orléans, third son of King Henry IV of France (d. 1660)
- May 1 – Pieter Post, Dutch architect, painter and printmaker (d. 1669)
- May 15 – René Goupil, French Jesuit lay missionary (d. 1642)
- June – Richard Fanshawe, English diplomat (d. 1666)
- June 19 (bapt.) – Thomas Fuller, English churchman and historian (d. 1661)

=== July–September ===
- July 13 – Ferdinand III, Holy Roman Emperor (d. 1657)
- July 14 – George Goring, Lord Goring, English Royalist soldier (d. 1657)
- July 24 – Sir Philip Wodehouse, 3rd Baronet, English baronet (d. 1681)
- August 4 – John Tradescant the Younger, British botanist (d. 1662)
- August 15 – Henry Howard, 22nd Earl of Arundel, English politician (d. 1652)
- August 16 – Jean-Louis Raduit de Souches, German Imperial field marshal (d. 1682)
- August 20 – Ludovicus a S. Carolo, French monk (d. 1670)
- August 30 – Alonso Perez de Leon, Spanish conquistador, explorer, man of letters (d. 1661)
- September 1 – Giacomo Torelli, Italian stage designer, engineer, and architect (d. 1678)
- September 15 – Niccolò Albergati-Ludovisi, Italian Catholic cardinal (d. 1687)
- September 17 – Cesare Facchinetti, Italian Catholic cardinal (d. 1683)
- September 19 – Alfonso Litta, Cardinal, Archbishop of Milan (d. 1679)
- September 20
  - Luis de Benavides Carrillo, Marquis of Caracena, Spanish general (d. 1668)
  - Jean-Jacques Olier, French Catholic priest (d. 1657)

=== October–December ===
- October 3 – Nicole, Duchess of Lorraine, French noble (d. 1657)
- October 15 – Evangelista Torricelli, Italian physicist and mathematician (d. 1647)
- October 18 – John Conant, English theologian, clergyman, and academic administrator (d. 1694)
- November 5 – Margareta Huitfeldt, Norwegian-Swedish noble (d. 1683)
- November 9 – Tiberio Fiorilli, Italian actor (d. 1694)
- November 10 – Eleanor of Anhalt-Zerbst, duchess by marriage of Schleswig-Holstein-Sønderburg-Norburg (d. 1681)
- November 13 (bapt.) – John Desborough, English soldier and politician (d. 1680)
- November 16 – Johann Freinsheim, German classical scholar, critic (d. 1660)
- November 23 – Francisco Manuel de Mello, Portuguese writer (d. 1666)
- December 6 – George Monck, 1st Duke of Albemarle, English soldier (d. 1670)
- December 8 – Vendela Skytte, Swedish noble (d. 1629)
- December 9 – John Milton, English poet (d. 1674)
- December 15
  - Joachim Lütkemann, German theologian (d. 1655)
  - John Tufton, 2nd Earl of Thanet, English earl (d. 1664)

=== Date unknown ===
- Thomas Barlow, Bishop of Lincoln, English churchman (d. 1691)
- Eudoxia Streshneva, Tsarina of Mikhail I of Russia (d. 1645)
- Ayşe Sultan and/or Hanzade Sultan, Ottoman princesses, daughters of Ahmed I

== Deaths ==
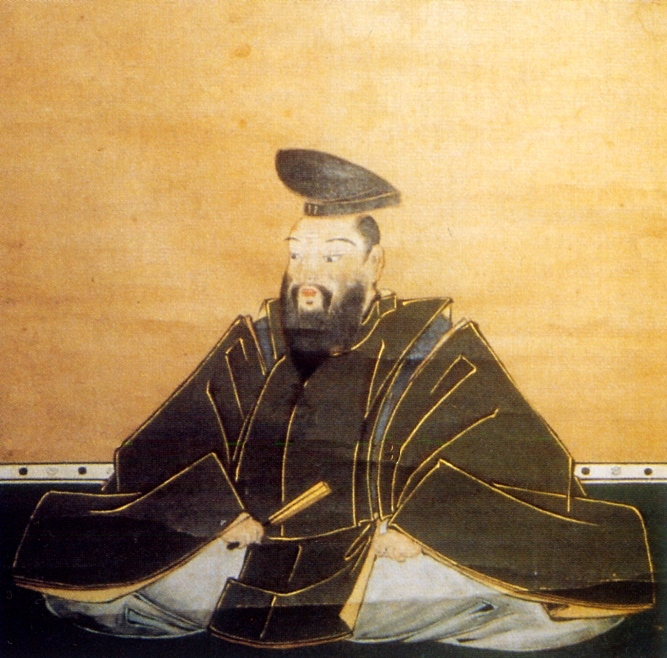
Tsugaru Tamenobu died 29 March

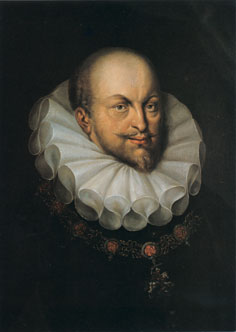
Frederick I, Duke of Württemberg died 29 January

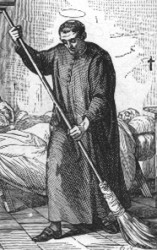
Francis Caracciolo died 4 June

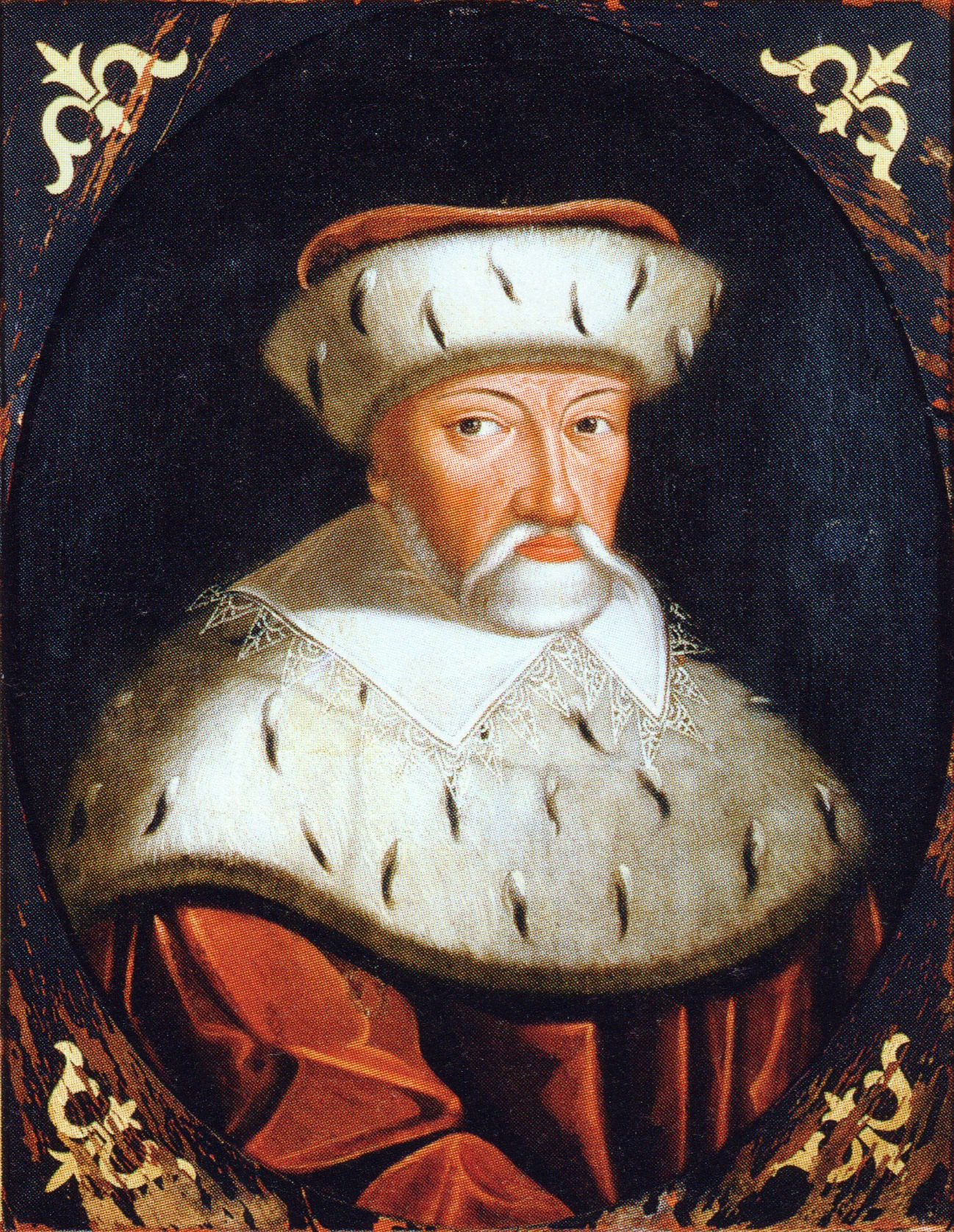
Joachim III Frederick, Elector of Brandenburg died 18 July

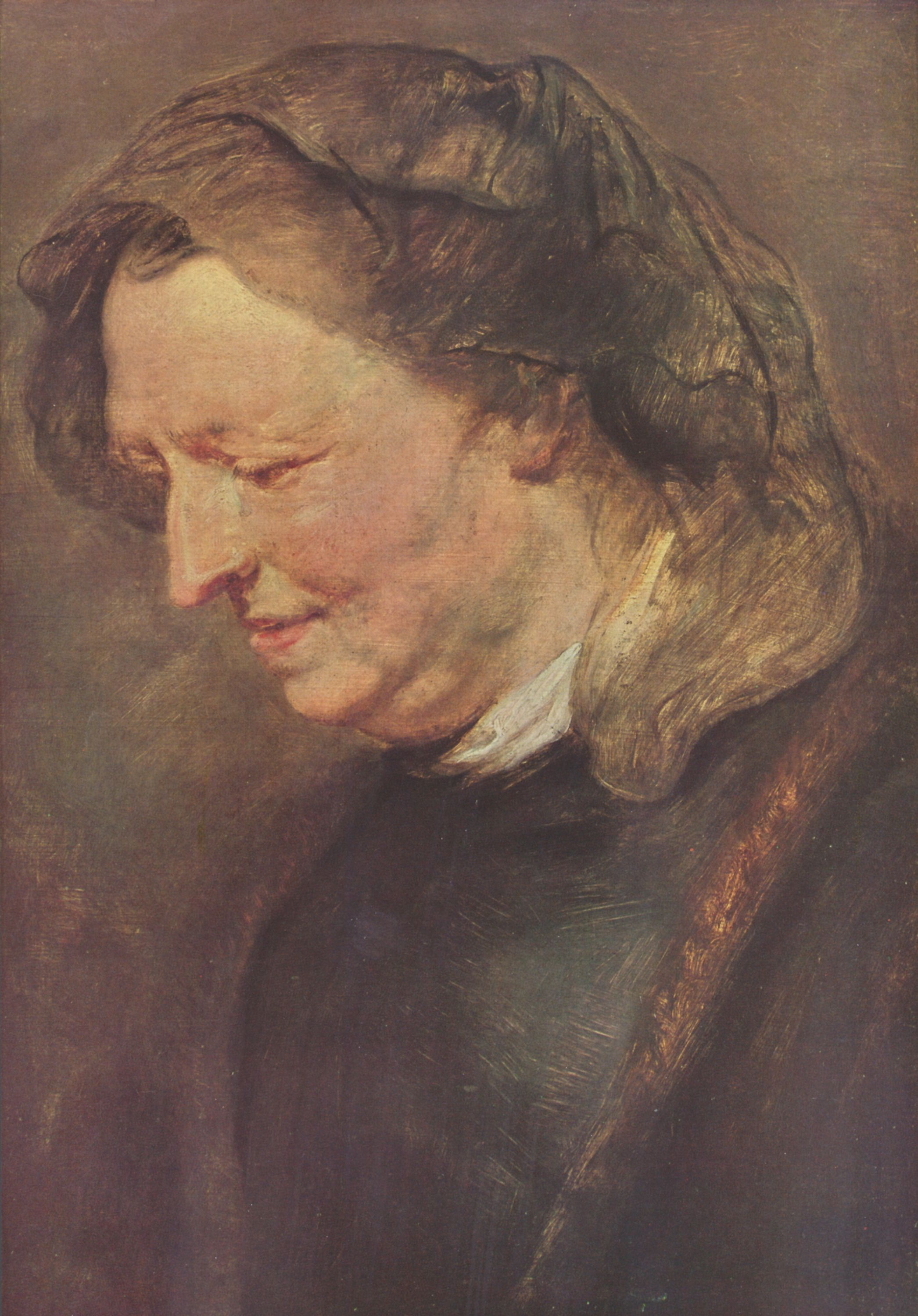
Maria Pypelinckx died 19 October

=== January–March ===
- January 4 – Peter Edgcumbe, English politician (b. 1536)
- January 18 – Jacques Couet, French pastor (b. 1546)
- January 19 – Bernard Maciejowski, Polish Catholic archbishop (b. 1548)
- January 28 – Enrique Henríquez, Portuguese theologian (b. 1536)
- January 29 – Frederick I, Duke of Württemberg, son of George of Mömpelgard and his wife Barbara of Hesse (b. 1557)
- February 13 – Konstanty Wasyl Ostrogski, Lithuanian prince (b. 1526)
- February 13 – Bess of Hardwick, Countess of Shrewsbury (b. 1527)
- February 26 – John Still, English Bishop of Bath and Wells, famed as a preacher (b. c. 1543)
- February 27 – Henri, Duke of Montpensier, French noble (b. 1573)
- March 12 – Kōriki Kiyonaga, Japanese warlord (b. 1530)
- March 16 – Seonjo of Joseon, King of Joseon (b. 1552)
- March 29
  - Laurence Tomson, English Calvinist theologian (b. 1539)
  - Tsugaru Tamenobu, Japanese daimyō (b. 1550)

=== April–June ===
- April 8 – Magdalen Dacre, English noble (b. 1538)
- April 9 – Pomponio Torelli, Italian writer (b. 1539)
- April 18 – Jakob Christoph Blarer von Wartensee, Roman Catholic bishop (b. 1542)
- April 19 – Thomas Sackville, 1st Earl of Dorset, English statesman and poet (b. 1536)
- April 29 – Maria Anna of Bavaria (b. 1551)
- May 11 – Giovanni Luca Conforti, Italian composer and singer (b. 1560)
- May 14 – Charles III of Lorraine, French duke (b. 1542)
- May 15 – Archibald Napier, Scottish landowner (b. 1534)
- May 22 – Juan Bautista Villalpando, Spanish architect and mathematician (b. 1552)
- June 1 – Marie Eleonore of Cleves, Duchess consort of Prussia (1573–1608) (b. 1550)
- June 4 – Francis Caracciolo, Italian Catholic priest (b. 1563)
- June 5 – Ippolito Andreasi, Italian painter (b. 1548)
- June 19
  - Alberico Gentili, Italian jurist (b. 1551)
  - Johann Pistorius, German historian (b. 1546)

=== July–September ===
- July 3 – William Barclay, Scottish academic lawyer (b. 1546)
- July 18 – Joachim Friedrich, Elector of Brandenburg (b. 1546)
- July 25 – Pomponio Nenna, Italian composer (b. 1556)
- July 30 – Rory O'Donnell, 1st Earl of Tyrconnell (b. 1575)
- August 13 – Giambologna, Italian sculptor (b. 1529)
- September 4 – Juan de Zúñiga y Avellaneda, Spanish nobleman (b. 1551)
- September 8 – Jerónimo Xavierre, Spanish cardinal (b. 1546)
- September 14 – Christoph Schissler, German scientific instrument maker (b. 1531)
- September 20 – Kanamori Nagachika, Japanese samurai (b. 1524)
- September 28 – Henri, Duke of Joyeuse, French general (b. 1563)

=== October–December ===
- October 11 – Giovanni Ambrogio Figino, Italian painter (b. c. 1549)
- October 17 – Luca Bati, Italian composer (b. 1546)
- October 19
  - Martin Delrio, Flemish theologian and occultist (b. 1551)
  - Geoffrey Fenton, English writer and politician (b. 1539)
  - Maria Pypelinckx, Dutch writer (b. 1538)
- October 26 – Philipp Nicolai, German Lutheran pastor (b. 1556)
- October 29 – John Smith, English politician (b. 1557)
- November 24 – Giovanni Battista Giorgi, Italian Catholic prelate who served as Bishop of Ston (1606–1608) (b. 1536)
- December 21 – William Davison, secretary to Queen Elizabeth I of England (b. c. 1541)
- December 29 – Martin Schalling the Younger, German theologian (b. 1532)

=== Date unknown ===
- George Bannatyne, collector of Scottish poems (b. 1545)
