= Kemankeş Kara Mustafa Pasha =

Grand Vizier of the Ottoman Empire from 1638 to 1644

Grand Vizier of the Ottoman Empire
- In office 23 December 1638 – 31 January 1644
- Monarchs: Murad IV; İbrahim
- Preceded by: Tayyar Mehmed Pasha
- Succeeded by: Semiz Mehmed Pasha

Kapudan Pasha
- In office 17 October 1635 – 22 December 1638
- Preceded by: Gazi Hüseyin Pasha
- Succeeded by: Gazi Hüseyin Pasha

Personal details
- Born: 1592 Avlonya, Ottoman Empire
- Died: 31 January 1644 (aged 51–52) Istanbul, Ottoman Empire

Military service
- Allegiance: Ottoman Empire
- Branch/service: Ottoman Navy; Ottoman Army
- Rank: Kapudan Pasha (grand admiral; 1635–1638); Janissary commander (1635)
- Battles/wars: Ottoman–Safavid War (1623–39): Capture of Baghdad

Kemankeş Kara Mustafa Pasha (Ottoman Turkish: ﻛﻤﺎﻧﻜﺶ قره مصطفى پاشا, lit. 'Mustafa Pasha, the Archer, the Courageous'; 1592 – 31 January 1644) was an Ottoman military officer and statesman who served as Kapudan Pasha and Grand Vizier of the Ottoman Empire.

== Early life ==
Mustafa was born to an Albanian family in Avlonya (present-day Vlorë in Albania) in 1592. He was an officer in the Janissary corps. His epithet, kemankeş (lit. 'bow-puller'), refers to his talent as an archer. He was the deputy (sekban başı) of the Janissary commander in 1634 and was promoted to the post of Agha of the Janissaries (yeniçeri ağası) in 1635. On 17 October 1635, he was appointed Kapudan Pasha (Grand Admiral of the Navy). Nevertheless, he participated in the 1638 Capture of Baghdad far from the sea. On 24 December 1638, following the death of the then-Grand Vizier Tayyar Mehmet Pasha during the siege, Sultan Murad IV appointed Kemankeş Mustafa as the new Grand Vizier, the highest post of the empire after the Sultan.

== As a grand vizier ==
Following the Ottoman conquest of Baghdad, Kemankeş Mustafa represented the Ottomans in the consequent peace talks. The resulting Treaty of Zuhab, signed on 17 May 1639 between the Ottoman and Safavid Empires, provided the outline for the border between Iran and the states of Turkey and Iraq that continues to be the basis of present-day common borders of the three nations.

Murad IV died on 9 February 1640, and Kemankeş Mustafa continued as Grand Vizier during Ibrahim's reign. Ibrahim was a weak sultan, and Kemankeş Mustafa became the de facto ruler of the empire. Using severe methods, he ended the rebellions, balanced the budget, and reduced the number of soldiers. He also used his power to subdue and cause the death of other able statesmen whom he considered to be potential competitors for his post.

== Death ==
Kemankeş Mustafa made many enemies. His most important opposition was a palace faction formed by Kösem Sultan (the sultan's mother), Turhan Sultan (the sultan's haseki), three daughters of Kösem Sultan (Ayşe Sultan, Fatma Sultan, and Hanzade Sultan), a charlatan named Djindji Hodja, and a vizier named Semiz Mehmed Pasha. They began to criticize Kemankeş Mustafa vehemently. Although he submitted his resignation several times, it was not accepted by the Sultan. However, the Sultan, who was initially pleased with Kemankeş Mustafa, finally dismissed him on 31 January 1644. A few hours later, he was executed.

== Legacy ==
In 1640, Mustafa Pasha converted a Roman Catholic church in Istanbul into a mosque named Odalar Mosque located in the Üsküdar district. According to architectural historian Semavi Eyice, the original church, a Byzantine one, was probably the Monastery of Philanthropos but was converted to the Latin church and renamed Santa Maria di Constantinopoli during the reign of Mehmed II.

Around the same time, Mustafa Pasha commissioned another mosque, the eponymous Kemankeş Kara Mustafa Paşa Mosque, to be built in Karaköy, a former Genoese trading colony. The site of the mosque was previously occupied by the Genoese Saint Antonio Church, which was appropriated in 1606 and demolished thereafter. The mosque was mostly rebuilt in 1771.

In Istanbul, the present-day administrative neighborhood division encompassing Karaköy is named after him.

== Popular culture ==
- In the 2015 TV series Muhteşem Yüzyıl: Kösem, Kemankeş Kara Mustafa Pasha is portrayed by Turkish actor İsmail Demirci.

Military offices
Preceded by Gazi Hüseyin Pasha	Kapudan Pasha; 17 October 1635 – 22 December 1638	Succeeded by Gazi Hüseyin Pasha
Political offices
Preceded by Tayyar Mehmed Pasha	Grand Vizier of the Ottoman Empire; 23 December 1638 – 31 January 1644	Succeeded by Sultanzade Mehmed Pasha
