= Ladik (disambiguation) =

Ladik or Lâdik may refer to one of several cities and towns in Turkey and geographical features:

- Ladik, Samsun Province, the ancient Laodicea Pontica
- Ladik Lake, lake in Samsun Province
- Denizli Ladik, usually called just Denizli, near Laodicea on the Lycus
  - Beylik of Ladik: 14th century Anatolian beylik, also called İnançoğlu, founded in Denizli and surroundings, in Turkey's Aegean Region

== See also ==
- Oleg Ladik (born 1971), Ukrainian-born Canadian Olympic wrestler
- Katalin Ladik (born 1942), Hungarian poet, writer, performance artist
