= Siege of Baghdad (1638) =

Part of the Ottoman–Safavid War (1623–1639)

- Part of the Ottoman–Safavid War (1623–1639)
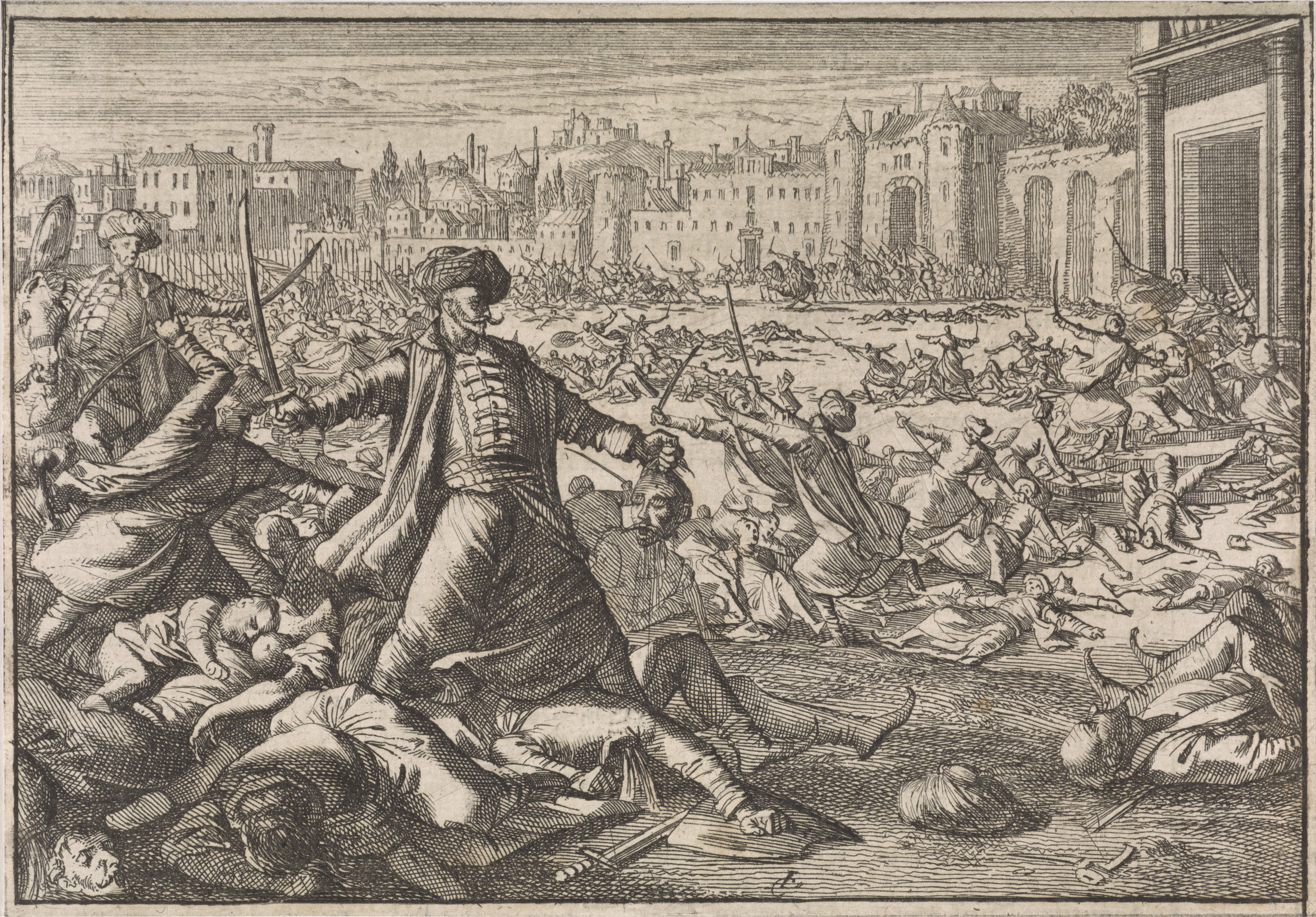
- Conquest of Baghdad by the Ottoman in 1638, by Caspar Luyken, 1896.
| Date | 15 November – 25 December 1638 |
| Location | Baghdad 33.35°N 44.41667°E |
| Result | Ottoman victory |
| Territorial changes | The Ottomans re-capture Baghdad and re-establish Ottoman Iraq |

Belligerents
| Safavid Empire | Ottoman Empire |

Commanders and leaders
| Bektash Khan Gorji (POW); Khalil Khan (POW); Naqdi Khan (POW); Ali Yar Khan (POW); Saru Khan † | Sultan Murad IV; Grand Vizier Tayyar Mehmed Pasha †; Grand Vizier Kemankeş Kara Mustafa Pasha |

Strength
| 40,000 infantry 211 fortified city towers 100 cannons | 108,589 (35,000 infantry and 73,589 cavalry): 88,000 engaged 200 cannons |

Casualties and losses
| 20,000+ Massacred | Heavy |
- Most of the city residents were massacred by the Ottomans after the capture

The siege of Baghdad (Persian: محاصره بغداد) in the winter of 1638 marked the re-establishment of Ottoman control over Iraq, following a prior period of Safavid rule. It was part of the Ottoman–Safavid War of 1623–1639.

== Background ==
Baghdad, once the capital of the Arab Abbasid Caliphate, was one of the most important cities of the medieval Muslim World. In the second half of the Medieval age, the Turkic dynasties (Seljuks, Kara Koyunlu, Ak Koyunlu) and others tried to gain control over this prestigious city.

From 1508 till 1534 it was ruled by the emerging Safavid dynasty of Iran, which at the time was led by shah Ismail I and shah Tahmasp I successively. In 1534, the Ottoman sultan Süleyman I (Turkish: Kanuni Sultan Süleyman) captured the city without any serious combat during the War of 1532-1555, which was confirmed in the resulting Peace of Amasya. However, 90 years later it was recaptured by Abbas I of Persia.

Attempts by several Ottoman commanders (Turkish: serdar) to retake the city following 1624, were fruitless. In 1638 Ottoman Sultan Murad IV (great-great-great-grandson of Süleyman I) decided to recapture the city. According to legend, only the sultan in-person, could conquer the city. Murad was seen as a warrior hero and thus it seemed as his duty to personally lead this campaign and regain Baghdad. He had been victorious against the Druze rebels a decade earlier and won an important victory at the siege of Yerevan in 1635.

According to the eyewitness account of Zarain Agha, the Ottoman mobilization for the siege of Baghdad was 108,589 men composed of 35,000 infantry, in part Janissaries, and 73,589 cavalry.

== Siege ==
The siege began on 15 November 1638. The Safavids had increased the garrison size of the city by around 4-5 times. There were four main gates of the city, the North Gate, Azamiye or Imam-i Azam, (of Abū Ḥanīfa), the South Gate Karanlık (dark), Ak (white) and Köprü (bridge) gates. The Ottoman observer Ziyaeddin Ibrahim Nuri described the city's fortifications as follows: the city walls were 25 metres (82 ft) tall and between 10 and 7 metres (33 and 23 ft) wide, reinforced by earthen ramparts to withstand artillery bombardment and protected by a wide and deep moat. The city walls featured 114 towers between the North and South Gate, and another 94 towers that ran parallel to the Tigris. The Safavid commander, Bektash Khan, had made extensive repairs to the fortifications. Two Pashas were deployed against the first two gates. But the Grand Vizier Tayyar Mehmet Pasha noticed that these two gates were very well fortified. So he chose to attack on the third (Ak) gate which seemed less fortified. During the siege the Safavids made sallies of around 6,000 men at a time, this was followed by a retreat into the city and a fresh 6,000 to attack. These types of attacks greatly increased the casualties of the Ottomans. The siege continued for 40 days. Towards the end, impatient Murad urged the Grand Vizier for a general attack. The attack was successful and the city was captured on 25 December 1638 (on the 116th anniversary of the capture of Rhodes by Suleyman I). But during the final clashes, the Grand Vizier was shot down.

== Aftermath ==
Although the defenders were given free passage to Persia, some resumed fighting after the capture of the city around Karanlık gate. The human loss during the after-capture fighting was severe, with the Ottomans characteristically raping and massacring the population, and sacking the city. Nevertheless, soon after the capture, the new Grand Vizier Kemankeş Mustafa Pasha and the Persian representative Saruhan began peace talks and on 17 May 1639 the treaty of Zuhab was signed, which became an important historical treaty. By this treaty the modern Turkey-Iran and Iraq-Iran frontier lines were drawn. Although there were some other wars after the treaty of Zuhab, the treaties following the wars were merely the ratification of the treaty of Zuhab.

== Trivia ==
During the Baghdad campaign Murad lost two of his Grand Viziers. The first was Bayram Pasha on 17 August 1638, who died on the way to Baghdad and the second was Tayyar Mehmed Pasha who died on 24 December 1638. Tayyar Mehmed was also the third Ottoman Grand Vizier who died on the battlefield (the first two being Hadim Ali Pasha in 1511 and Hadim Sinan Pasha in 1517).

After this victory, Murad had two magnificent kiosks built in the Topkapi gardens, one for his victory at Yerevan and the other for his victory at Baghdad.

== See also ==
- History of Baghdad

== Sources ==
- Kia, Mehrdad (2017). The Ottoman Empire: A Historical Encyclopedia. ABC-CLIO. ISBN 978-1610693899.
