= Hanzade Sultan =

Hanzade Sultan may refer to:

- Hanzade Sultan (daughter of Ahmed I) (1607-1650), Ottoman princess
- Hanzade Sultan (daughter of Şehzade Ömer Faruk) (1923-1998), Ottoman princess, Egyptian princess consort
