= Kaya Sultan =

Daughter of Ottoman Sultan Murad IV

- Born: c. 1630/1633; Istanbul, Ottoman Empire
- Died: 28 February 1658 (age 24–28); Istanbul
- Burial: Ibrahim's türbesi, Hagia Sophia, Istanbul
- Spouse: Melek Ahmed Pasha (m. 1644)
- Issue: Fatma Afife Hanımsultan; Sultanzade Abdullah Bey; Fülane Hanımsultan
Names
- Turkish: Ismihan Kaya Sultan; Ottoman Turkish: اسمیخان کایا سلطان
- Dynasty: Ottoman
- Father: Murad IV
- Religion: Sunni Islam

Ismihan Kaya Sultan (Ottoman Turkish: کایا سلطان; c. 1630/1633 – 28 February 1658) was an Ottoman princess, the daughter of Sultan Murad IV.

The famed Ottoman traveler Evliya Çelebi noted a specific encounter with Kaya Sultan in his Book of Travels. An entire chapter of the book is dedicated to Kaya Sultan, from her pregnancy to her death. She was the most famous child of Murad IV and the favorite granddaughter of Kösem Sultan.

== Early life ==
Kaya was born to Sultan Murad IV between 1630 and 1633. The marriage of princesses for political ends had always been used by the sultans, and Kaya was no exception. In the early 1640s, Kösem Sultan triumphed over Kaya's mother, a concubine of her recently deceased son Murad IV in a dispute over the marital fortunes of Kaya Sultan. Kaya Sultan’s mother wanted her to marry one of her own political friends, the previous sultan's Silahdar (sword-bearer), Mustafa Pasha. Apparently it was also the will of the late Murad IV, and the candidate was liked by Kaya, who declared she would marry no one but him, and Kaya's mother also tried to influence the new Sultan Ibrahim I to support her, but Kösem's nominee, Melek Ahmed, won out. Aged between 11 and 14 years, Kaya was married to Melek Ahmed Pasha, a future Ottoman Grand Vizier of Abkhazian origin, who was in his mid-40s. The year of their marriage is given as August 1644. However, Kaya was extremely hostile towards her husband, as was evident on her wedding night when she stabbed him with a dagger, and declared that she would exercise her right as imperial princess to never consummate the marriage. In addition to her distaste for her husband, she stated that she had received a prophecy that she would die if she had a daughter with her husband. Melek Ahmed accepted this, also because he could not do anything else on account of his wife's higher rank.

== Married life ==
Despite the turbulent start, the marriage eventually turned out to be very happy. Melek Ahmed adored his wife and showered her with kindness and gifts, while Kaya discovered that she respected her husband and proved to be an excellent support to him, managing his assets and advising him on political matters, until his appointment as Grand Vizier. However, finally, after seven years, Kösem Sultan ordered both of them to consummate the wedding. Kaya obeyed and soon became pregnant, giving birth to a daughter. This made her forget the dire predictions about childbirth.

Evliya Çelebi regarded Kaya Sultan as a prime example of the dynasty's beneficence. He also noted that among all the princesses and their husbands, none got on as well as Kaya and Melek.

Elviya describes her as "a racing lioness, a true daughter of Sultan Murad" and recounts how, in the latter stages of her pregnancy, she rushed to Uskudar in a carriage to rescue her husband, who she was told was the target of an assassination attempt.

After the death of Kaya, Melek reportedly threw himself on her coffin and wept uncontrollably, a behavior strongly frowned upon by traditional Ottoman custom.

== Exile ==
In 1647 Ibrahim, who ascended the throne as sultan after the death of Kaya's father in 1640, and was mentally unstable, decided to legally marry his eighth Haseki, Hümaşah Sultan. Kaya, together with her aunts Ayşe Sultan, Fatma Sultan, and Hanzade Sultan had to suffer the humiliation of serving the bride as a handmaid, standing silently behind her, holding her jug, soap, basin and towel.

Despite this, Ibrahim was not satisfied, accused them of disrespecting his new wife, and exiled them to Edirne, confiscating their lands and jewels to give them to Hümaşah.

It is also reported that Ibrahim particularly hated Kaya.

Kaya returned with the others to Constantinople the following year, when Ibrahim was deposed and executed. His six-year-old son, Mehmed IV, ascended the throne, first under the regency of Kösem Sultan, grandmother of the new sultan, as well as Kaya, and then under Turhan Sultan, his own mother.

== Interpretations of her dreams ==
It is claimed in Evliya Celebi's book that Kaya experienced strange dreams and requested Melek to interpret them. Kaya stated that these dreams included her strolling in the gardens with her grandfather, Sultan Ahmed I. At the end of her dream, Ahmed passed his hand over Kaya's face in blessing, but the hand was immediately covered in blood. Kaya then proceeded to pass her own hand over her face and she too, was covered in blood. This is where the princess awoke with fright. Melek Ahmed instructed Kaya to give 1000 gold pieces to the poor as alms, 2000 to her interior aghas and exterior aghas, as well as 300 to Evliya Celebi and 100 to Evliya's sister. Kaya Sultan did as she was instructed. Later, Melek revealed to Evliya that when Kaya Sultan was to give birth, she would bleed to death.

Shortly after this initial interpretation, Kaya had another dream to be interpreted by Melek. Melek attempted to relieve the princess of her stress by stating that her second dream was nothing to worry about. However, Kaya had seen the expression on Melek's face during his interpretation and knew that he was not interpreting the dream properly. This resulted in Kaya growing increasingly more pious, with numerous donations to Mecca and Medina. What was discovered from this was that Kaya Sultan was the wealthiest of all the princesses from her period. This was demonstrated through her enormous donations and her turning over all her property to her children and to her and Melek's servants. She also insisted that should her line end, all the revenues from those lands should go to the Holy Cities.

== Death ==
Twenty-six days following the alleged dream experienced by Melek Ahmed, which supposedly foresaw the death of Kaya Sultan during childbirth, Kaya Sultan was due and gave birth to a daughter. Melek gave away numerous alms following the birth of his daughter.

However, there would be complications following the birth of Kaya's daughter. Her placenta remained in her womb and "got stuck to her heart". That night, all the servants and midwives in the palace attempted everything to free the placenta. These included placing Kaya in blankets and shaking her extremely hard, hanging her upside down and filling a honey barrel with orange-flower water and placing her inside of it. For three days and three nights, Kaya had to endure this torture. In a desperate attempt, the midwives covered their arms with almond oil and placed their hands into the princess' uterus and pulled out pieces of skin, including what looked like liver and rennet.

Four days after giving birth, Kaya Sultan died on the 28 February 1658.

She was buried in her uncle Ibrahim I's türbe, in the Mosque Hagia Sofia.

=== After death ===
Princesses were not treated differently from other ruling elite families. The state often regarded the vast wealth of the princesses to be loaned to them. After Kaya Sultan's death, grand vizier Koprulu Mehmed Pasha ordered the seizure of Kaya's fortunes, despite the existence of Kaya's husband and her daughter.

This was in accordance with the Ottoman landholding system, the Timar System. In the Timar System, land is redistributed after the death of an individual, rather than being passed on to future generations. If future generations prove to be beneficial to the empire, the Sultan could distribute other plots of land to these individuals.

Her spouse remarried her aunt, Fatma Sultan, in what was reported to be an unhappy marriage.

== Issue ==
By her marriage, Kaya had a son and two daughters:

- Fatma Afife Hanımsultan (1652 - 1727). She married Süleyman Pasha. She was the stepmother of his children by his first marriage, Mahmud Bey and Ahmed Bey, but she appears to have had no children of her own. She was very devoted and took care of her mother's charitable foundations after her death. She was buried in the Şehzade Mosque.
- Sultanzade Abdullah Bey (1655 - 1655). Born prematurely at seven months, he lived less than a day.
- Fülane Hanımsultan (24 February 1658 - 1658?). Kaya died four days after her birth. As there is no information about her, she is supposed to have died with her mother or shortly thereafter.

== See also ==
- List of Ottoman princesses

== Bibliography ==
- Çelebi, Evliya (1991) [1659]. "Kaya Sultan (1659): In The Intimate Life of an Ottoman Statesman: Melek Ahmed Pasha (1588–1662)". In Dankoff, Robert (ed.). Book of Travels (Seyahat-Name). Albany: SUNY Press. pp. 221–236.
- Peirce, Leslie P. (1993). The imperial harem : women and sovereignty in the Ottoman Empire. New York. ISBN 0-19-507673-7. OCLC 27811454.
- Uluçay, M. Çağatay (2011). Padişahların kadınları ve kızları. Ötüken. ISBN 978-9-754-37840-5.
