= Siege of Erivan =

Siege of Erivan/Yerevan may refer to:

- Siege of Erivan (1604) Ottoman–Safavid War
- Siege of Erivan (1616–1617), Ottoman-Safavid War
- Siege of Erivan (1635) Ottoman–Safavid War
- Siege of Erivan (1636) Ottoman–Safavid War
- Siege of Erivan (1804) Russo-Persian War
- Siege of Erivan (1808) Russo-Persian War
- Capture of Erivan Russo-Persian War
