= Black Archer (disambiguation) =

Black Archer refers to the final alias of Marvel Comics′ Golden Archer

Black Archer may also refer to:

- The second, African-American superhero named Black Archer slated to appear in Marvel's Supreme Power universe
- Black Archer (film), a 1959 Italian Sword-and-sandal-film

== See also ==
- Black Mustafa Pasha the Archer, an epithet of Kemankeş Mustafa Pasha
