= Kara Mustafa Pasha (governor of Egypt) =

Kara · Damat Mustafa Pasha

Ottoman Governor of Egypt
- In office 16 February 1624 – 16 May 1626
- Monarch: Murad IV
- Preceded by: Çeşteci Ali Pasha
- Succeeded by: Bayram Pasha
- In office 20 July 1623 – 9 October 1623
- Monarchs: Mustafa I Murad IV
- Preceded by: Silahdar Ibrahim Pasha
- Succeeded by: Çeşteci Ali Pasha

Personal details
- Died: 1628
- Spouse: Fatma Sultan (m. 1623)

Kara Mustafa Pasha (died 1628) was an Ottoman statesman who served twice as the Ottoman governor of Egypt, firstly from 20 July to 9 October 1623 and secondly from 12 February 1624 to 16 May 1626. He also served earlier as the agha (chief) of the Janissary corps in 1623.

Mustafa Pasha was educated in the Enderun palace school. He married Fatma Sultan, a daughter of Sultan Ahmed I, in 1623. He was executed in 1628 by the reigning Sultan (and his new brother-in-law) Murad IV.

== First term ==
After taking office as governor of Egypt for the first time, he accused his predecessor Silahdar Ibrahim Pasha of failing to pay the customary contribution of every governor of Egypt to the treasury. He sent his kaymakam (lieutenant) Salih Bey after Ibrahim Pasha, who told Salih Bey that whatever money he owed, he would give directly to the sultan in Istanbul, where he was headed anyway. However, the deposition of the Sultan Mustafa I and the succession of Murad IV to the throne, as well as the political chaos around the event that occurred before Ibrahim Pasha arrived back in Constantinople, allowed him to keep the money.

== Controversy over replacement ==
When the sultan replaced Mustafa Pasha with Çeşteci Ali Pasha after only five months in office, as the custom of the sultans was to change the governors of Egypt in rapid succession, the local Ottoman troops marched to the new kaymakam's house and demanded the bonus salaries they usually received when the governor was replaced. The new kaymakam delayed them until the next day and at the same time asked them to bring Mustafa Pasha to him, as the kaymakam's initial task was to analyze the affairs of Mustafa Pasha; one of the paintings belonging to the seraglio was lost, and it was suspected that Mustafa Pasha had taken it for himself. However, the army refused this request, telling him,

"We cannot seize the person of the vizier, nor make any inquiry after his effects; let them appoint sanjak-beys for guards, and let them conduct him to Alexandria. If [Çeşteci] Ali Pasha is already arrived in that city, they will put him into his hands; if they do not find him there, let them conduct him to Constantinople."

The entire army then reportedly swore on the Quran to be resolute in their will. The next day, 11 October 1623, the armies and the sanjak-beys had Mustafa Pasha read the sultan's orders for his replacement and audit. When the army members again demanded compensation from the new kaymakam and deputy governor, they reproached the soldiers by saying that they constantly demanded the same thing every three months, to which the soldiers replied,

"Why, then, does the sultan, our master, change the beylerbeys (governors) of the province every three months, to the great injury of the inhabitants? If he chooses to nominate every day new beylerbeys, we shall also demand every day new contributions."

When the deputy governor replied that he could not compensate the soldiers until the new governor arrived in Cairo, the soldiers grew enraged and nearly killed him and the kaymakam before they escaped. The soldiers then declared, "We will have no other governor than Mustafa; let Ali return to the place from whence he came."

As the soldiers welcomed Mustafa Pasha back as governor, he privately wrote to the sultan to ask for a confirmation of his re-commencement of the office, with many local figures also writing to the sultan on his behalf. When the soldiers were informed that the now-unemployed replacement governor Çeşteci Ali Pasha had landed in Alexandria, they sent messengers to inform him of what had occurred. Ali Pasha, angry at the news, proceeded to put one of the messengers in chains, but the troops in the area loyal to Mustafa Pasha released the messenger, destroyed Ali Pasha's camp, and forced him to reembark on his ship. When a wind accidentally brought his ship back to the port, Mustafa Pasha had his troops fire cannonballs at the ship. Because of unfavorable wind conditions, Ali Pasha was forced to spend the winter in another port before heading back to Constantinople.

No news arrived from the capital confirming or denying whether Mustafa Pasha was the rightful governor, and the populace began to grow uneasy. Finally, on 16 February 1624, a carrier pigeon arrived with a letter from the sultan in Constantinople confirming the reinstatement, and soon afterwards, the chief footman of the sultan arrived to deliver Mustafa Pasha's governor's caftan.

== Second term ==
In the first year (1624) of Mustafa Pasha's second term as governor of Egypt, the Nile flooded to higher-than-expected level, but the waters receded in time for sowing, and a successful harvest followed. Mustafa Pasha reportedly confiscated the inheritances of a large number of wealthy Egyptians for himself, growing wealthy from the practice; when heirs existed, he would reportedly fake their seal and claim their money. Furthermore, the province of Egypt experienced a plague from November 1625 to June 1626, which, although largely restricted to affecting those over 60 years old, nevertheless reportedly killed approximately 300,000 people. To mollify and hasten the grieving process (and possibly to avoid further contagion from corpses), Mustafa Pasha banned all funerals, and the bodies were carried through the streets and buried without ceremony. Mustafa Pasha was dismissed from the office of governor for the second and final time on 16 May 1626.

== Later life ==
After leaving office, Mustafa Pasha was hounded by his successor Bayram Pasha, who demanded of him a large restitution (reported as 20 sandıks) after auditing the treasury, in a way similar to what Mustafa Pasha himself had done to his own predecessor Silahdar Ibrahim Pasha. Mustafa Pasha, acting as though he could not pay the amount (despite the wealth he had apparently amassed while in office), sold his belongings to further his ruse. However, Bayram Pasha did not let up until Mustafa Pasha paid the entire sum.

In 1623, Mustafa Pasha married Fatma Sultan, a daughter of the late Sultan Ahmed I, but in 1628, he was executed by the reigning 16-year-old Sultan Murad IV (and his newlywed wife's brother) for some action "contrary to the law of God."

== See also ==
- List of Ottoman governors of Egypt

== Sources ==
- Schemseddin Mohammed ben Abilsorour al Bakeri al Sadiki (1789). "The Book of the Wandering Stars". In de Sacy, Antoine Isaac Silvestre (ed.). Accounts and Extracts of the Manuscripts in the Library of the King of France. Vol. 2. R. Faulder.

Political offices
Preceded by Silahdar Ibrahim Pasha	Ottoman Governor of Egypt; 20 July 1623 – 9 October 1623	Succeeded by Çeşteci Ali Pasha
Preceded by Çeşteci Ali Pasha	Ottoman Governor of Egypt; 16 February 1624 – 16 May 1626	Succeeded by Bayram Pasha
