= Bayram Pasha =

Grand Vizier of the Ottoman Empire from 1637 to 1638

Damat Ladikli Bayram Pasha

Grand Vizier of the Ottoman Empire
- In office 2 February 1637 – 26 August 1638
- Monarch: Murad IV
- Preceded by: Tabanıyassı Mehmed Pasha
- Succeeded by: Tayyar Mehmed Pasha

Ottoman Governor of Egypt
- In office 1626–1628
- Preceded by: Kara Mustafa Pasha
- Succeeded by: Tabanıyassı Mehmed Pasha

Personal details
- Born: Ladik, Ottoman Empire
- Died: 26 August 1638 Urfa, Ottoman Empire
- Spouse: Hanzade Sultan (m. 1623)
- Children: Fülane Hanımsultan

Ladikli Damat Bayram Pasha (Ottoman Turkish: بایرام پاشا, died 26 August 1638) was Grand Vizier of the Ottoman Empire from 1637 to 1638 and the Ottoman governor of Egypt from 1626 to 1628.

== Life ==
Bayram, was from Ladik, near the Anatolian city of Samsun. He was of Turkish origin. In 1622, his title was turnacıbaşı (chief of recruiting teams), and in 1623, the kethüda (chamberlain). In 1625, he was appointed to Egypt (then an Ottoman territory) as the beylerbey (governor-general). In 1628, he was promoted to the rank of vizier. In 1635, Bayram Pasha was the kaymakam (a title almost equivalent to modern mayor) of the Ottoman capital, Constantinople. In 1637, during the reign of Murad IV (1623–1640), he was promoted to the rank of grand vizier, the highest office in the empire next to that of the sultan. Bayram Pasha participated in the Baghdad campaign led by the sultan. He died (of natural causes) near Urfa.

== As a groom ==
Bayram was also a damat (groom) of the palace. In Ottoman tradition, the daughters and sisters of the sultans usually married viziers. But Bayram's case was an exception, because Bayram was married to Hanzade Sultan, the daughter of Ahmed I (1603–1617) in 1623 while he was still a turnacıbaşı. They had a daughter.

== In popular culture ==
- In the 2015 TV series Muhteşem Yüzyıl: Kösem, Bayram Pasha was portrayed by Turkish actor Asil Büyüközçelik.

== See also ==
- List of Ottoman grand viziers
- List of Ottoman governors of Egypt
- Bayrampaşa District in Istanbul

Political offices
Preceded by Kara Mustafa Pasha	Ottoman Governor of Egypt; 1626–1628	Succeeded by Tabanıyassı Mehmed Pasha
Preceded by Tabanıyassı Mehmed Pasha	Grand Vizier of the Ottoman Empire; 2 February 1637 – 26 August 1638	Succeeded by Tayyar Mehmed Pasha
