= 1668 North Anatolia earthquake =

Most powerful earthquake in Turkish history

- Location within Turkey
- Local date: 17 August 1668
- Local time: Late morning
- Magnitude: 7.8–8.0 M_{s}
- Epicentre: 40.9°N 36.0°E
- Fault: North Anatolian Fault
- Type: Strike-slip
- Areas affected: North Anatolia, Ottoman Empire
- Max. intensity: MMI IX (Violent)
- Tsunami: Yes
- Landslides: Yes
- Foreshocks: Yes
- Aftershocks: Continued for 6 months
- Casualties: 8,000 dead

Northern Anatolia was struck by a large earthquake on 17 August 1668 in the late morning. It had an estimated magnitude in the range 7.8–8.0 M_{s} and the maximum felt intensity was IX on the Modified Mercalli intensity scale. The epicenter of the earthquake was on the southern shore of Ladik Lake. It caused widespread damage from as far west as Bolu and as far east as Erzincan, resulting in about 8,000 deaths. It is thought to be the most powerful earthquake in Turkey.

== Tectonic setting ==
North Anatolia lies across the mainly transform boundary between the Anatolian Plate and the Eurasian plate. Relative to the Eurasian plate the Anatolian Plate is being forced westwards by the continuing northward movement of the Arabian plate. This motion is accommodated by a major dextral (right lateral) strike-slip fault system, the North Anatolian Fault. This 1,500 km (930 mi) long structure extends from the Karlıova triple junction in the east to the Aegean Sea in the west. In detail the fault is formed of many separate segments. Movement on parts of this fault zone have been responsible for many large and damaging earthquakes. They tend to form overall westward propagating sequences that can last for many decades. The most recent sequence began with the 1939 Erzincan earthquake, continuing with major earthquakes in 1942, 1943, 1944, 1949, 1951, 1957, 1966, 1967, 1992, and two in 1999.

== Earthquake ==
Analysis of historical records suggests that the 17 August earthquake was preceded by a number of foreshocks at the western end of the rupture zone. The mainshock was very large, with an estimated magnitude ranging from 7.8 M_{s} (based on the size of the area affected by shaking of intensity VI) to 8.0 M_{s} (based on the interpreted rupture length). The suggested rupture length varies from 380 km (240 mi) to 600 km (370 mi). In Tokat the earthquake was followed by at least six months of aftershocks.

Evidence of a major earthquake at about this time affecting the full 600 km (370 mi) has been found by trenching across the fault at many localities. The 600 km length is based on the assumption that there was a single large event rather than several smaller events, but that would require a propagating rupture to jump across a major extensional stepover (lateral offset) of 10 km (6.2 mi) in the fault at Niksar. Despite evidence from past events, backed up by dynamic rupture modelling, that most earthquakes are unable to jump more than about 5 km (3.1 mi), the 2001 Kunlun earthquake shows clear evidence of propagating across a much wider stepover and this has been backed by further numerical modelling that suggests that ruptures can jump 8 km or more in the case of mature fault systems.

The 1668 earthquake is regarded as probably the first in a mainly westward propagating sequence that continued into the 19th century, including the earthquakes in 1719, 1754, 1766, 1859 and 1894.

== Damage ==
The town of Bolu was reported to be almost completely destroyed by the earthquake, with 1,800 fatalities. There was also severe damage further east along the fault, with another 6,000 reported casualties between Merzifon and Niksar. Some damage was also reported from as far east as Erzincan and at various locations along the Black Sea coast. The walls and towers of Samsun Castle were damaged and some parts of the structure "were demolished".
