= Siege of Erivan (1635) =

- Part of the Ottoman–Safavid War (1623–1639)
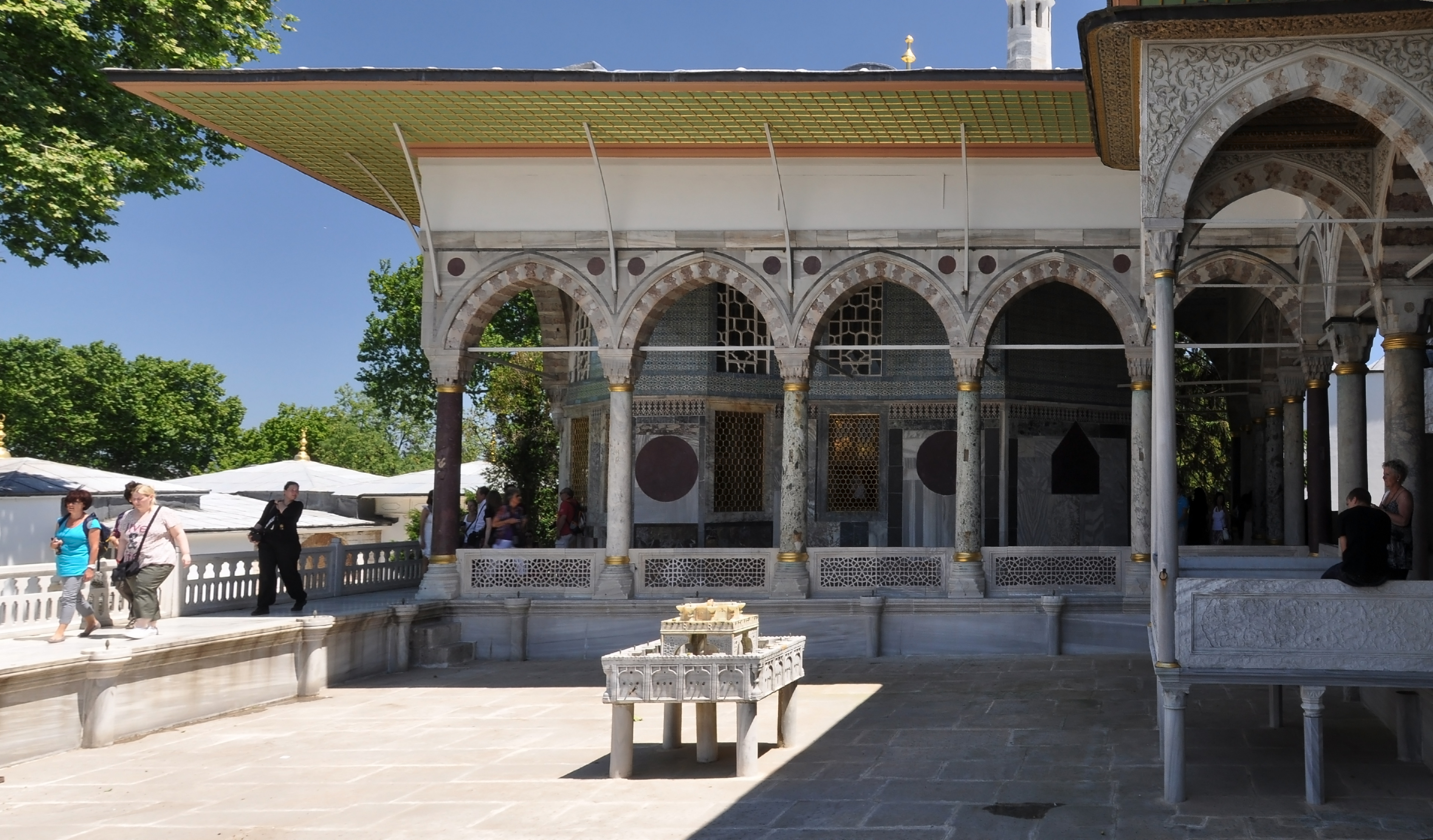
- Yerevan Kiosk in the Topkapı Palace, which was built by Sultan Murad to commemorate his victory at Yerevan.
Date	July 26 – August 8, 1635
Location	Erivan
Result	Ottoman victory

Belligerents
Safavid Empire	Ottoman Empire

Commanders and leaders
Emirgûneoğlu Tahmasp Kuli; Murad Agha	Murad IV; Tabanıyassı Mehmed Pasha

Casualties and losses
Heavy	Heavy

The siege of Erivan was a military engagement of the Ottoman–Safavid War (1623–1639). During this siege, the Ottoman Empire occupied the city of Erivan

== Siege ==
The conflict with the Ottoman Shah Abbas had started and continued after his death in 1629 under the leadership of his grandson Shah Safi. Eager to prevent further losses against the Safavids, the Ottoman sultan, Murad IV, began preparing for a long campaign to invade the Safavid territory in 1635. Throughout the campaign, he executed those who neglected their duties, as well as highway robbers and bandits. The Ottoman army arrived at the city of Erivan on July 26.

The Sultan established his camp on Hünkâr Hill, where he was able to see the city clearly. On July 29, the Ottomans placed their cannons on the hill overlooking the castle and began bombarding the walls. The bombing caused casualties and damaged not only the walls but also the houses within. The next day, the Janisseries attacked the barricades of the Safavids, but despite intense bombardment, which inflicted heavy losses on the attackers, the Ottomans successfully captured their barricades. In order to keep the Ottoman troops morale high, the Sultan personally took care of the wounded and checked their conditions.

The Ottomans kept bombarding the city constantly, and on August 2, the Safavids launched a sortie against the Rumelian soldiers. Even though it was an organized attack, they were repelled and compelled to retreat behind the walls. The garrison did not dare to go out in offense after this. The Safavid commander, Emirgûneoğlu Tahmasp Kuli, dispatched his lieutenant, Murad Agha, to negotiate with the grand vizier, Tabanıyassı Mehmed Pasha, who showed him to the Sultan and offered him the castle in exchange for their lives, to which he agreed. On August 8, the Safavids ceded the city.

== Aftermath ==
Emirgûneoğlu Tahmasp Kuli joined the Ottomans and became a Sunni Muslim alongside Murad Agha. He would change his name to Yusuf Pasha and be appointed governor of Aleppo. The Sultan left Erivan and headed towards Tabriz 13 days later. He captured the city and laid waste to it. After the arrival of winter and the Safavids avoiding battles, the Ottomans returned to Istanbul. Murad had the Erivan Kiosk in the Topkapı Palace built to commemorate his victory at Erivan.

== Sources ==
- Erhan Afyoncu (2022), A Short History of the Ottoman Empire (Yeditepe Yayınev).
- Meir Litvak & Ofra Bengio (2014), The Sunna and Shi'a in History, Division, and Ecumenism in the Muslim Middle East.
- Özer Küpeli (2009), Ottoman-Safavid Relations (1612–1639) (In Turkish).
