= Samsun Castle =

Castle in Samsun, Turkey built in 1092

- Samsun Kalesi
- Samsun in Turkey
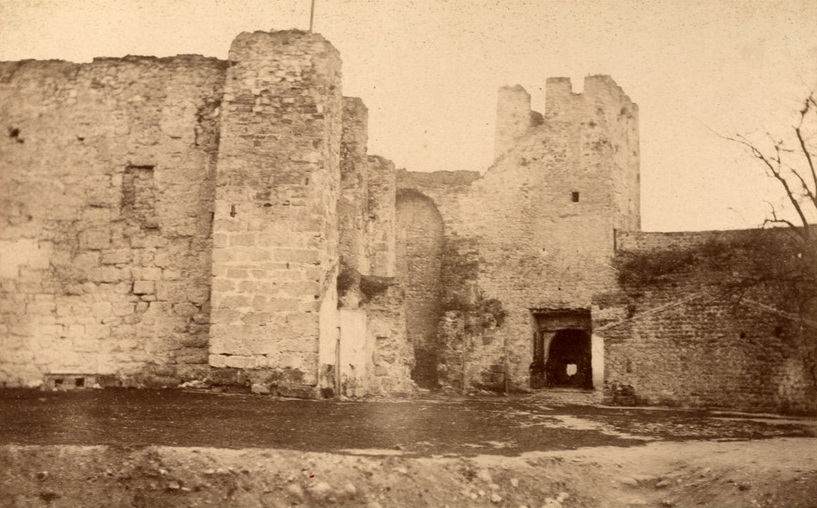
- A view of Samsun Castle.

Site information
- Type: Castle

Location
- Location of Samsun Castle in Turkey.
- Coordinates: 41°17′N 36°20′E
- Height: 8 m (26 ft)

Site history
- Built: 1092
- Built by: Danishmends
- Fate: Demolished between 1909 and 1918

Samsun Castle was a castle in Samsun, Turkey. Built on the seaside in 1092, it was demolished between 1909 and 1918.

== History ==
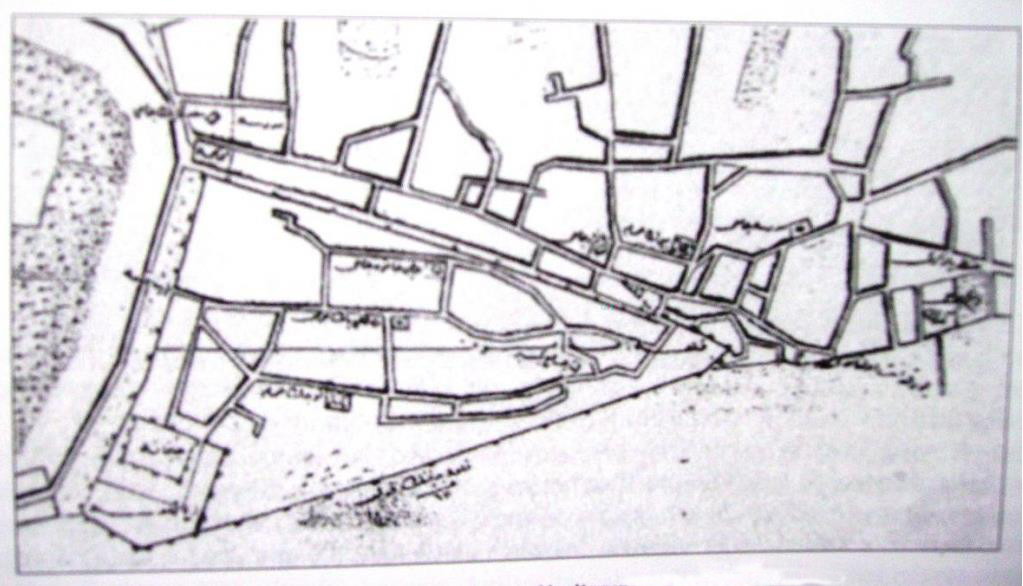
Boundaries of Samsun Castle in a map of 1856

The castle was built near the Black Sea coast by Danishmends in 1092 after they were unable to capture Amisos Castle. The castle with 8 m (26 ft)-high walls hosted hundreds of houses and shops, two masdjids (small mosque) and a mosque commissioned by Hızır Bey, a commander of the Seljuk Empire.

Ottoman traveler Evliya Çelebi wrote after his visit to Samsun in 1640 in his comprehensive work Seyahatname ("Travelogue") that the castle was strong but damaged. It consisted of walls five thousand steps in length, seventy watchtowers and two thousand battlements. The castle hosted a mosque, a hammam (bathhouse) and a small shopping center.

The walls and towers of the castle were damaged and some parts of the structure were demolished in the 1668 North Anatolia earthquake which had a magnitude of 8.0.

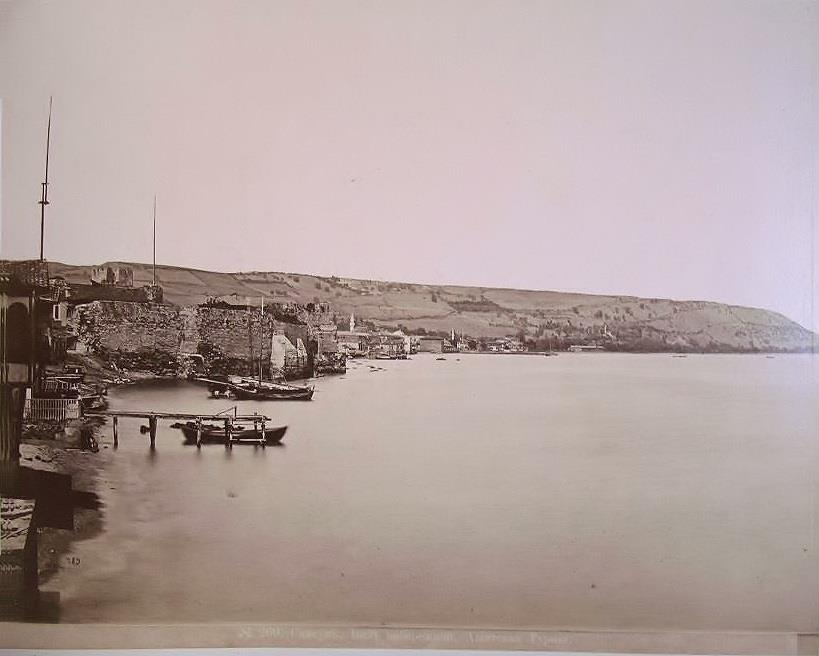
Seaside walls of Samsun Castle (1870)

The castle walls on the seaside were reinforced by abutments at every twelve step distance to enable the walls to resist the rogue waves of the Black Sea. The castle, which underwent repair from time to time, remained almost intact until the great fire of 1869. After the fire, the landside walls of the castle were demolished in order to make room for construction to rebuild the city. The castle, except the seaside walls and arsenal, disappeared.

During the Second Constitutional Era, the Ottoman Ministry of War made a decision to clear off all historical ruins that were approved by Sultan Mehmed V (reigned 1909–1918). The castle's estate was handed over to the Ministry of War. Later, the land was turned over to the Ottoman Ministry of Finance, which sold it at auction after parceling.

An inscription, which was once attached above one of the castle gates, is archived at Istanbul University's library today.

== Restoration project ==
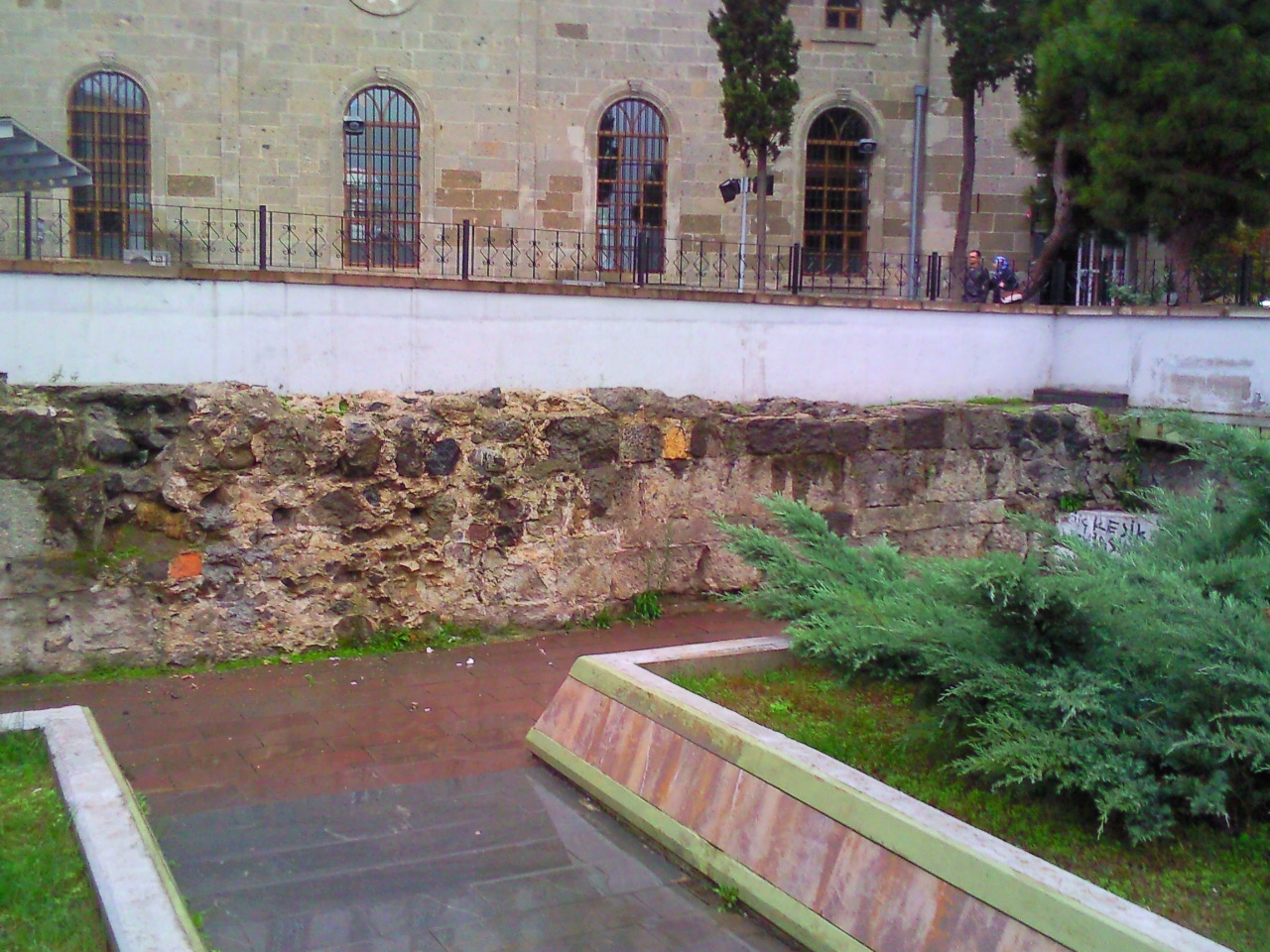
Remains of castle walls recovered in 2008

In 2008, during the restoration works at the Grand Mosque (Turkish: Büyük Cami), remains of the castle walls were found. Today, only the remains of a 13 m (43 ft)-long castle wall ruin is available. The Board of Reservation of Cultural Heritage in Samsun registered the entire castle walls and put it under protection.

The metropolitan municipality of Samsun reported in January 2015 that plans were made to restore the castle.
