= Tayyar Mehmed Pasha =

Grand Vizier of the Ottoman Empire (1638)

Grand Vizier of the Ottoman Empire
- In office 27 August 1638 – 24 December 1638
- Monarch: Murad IV
- Preceded by: Bayram Pasha
- Succeeded by: Kemankeş Kara Mustafa Pasha

Personal details
- Born: Ladik, Ottoman Empire
- Died: 24 December 1638 Baghdad, Ottoman Iraq

Military service
- Battles/wars: Capture of Baghdad (1638) †

Tayyar Mehmed Pasha (died 24 December 1638) was an Ottoman grand vizier. His epithet Tayyar means "flying", referring to his speed in military operations.

== Early years ==
Mehmed was born to Uçar Mustafa Pasha in Ladik, near the Black Sea. He worked as Nasuh Pasha's kethüda (chamberlain). After the death of Osman II, he joined the rebellious forces of Abaza Mehmet, but during the battle of Kayseri in 1624, he changed sides and was appointed as the beylerbey (governor-general) of Diyarbakır (in modern southeast Turkey).

== As grand vizier ==
During the campaign of sultan Murad IV for Baghdad (see Ottoman–Safavid War (1623–1639)), he was tasked with guarding Mosul. But when Bayram Pasha, then grand vizier, died on the way to Baghdad, the sultan appointed Tayyar Mehmed Pasha as the new grand vizier.

The siege of Baghdad took more than 40 days. The impatient sultan reprimanded the Pasha, who was directing the siege cautiously to minimize losses. After this incident, Tayyar Mehmed Pasha decided for a general attack and personally took part in the fighting on 24 December 1638 in the capture of Baghdad. Although the attack was successful, Tayyar Mehmed Pasha was killed during the fighting. The sultan expressed his sorrow, saying "O Tayyar, You are worth one hundred castles [cities] like Baghdad." Following Hadım Ali Pasha in 1511 and Hadım Sinan Pasha in 1517, Tayyar Mehmed Pasha was the third Ottoman grand vizier to be killed in battle. His father had also been killed during a siege of Baghdad in 1625.

Political offices
Preceded by Bayram Pasha	Grand Vizier of the Ottoman Empire; 27 August 1638 – 24 December 1638	Succeeded by Kemankeş Mustafa Pasha
