= Melek Ahmed Pasha =

Grand Vizier of the Ottoman Empire from 1650 to 1651

Damat Melek Ahmed Pasha

Grand Vizier of the Ottoman Empire
- In office 5 August 1650 – 22 August 1651
- Monarch: Mehmed IV
- Preceded by: Kara Murat Pasha
- Succeeded by: Abaza Siyavuş Pasha I

Personal details
- Born: c. 1604 Galata, Istanbul, Ottoman Empire
- Died: c. 1662 (aged 57–58) Istanbul, Ottoman Empire
- Spouses: Kaya Sultan (m. 1644; died 1658) Fatma Sultan (m. 1662)
- Children: First marriage Fatma Afife Hanımsultan; Sultanzade Abdüllah Bey; Fülane Hanımsultan

Melek Ahmed Pasha ("Ahmed Pasha the Angel"; c. 1604–1662) was an Ottoman statesman and grand vizier during the reign of Mehmed IV.

== Early years ==
He was of Abkhaz (or Abazin) origin. According to one source, his father was a sea captain named Pervane. During the reign of Murad IV, he was appointed as the governor of Diyarbakır. During Ibrahim's reign, he was appointed to the governorships of Erzurum, Mosul, Aleppo and Damascus. In 1644, he married İsmihan Kaya Sultan, Murad's daughter, and gained the title damat (groom). But all of the provinces (even Erzurum, a part of Turkey) he was assigned, were quite far from Istanbul, the capital, and during most of his assignments, his wife stayed in Istanbul. During the reign of Mehmed IV, he finally returned to Istanbul as a vizier. But in 1652, to the dismay of his wife, he was appointed as the governor of Baghdad, another post far from Istanbul. Kaya Sultan tried to persuade the regent, Turhan Sultan (Mehmed IV's mother) to revoke the decision, but she couldn't succeed. Nevertheless, before Melek Ahmed left Istanbul, the Grand Vizier Kara Murat Pasha resigned, complaining of the intrigues of the palace people. The queen regent offered the post to Melek Ahmed, who accepted the offer on the condition that the palace people would not meddle with the governance of the state. Kaya Sultan died on 28 February 1658.

His sister was married to Haydarzade Mehmed Pasha, the Ottoman governor of Egypt from 1646 to 1647.

== Grand Vizierate ==
When Melek Ahmed took office, he realized that the empire was almost bankrupt. The Cretan War (1645–1669) was very costly, and tax revenues from Anatolia were much less than the expected amount because of the Jelali revolts. He attempted to balance the budget, but without a real knowledge of financial affairs, his economic measures worsened the economy instead of improving it. Among his measures was the debasing of coinage by reducing the gold content. This caused reactions among both the merchants and the soldiers, whose salaries were paid by the new coins. The sultan was forced to relieve him of his post on 22 August 1651.

== Later years ==
After 1651, he was again assigned as a provincial governor, but this time in Silistra (now in Bulgaria), much closer to capital. Soon, he was able to return to Istanbul. In 1654, Mustafa İbşir Pasha had been appointed as the Grand Vizier, but delayed his arrival in Istanbul. During this period, Melek Ahmed functioned as his deputy. This aroused İbşir Pasha's suspicions, and Melek Ahmed was exiled to Van and Malkara. However, after İbşir Pasha was deposed, Melek Ahmed Pasha was able to regain his former titles. After working in some provinces in the European part of the empire, he was married for a second time to Fatma Sultan (the daughter of the late sultan Ahmed I) in 1662. On their wedding night, Fatma demanded that her new husband guarantee her an income five times higher than that of the deceased Kaya Sultan. When he told her that he did not have such wealth, she threatened to divorce him and immediately withdraw her dowry, which amounted to one year's taxes of the provinces of Egypt. Faced with this blackmail, Melek had to give her what she wanted.

Melek Ahmed Pasha died in 1662, only months after marrying Fatma Sultan.

== Aftermath ==
In the Ottoman Empire, the minting of devalued coinage continued after 1651 and provided the major reason for a wide-scale rebellion, the Çınar Incident, in 1656.

== Issue ==
By Kaya Sultan, he had a son and two daughters:

- Fatma Afife Hanımsultan (1652–1727). She married Süleyman Pasha. She was the stepmother of his children by his first marriage, Mahmud Bey and Ahmed Bey, but she appears to have had no children of her own. She was very devoted and took care of her mother's charitable foundations after her death. She was buried in the Şehzade Mosque.
- Sultanzade Abdüllah Bey (1655–1655). Born prematurely at seven months, he lived less than a day.
- Fülane Hanımsultan (24 February 1658 - 1658?). Kaya died four days after her birth. As there is no information about her, she is supposed to have died at birth or shortly thereafter.

Another son, Ibrahim Bey, born to an unknown mother before his marriage to Kaya or during Melek Ahmed's widowhood, is mentioned in his will.

== Evliya Çelebi and Melek Ahmed Pasha ==
Evliya Çelebi and Melek Ahmet Pasha were milk brothers as a result they happened to be very close to each other. Although not a particularly successful Grand Vizier, details about both Melek Ahmed Pasa and his wife Kaya Sultan (as well as his later marriage to Fatma Sultan) are well known because of Evliya Çelebi's books. Evliya Çelebi was one of the most important Turkish travel writers of his time, and his mother was the milk-sister of Melek Ahmed Pasha, and Evliya Çelebi used this opportunity to travel with Melek Ahmed Pasha.

== See also ==
- List of Ottoman grand viziers

Political offices
Preceded by Kara Murat Pasha	Grand Vizier of the Ottoman Empire; 5 August 1650 – 22 August 1651	Succeeded by Abaza Siyavuş Pasha I
