= Ermeni Süleyman Pasha =

Grand Vizier of the Ottoman Empire from 1655 to 1656

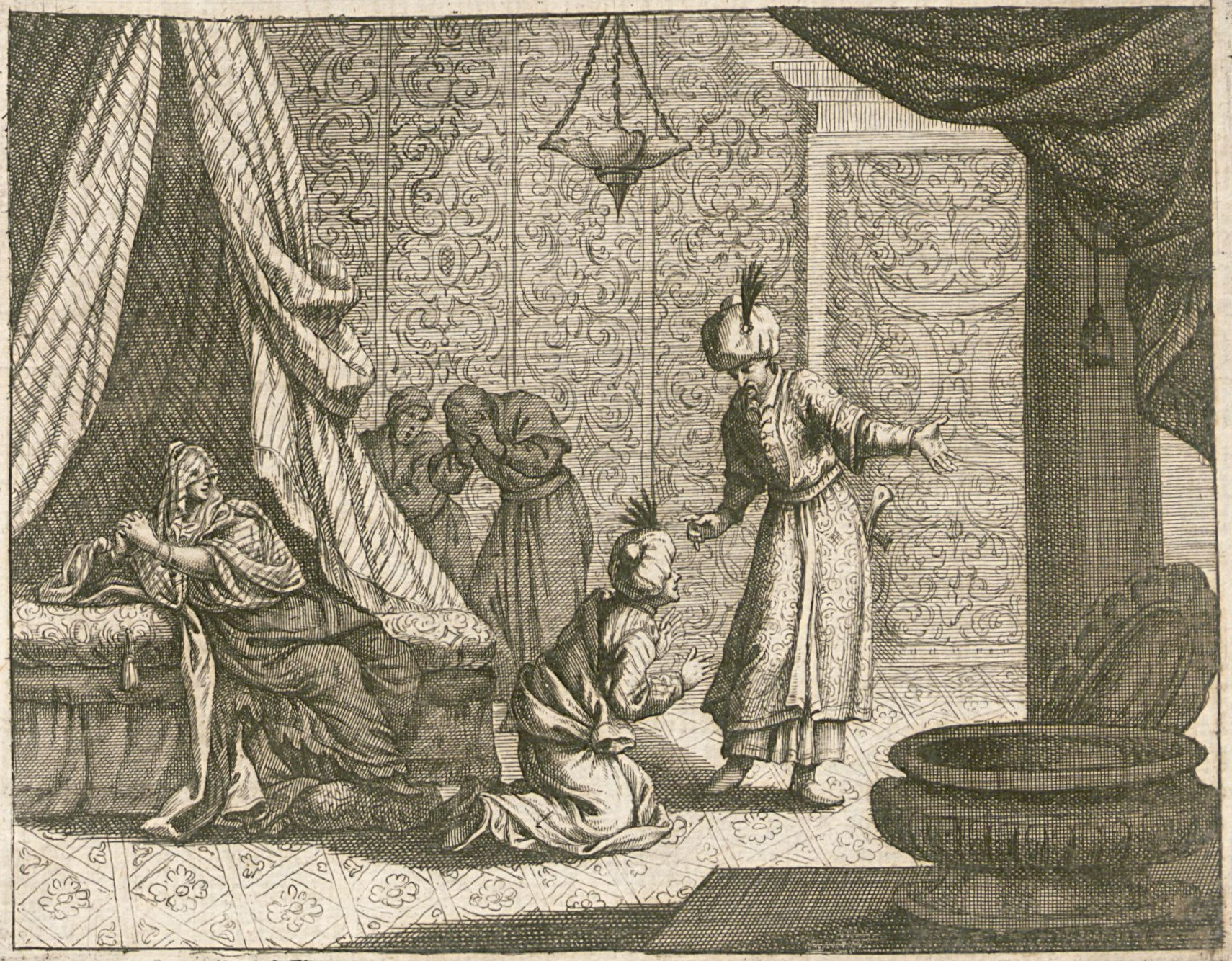
- Ermeni Süleyman Pasha (standing) depicted on the 1701 German illustration

Grand Vizier of the Ottoman Empire
- In office 19 August 1655 – 28 February 1656
- Monarch: Mehmed IV
- Preceded by: Kara Dev Murad Pasha
- Succeeded by: Gazi Hüseyin Pasha

Personal details
- Born: 1607 Malatya, Ottoman Empire
- Died: 28 February 1656 (aged 48–49) Istanbul, Ottoman Empire
- Spouse: Ayşe Sultan (m. 1656; died 1656)
- Nickname: Koca

Ermeni Süleyman Pasha (Armenian: Էրմենի Սուլեյման Փաշա) also Koca was an Ottoman statesman of Armenian ethnicity. He was Grand Vizier of the Ottoman Empire from 19 August 1655 until his death on 28 February 1656.

He attended Enderun school. He served as governor of Sivas and then of Erzurum. He was married to Ayşe Sultan, a daughter of Sultan Ahmed I. She died the following year. After being demoted from the position of Grand Vizier, he was appointed as the governor of Bosnia then as kaymakam of Istanbul, Özü, then Istanbul, and Erzurum again. After this last position, he retired and died in Istanbul.
