= Capture of Tabriz (1635) =

Ottoman capture and sack of Tabriz

- Part of the Ottoman–Safavid War (1623–1639)
Date	1635
Location	Tabriz
Result	Ottoman victory
Territorial changes	Tabriz captured and plundered

Belligerents
Ottoman Empire	Safavid Iran

Commanders and leaders
Murad IV	Rostam Khan

Casualties and losses
- Destruction of Tabriz

The Capture of Tabriz was a military action of the Ottoman–Safavid War (1623–1639). During this action the Ottoman Empire occupied and sacked the Safavid city of Tabriz. The city is located in the northwest of modern-day Iran.

== Background ==
After Shah Abbas I died in January 1629, Safavid Iran had managed to restore its borders, reclaiming territories such as Azerbaijan, Arabic Iraq, Ahalsikh in Southern Georgia, and parts of Eastern Georgia. His successor and grandson, Shah Safi I (1629-1642), relocated the royal residence back to Kazvin.

== Prelude ==
In the spring of 1634, news reached the Shah's court about Ottoman Sultan Murad IV's intentions to reconquer lost territories in Azerbaijan. As a response, the Safavids decided to concentrate their forces in Tabriz. The Ottoman invasion, led by Murad IV, commenced from Erzurum on August 8. They quickly besieged the city of Iravan, but the siege was short-lived. Tahmasib-Kulu Khan, the commander of the fortress garrison, betrayed Isfahan palace and fled, leading to the Ottoman army redirecting their efforts southeastward towards Tabriz.

== Occupation and sacking of the city ==
Upon receiving orders from Shah Safi I, the Iranian military commander, Rostam Khan, evacuated the population of Tabriz and ordered the city's devastation. Following these orders, the Safavid army retreated. The Ottomans occupied Tabriz without encountering resistance, and Murad IV ordered the destruction of the city. Turkish historians described how Ottoman soldiers demolished tall buildings and grand palaces, dismantling and carrying away window frames made by skilled craftsmen, many of which were adorned with sky-blue or azure colors.
