= Ayşe Sultan (daughter of Ahmed I) =

Ottoman princess (died 1656)

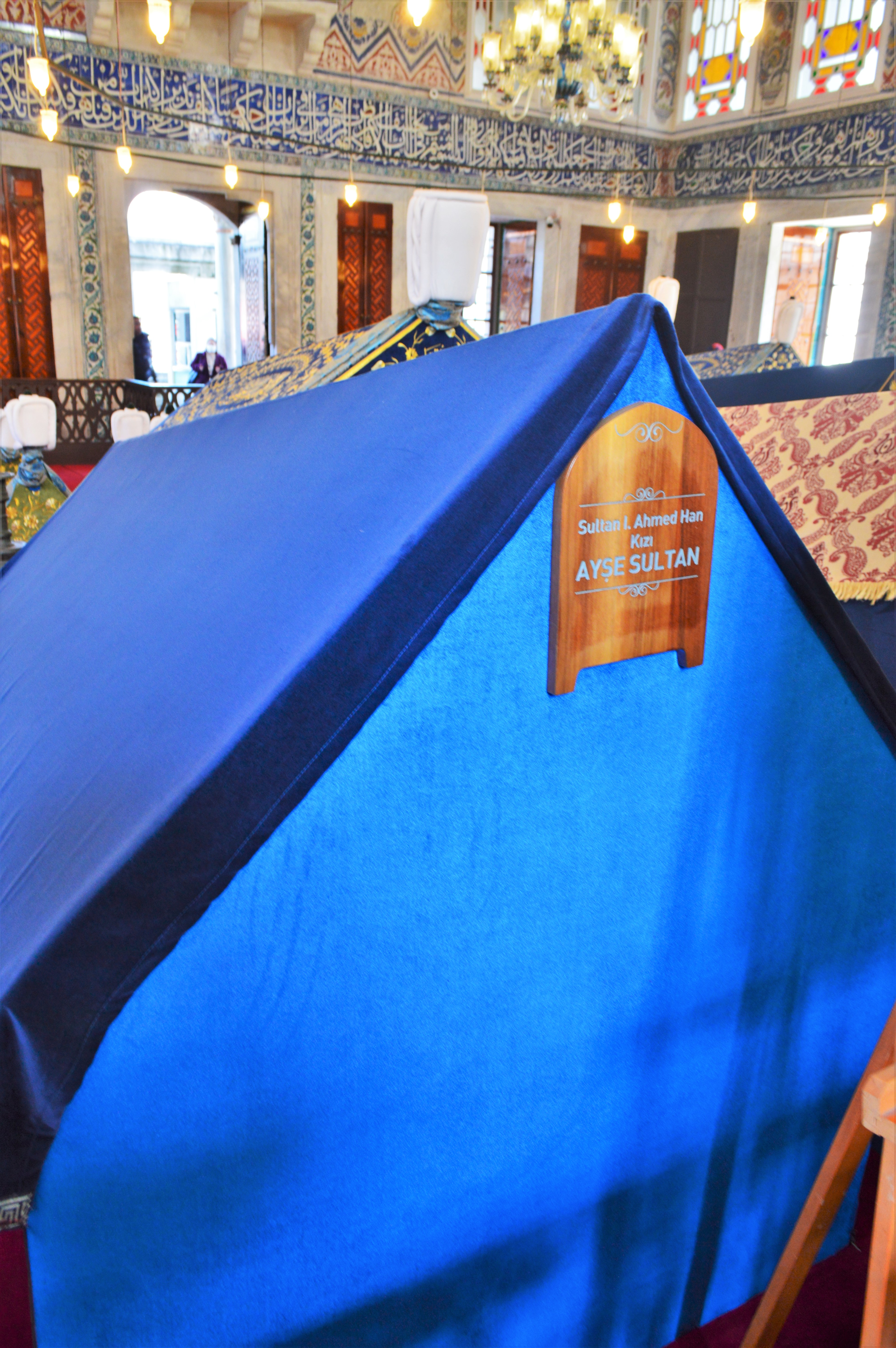
- Tomb of Ayşe Sultan
- Born: c. 1606/1608; Topkapı Palace, Constantinople, Ottoman Empire (now Istanbul, Turkey)
- Died: 1657 (aged 49–51); Constantinople, Ottoman Empire
- Burial: Sultan Ahmed Mosque, Istanbul
- Spouses: Gümülcineli Nasuh Pasha (m. 1612; died 1614) Karakaş Mehmed Pasha (m. 1620; died 1621) Hafız Ahmed Pasha (m. 1626; died 1632) Damat Murtaza Pasha (m. 1635; died 1636) Ahmed Pasha (m. 1639; died 1644) Voynuk Ahmed Pasha (m. 1645; died 1649) Ibşir Mustafa Pasha (m. 1655; died 1655) Ermeni Süleyman Pasha (m. 1656)
- Issue: Third marriage Sultanzade Fülan Bey; Sultanzade Mustafa Bey
Names
- Turkish: Ayşe Sultan binti Ahmed Han
- Dynasty: Ottoman
- Father: Ahmed I
- Mother: Kösem Sultan
- Religion: Sunni Islam

Ayşe Sultan (Ottoman Turkish: عائشه سلطان; c. 1606/1608 – 1657) was an Ottoman princess, daughter of Sultan Ahmed I (reign 1603–17) and Kösem Sultan, half-sister of Sultan Osman II (reign 1618–22) and sister of Sultan Murad IV (reign 1623–40) and Sultan Ibrahim (reign 1640–48) of the Ottoman Empire. She is known for her many politically motivated marriages.

== Life ==
=== Early life ===
Born in Istanbul, Ayşe Sultan was one of Ahmed's daughters by his favorite consort Kösem Sultan. Her birth date is variously estimated as 1606 or 1608. When mentioning her and Nasuh Pasha's 1612 wedding, 17th-century historian Mustafa Naima refers to Ayşe as "the youngest of the princesses married in these day".

=== Marriages ===
Ottoman princesses were normally married away to influential Ottoman officials by their mothers or paternal grandmothers, who had the right to arrange their marriages and arranged matches which could be of political use. They had privileges in marriage which separated them from other Muslim females, such as the right to be the only wife of their spouse; to refuse to consummate their marriage until they were ready; and to contract a divorce when they pleased. Due to many of them marrying as children and being widowed and divorced several times, often for political reasons, remarriages were very common. Ayşe and her sister, Fatma Sultan, are extreme examples of this: they were married at least seven times, and entered into their last engagement at the ages of about 50 and 61, respectively.

Two of Ayşe's husbands were executed, one was assassinated, and two fell in battle.

==== First marriage ====
Ayşe Sultan was married firstly in 1612 to Gümülcineli Nasuh Pasha, Grand Vizier 1611–14. The celebrations of their engagement and wedding ceremonies - as well as those of Gevherhan Sultan (her sister) and Öküz Kara Mehmed Pasha, which took place in succession over a number of months of 1611 and 1612 - were sponsored by Ahmed, and were so elaborate and extravagant that they were observed by the public as if they were festivals marking the end of wars the Sultan had promised. In July of the latter year, the little princess was taken in great pomp to her husband's palace, where he would eventually be executed in 1614 in her presence, much to her distress. This palace, located opposite the quay known as Salacak in Üsküdar, she retained as her own property. In 1618, she had a water dispenser (sebil) built in Okçubaşı avenue in Istanbul.

==== Second marriage ====
While still a child, Ayşe was married secondly to Karakaş Mehmed Pasha (d. 1621), Beylerbey (governor-general) of Buda. However, he died the following year, while fighting in Osman II's military campaign against Poland, the marriage thus lasting less than a year.

==== Third marriage ====
In 1622, her mother, Kösem Sultan, offered her hand in marriage to Hafız Ahmed Pasha (1564–10 February 1632), Grand Vizier (1625–26, 1631–32). In a letter to Hafız Pasha, Kösem had proposed the marriage alliance, expressing readiness to act promptly and extending the same care she provided in the past when arranging the marriage of her daughter Fatma Sultan. Ayşe wed the sixty-year-old man either in the same year or on 13 March 1626. Hafız Pasha died in 1632 during a Janissary revolt against her brother Murad IV.

==== Fourth marriage ====
Only a month after the murder of Hafiz Pasha during a Janissary revolt against her brother Murad IV, Ayşe was betrothed to Murtaza Pasha (d. 1636), beylerbey of Diyarbekir and Vizier, the nuptials though not being held until his arrival at the imperial capitol of Constantinople in 1635.

This old and ailing husband who she strongly disliked, according to Venetian reports, died – thus saving her from a unhappy life – during Murad's military campaign against Revan, which took place in the course of the Ottoman–Safavid War (1623–1639).

==== Fifth and sixth marriage ====
She was next married in 1639 to Ahmed Pasha, beylerbey of Aleppo and Damascus, who died in 1644. Her daily stipend during this time was 430 aspers. In March 1645, she married Voynuk Ahmed Pasha, beylerbey of Adana, Vizier, Admiral of the Fleet12/22 June 1648 – 28 July 1649. She was widowed on 28 July 1649.

In 1643, early in the reign of her brother Ibrahim "the Mad", Ayşe is recorded, like her sisters Fatma Sultan and Hanzade Sultan, as receiving the maximum daily stipend for imperial princesses of the time, namely 400 aspers; yet, later, in circa 1647, the three of them as well as their niece, Murad's daughter Kaya Sultan, were subjected, on what was another assault of the protocol on Ibrahim's part, to the indignity of subordination to his concubines. He took away their lands and jewels (presumably to award them to his Hasekis), and made them serve Hümaşah Sultan, the concubine he married, by standing at attention like servants while she ate and fetching and holding the soap, basin and pitcher of water with which she washed her hands. Because of what he believed was their failure to serve his beloved Hümaşah properly, the Sultan then banished them to Edirne Palace.

==== Seventh marriage ====
Some five or six years after Voynuk Ahmed Pasha died in battle by rifle fire during the Cretan War (1645–1669) in 1654 or 1655, Ayşe was betrothed to rebel Ibşir Mustafa Pasha (d. 11 May 1655). Thanks to her appeal, Mustafa Pasha was given the post of Grand Vizier.

She apparently anxiously awaited her intended husband's arrival – which he delayed for months – for she dispatched several emissaries to bring him to the capital. Her head servant, Mercan Ağa, finally succeeded in the task, and when Ibşir and his troops reached her palace in Üsküdar, she treated him and the statesmen that had come to receive him to a great banquet, "like a feast of Hatem Tay", according to Evliya Çelebi. Their wedding took place on 28 February 1655. Their life together was short, ending upon his execution in May of the same year.

==== Eighth marriage ====
In 1656 she married for the eighth and last time, with Ermeni Süleyman Pasha. She died the following year.

== Death ==
Ayşe Sultan probably died in 1657. She was entombed in her father Sultan Ahmed I's mausoleum in Sultan Ahmed Mosque.

== Charities ==
In 1618, Ayşe Sultan had a water dispenser built between what is today Okçubaşı avenue and the tramway railway in Istanbul.

== Issue ==
By her third husband, Ayşe had two sons:

- Sultanzade Fülan Bey (1626 - 1628).
- Sultanzade Mustafa Bey (1628 – 1670).

It is not known if she had other children.

== Depictions in literature & popular culture ==
- Ayşe Sultan is a character in Güngör Dilmen's (1930-2012) one-woman play I, Anatolia (Ben, Anadolu), featuring Anatolian women "from time immemorial to the early twentieth century".
- In 2015 Turkish historical fiction TV series Muhteşem Yüzyıl: Kösem, an adolescent Ayşe Sultan is portrayed by Turkish actress Sude Zulal Güler.

== See also ==
- List of Ottoman princesses

== Sources ==
- Börekçi, Günhan (2010). Factions And Favorites At The Courts Of Sultan Ahmed I (r. 1603-17) And His Immediate Predecessors. Ohio State University. p. 303.
- Çelebi, Evliya (1991) [1659]. "Kaya Sultan (1659)". In Robert Dankoff (ed.). In The Intimate Life of an Ottoman Statesman: Melek Ahmed Pasha (1588–1662) As Portrayed in Evliya Çelebi's Book of Travels (Seyahat-Name). Albany: State University of New York Press. pp. 221–236. ISBN 9781438400495.
- Freely, John (1999). Inside the Seraglio: Private Lives of the Sultans in Istanbul. Viking. p. 360. ISBN 978-0140270563.
- Gülsoy, Ersin (2004). Girit'in fethi ve Osmanlı idaresinin kurulması 1645–1670. Tarih ve Tabiat Vakfı. p. 383.
- Halman, Talât Sait; Warner, Jayne L. (2008). I, Anatolia and Other Plays. Syracuse University Press. p. 256. ISBN 9786059306409.
- Naima, Mustafa (1832). Annals of the Turkish Empire from 1591 to 1659 of the Christian Era: Volume 1. Oriental Translation Fund. p. 471.
- Peirce, Leslie P. (1993). The Imperial Harem: Women and Sovereignty in the Ottoman Empire. Oxford University Press. ISBN 978-0-195-08677-5.
- Sakaoğlu, Necdet (2008). Bu mülkün kadın sultanları: Vâlide sultanlar, hâtunlar, hasekiler, kadınefendiler, sultanefendiler. Oğlak Yayıncılık. p. 303.
- Singh, Nagendra Kr (2000). International encyclopaedia of Islamic dynasties (reproduction of the article by M. Cavid Baysun "Kösem Walide or Kösem Sultan" in The Encyclopaedia of Islam vol V). Anmol Publications PVT. pp. 423–424. ISBN 81-261-0403-1.
- Uluçay, M.Cağatay (1956). Harem'den mektuplar I. Vakit matbaasi. p. 206.
- Uluçay, Mustafa Çağatay (1985). Padışahların kadınları ve kızları. Türk Tarihi Kurumu Yayınları. p. 220.
