= Ladik Lake =

Lake in Ladik, Samsun, Turkey

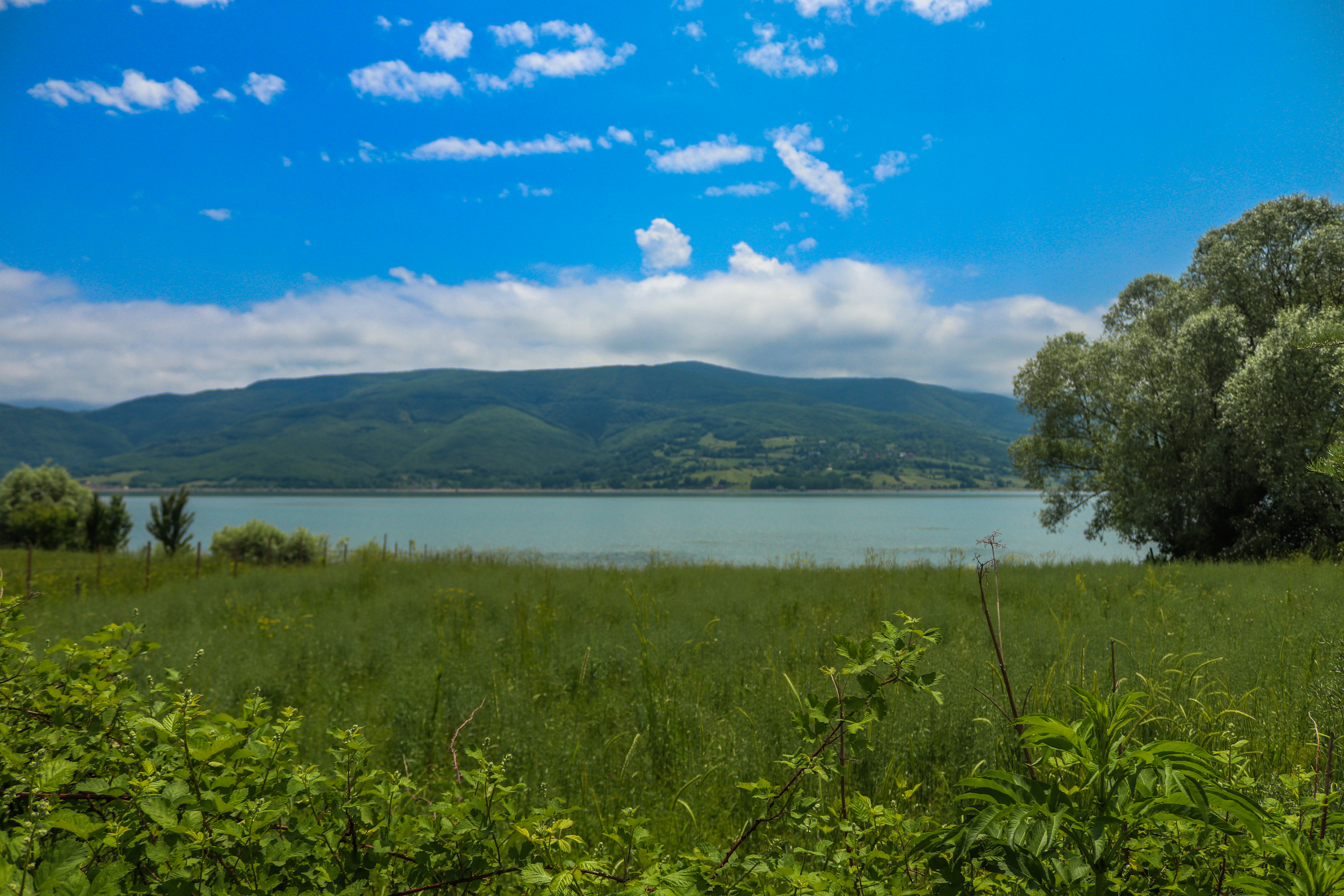
- Ladik Lake

- Location within Turkey
- Location: Ladik District, Samsun Province, Turkey
- Coordinates: 40°54′N 36°00′E
- Type: Tectonic lake
- Primary inflows: Tersakan Çayı
- Primary outflows: none
- Basin countries: Turkey
- Max. length: 7 km (4.3 mi)
- Max. width: 2 km (1.2 mi)
- Surface area: 8.7 km^{2} (3 sq mi)
- Average depth: 6 m (20 ft)
- Max. depth: 13 m (43 ft)
- Shore length^{1}: 15 km (9.3 mi)
- Surface elevation: 950 m (3,120 ft)
- ^{1} Shore length is not a well-defined measure.

Ladik Lake (Turkish: Ladik Gölü; Ancient Greek: Στιφάνη Λίμνη, romanized: Stiphane Limne) is a lake in Samsun Province, Asiatic Turkey. In Classical antiquity, it was called Stiphane, and is located in the northwestern part of ancient Pontus, in the area called Phazemonitis. According to Strabo, the lake abounded in fish, and its shores afforded excellent pasture. The southern shore of Ladik Lake was the epicenter of the 7.8–8.0 M_{s} 1668 North Anatolia earthquake, which is thought to be the most powerful earthquake in Turkey.
