= Tabanıyassı Mehmed Pasha =

Grand Vizier of the Ottoman Empire from 1632 to 1637

Grand Vizier of the Ottoman Empire
- In office 18 May 1632 – 2 February 1637
- Monarch: Murad IV
- Preceded by: Topal Recep Pasha
- Succeeded by: Bayram Pasha

Ottoman Governor of Egypt
- In office 1628–1630
- Preceded by: Bayram Pasha
- Succeeded by: Koca Musa Pasha

Personal details
- Born: 1589 Drama, Ottoman Empire
- Died: 2 February 1637 (aged 47–48) Yedikule, Istanbul, Ottoman Empire

Tabanıyassı ("flat-footed") Mehmed Pasha (1589 – 2 February 1637) was an Ottoman statesman of Albanian descent. He was governor of Egypt from September 1628 to October 1630. He served as Grand Vizier from 18 May 1632 to 1637 under Sultan Murat IV.

During the early years of his term, he had the support of the sultan because of his services during the campaign in northwestern Iran (known as the Campaign of Revan). However, after sultan's return to Constantinople, Mehmed Pasha failed to defend the fort of Revan (modern Yerevan) against the Persian counterattack, and the sultan dismissed him from his post. In his later years, he was appointed as the governor of Silistra. In 1637, Murat IV became suspicious of Mehmed Pasha and accused him of attempting to start a rebellion in parts of the Empire. The sultan first imprisoned him at the Yedikule Fortress and then executed him by drowning on 2 February 1637.

== Notes ==
Political offices
Preceded by Bayram Pasha	Ottoman Governor of Egypt; 1628–1630	Succeeded by Koca Musa Pasha
Preceded by Topal Recep Pasha	Grand Vizier of the Ottoman Empire; 18 May 1632 – 2 February 1637	Succeeded by Bayram Pasha
