= Fatma Sultan (daughter of Ahmed I) =

Ottoman princess (died 1670)

- Born: 1606 or 1608; Topkapı Palace, Constantinople, Ottoman Empire (present day Istanbul, Turkey)
- Died: 1670 (aged 62–64); Istanbul, Ottoman Empire
- Burial: Sultan Ahmed Mosque, Istanbul
- Spouses: Kara Mustafa Pasha (m. 1623; executed 1628) Çatalcalı Hasan Pasha (m. 1629; died 1631) Canbuladzade Mustafa Pasha (m. 1632; executed 1636) Koca Yusuf Pasha (m. 1637; died 1658) Melek Ahmed Pasha (m. 1662; died 1662) Kanbur Mustafa Pasha (m. 1663; died 1666) Közbekçi Yusuf Pasha (m. 1667)
- Issue: second marriage Sultanzade Hasan Bey third marriage Sultanzade Hüseyin Pasha; Sultanzade Süleyman Bey
Names
- Turkish: Fatma bint Ahmed Han
- Dynasty: Ottoman
- Father: Ahmed I
- Mother: Kösem Sultan
- Religion: Sunni Islam

Fatma Sultan (Ottoman Turkish: فاطمه سلطان; 1606 or 1608 – 1670) was an Ottoman princess, daughter of Sultan Ahmed I (r. 1603–1617) and Kösem Sultan. She was a half-sister of Osman II and sister of Murad IV (r. 1623–1640) and Ibrahim (r. 1640–1648), and the paternal aunt of Mehmed IV (r. 1648–1687), Suleiman II (r. 1687–1691) and Ahmed II (r. 1691–1695). She is known for her many political marriages.

== Life ==
=== Early life ===
The year of her birth has been suggested as either 1606 or 1608. She lived in Topkapi Palace until her father's death in 1617, when she had to follow her mother and sisters to Eski Saray. She returned to court in 1623, when her younger brother Murad IV became the new sultan.

=== Marriages ===
The Ottoman princesses were normally married away, to influential Ottoman officials, by their mothers or paternal grandmothers, who had the right to arrange their marriages and arranged matches which could be of political use. They had privileges in marriage which distinguished them from other Muslim females: such as the right to be the only wife of their spouse, to refuse to consummate their marriage until they were ready and to contract a divorce when they pleased. Due to many of them marrying as children and being widowed and divorced several times, often for political reasons, remarriages were very common. Fatma Sultan and her sister, Ayşe Sultan, are extreme examples of this: they were married at least seven times each, and entered into their last engagement at the ages of 61 and 50, respectively.

==== First marriage ====
During the reign of her brother Sultan Murad IV, Fatma Sultan married Kara Mustafa Pasha in 1623. She was widowed in 1628, when Kara Mustafa Pasha was executed by her brother, Murad, for some action "contrary to the law of God."

==== Second, third and fourth marriage ====
Upon the execution of her first husband, she married Sarrac Çatalcalı Hasan Pasha in 1629. He was initially associated with the chief black eunuch's household, had risen through the ranks from the saddlery to become a kitchen attendant and later the head courier (çavuşbaşi) in the sultan's service. In 1631, her brother, Murad took steps to break the familial connection between Kösem and Admiral Hasan Pasha. Disturbed by his mother's extensive support for Hasan Pasha, Murad decided to dissolve the marriage. Murad's action against the otherwise successful admiral might have stemmed from his growing inclination to diminish the influence of his inner palace advisors and establish control over significant government officials. In an attempt to appease her son, Kösem reportedly offered him ornately equipped horses and a banquet worth ten thousand aspers. After the death of her second husband, she married Canbuladzade Mustafa Pasha in 1632. He was executed by the orders of her brother, Murad in 1636. After the death of her third husband, Fatma Sultan married Koca Yusuf Pasha in 1637. She was widowed at Yusuf Pasha's death in 1658. Her daily stipend during this time was 430 aspers. In 1643, early in the reign of her brother Sultan Ibrahim, Fatma is recorded, like her sisters Ayşe Sultan and Hanzade Sultan, as receiving the maximum daily stipend for imperial princesses of the time, namely 400 aspers.

In 1647, the three of them as well as their niece, Murad's daughter Kaya Sultan, were subjected, on what was another assault of the protocol on Ibrahim's part, to the indignity of subordination to his concubines. He took away their lands and jewels (presumably to award them to his Hasekis), and made them serve Hümaşah Sultan, the concubine he married, by standing at attention like servants while she ate and fetching and holding the soap, basin and pitcher of water with which she washed her hands. The Sultan then banished them to Edirne Palace because of what he saw as their failure to serve his beloved Hümaşah properly.

==== Fifth marriage ====
One of the most noted of Fatma's seven marriages was with Melek Ahmed Pasha, who was previously married to her niece, Kaya Sultan, in 1662. By that time, she was in her late fifties. The marriage was forcibly arranged against the wishes of both parties, and was an unhappy one, and Melek Ahmed Pasha accused the Grand Vizier Köprülü Mehmed Pasha of having arranged it to punish him. The Grand Vizier himself joked that he had given Melek Ahmed Pasha an elephant to feed.

On the wedding night, Fatma presented Melek Ahmed Pasha her demand of what allowance she wished for herself and her court. He replied that the amount was impossible, upon which she replied that divorce was the only alternative, and demanded he return her dowry to her, which amounted to one year of taxes of Egypt (this was possibly related to the fact that one of her previous husbands, the late Kara Mustafa Pasha, had formerly been a governor of the Egypt province of the Ottoman Empire and was reported to have been forced to pay back the tax proceeds that he had embezzled during his term).

When she was widowed in 1662 shortly thereafter, she sealed his residence and claimed the right to his property, which caused a conflict with the Grand Vizier, who was forced to give in to her demands.

==== Sixth and seventh marriage ====
In June 1663, Fatma Sultan married Vezir Kanbur Mustafa Pasha, the Beylerbeyi of Baghdad. After his death in 1666, she married the Beylerbeyi of Silistre Vezir Közbekçi Yusuf Pasha on 5 September 1667.

== Death ==
Fatma Sultan died in 1670. She is buried in the mausoleum of her father Ahmed, in the Sultan Ahmed Mosque, Istanbul.

== Issue ==
Fatma had a son by her second marriage:

- Sultanzade Hasan Bey; he died in infancy

Fatma Sultan had two sons by her third marriage:

- Sultanzade Canbuladzade Hüseyn Pasha (1633 – 16 February 1680); governor of Buda and Cairo; he married his cousin Ayşe Sultan, a daughter of Sultan Ibrahim
- Sultanzade Canbuladzade Süleyman Bey (1635 – after 1665)

== Charity ==
Fatma Sultan built a fountain on the road around the Ahmed Paşa Mosque in Topkapı.

== In popular culture ==
In the 2016 popular TV series Muhteşem Yüzyıl: Kösem, Fatma is portrayed by Turkish actress Balim Gaye Bayrak.

== See also ==
- List of Ottoman princesses

== Bibliography ==
- Sakaoğlu, Necdet (2008). Bu mülkün kadın sultanları: Vâlide sultanlar, hâtunlar, hasekiler, kadınefendiler, sultanefendiler. Oğlak Yayıncılık. ISBN 978-9-753-29623-6.
- Uluçay, M. Çağatay (1992). Padişahların Kadınları ve Kızları. Ankara: Türk Tarih Kurumu Basımevı. ISBN 978-9-751-60461-3.
