= Christoph Schissler =

German scientific instrument builder

Christoph Schissler (c. 1531 – 14 September 1608) was a German builder of high precision scientific instruments.

== Career ==
His professional life was largely spent in Augsburg where he made navigational instruments such as astrolabes, quadrants, and armillary spheres. He also invented a portable sundial that adjusted to operate on different latitudes between England and Italy.

In 1571 Schissler travelled to the court of Augustus of Saxony in Dresden and in 1583, to the court of Rudolf II in Prague.

In his later years he focused on mapping and surveying Augsburg. He had his own specialist workshop, where his son Hans Christoff would later continue his work.

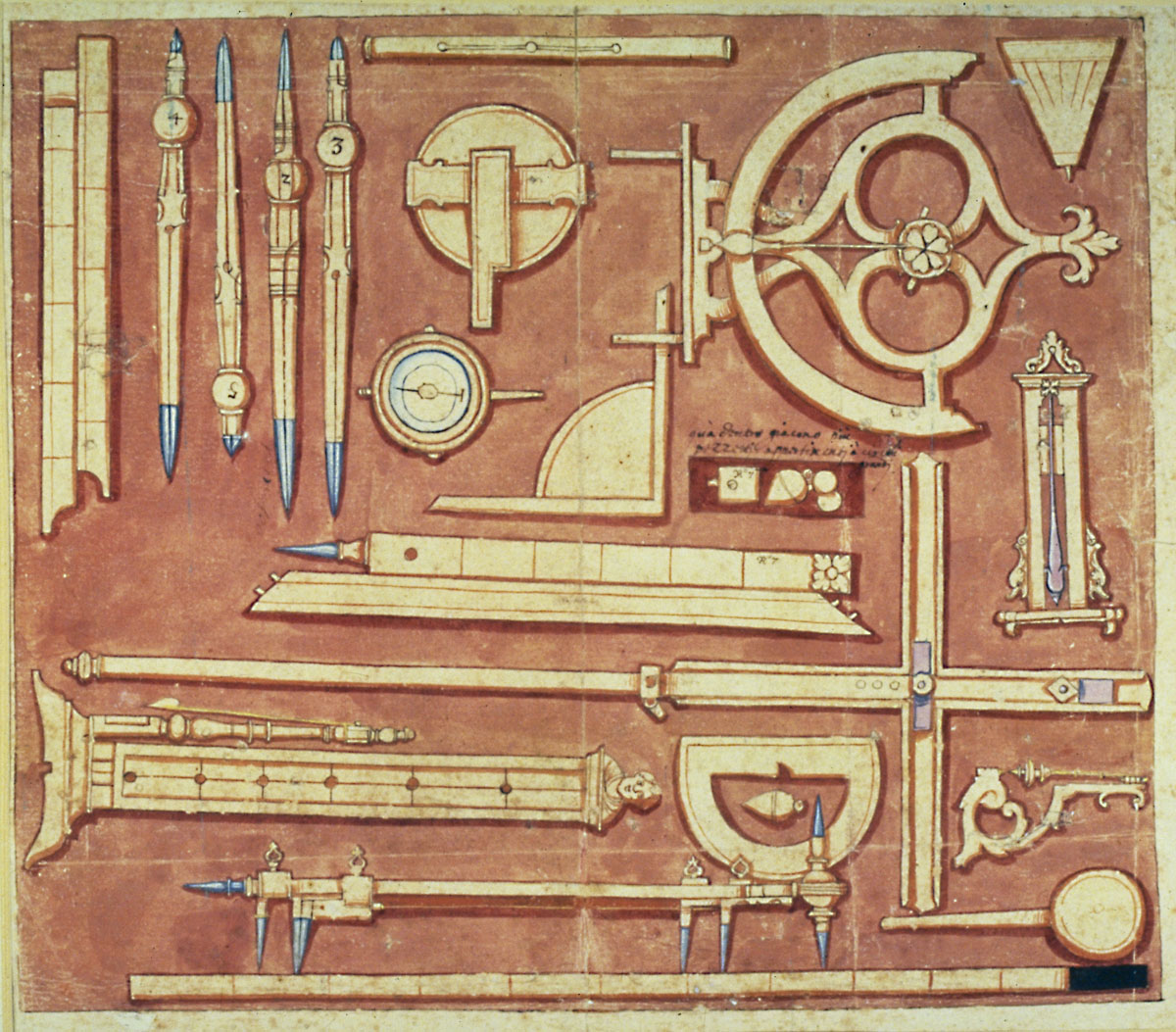
Drawing of the Schissler's Box of Mathematical Instruments preserved in the Museo Galileo

== Legacy ==
Over a hundred of his instruments are preserved today in various museums across the world, including the Museo Galileo and the Victoria and Albert Museum.

A rare gilt brass astrolabe by Schissler was due to be auctioned with an £80,000-120,000 ($119,170-178,756) estimate at Bonhams London on May 19, 2015.
