= Robert Dankoff =

Professor of Near Eastern Department

Robert Dankoff is Professor Emeritus of Ottoman & Turkish Studies, Department of Near Eastern Languages and Civilizations at the University of Chicago.

Robert Dankoff was born on 24 September 1943 in Rochester, New York. In 1964, he received a Bachelor of Arts degree from Columbia University, and in 1971 got a Ph.D. from Harvard. He taught Arabic at Brandeis University as an assistant professor in 1969-1975. He taught Turkish in the University of California (1976-77), and the University of Arizona (1977-1979). He joined the department of Near Eastern languages and civilizations at the University of Chicago in 1979 as an assistant professor, where he became an associate professor in 1982, and a professor in 1987. He taught Turkish, Old Turkish, Ottoman Turkish, Azerbaijani, and Uzbek there until retiring in 2006.

His research interests lie in Ottoman Literature and Turkology. He has published extensively on Turkish texts from Central Asia and the Ottoman Empire, including text editions and translations of portions of the Seyahatname of Evliya Çelebi.

== Honors ==
- Order of Merit of the Republic of Turkey, 20 October 2008
- Honorary doctorate from Çanakkale Onsekiz Mart University, 2021

== Publications ==
- An Ottoman Traveller: Selections from the book of Travels by Evliya Çelebi. Eland Publishing, 2011. ISBN 1906011583
- Ottoman Explorations of the Nile: Evliya Çelebi's Map of the Nile and The Nile Journeys in the Book of Travels (Seyahatname). Gingko Library, 2018. ISBN 1909942162
- From Mahmud Kasgari to Evliya Celebi Studies in Middle Turkic and Ottoman Literatures. Gorgias Press, Piscataway, NJ, 2009. ISBN 9781463216931
- An Ottoman Mentality: The World of Evliya Çelebi (Ottoman Empire and Its Heritage, v. 31) (No. 31) (Brill Academic Publishing, 2004) ISBN 978-9004137158
- Armenian Loanwords in Turkish (Harrassowitz, 1995)
- The Intimate Life of an Ottoman Statesman, Melek Ahmed Pasha, (1588-1662: As Portrayed in Evliya Çelebi's Book of Travels. SUNY Press, 1991. ISBN 978-0791406410
- Wisdom of Royal Glory (Kutadgu Bilig): A Turko-Islamic Mirror for Princes by Yusuf Khass Hajib (Publications of the Center for Middle Eastern Studies, 1983)
