= Ladik =

- District and municipality
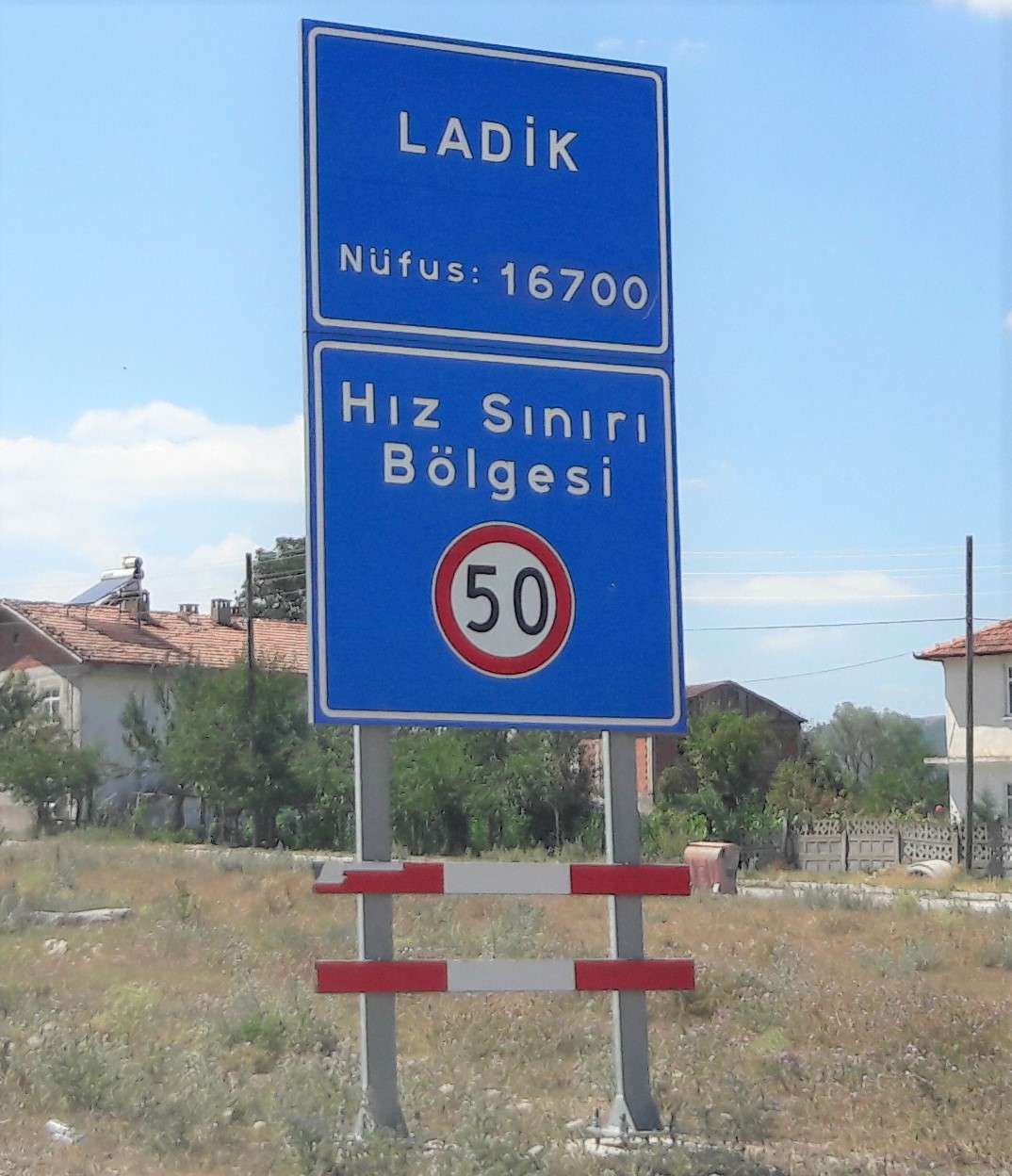

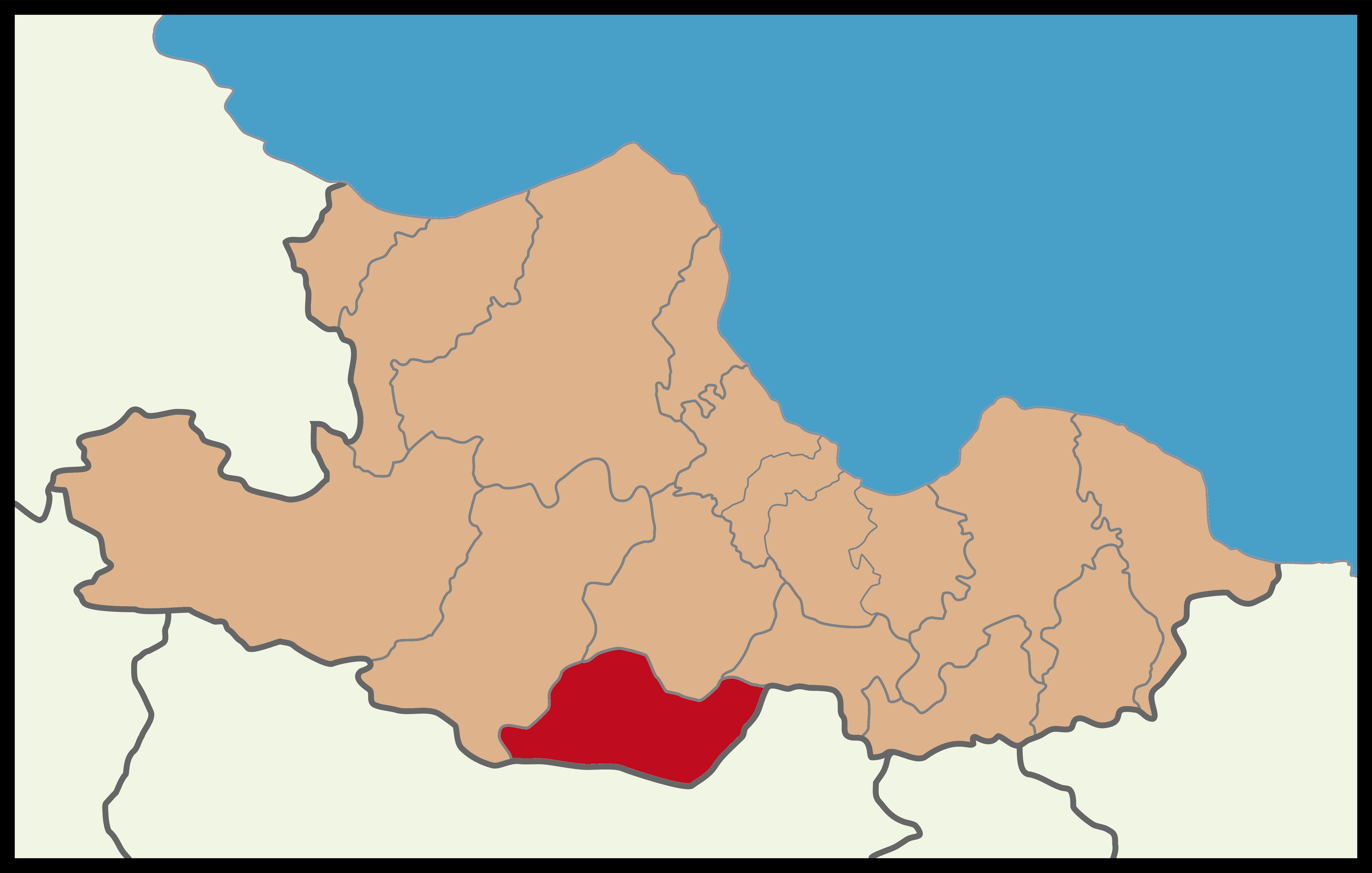
- Map showing Ladik District in Samsun Province

- Location within Turkey
- Coordinates: 40°55′N 35°35′E
- Country: Turkey
- Province: Samsun

Government
  - Mayor: Adnan Topal (AK Party)
- Area: 541 km^{2} (209 sq mi)
- Population (2022): 16,072
  - Density: 29.7/km^{2} (76.9/sq mi)
- Time zone: UTC+3 (TRT)
- Postal code: 55760
- Area code: 0362
- Climate: Csb
- Website: www.ladik.bel.tr

Ladik is a municipality and district of Samsun Province, Turkey. Its area is 541 km^{2}, and its population is 16,072 (2022). It is on the site of the ancient Laodicea Pontica. The mayor is Adnan Topal (AK Party).

== History ==
Laodicea Pontica or Laodicea (Ancient Greek: Λαοδίκεια), also transliterated as Laodíceia and Laodíkeia, was a Hellenistic town in Pontus. The city was founded in the hills (elevation 1000 m) not far west of the lake Stiphane Limne, southwest of Amisus (modern Samsun). It is the birthplace of the Albanian grand vizier Tayyar Mehmed Pasha.

== Composition ==
There are 67 neighbourhoods in Ladik District:

- Ağcakaya
- Ahmetsaray
- Akpınar
- Aktaş
- Akyar
- Alayurt
- Alıçlı
- Arslantaş
- Aşağıgölyazı
- Ayvalı
- Ayvalısokağı
- Bahşi
- Başlamış
- Bolat
- Budakdere
- Büyükalan
- Büyükkızoğlu
- Çadırkaya
- Çakırgümüş
- Çamlıköy
- Cüce
- Daldere
- Deliahmetoğlu
- Derinöz
- Doğankaş
- Eynekaraca
- Günkoru
- Gürün
- Güvenli
- Hacıalipınar
- Hamamayağı
- Hamitköy
- Hasırcı
- Hızarbaşı
- İbi
- İsasofta
- İskaniye
- Kabacagöz
- Karaabdal
- Kıranboğaz
- Kirazpınar
- Kızılsini
- Koğa
- Köseoğlu
- Küçükkızoğlu
- Küpecik
- Kuyucak
- Mazlumoğlu
- Meşepınarı
- Nusratlı
- Oymapınar
- Salur
- Sanayi
- Saray
- Sarıgazel
- Sarıksızoğlu
- Şehreküstü
- Şıhlı
- Soğanlı
- Söğütlü
- Tatlıcak
- Teberoğlu
- Tüfekçidere
- Yenicami
- Yukarıgölyazı
- Yumaklı
- Yuvacık

== See also ==
- List of ancient Greek cities
