= Hanzade Sultan (daughter of Ahmed I) =

Ottoman princess (c.1607–1650)

- Born: c. 1607; Topkapı Palace, Constantinople, Ottoman Empire (present day Istanbul, Turkey)
- Died: 21 September 1650 (aged 42–43); Constantinople, Ottoman Empire
- Burial: Ibrahim I mausoleum, Hagia Sophia
- Spouse: Ladikli Bayram Pasha (m. 1623; died 1638); Nakkaş Mustafa Pasha (m. 1639)
- Issue: first marriage Fülane Hanımsultan second marriage Sultanzade Abdülbaki Bey
Names
- Hanzade Sultan bint Ahmed Han
- Dynasty: Ottoman
- Father: Ahmed I
- Mother: Kösem Sultan
- Religion: Sunni Islam

Hanzade Sultan (Ottoman Turkish: خانزادہ سلطان; c. 1607 – 21 September 1650) was an Ottoman princess, daughter of Sultan Ahmed I (r. 1603–1617) and Kösem Sultan. She was a half-sister of Osman II (r. 1618–1622) and sister of Murad IV (r. 1623–1640) and Ibrahim I (r. 1640–1648), and paternal aunt of Mehmed IV (r. 1648–1687), Suleiman II (r. 1687–1691) and Ahmed II (r. 1691–1695).

== Biography ==
She was born in 1607 in Constantinople as the daughter of Sultan Ahmed I and his consort Kösem Sultan. After her father's death in 1617, she settled in the Old Palace.

Hanzade married Ladliki Bayram Pasha, who was then the agha of the Janissaries in March 1623 in the Old Palace. Her elaborate bridal procession was escorted among the cheering crowds in the streets of Istanbul by the viziers of the sultan. They had a daughter. After Bayram's death in 1638, she married vizier Nakkaş Mustafa Pasha in October 1639 in the Bayram Pasha Palace. By him she had a son, Sultanzade Abdülbaki Bey. Her daily stipend during this time was 430 aspers.

In 1643, early in the reign of her brother Sultan Ibrahim, Hanzade is recorded, like her sisters Ayşe Sultan and Fatma Sultan, as receiving the maximum daily stipend for imperial princesses of the time, namely 400 aspers. Later, around 1647, she fell, for reasons unknown, out of favour and was submitted, alongside her sisters Ayşe and Fatma and niece Kaya Sultan, to the indignity of subordination of his concubines. He took away their lands and wealth, and made them serve his newest favourite, Hümaşah, by standing at attention like servants while she ate and by fetching and holding the soap, basin and the pitcher of water with which she washed her hands. Because of what he believed was failure to serve her properly, the Sultan then banished them to Edirne Palace.

== Death ==
Hanzade Sultan died on 21 September 1650, and was buried in the mausoleum of her brother Sultan Ibrahim in Hagia Sophia.

== See also ==
- List of Ottoman princesses

== Bibliography ==
- Dumas, Juliette (2013). Les perles de nacre du sultanat: Les princesses ottomanes (mi-XVe – mi-XVIIIe siècle).
- Peirce, leslie P. (1993). The Imperial Harem: Women and Sovereignty in the Ottoman Empire. Oxford University Press. ISBN 978-0-195-08677-5.
- Sakaoğlu, Necdet (2008). Bu mülkün kadın sultanları: Vâlide sultanlar, hâtunlar, hasekiler, kadınefendiler, sultanefendiler. Oğlak Yayıncılık. ISBN 978-9-753-29623-6.
