= Öküz Mehmed Pasha (disambiguation) =

Öküz Mehmed Pasha was a 17th-century Ottman grand vizier. Buildings bearing his name are:

- Öküz Mehmed Pasha Caravanserai in Kuşadası, Aydın Province, Turkey
- Öküz Mehmet Pasha Complex in Ulukışla, Niğde Province, Turkey
