= Çorlulu Ali Pasha =

Grand Vizier of the Ottoman Empire from 1706 to 1710

Damat Çorlulu Ali Pasha

Grand Vizier of the Ottoman Empire
- In office 3 May 1706 – 15 June 1710
- Monarch: Ahmed III
- Preceded by: Baltacı Mehmet Pasha
- Succeeded by: Köprülüzade Numan Pasha

Personal details
- Born: c. 1670 Çorlu, Tekirdağ, Turkey
- Died: December 1711 (aged 40–41) Lesbos, Greece
- Spouse: Emine Sultan (m. 1708)

Çorlulu Ali Pasha (c. 1670 – December 1711) was an Ottoman grand vizier who held the office from 1706 to 1710.

== Early life and career ==
As his surname indicates, Ali was born in Çorlu in c. 1670, the son of a peasant or barber. His handsome appearance and intelligence led to his adoption by a member of the court under Sultan Ahmed II (r. 1691–1695). This opened the way to the Galata Palace School, and eventually the Inner Service of the palace itself. Ali rose quickly, from seferli oda to the post of Silahdar Agha (chief sword-bearer) under Mustafa II (r. 1695–1703).

As Silahdar Agha, Çorlulu Ali advanced his office's standing and power considerably: from the Kizlar Agha he assumed the role of intermediary between the Grand Vizier and the Sultan, and from the Kapi Agha he took over control of the palace pages, the iç oğlans. Ali was also charged with reordering the hierarchy of the entire Inner Service.

At the beginning of the revolt known as the Edirne event in 1703, he was dismissed due to the intrigues of the Grand Vizier Rami Mehmed Pasha and the influential Sheikh-ul-Islam, Hacı Feyzullah Efendi, although he acquired the rank of vizier. However, after Mustafa II's overthrow, Sultan Ahmed III (r. 1703–1730) appointed Çorlulu Ali as a "vizier of the dome" (kubbe vezir, i.e., a member of the Imperial Council). He was briefly appointed as the beylerbey (governor-general) of Tripoli (modern Lebanon) in 1704, but quickly returned to Istanbul and resumed his position as "vizier of the dome".

== Grand vizierate ==
In May 1706, he was appointed as Grand Vizier. According to the Encyclopaedia of Islam, he was "the first competent Grand Vizier of the reign", and enjoyed high favour with the Sultan, who in 1708 married his niece Emine Sultan (a daughter of Mustafa II) to him. Thus Ali gained the title damat ("groom") to the Ottoman dynasty.

As Grand Vizier, Çorlulu Ali paid particular attention to rectifying the abuses in the Ottoman army, the reining in of the government budget, and improvements to the Ottoman navy and the Imperial Arsenal. At the same time, however, he was strongly opposed to entering any conflict for the time being. Thus he was accused of missing the opportunities presented by the War of the Spanish Succession, which drew the attention of the Western European powers, to regain the Morea from the Republic of Venice, as well as failing to confront the growing threat of Peter the Great during Charles XII of Sweden's invasion of Russia in the Great Northern War. Indeed, after his defeat at the Battle of Poltava, Charles XII refused to negotiate with Çorlulu Ali, as he believed that he had been promised assistance from the Crimean Khanate, an Ottoman vassal, that had never materialized.

Matters came to a head when Charles XII sought refuge in Ottoman lands. Peter the Great tried to follow him into Ottoman lands, and Charles persuaded the Ottoman government to declare war on Russia. Ali Pasha wasn't able to follow a consistent policy, and the Swedish ambassador accused him of accepting bribes from the Russians.

Having lost the Sultan's confidence, Ali was dismissed in June 1710 and sent to govern Kefe (Feodosia) in the Crimea. But before he was able to reach his new office, the sultan changed his mind and exiled Ali Pasha to the island of Lesbos (in modern Greece), where he was then executed in December 1711.

== Buildings ==
Çorlulu Ali erected a number of monuments, including a school and a fountain at Çorlu, and two Friday mosques in Istanbul: at the Imperial Arsenal, and at the Çarşıkapi quarter, where his tomb is.

== Sources ==
- Bowen, H. (1960). "ʿAlī Pas̲h̲a Čorlulu". In Gibb, H. A. R.; Kramers, J. H.; Lévi-Provençal, E.; Schacht, J.; Lewis, B. & Pellat, Ch. (eds.). The Encyclopaedia of Islam, Second Edition. Volume I: A–B. Leiden: E. J. Brill. p. 394. doi:10.1163/1573-3912_islam_SIM_0530. OCLC 495469456.

Political offices
Preceded by Baltacı Mehmet Pasha	Grand Vizier of the Ottoman Empire; 3 May 1706 – 15 June 1710	Succeeded by Köprülü Numan Pasha
