= Mir alem =

The mîr alem or mîr-i alem (Ottoman Turkish: مير علم) was the standard-bearer of the Ottoman Sultan's insignia. He belonged to the military officials of the outer service (Birûn) of the Ottoman court, and was a post usually filled by pages educated in the palace school who had previously proven their ability in the inner, private service (Enderûn). The mir alem was in charge of the Sultan's personal flag and his horse-tail standards, as well as of Sultan's tent and the military band, with an extensive staff that in the early 17th century numbered 1,063 men. During the appointment of provincial governors, he handed them their own flag and horse-tail standards, as representatives of the Sultan's authority.

== Sources ==
- İnalcık, Halil (2000) [1973]. The Ottoman Empire: The Classical Age, 1300-1600. London: Phoenix Press. ISBN 978-1-8421-2442-0.
