= Deveci =

Deveci or "deveji" literally means "camel driver" in Turkish. It may refer to:

- Deveci, Haymana
- Deveci, Karakoçan
- Deveci, Kıbrıscık
- Deveci, Malkara, mahallah in the Malkara district of Tekirdağ province, Turkey
- Dəvəçi or Şabran
- Deveci Ali Agha (1621–1622), a Janissary Agha
- Durmuş Deveci (born 1964), Turkish physiologist
- Süleyman Deveci, Turkish German journalist and author

== See also ==
- Devetzi Greek surname of Turkish origin with the same meaning
