= Damat =

Ottoman title

Royal and noble ranks in Iran, Turkey, Caucasus, Pakistan and Afghanistan
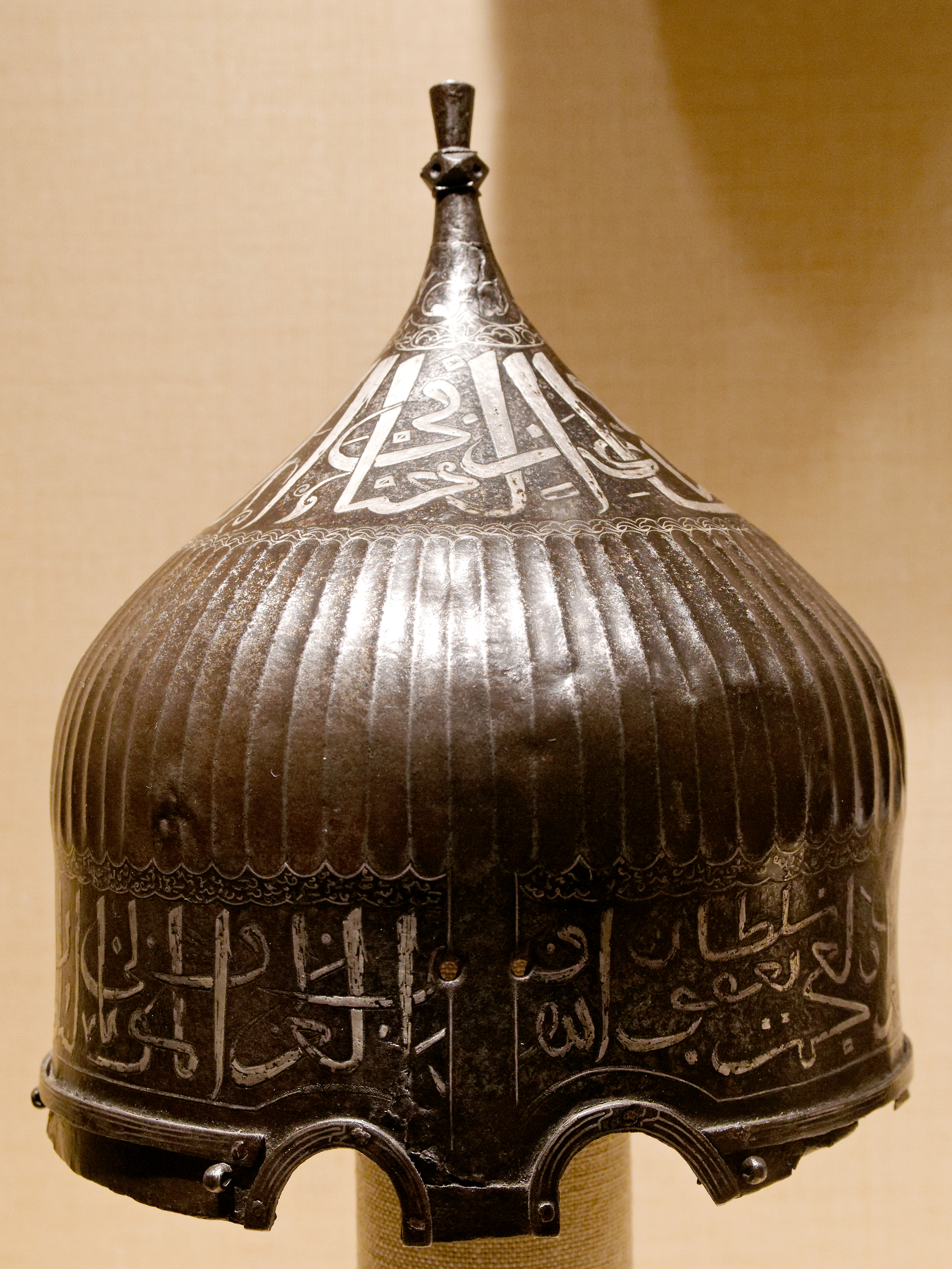
- Emperor: Shahanshah
- High king: Padishah
- King: Shah, Sultan, Sultana,
- Royal prince: Shahzada (Şehzade), Mirza
- Noble prince: Sahibzada
- Nobleman: Nawab, Bey, Begzada
- Royal house: Damat
- Governmental: Lala, Agha, Hazinedar

Damat (Turkish: damat, from Persian: داماد (dâmâd) "bridegroom") was an official Ottoman title for a man who entered the imperial House of Osman by means of marriage, literally becoming the bridegroom of an Ottoman princess, usually a daughter or sister of the Ottoman sultan.

Among others, the following people were damats to the Ottoman dynasty:

- Hersekzade Ahmed Pasha, Grand Vizier (1497–98, 1503–06, 1511, 1512–14, 1515–16)
- Koca Mustafa Pasha, Grand Vizier (1511–12)
- Çorlulu Damat Ali Pasha, Grand Vizier (1706–10)
- Silahdar Damat Ali Pasha, Grand Vizier (1713–16)
- Bayram Pasha, Grand Vizier (1637–38)
- Kara Davud Pasha, Grand Vizier (1622)
- Koca Davud Pasha, Grand Vizier (1482–97)
- Ebubekir Pasha, Kapudan Pasha (1732–33, 1750–51)
- Enver Pasha, Minister of War (1913–18)
- Damat Ferid Pasha, Grand Vizier (1919, 1920)
- Damat Halil Pasha, Grand Vizier (1616–19, 1626–28)
- Damat Hasan Pasha, Grand Vizier (1703–04)
- Yemişçi Hasan Pasha, Grand Vizier (1601–03)
- Küçük Hüseyin Pasha, Kapudan Pasha (1792–1803)
- Damat Ibrahim Pasha, Grand Vizier (1596, 1596–97, 1599–1601)
- Nevşehirli Damat Ibrahim Pasha, Grand Vizier (1718–30)
- Lütfi Pasha, Grand Vizier (1539–41)
- Ibşir Mustafa Pasha, Grand Vizier (1654–55)
- Kara Mustafa Pasha, governor of Egypt (1623, 1624–26)
- Damat Mehmed Ali Pasha, Grand Vizier (1852–53)
- Öküz Mehmed Pasha, Grand Vizier (1614–16, 1619)
- Gümülcineli Damat Nasuh Pasha, Grand Vizier (1611–14)
- Ahmed Nami Bey, the 5th Prime Minister of Syria and 2nd President of Syria (1926–28), and a lecturer of History and Politics
- Köprülü Numan Pasha, Grand Vizier (1710)
- Koca Ragıp Pasha, Grand Vizier (1757–63)
- Rüstem Pasha, Grand Vizier (1544–53, 1555–61)
- Ahmad Beg
- Ughurlu Muhammad

== See also ==
- Yabancı Damat, a popular Turkish television series
- Cici Damat, the Turkish title of the French film Le gendarme se marie
- Berat Albayrak, nicknamed "Damat".
