= Emine Sultan (daughter of Mustafa II) =

Ottoman princess, daughter of Mustafa II

- Born: 1 September 1696; Edirne Palace, Edirne, Ottoman Empire or Belgrade, Ottoman Serbia
- Died: c. 1739 (aged 42–43); Constantinople, Ottoman Empire (now Istanbul, Turkey)
- Burial: Mevlevihane Kapısı, Istanbul
- Spouse: Çorlulu Ali Pasha (m. 1708; died 1711) Recep Pasha (m. 1722; died 1723) Ibrahim Pasha (m. 1724; div. 1724) Abdullah Pasha (m. 1728; died 1736)
- Dynasty: Ottoman
- Father: Mustafa II
- Religion: Sunni Islam

Emine Sultan (Ottoman Turkish: امینه سلطان; 1 September 1696 – c. 1739) was an Ottoman princess, daughter of Sultan Mustafa II and half-sister of Sultans Mahmud I and Osman III of the Ottoman Empire.

== Life ==
=== Birth ===
Emine Sultan was born on 1 September 1696. At the time of her birth her father was traveling to Austria and part of his harem awaited him in Belgrade, while the rest remained in Edirne. Therefore, Emine might have been born either in Belgrade or Edirne. She was the second daughter of Sultan Mustafa II.

In 1703 her father was deposed in favor of his younger brother Ahmed III and she, with her half-sisters, locked up in the Old Palace until her marriage.

=== Marriages ===
When Emine was five, Mustafa had her betrothed to the beylerbey (governor-general) of Damascus, Hasan Pasha. This engagement was annulled in 1701 and the same year she was engaged to Çorlulu Ali Pasha, then her father's sword-bearer.

On 8 April 1708, on her uncle Sultan Ahmed III's behest, Emine was wed to Çorlulu Ali Pasha, then Grand Vizier. She was 12 and her husband 38. Both Emine's trousseau and her wedding processions headed for the grand vizier's palace which was just across the road from the Alay Köşkü. Both processions, led by top dignitaries, left from the Imperial Gate, passing by the Cebehane (the Church of St Irene), the Baths of Hagia Sophia, and through the street called Soğukçeşme to reach the grand vizier's palace. Her husband gifted her diamonds, rubies, emeralds and other jewels, plus 2.000 piece of gold.

After Ali Pasha's death in 1711, Emine married Recep Pasha, the beylerbey of Trabzon Eyalet in 1712, after, Ibrahim Pasha in 1724. She divorced one of them almost immediately, without even seeing him to warn him, because she judged that his organization of the pilgrimage to Mecca was "detestable" and that, for this, he had shamed himself, her and the whole imperial family. Finally, she married Abdullah Pasha on 1 June 1728. The latter died in 1736.

No children were born of these marriages.

After her fourth marriage she chose not to remarry.

=== Charity ===
In 1715, Emine commissioned a fountain near the Çivizade Mosque in Topkapı.

== Death ==
Emine Sultan died in 1739, and was buried in Mevlevihane Kapısı, Istanbul.

== See also ==
- List of Ottoman princesses

== Sources ==
- Duindam, Jeroen; Artan, Tülay; Kunt, Metin (August 11, 2011). Royal Courts in Dynastic States and Empires: A Global Perspective. BRILL. ISBN 978-9-004-20622-9.
- Sakaoğlu, Necdet (2008). Bu mülkün kadın sultanları: Vâlide sultanlar, hâtunlar, hasekiler, kadınefendiler, sultanefendiler. Oğlak Yayıncılık. ISBN 978-9-753-29623-6.
- Uluçay, Mustafa Çağatay (2011). Padişahların kadınları ve kızları. Ankara: Ötüken. ISBN 978-9-754-37840-5.
