= Sofu Mehmed Pasha (governor) =

Ottoman politician (died 1626)

Sofu Mehmed Pasha or Mehmed Pasha the Ascetic (died 1626) was an Ottoman administrator. Born and raised in Razgrad (today in Bulgaria), Mehmed Pasha served as the Ottoman governor of Egypt Eyalet (1611 – February 1615), Rumelia Eyalet (1617), Sivas Eyalet (1617–19), and Budin Eyalet (1624–26).

Apart from his governorships, Mehmed Pasha was appointed as a vizier in 1611 and served as the kaymakam to the Grand Vizier (sadâret kaymakamı) from sometime in the 1610s until late 1617, when he was appointed as third vizier. He was reappointed as sadâret kaymakamı in 1619, serving until his appointment as governor of Budin in 1624. He died in 1626.

== See also ==
- List of Ottoman governors of Egypt

Political offices
Preceded by Öküz Mehmed Pasha	Ottoman Governor of Egypt; 1611–1615	Succeeded by Nişancı Ahmed Pasha
