= Recep Pasha =

Recep Pasha (also transliterated in the past as Rajab Pasha or Ragab Pasha or Redjep Pasha or Redjeb Pasha, or Rajab Bacha or even Rajab Basha; died 1726) was an Ottoman statesman.

Recep Pasha became a vizier in September 1707 and served as the Ottoman governor of Diyarbekir Eyalet (1707–10, 1725), Van Eyalet (1710–11), Sivas Eyalet (1711–12, 1726), Trabzon Eyalet (1712–13, 1724–25), Sanjak of Teke (1713–14), Sanjak of Jerusalem (1714–16), Damascus Eyalet (1716, 1718), Aleppo Eyalet (1719–1720, 1721–24), Egypt Eyalet (1720–21), and Tbilisi (1724).

He was of Albanian origin. He married Emine Sultan, the daughter of Ottoman Sultan Mustafa II.

== Governorship of Egypt ==
According to al-Jabarti, upon arrival in Egypt as governor, Recep Pasha was ordered by the Sultan Ahmed III to audit the accounts of his predecessor, Dellak Ali Pasha, and then kill him, as well as plan the assassination of a local bey named Ismail Bey ibn Iwaz and his partisans. Recep Pasha indeed proceeded to audit Dellak Ali Pasha and had him executed by decapitation, allegedly sending his skinned head to the sultan in Constantinople. Ali Pasha's body was buried in the City of the Dead necropolis, reportedly under the name "Ali Pasha al-Mazlum" (Ali Pasha the Oppressed).

Next, Recep Pasha asked a man named Mehmed Çerkes how to go about assassinating ibn Iwaz and his partisans. After hammering out a plan, which involved getting ibn Iwaz bey to a remote location and sending men to kill him there, the two executed it but failed to kill ibn Iwaz. Soon afterwards, Recep Pasha was dismissed from the governorship, being reappointed as governor of Aleppo.

== In Aleppo ==
Rajab Bacha had the fountain at the entrance of Khan Al-Sābūn restored. He also had a house constructed in Baḥsitā. The house was renovated in 2006 and has become a building for the Cultural Center ever since.

The Rajab Bacha family of Aleppo descends from the governor Rajab Bacha.

== See also ==
- List of Ottoman governors of Egypt
- List of Ottoman governors of Damascus

Political offices
Preceded by Dellak Ali Pasha	Wali of Egypt; 1720–1721	Succeeded by Nişancı Mehmed Pasha
