= Nasuh Pasha =

Ottoman statesman of Albanian origin

Damat Nasuh Pasha

Grand Vizier of the Ottoman Empire
- In office 5 August 1611 – 17 October 1614
- Monarch: Ahmed I
- Preceded by: Kuyucu Murad Pasha
- Succeeded by: Öküz Mehmed Pasha

Personal details
- Born: Gümülcine
- Died: 17 October 1614
- Spouse: Ayşe Sultan (m. 1612)

Nasuh Pasha (died 17 October 1614) was an Ottoman statesman who served as a grand vizier of the Ottoman Empire from 5 August 1611 until 17 October 1614. He was from Gümülcine (modern Komotini) and was a damat to the Ottoman dynasty, as he married an Ottoman princess. He was executed for corruption by Ahmed I in 1614.

== Biography ==
Nasuh Paha was born in Gümülcine. His origins are disputed. Some historians claim that he was the son of a Greek priest from Gümülcine, while others suggest that he was of Albanian origin. He went to Constantinople at a young age and obtained minor assignments from the menagerie. Due to the support of his friend Mehmed Agha, he quickly rose in rank and was soon appointed voivod of the Qaḍāʾ of Zile, in Anatolia, and then governor of Fülek in Hungary. He married the daughter of Kurdish prince Mir Sheref, becoming rich and powerful, which made him proud and cruel.

In 1602 he was appointed governor of Sivas, in 1603 of Aleppo and in 1606 of Diyarbekir. In 1606, he was appointed third vizier and serasker of the expedition to Persia, but before leaving he was sent to suppress the revolt in Anatolia; for a betrayal by the Kurds he lost a battle and until 1608 he was unable to rejoin the army of the Grand Vizier Kuyucu Murad Pasha who received him coldly.

In 1610 he asked Sultan Ahmed I to be appointed grand vizier in exchange for 40,000 ducats and the expenses of the army, but the sultan communicated this to the grand vizier who requested such sums as a fine. But the Grand Vizier died shortly after (5 August 1611) at the age of 76 and Nasuh was appointed to the post. He married Ahmed I's daughter, Ayşe Sultan (1612). He mercilessly repressed his real or imaginary adversaries. He was brave, eloquent and dynamic but at the same time irritable, violent and unable to speak in a low voice, always looking to humiliate others. He amassed enormous wealth and considered himself chosen to rule. Traveler Pietro Della Valle described him in his accounts of his time in Constantinople:

"The First Vizier, above all others, who was then Nasuh Pasha, son-in-law of the Grand Signor, came last of all, with a large and glittering cavalcade, at the end of which he advanced on his own with much gravity. He was a tall, fat man, as he appeared on horseback, of swarthy complexion, with a black beard and severe face, whose looks well revealed his cruel spirit and rigour, making him feared by the people and little loved by most."

— Pietro Della Valle, Viaggi, Part 1: Turkey, letter II

In 1613, he led a campaign against the rebellious Yazidis of Sinjar although he ultimately failed to subdue them. The sultan decided to remove him from his post and had him strangled by the chief of his bodyguards, the Bostanji-bashi, on October 17, 1614. Nasuh Pasha's properties were confiscated.

== See also ==
- List of Ottoman grand viziers
- Treaty of Nasuh Pasha

Political offices
Preceded by Kuyucu Murad Pasha	Grand Vizier of the Ottoman Empire; 5 August 1611 – 17 October 1614	Succeeded by Öküz Mehmed Pasha
