= Faruk Nafiz Çamlıbel =

Turkish poet, author and politician (1898–1973)

- Born: 18 May 1898; Istanbul, Ottoman Empire
- Died: 8 November 1973 (aged 75); Istanbul, Turkey
- Occupations: Poet, author

Faruk Nafiz Çamlıbel (18 May 1898 – 8 November 1973) was a leading Turkish poet, author and later politician. He is one of the Five Syllabists. Together with Behçet Kemal Çağlar, he wrote the lyrics of the Tenth Anniversary March. He served as a member of parliament for Istanbul during the 8th, 9th, 10th, and 11th terms of the Turkish Grand National Assembly (TBMM).

== Biography ==
Faruk Nafiz Çamlıbel was born in Istanbul, Ottoman Empire, on 18 May 1898. His mother, Fatma Ruhiye, was the daughter of a merchant named Necati Bey and his father, Süleyman Nazif Bey, was a public servant at the Ministry of Forestry. Faruk Nafiz graduated from Bakırköy Secondary School and Hadika-i Meşveret High School. Having studied medicine for a while, he quit his education and decided to work in the newspaper Ati. From 1919 to 1920 he was among the contributors of Büyük Mecmua which was a magazine supporting the Independence War. He was among the contributors to the women's magazine Süs between 1923 and 1924.

From 1946 to 1960 Faruk Nafiz was a member of the Turkish Parliament for the Democrat Party. Following the military coup on 27 May 1960 he was arrested together with other members of the party. He was imprisoned in Yassıada and was then transferred to Kayseri and was released from the prison without any charge after sixteen months.

Faruk Nafiz Çamlıbel died on board a ship on 8 November 1973 and was buried at the Zincirlikuyu cemetery on 11 November.

== Literary Career ==
He wrote his first poems in aruz meter. He was influenced by Cenap Şahabettin and especially Yahya Kemal. His poem "Doğu'nun Sultanları", published in the magazine "Edebiyat-ı Umumiye", was his first work that helped him gain a place in the literary circle. He collected the poems he wrote with Aruz in his books "Doğu'nun Sultanları" in 1918, "Dinle Neyden" and "Gönülden Gönüle" in 1919. Later, he moved away from the aruz meter and adopted the syllable meter and the idea of simplifying the Turkish language and moving away from foreign words and patterns. He added a sonic richness to the syllable, especially the 7+7 pattern, in his poems.[5] He made it his mission to create and develop national literature and became known as one of the "Five Syllables" in the history of Turkish literature, along with Enis Behiç Koryürek, Halit Fahri Ozansoy, Yusuf Ziya Ortaç, Orhan Seyfi Orhon. The artist expresses the issues he draws from the lives of the people, again in the words and verse styles of the people. The famous poem "Sanat", which brought brand new views, is considered the first conscious declaration of patriotic poetry. He has an attitude that is closed to Western influences and open to Turkish folk poetry. The main themes he deals with in his poems are love, longing, nature, death, heroism and passion. He was recognized as the only strong love poet in literature between 1918 and 1930. He became famous for his poems that combine emotion and thought and deal with romantic and realistic subjects and lives. He is known for his successful similes, such as in his poem "Yolcu ile Arabacı", where he likens the passenger to the soul and the coachman to the body. In addition to poetry, he also wrote plays in which he dealt with the love of homeland and nation or focused on social realities. The lyrics, which he wrote together with his student Behçet Kemal from Kayseri High School in 1933, were composed by Cemal Reşit Rey and the work won the anthem competition organized for the 10th anniversary celebrations of the Republic of Turkey. The author's only novel is "Yıldız Yağmuru", published in 1936. It is thought that he talked about his love for the poet Şuküfe Nihal Hanım in this novel.

== Bibliography ==
Poetry

- "Şarkın Sultanları" (1918)
- "Gönülden Gönüle" (1919)
- "Dinle Neyden" (1919)
- "Çoban Çeşmesi" (1926)
- "Suda Halkalar" (1928)
- "Bir Ömür Böyle Geçti" (1933)
- "Elimle Seçtiklerim" (1934)
- "Akarsu" (1936)
- "Tatlı Sert" (Mizahi Şiirler, 1938)
- "Akıncı Türküleri" (1938)
- "Heyecan ve Sükun" (1959)
- "Zindan Duvarları" (1967)
- "Han Duvarları" (1969)

Theatre plays

- "Canavar" (1925)
- "Akın" (1932)
- "Özyurt" (1932)
- "Kahraman" (1933)
- "Yayla Kartalı" (1945)
- "İlk Göz Ağrısı" (1946)

Performances

- "Bir Demette Beş Çiçek" (1933)
- "Yangın" (1933)

Novels

- "Yıldız Yağmuru" (1936)
- "Ayşe'nin Doktoru" (1949)

== See also ==
- List of contemporary Turkish poets
- Öküz Mehmet Pasha Complex
