= Öküz Mehmed Pasha =

Grand Vizier of the Ottoman Empire (1614–1616, 1619)

Öküz · Kara · Kul Kıran · Damat Mehmed Pasha
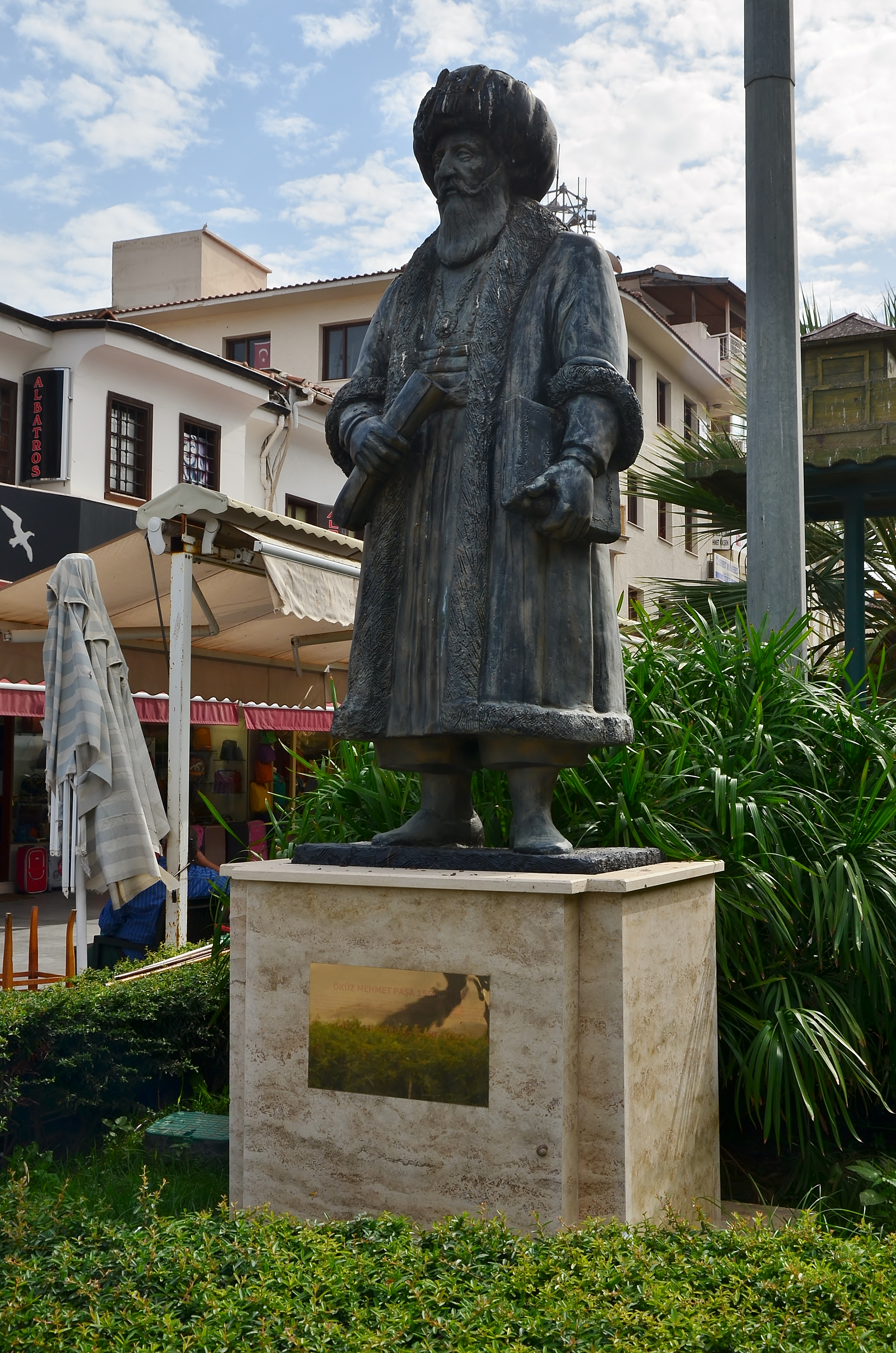
- Statue of Öküz Mehmed Pasha in Kuşadası next to the caravanserai named after him.

Grand Vizier of the Ottoman Empire
- In office 18 January 1619 – 23 December 1619
- Monarch: Osman II
- Preceded by: Damat Halil Pasha
- Succeeded by: Güzelce Ali Pasha
- In office 17 October 1614 – 17 November 1616
- Monarch: Ahmed I
- Preceded by: Nasuh Pasha
- Succeeded by: Damat Halil Pasha

Ottoman Governor of Egypt
- In office 1607–1611
- Monarch: Ahmed I
- Preceded by: Yemenli Hasan Pasha
- Succeeded by: Sofu Mehmed Pasha

Personal details
- Born: Istanbul, Ottoman Empire
- Died: 1621 Aleppo, Ottoman Empire
- Spouse: Gevherhan Sultan (m. 1612)
- Children: Sultanzade Fülan Bey

Military service
- Allegiance: Ottoman Army
- Rank: Silahdar

"Öküz" Damat Mehmed Pasha ("Mehmed Pasha the Ox"), also known as Kara Mehmed Pasha ("the Black") or "Kul Kıran" Mehmed Pasha ("the Slave-breaker"), was an Ottoman Turkish statesman, administrator, and military figure of the early 17th century. He served as Grand Vizier of the Ottoman Empire twice: October 17, 1614 – November 17, 1616 (during the reign of Sultan Ahmed I), and January 18, 1619 – December 23, 1619 (during the reign of Osman II). He also served as the Ottoman governor of Egypt from 1607 to 1611.

Mehmed's nickname, "Kul Kıran" (slave-breaker), came from his success in crushing the mutiny in Egypt during the early 1600s. Soldiers were often known as kul, meaning slave.

== Background ==
Mehmed was born in the Karagümrük district of Istanbul. He was of Turkish ancestry. His father was reportedly an oxen blacksmith. He was nicknamed "Black" and "Ox" by his enemies, referencing his father's profession. Before beginning his career in government, Mehmed served as a silahdar, a high-ranking position responsible for safeguarding the sultan.

In 1612, he married Gevherhan Sultan, the daughter of Sultan Ahmed I and Kösem Sultan. The couple had a son who died in infancy.

== Governor of Egypt ==
Before his first term as grand vizier, Mehmed was appointed as Ottoman governor of Egypt in 1607, a post he held until 1611. In 1604, three years before he assumed office, the governor of Ottoman Egypt, Maktul Hacı Ibrahim Pasha, was murdered by mutinying sipahi soldiers from his own troops. This event caused three years of instability in Egypt, with the subsequent two governors, Hadım Mehmed Pasha and Yemenli Hasan Pasha, unable to completely quell the rebellion.

Upon assuming office, Mehmed's strong leadership allowed him to suppress the sipahis and abolish the illegal 'tulba' protection tax they had been imposing on the Egyptian countryside. After landing at Alexandria, he gained public support by visiting the tombs of local saints and treating the Mamluks well, ordering repairs on Mamluk-built buildings and structures. He then proceeded to execute district governors who had allowed the sipahis to impose the tulba and warned others of the same fate.

Tensions peaked in February 1609, when the rebels gathered in the city of Tanta and met at the tomb of Ahmad al-Badawi, Egypt's most popular Sheikh and Sufi mystic, to swear resistance to Mehmed's efforts. They then began to gather troops and pillage villages for supplies. Mehmed also gathered troops, although some of his officers suggested diplomacy, which Mehmed agreed to. He sent a mufti named Altıparmak Mehmed Efendi and an officer to negotiate with the rebels. The mufti advised the rebels to give in to "those in authority," and upon their refusal, Mehmed's forces began to mobilize.

Mehmed's forces met the rebels just north of Cairo. The rebels, discouraged, lost the battle, and the pasha's forces summarily executed over 250 of them, while others were later exiled to Yemen.

In the aftermath, Mehmed became known as Kul Kıran ("slavebreaker" in Turkish) for subjugating the Mamluks and the soldiers to Ottoman rule. He promoted public works and attempted to reform the fiscal and military organization of the Egypt Eyalet, reducing the number of local beys to 12, although this measure was later abandoned. In 1611, he was recalled to the capital, Constantinople, by the sultan.

== Grand Vizierates ==
Mehmed was Grand Vizier of the Ottoman Empire from October 17, 1614, to November 17, 1616, and again from January 18, 1619, to December 23, 1619. While in office, he was usually called Kara Mehmed Pasha; the nickname "ox" was invented behind his back (though he almost certainly overheard it) due to his heavy build and his father's profession as a blacksmith for cattle in the Karagümrük quarter of Constantinople. History retained this nickname rather than Kara, which means "black" in Turkish and may refer to one's complexion or hair or, figuratively, to courage and daring.

One episode during his time as grand vizier involved an attack on Vienna with only 47 raiders, without informing the sultan or any other authority in the Ottoman capital. It ended in complete failure and nearly cost him his life. Some historians consider this foray a third siege of Vienna by the Ottoman Turks, alongside the better-known incidents, undertaken first by sultan Süleyman the Magnificent in 1529 and later by grand vizier Kara Mustafa Pasha in 1683.

== First Grand Vizierate ==
After the execution of Nasuh Pasha, Mehmed was made grand vizier on October 17, 1614. An ambassador, İncili Çavuş, had been sent to Persia in 1612, but had not sent back word for two years, nor had Persia sent tribute. For this reason, Mehmed was ordered east with an army. In the meantime, word came that İncili Çavuş and a Persian ambassador had arrived in Van. Mehmed’s expedition was not called off, however, and the army set out in June 1615. The army wintered in Maraş and set out again in April 1616, reaching Erivan in September 1616. On the advice of the agha of the Janissaries, Mehmed had not brought heavy artillery or siege weapons. Erivan was besieged for a month or two (44, 55, or 60 days), but unsuccessfully, because of a lack of weapons. The Ottomans agreed to a reduction in tribute from Persia and retreated to Erzurum in November 1616. Mehmed was dismissed as grand vizier for this failure, 17 November 1616.

== Governor of Aidin ==
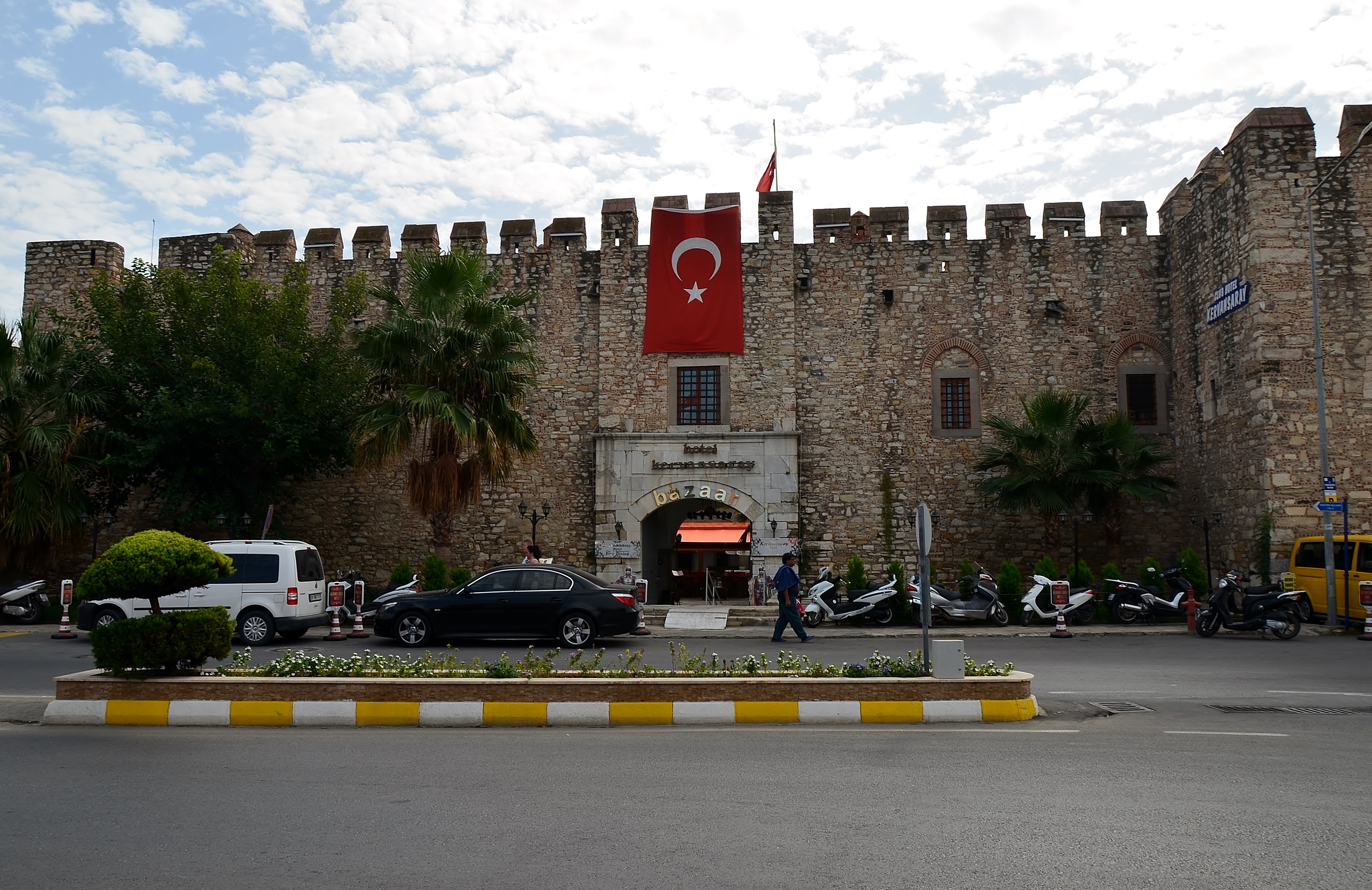
Öküz Mehmed Pasha Caravanserai in Kuşadası.

Between his two terms as grand vizier, Mehmed held the office of governor of Aidin Vilayet (then a province covering a large part of western Anatolia). His governorship is marked by the construction of a caravanserai in Kuşadası, named the Öküz Mehmed Pasha Caravanserai after him, intended to attract international trade through the port. Over time, trade shifted much more towards the port of İzmir due to the preference displayed by Europe and merchants. The caravanserai in Kuşadası is used as a luxury hotel and shopping center today. He also had another caravanserai built in Ulukışla on the way to a campaign against the Safavids during the Ottoman–Safavid War (1603–18), which eventually ended with a decisive Ottoman defeat.

== Second Grand Vizierate ==
When Grand Vizier Halil Pasha was dismissed, Mehmed was appointed in his place on January 18, 1619. During this viziership, Mehmed began coinage reform and finalized the Treaty of Serav with Persia. However, later in 1619, Mehmed fell out with the sultan’s current favorite, Güzelce Ali Pasha. This conflict led to Mehmed’s dismissal and Ali’s appointment as grand vizier by Sultan Osman II on December 23, 1619.

== Death and Burial ==
The new grand vizier had Mehmed's property confiscated and had him sent away from Istanbul to be governor of Aleppo. In Aleppo, Mehmed suffered financial difficulties and illness and died within one and a half years. He was buried near the Sheikh Abu Bakr Takiyya in Aleppo. (His wife was then married to Recep Pasha on December 9, 1621.)

== Legacy ==
Mehmed funded and directed civil, religious, and military repair and construction in many of the places to which he was connected, such as ten mosques and mescits, foundation houses (vakıf evler), hamams, wells, water ways, fountains, shops, bakeries, inns, schools, and mills. Some of these works include

- a complex (külliye) made up of a mosque, fountain, and school in Karagümrük, Istanbul (burned in the Balat fire of 1729, but with the mosque reconstructed in 1987)
- a complex in Ulukışla, Niğde, with caravanserai, mosque, school, covered market (arasta), hamam, madrasa, fountain, bakery, coffeehouse, soup kitchen, and zawiya (the school, bakery, coffeehouse, soup kitchen and zawiya no longer standing)
- a caravanserai in Kuşadası, with mosque, school, hamam, han, textile market, bakery, coffeehouse, houses, warehouses, rooms, shops, and a mill (the mosque, hamam, and han still standing)
- barracks for the Janissary and Azab corps in Cairo
- mosques in Egypt
- a vikâle (a kind of "city caravanserai" or "trade center") in Rashid, Egypt
- facilities for travelers along the roads to Mecca in Egypt and Syria
- a Mevlevi zawiya with shops in Cairo
- a mosque on Chios
- fountains in the Çanakkale region, including one in Kilitbahir known as the Damat İbrahim Paşa Fountain

== See also ==
- List of Ottoman grand viziers
- List of Ottoman governors of Egypt
- Öküz Mehmed Pasha Caravanserai

Political offices
Preceded by Yemenli Hasan Pasha	Ottoman Governor of Egypt; 1607–1611	Succeeded by Sofu Mehmed Pasha
Preceded by Nasuh Pasha	Grand Vizier of the Ottoman Empire; 17 October 1614 – 17 November 1616	Succeeded by Damat Halil Pasha
Preceded by Damat Halil Pasha	Grand Vizier of the Ottoman Empire; 18 January 1619 – 23 December 1619	Succeeded by Güzelce Ali Pasha
