= Birûn =

Birûn (Ottoman Turkish: بیرون, from the Persian word for 'outside') was the term used in the Ottoman Empire to designate the "Outer Service" of the imperial court, concerned with the public affairs of the Ottoman sultans, as opposed to the private "Inner Service" (Enderûn). Its name derives from the location of its offices in the outer court of the Topkapi Palace, which in turn echoed the arrangements of the palace in Edirne, the Ottomans' second capital.

The scope of the Birûn was very extensive. As the Ottomanist Halil İnalcık writes, "The Outside Service comprised all the organizations regulating the sultan's relations with the outside world, comprising governmental and ceremonial offices and the sultan's standing army". The Birûn included a number of senior officials, who had typically previously been enrolled as pages, educated in the palace school, and served in the Enderûn. These were:

- the Agha of the Janissaries (yeniçeri aghasi), commander of the Janissary Corps
- the Keeper of the Sultan's Standard (mir alem)
- the Chief Doorkeeper (kapıcı başı) and his lieutenant (kapıcılar kethüdası)
- the Master of the Horse (mirahur)
- the Chief Falkoner (çakırcı başı)
- the Chief Taster (çeşnici başı)
- the Chief Usher (çavuş başı)
- the Aghas commanding the household cavalry divisions (sipahi bölükleri aghaları)
- the Chief Armourer (cebeci başı)
- the Chief Gunner (topçu başı)
- the Chief Coachman (arabaci başı)

In addition, a special corps existed in the müteferrikas, sons of serving pashas or vassal rulers, who were enrolled in the Outer Service, received uniforms and pay, and participated in court ceremonies.

== Sources ==
- İnalcık, Halil (2000) [1973]. The Ottoman Empire: The Classical Age, 1300-1600. London: Phoenix Press. ISBN 978-1-8421-2442-0.
- Lewis, Bernard (1960). "Bīrūn". In Gibb, H. A. R.; Kramers, J. H.; Lévi-Provençal, E.; Schacht, J.; Lewis, B. & Pellat, Ch. (eds.). The Encyclopaedia of Islam, Second Edition. Volume I: A–B. Leiden: E. J. Brill. doi:10.1163/1573-3912_islam_SIM_1437. OCLC 495469456.
- Özcan, Abdülkadir (1992). "Bîrun". TDV Encyclopedia of Islam, Vol. 6 (Beşi̇r Ağa Cami̇i̇ – Câfer Paşa Tekkesi̇) (in Turkish). Istanbul: Presidency of Religious Affairs, Centre for Islamic Studies. p. 205. ISBN 978-975-389-433-3.
- Parry, V. J. (1965). "Enderūn". In Lewis, B.; Pellat, Ch. & Schacht, J. (eds.). The Encyclopaedia of Islam, Second Edition. Volume II: C–G. Leiden: E. J. Brill. pp. 697–698. OCLC 495469475.
