= Öküz Mehmet Pasha Complex =

- Öküz Mehmet Paşa Külliyesi
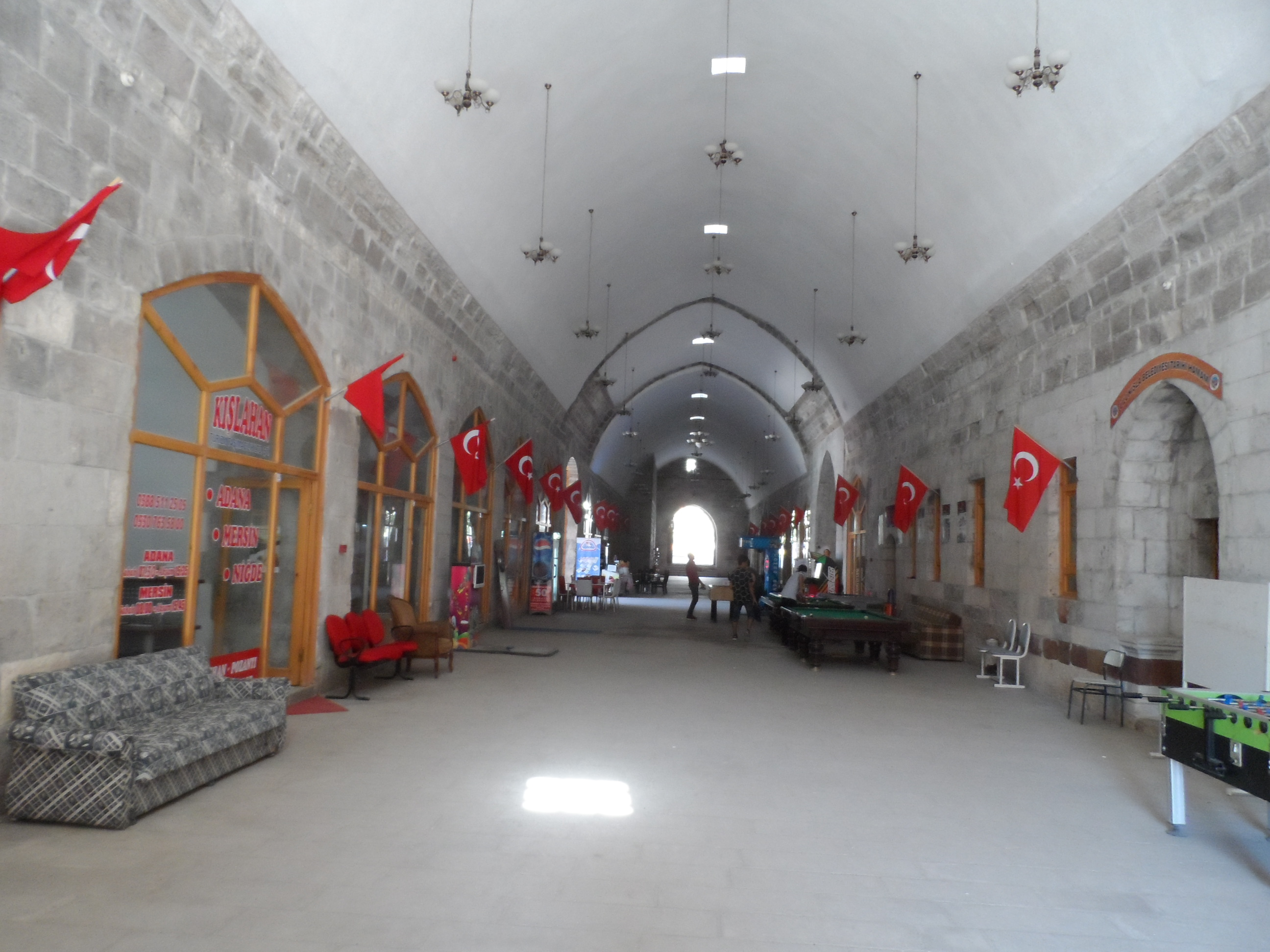
- Arasta section of the complex
- Interactive map of the Öküz Mehmet Pasha Complex area
- Alternative names: Öküz Mehmet Pasha Caravanserai

General information
- Type: Complex
- Architectural style: Ottoman architecture
- Location: Ulukışla, Niğde Province, Turkey, İsmet İnönü Cad.
- Coordinates: 37.5472°N 34.4818°E
- Elevation: 1,435 metres (4,708 ft)
- Construction started: 1615
- Completed: 1616
- Renovated: 2011
- Owner: Directorate of Foundations

Dimensions
- Other dimensions: 60 by 60 square metres (650 sq ft × 650 sq ft) cloistered courtyard +80 by 20 square metres (860 sq ft × 220 sq ft) arasta excluding the mosque and the bath

Design and construction
- Main contractor: Öküz Mehmet Pasha

Öküz Mehmet Pasha Complex (Turkish: Öküz Mehmet Paşa Külliyesi), alternatively known as Öküz Mehmet Pasha Caravanserai, is a külliye (building complex) in Ulukışla, Turkey. According to Ulukışla municipality page the name Ulukışla refers to the complex. In the past a part of the complex was used as military barracks (Turkish: kışla) and the Ulukışla citizens called the complex Ulukışla ("Great barracks") which eventually became the name of the settlement.

== Location ==
The complex is situated in the center of Ulukışla district of Niğde Province about 150 m (490 ft) north of the main state highway D750.

== History ==
The commissioner of the complex was Öküz Mehmet Pasha (died in 1619), a grand vizier of the Ottoman Empire. (There is another caravanserai bearing his name in Kuşadası) During his campaign to Safavid dynasty of Persia (modern Iran) in 1615, he decided to spend the winter in Ulukışla. But he was unable to find adequate barracks for his soldiers and he had to distribute the troops to nearby towns. To solve the problem for the future campaigns he had the complex built in 1616. According to another theory about the origin of the complex, Ulukışla was the birth place of Öküz Mehmet Pasha and he tried to rebuild his home town. The complex underwent a renovation in 1753. In 2011 it was restored by the Directorate of Foundations. Presently the complex is used as a market place . Both the governorship and the municipality have offices in the building.

== The complex ==
The complex is situated on a gentle slope from the north. The main building is a rectangular arasta (Ottoman bazaar) situated in west to east direction. North of the bazaar, there is a square-plan courtyard with cloister. The dormitories encircle the courtyard. South of the bazaar there is a hamam hamam (bathhouse) and a mosque. Originally there was a golden finial in the bath. But it was later stolen. The heated water in the hamam was used to heat the complex. The complex had a sewage system. The total ground area of the complex is 9,541 square metres (102,700 sq ft).

== In literature ==
Han Duvarları ("Walls of Caravansarai") is a well-known poem of the renowned Turkish poet Faruk Nafiz Çamlıbel (1898–1973). Çamlıbel wrote this poem in 1925 after his travel from Ulukışla to another city. It is claimed that Çamlıbel was inspired by Öküz Mehmet Pasha Complex.
