= Silahdar Agha =

Palace office of the Ottoman Empire

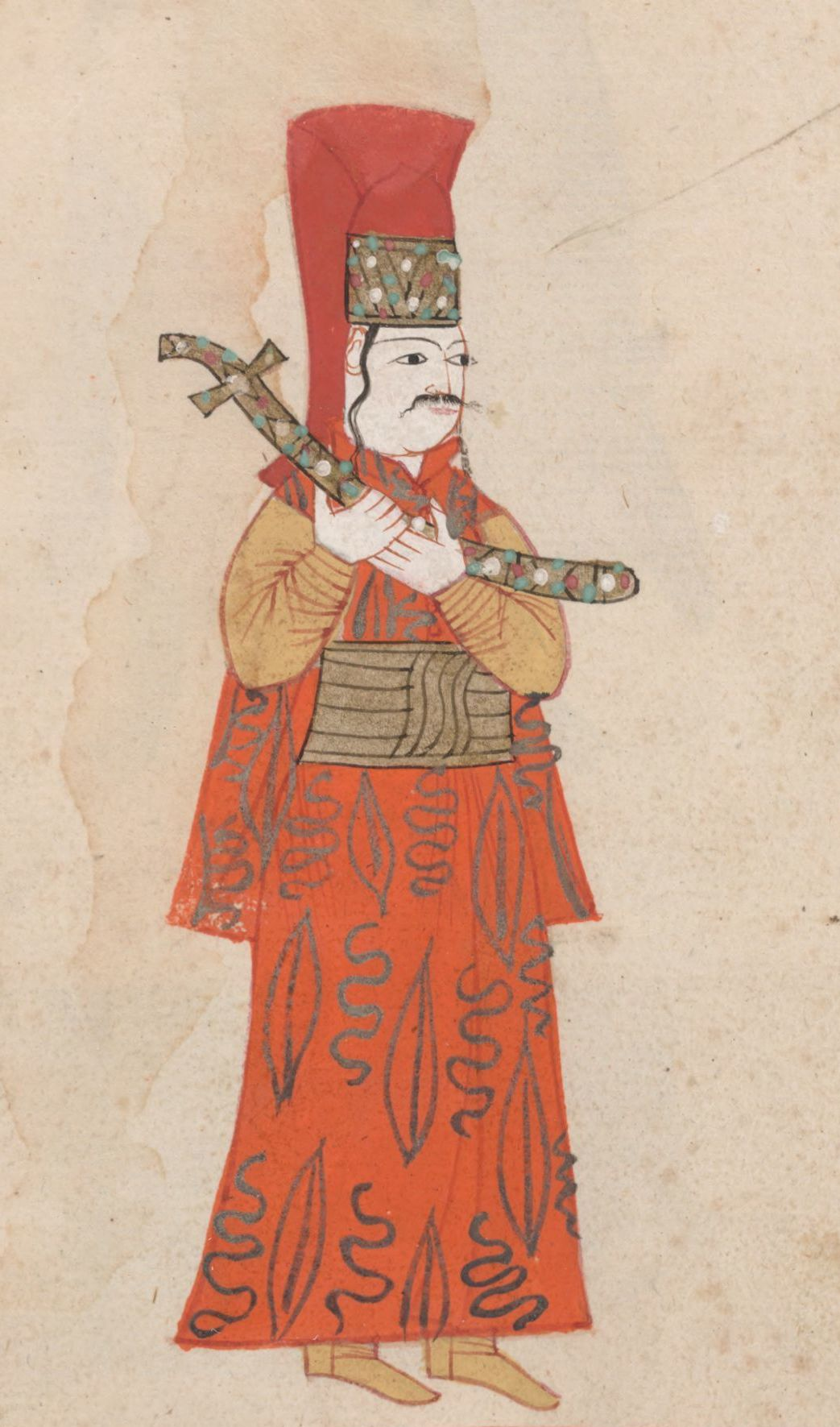
Depiction of the Silahdar Agha from the Rålamb Book of Costumes, 17th century

The Silahdar Agha was a palace office of the Ottoman Empire, denoting the principal page of the Ottoman Sultan. As such, holders of this office were persons of great influence, who rose to senior ranks and even became Grand Viziers.

The title derives from the Persian silahdar, meaning "arms-bearer", a title originally adopted by the Seljuks to denote one of the Sultan's principal aides, who bore his weapon and was responsible for the army's military arsenal. The title was a combination of two words Silahdar meaning "arms-bearer" and Agha, a honorific title. The Ottomans inherited this title and elevated it further: by the time of Mehmed II (r. 1451–1481) the Silahdar Agha was the second-in-command of the Sultan's Privy Chamber (Hass Oda) underneath the hass oda bashi. The Privy Chamber in turn was the senior of the four chambers making up the palace's Inner Service (Enderûn) under the Kapi Agha.

The Silahdar Agha's duties in the palace involved handling all communications to and from the Sultan, as well as assisting him in all public ceremonies or travels, where the Agha accompanied the sovereign carrying his sword. The Silahdar Agha was also in charge of a special bodyguard regiment, the silahdar bölüğü or sarı bayrak bölüğü ("Yellow Banner Division") after its distinctive yellow flag. The unit grew from 2,000 silahdars under Mehmed II to 2,780 in 1568, 2,930 in 1588, 5,000 in 1597, 6,244 in 1660, 7,683 in 1699, 10,821 in 1713, reaching 12,000 under Mahmud II (r. 1808–1839).

Due to their proximity to the Sultan, the holders of the post were highly influential, and many occupants moved on to senior positions in the Ottoman government, including the supreme post of Grand Vizier. Under the capable Çorlulu Ali Pasha, who held the post in the reign of Mustafa II (r. 1695–1703), it rose to such importance under that it assumed the last remaining powers of the once powerful Kapi Agha. The last holder of the office was Ali Pasha of Yanina, who died in 1822. Sultan Mahmud II thereupon abolished the post, merging it with the steward of the treasury (khazine kethüdası).

== Sources ==
- Bowen, H. (1960). "ʿAlī Pas̲h̲a Čorlulu". In Gibb, H. A. R.; Kramers, J. H.; Lévi-Provençal, E.; Schacht, J.; Lewis, B. & Pellat, Ch. (eds.). The Encyclopaedia of Islam, Second Edition. Volume I: A–B. Leiden: E. J. Brill. p. 394. doi:10.1163/1573-3912_islam_SIM_0530. OCLC 495469456.
- Har-El, Shai (1997). "Silāḥdār". In Bosworth, C. E.; van Donzel, E.; Heinrichs, W. P. & Lecomte, G. (eds.). The Encyclopaedia of Islam, Second Edition. Volume IX: San–Sze. Leiden: E. J. Brill. pp. 609–610. ISBN 978-90-04-10422-8.
- İnalcık, Halil (1978). "Ḳapu Ag̲h̲asi̊". In van Donzel, E.; Lewis, B.; Pellat, Ch. & Bosworth, C. E. (eds.). The Encyclopaedia of Islam, Second Edition. Volume IV: Iran–Kha. Leiden: E. J. Brill. pp. 570–571. ISBN 978-90-04-05745-6. OCLC 758278456.
