= Agha (title) =

Ottoman honorific title for civilian or military officers

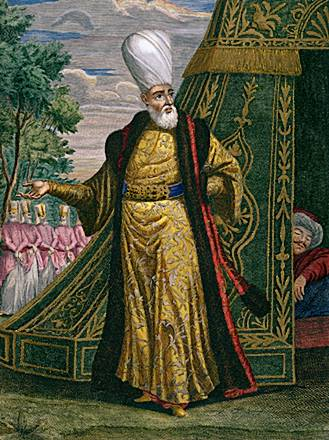
The Agha of the Janissaries

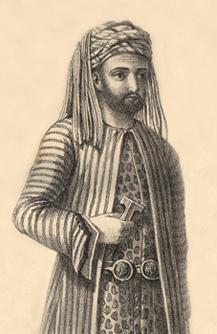
Omar Agha, officer for the Kurdish Pasha, Sheikh Mahmoud of Sulaymaniyah of Baban principality, Kurdistan, 1820

Agha (Turkish: ağa; Ottoman Turkish: آغا; Kurdish: ئەغا Persian: آقا, romanized: āghā; "chief, master, lord") is an honorific title for a civilian or officer, or often part of such title. In the Ottoman times, some court functionaries and leaders of organizations like the bazaar or the Janissary units were entitled to the agha title. In rural communities, this term is used for people who own considerable lands and are influential in their community. Outside of rural communities, this title is also used for any man who is influential or respected.

== Etymology ==
The word agha entered English from Turkish, and the Turkish word comes from the Old Turkic aqa, meaning "elder brother". It is an equivalent of the Mongolian word aqa or aka.

== Other uses ==
"Agha" is nowadays used as a common Persian honorific title for men, the equivalent of "mister" in English. The corresponding honorific term for women is khanum which is also of Turkic origin.

== Use as Jat Gotra ==
"Agha" is commonly used as surname in braj region in northern india. They commonly used it as their gotra. The warrior gotra "Haga/Agha" which means fierce strength.

Facial structure of Haga jats in India

== See also ==
- State organisation of the Ottoman Empire
- Agha Petros
- Agaluk
- Aga Khan
- Agha of the Janissaries
- Kapi Agha
- Kizlar Agha
- Silahdar Agha
- Ziad Agha
