= Öküz Mehmed Pasha Caravanserai =

Caravanserai in Kuşadası, Turkey

- Öküz Mehmet Paşa Kervansarayı
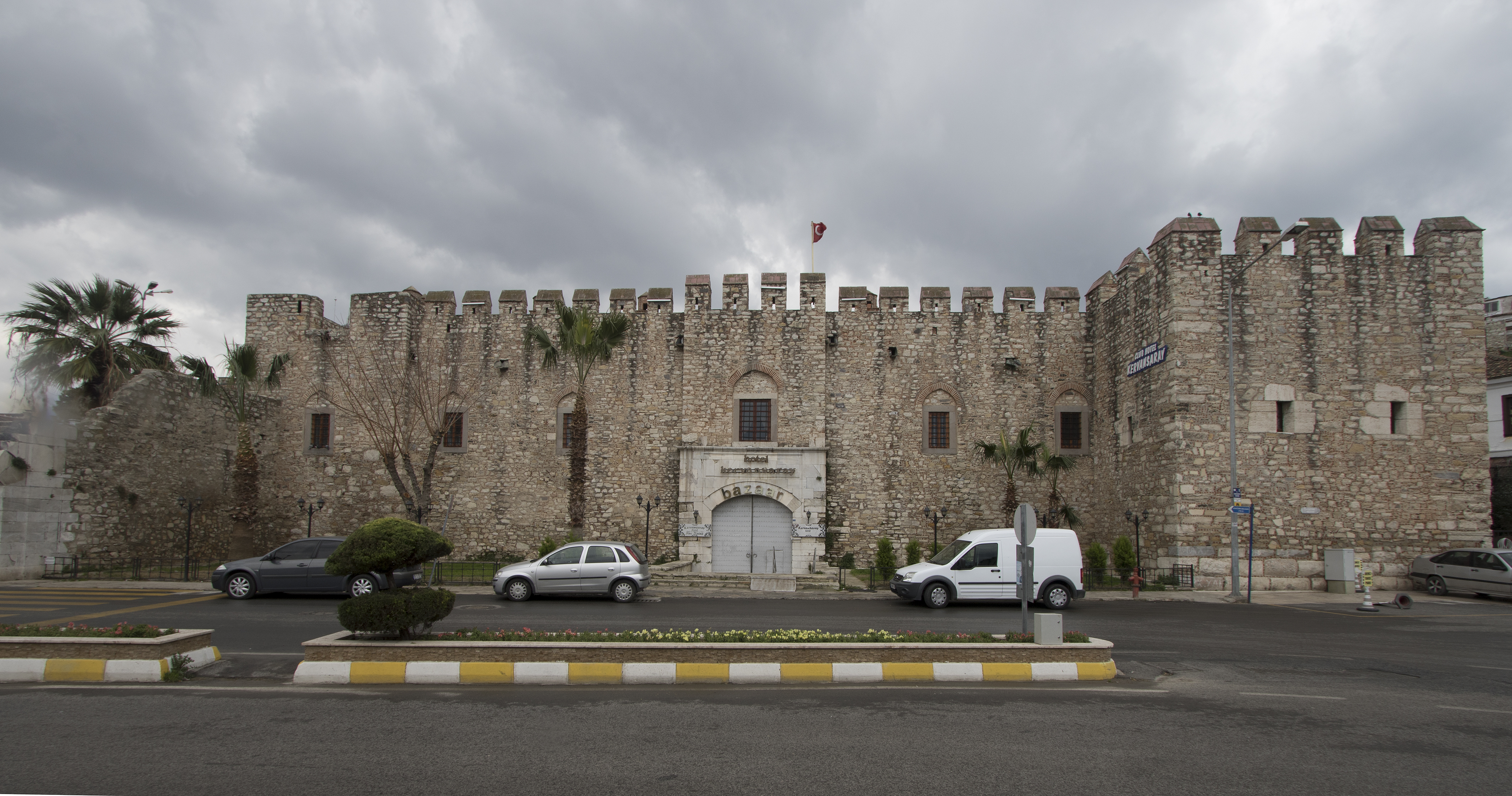
- A view of Öküz Mehmed Pasha Caravanserai in Kuşadası.
- Interactive map of the Öküz Mehmed Pasha Caravanserai area
- Former names: اکز محمد پاشا کاروانسرای

General information
- Type: Caravanserai
- Architectural style: Ottoman architecture
- Location: Kuşadası, Aydın Province, Turkey, Atatürk Bulvarı 2
- Coordinates: 37.86026°N 27.25662°E
- Construction started: 1615
- Completed: 1618
- Renovated: 1996
- Owner: Directorate of Foundations

Height
- Height: 10.60 m (34.8 ft) inside; 12.63 m (41.4 ft) outside

Dimensions
- Other dimensions: 43.63 m × 51.00 m (143.14 ft × 167.32 ft) outside; 28.50 m × 21.50 m (93.5 ft × 70.5 ft) inside

Technical details
- Floor count: 2

Design and construction
- Main contractor: "Öküz" Mehmed Pasha

The Öküz Mehmed Pasha Caravanserai (Turkish: Öküz Mehmet Paşa Kervansarayı; Ottoman Turkish: اوکز محمد پاشا کاروانسرای ALA-LC: Öküz Mehmet Pâşâ Kârvânserây) is a caravanserai located in Kuşadası, Aydın Province, western Turkey, built by Ottoman statesman and military commander "Öküz" Mehmed Pasha (died 1619). After its renovation, the building is used as a hotel today.

== History ==
The caravanserai was commissioned by Öküz Mehmed Pasha, who served as Governor of Ottoman Egypt and Grand Vizier. It was constructed between 1615 and 1618.

Constructed in the form of a fortress to meet the needs of the time, the caravanserai was used as customshouse.

The Directorate of Foundations started the renovation of the almost-ruined caravanserai in 1954 that continued until 1966. The cost of renovation totaled to ₺2.1 million (approx. US$0.21 million), not including the cost for nationalization of shanties on three sides of the ruined structure.

== Architecture ==
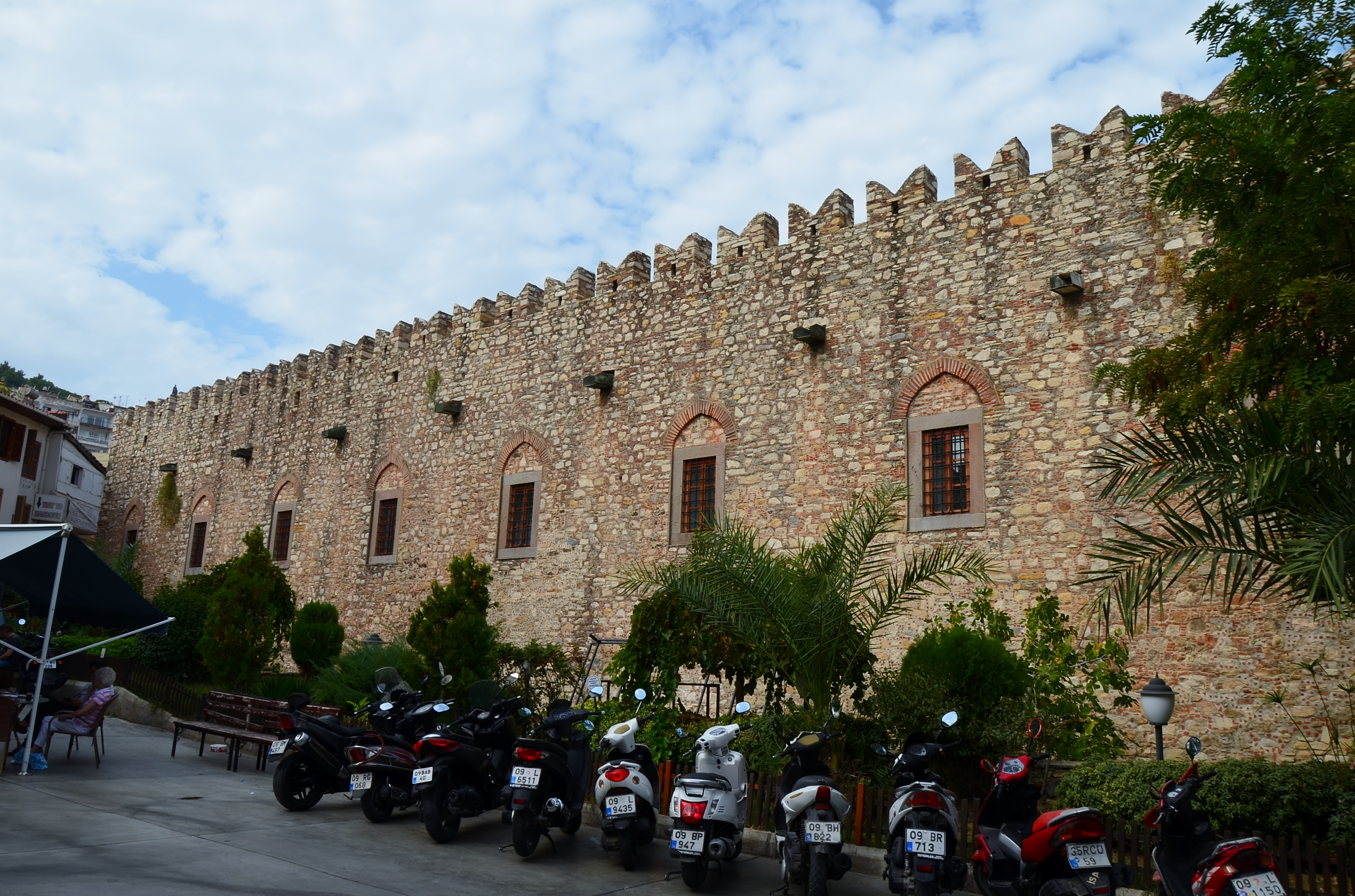
Outer wall of the caravanserai.

The caravanserai is a two-story building with thick walls around a rectangular courtyard of 28.50 m × 21.50 m (93.5 ft × 70.5 ft). The building's outside dimensions are 43.63 m × 51.00 m (143.14 ft × 167.32 ft). It is built in rubble masonry and with gathered stones. It is known that the rooms were originally built with bricks of size 24 cm × 36 cm (9.4 in × 14.2 in). Having the form of a small citadel, its exterior walls end up in battlement with merlons. The marble-covered arched main entrance is situated in the north facing the sea. Two niches on two sides inside the entrance help enlarge it. The other entrance, also covered by marble and styled as the main entrance in almost the same size, opens to the east directly into the town's marketplace.

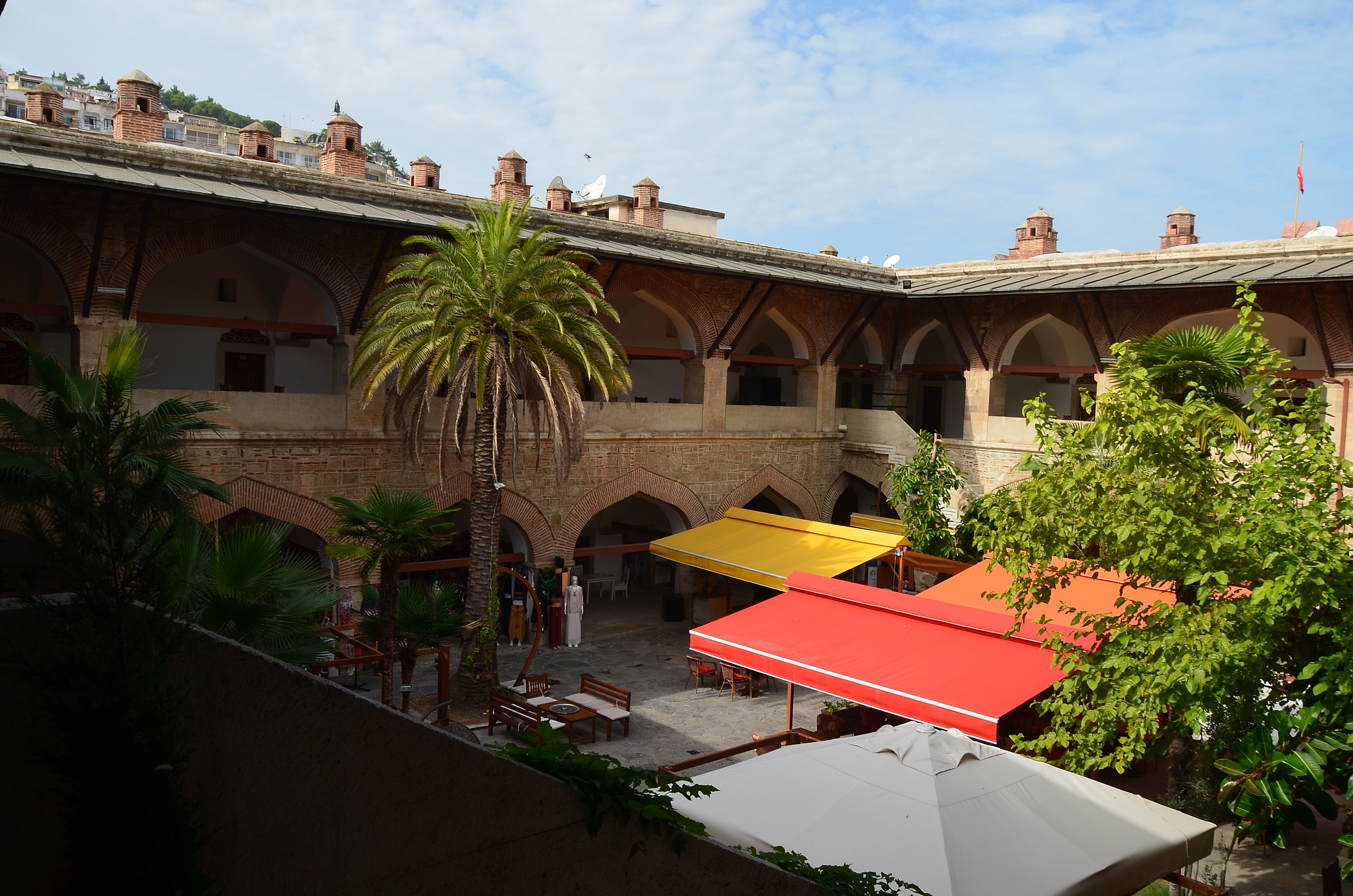
Courtyard of the caravanserai, which is used as an open-air café.

The large courtyard is surrounded by rooms behind arched stoa. The corner rooms are reached by a diagonal passage. There are 28 rooms on ground floor, which have a window next to their door under the stoa facing the courtyard. Entrance to the room is over a step. The fireplace in the room, situated in the wall separating the rooms, is flanked by two small closets.

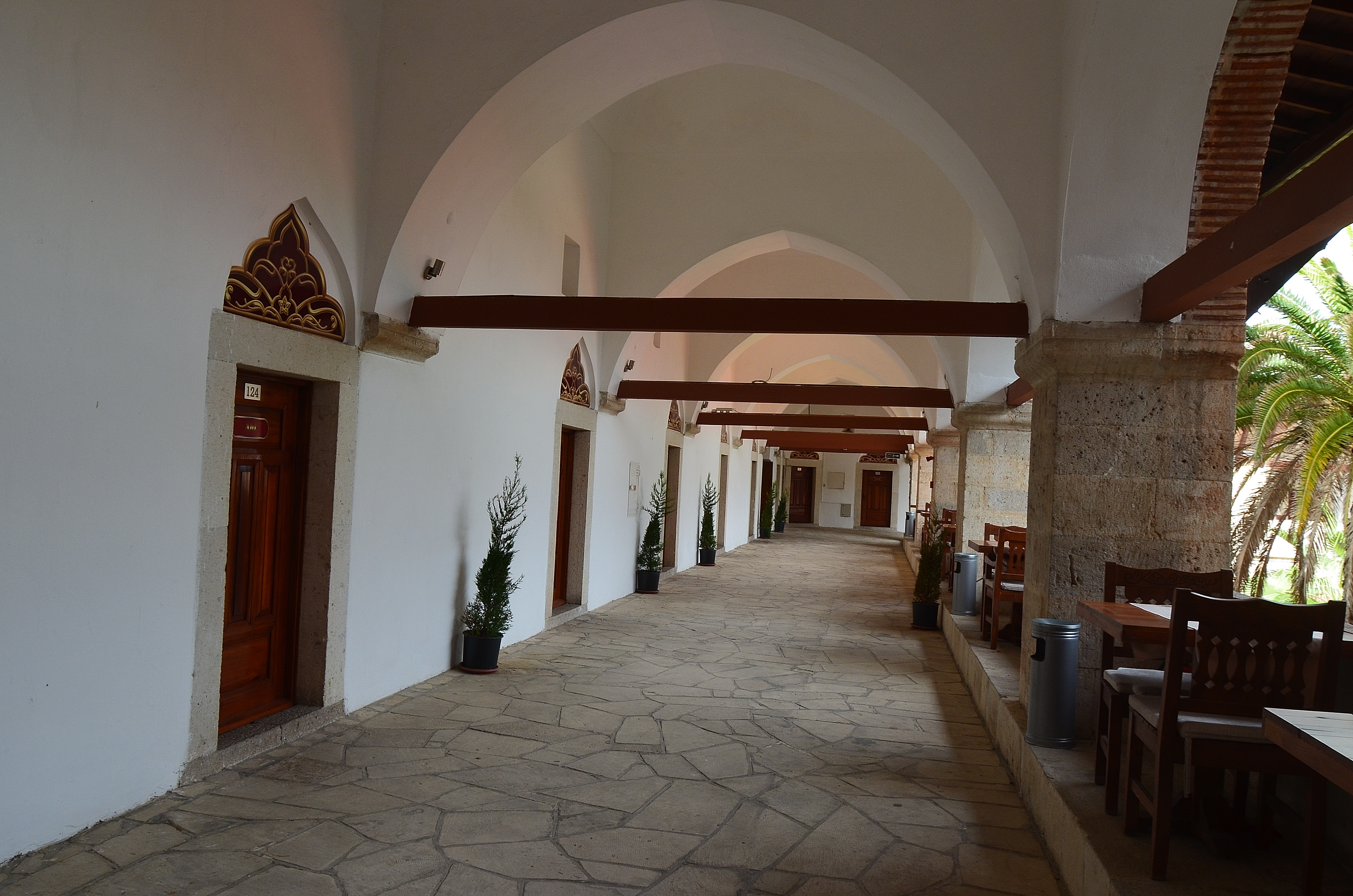
Balcony at first floor with rooms.

There are two stairways in the northwestern and southeastern corners leading from the courtyard to the first floor, constructed one over a half and the other over a full arch. The stairway right of the main entrance has 19 steps while the stairway left of the marketplace entrance has 21 steps.

The rooms on the first floor are reached over the balcony with one step at the door. The rooms have each one window looking outside the caravanserai. Planks run the entire building to serve as lintel for the doors and windows. The fireplace is situated in the wall facing the courtyard because the room-separating walls at this level incorporate the chimneys of the fireplace of the rooms at the ground floor. On the left side of the fireplace, a closet is present. The room over the main entrance with niches is larger than the others, and it has also a bigger window than the others. A narrow stairway hidden in the wall inside the right side niche goes up to the terrace. According to historical records, this room was reserved for the commissioner of customs.

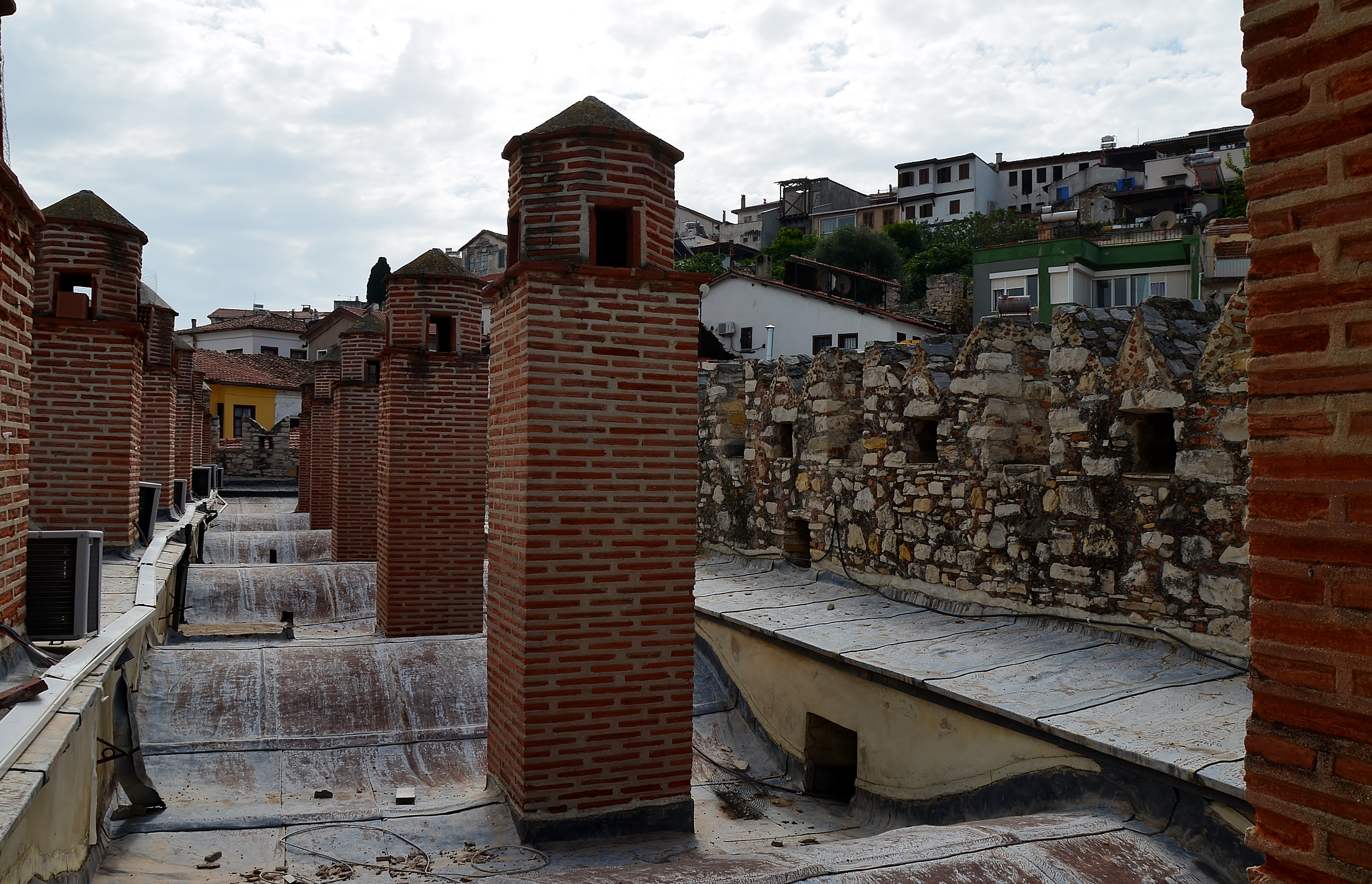
Roof of the caravanserai with chimneys (left and mid) and the battlement (right).

On the roof, there is a 90 cm (3.0 ft) wide aisle behind the battlement. The merlons were designed suitable for pouring hot oil onto the enemy. To the northwest and northeast corners of the caravanserai, great importance is attached in regard of an attack coming from the sea. The merlons on the northeast corner are higher giving it an impression of a watchtower. The entablature is 10.60 m (34.8 ft) high at the inside of the structure while the building's height on the outside is 12.63 m (41.4 ft).

The caravanserai was restored several times in the history, the latest being in 1996. Today, it is in a good condition.

== Hotel ==
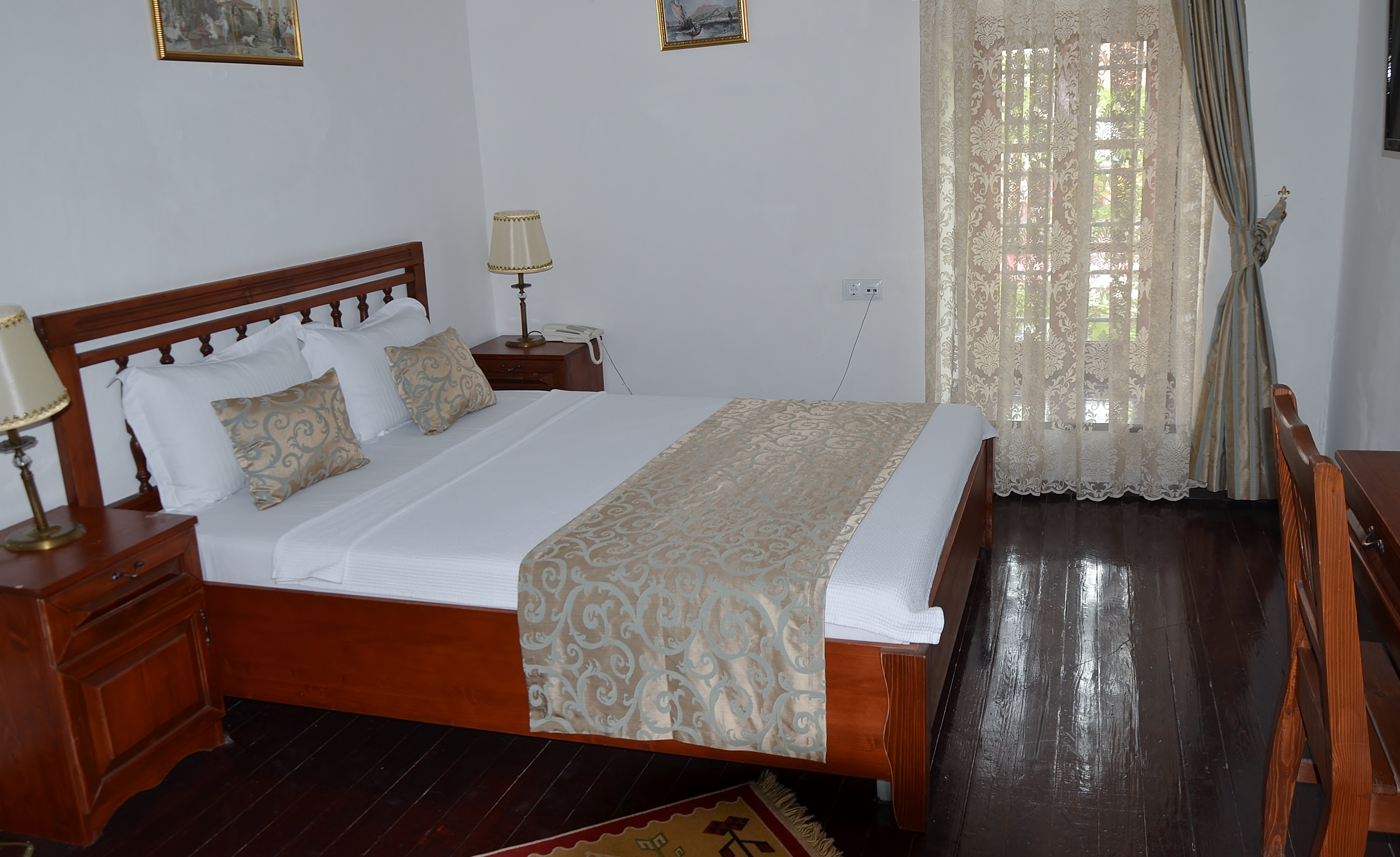
A hotel room inside the caravanserai.

In 1968, the renovated caravanserai opened as a hotel of the French Club Med. Since 1978, the Öküz Mehmed Pasha Caravaserai is run by Club Caravanserail.

The hotel features 55 beds in 25 rooms and a suit room. The open-air restaurant is capable of 350 guests.

US President Jimmy Carter was among the notable guests, who resided in the hotel during their visits to the nearby historic site Ephesus. The site is remembered also as the place, where the Greek Minister of Foreign Affairs George Papandreou and his Turkish counterpart Ismail Cem met to improve bilateral relations between the two countries.
