= Necatibey Faculty of Education =

Necatibey Faculty of Education (Turkish: Necatibey Eğitim Fakültesi) is an institution for teacher education of the Balıkesir University, Turkey.

== History ==
The school opened as Karesi Dârü'l Muallîmin in 1910. After serving in different buildings; In April 1932, a new generation, designed and built as a teacher school, was moved as a school and the name of the school was named Necati Bey Teacher School in commemoration of Mustafa Necati Bey, one of the former National Education Ministers of the Republic of Turkey.

In 1944–1945, as a Necati Education Institute, it was transformed into a two-year higher education institution in order to train secondary education teachers. In 1968–1969, it was changed to three-year and in the 1978–1979 academic year, it was changed to four-year undergraduate degree status.

The institution has participated in the Higher Teachers' Schools institution in 1980–1981. On July 20, 1982, the institution that joined the Uludağ University under the name of Necatibey Education Faculty, continues to serve under the roof of Balıkesir University with the establishment of Balıkesir University in 1992. There are physics, chemistry, biology, science and computer laboratories in the faculty. In addition, there are outdoor parking lot, carpet field, basketball court and tennis courts within the faculty campus. There is also a School of Physical Education and Sports in the faculty area. As the only faculty to stay in the central settlement of the faculty of the province center, it carries out activities for raising qualified teachers in Turkish National Education. During the 2010–2011 school year, the facade was modernized as well as the laboratories and classrooms in all the faculties of the faculty. The Department of Turkish Language and Literature Education, one of the faculty departments, takes students from the top 1% of those who enter the Higher Education Foundations Examination.
