= List of Janissary Aghas =

This is a list of the Aghas of the Janissaries, the commanders of the Janissary corps from the early 16th century to the early 19th century.

== List ==
Name	Tenure as Agha	Fate	Refs
Yakub Agha	1515	unknown	
Ferhad Agha	1515–1517	Promoted to beylerbey (governor-general) of Rumelia and vizier	
Ayas Mehmed Agha	1517–1519(?)	Promoted to beylerbey of Rumelia, eventually served as grand vizier (1536–1539)	
Kemal or Kemaleddin Agha	1519	Died in office	
Behrem Agha	1519–1520	Promoted to beylerbey of Rumelia	
Bali Agha	1521–1523	Executed	
Mustafa Agha	1523(?)–1525	Executed	
Şücaadin Agha	1525–1526	Died in office	
Ismail Agha	1526(?)	Promoted to beylerbey	
Mehmed Agha	1526(?)–1531	Promoted to beylerbey of Rumelia	
Güzelce Rüstem Agha	1531–1533/4	Promoted to beylerbey of Budin	
Silahdar Cafer Agha	1533/4–1534	Promoted to beylerbey of Damascus	
Mehmed Agha	1534	Promoted to beylerbey of Aleppo	
Kara Ahmed Agha	1534–1541	Promoted to beylerbey of Rumelia, eventually served as grand vizier (1553–1555)	
Temerrüd Ali Agha	1541	Promoted to beylerbey of Erzurum	
Ferhad Agha	1541–1546/7	unknown	
Semiz Ali Agha	1546/7–1549	Promoted to beylerbey of Rumelia, eventually served as grand vizier (1561–1565)	
Sinan Agha	1549–1553	unknown	
Iskender Agha	1553(?)–1554(?)	Possibly promoted to beylerbey of Egypt	
Pertev Mehmed Agha	1554	unknown	
Damad Ferhad Agha	1554–1558	Promoted to beylerbey of Kastamonu	
Şemiz Ahmed Agha	1558–1561	Promoted to beylerbey of Rumelia, eventually served as grand vizier (1579–1580)	
Hasan Agha	1561–1563	Promoted to beylerbey of Rumelia	
Müezzinzade Ali Agha	1563–1566	Promoted to Kapudan Pasha	
Cafer Agha	1566–1569	Promoted to governor of Kütahya	
Siyavuş Agha	1569–1570	Promoted to beylerbey of Rumelia, eventually served thrice as grand vizier (1582–1584, 1586–1589, 1592–1593)	
Mustafa Agha	1570–1575	Died in office	
Cafer Agha	1566–1569	Promoted to governor of Kütahya	
Cığalazade Yusuf Sinan Agha	1575–1579	Promoted to governor of Erzurum, eventually served as grand vizier (1596)	
Cerrah Mehmed Agha	1579	Promoted to vizier and beylerbey of Rumelia, eventually served as grand vizier (1598–1599)	
Damad Ibrahim Agha	1579–1582	Promoted to beylerbey of Rumelia, eventually served thrice as grand vizier (1596, 1596–1597, 1599–1601)	
Serdar Ferhad Pasha	1582	Promoted to vizier and beylerbey of Rumelia, eventually served twice as grand vizier (1591–1592, 1595)	
Payzen Frenk Yusuf Agha	1582(?)–1584	Promoted to beylerbey of Budin	
Mehmed Agha	1584	Promoted to beylerbey of Rumelia	
Ayas Pashazade Mustafa Agha	1585	Promoted to beylerbey of Marash	
Maraşlı Kara Mehmed Agha	1585	Promoted to vizier and beylerbey of Rumelia	
Hürrem Agha	1585{?)–1587	unknown	
Halil Agha	1587–1588	Promoted to beylerbey of Rumelia	
Halil Agha	1588–1589	Promoted to beylerbey of Rumelia	
Hızır Agha	1589	Promoted to beylerbey of Rumelia	
Apostol Mahmud Agha	1589–1590	Promoted to beylerbey of Rumelia	
Saatçi Hasan Agha	1590–1591	Promoted to beylerbey and kaymakam	
Satırçı Mehmed Agha	1591–1592	Promoted to beylerbey of Karaman, eventually served as grand vizier (1604–1606)	
Bosnali Halil Agha	1592	unknown	
Mahmud Agha	1592–1594	unknown	
Yemişçi Hasan Agha	1594–1595	1st tenure. Promoted to vizier and beylerbey of Shirvan	
Harami Ahmed Agha	1595	Promoted to beylerbey of Bosnia	
Güzelce Mahmud Agha	1595	Promoted to beylerbey of Kars and kaymakam	
Yemişçi Hasan Agha	1595–1596	2nd tenure. Promoted to commander of Yerevan, eventually served as grand vizier (1601–1603)	
Veli Agha	1596	Promoted to beylerbey of Rumelia	
Sarıkçı Mustafa Agha	1596	Promoted to beylerbey of Van	
Tırnakçı Hasan Agha	1596–1601	Promoted to vizier and governor of Baghdad	
Ali Agha	1601–1603	Dismissed	
Deli Ferhad Agha	1603	Promoted to beylerbey of Damascus	
Kasim Agha	1603	Promoted to vizier and kaymakam	
Türk Koca Ahmed Agha	1603–1604	Promoted to Kapudan Pasha	
Nakkaş Hasan Agha	1604	Promoted to vizier and beylerbey of Rumelia	
Silahdar Hüseyin Agha	1604–1606	Promoted to beylerbey of Aleppo	
Maryol Hüseyin Agha	1606–1607	Promoted to beylerbey of Anatolia	
Halil Agha	1607–1609	Promoted to Kapudan Pasha, eventually served as grand vizier (1616–1619)	
Imrahor Ibrahim Agha	1611(?)–1612	Promoted to beylerbey of Yemen	
Miralem Ismail Agha	1612–1613(?)	Dismissed	
Çukadar Ahmed Agha	1613	Promoted to beylerbey of Rumelia	
Mustafa Agha	1613	Promoted to beylerbey of Egypt	
Ahmed Agha	1613–1615		
Mustafa Agha	1615–1616	Died in office	
Sari Hüseyin Agha	1616	Promoted to beylerbey of Damascus	
Ohrili Hüseyin Agha	1616	Promoted to beylerbey of Rumelia	
Nişancı Ahmed Agha	1616	Promoted to beylerbey of Egypt	
Ali Agha	1616	Promoted to beylerbey of Bosnia	
Hocazade Damadi Mustafa Agha	1616–1618	Promoted to beylerbey of Diyarbekir	
Mirahor Ispartali Mustafa Agha	1618–1619	Promoted to beylerbey of Egypt	
Bibershami Silahdar Yusuf Agha	1619–1620	Promoted to beylerbey of Aleppo	
Niğdeli Softa Mustafa Agha	1620–1621	Promoted to Kapudan Pasha	
Deveci Ali Agha	1621–1622	unknown	
Kara Ali Agha	1622	Murdered by Janissaries	
Deli Derviş Agha	1622	Promoted to beylerbey of Rumelia	
Berber Kara Mustafa Agha	1622	Promoted to vizier and beylerbey of Egypt	
Çeşteli Ali Agha	1622–1623	Promoted to beylerbey of Egypt	
Bayram Agha	1623	Promoted to vizier and beylerbey of Egypt, eventually served as grand vizier (1637–1638)	
Hüsrev Agha	1623–1626	Promoted to vizier and beylerbey of Diyarbekir, eventually served as grand vizier (1628–1631)	
Ali Agha	1626–1627	Died in office	
Demirkazık Halil Agha	1627–1628	Promoted to governor of Sivas	
Mostarlı Mustafa Agha	1628–1630	Promoted to beylerbey of Damascus	
Hacı Eyvad Süleyman Agha	1630–1631	Promoted to vizier and governor of Erzurum	
Hasan Halife Agha	1631–1632	Murdered	
Köse Mehmed Agha	1632–1634	Executed	
Mehmed Agha	1634–1635	Promoted to governor of Karaman	
Kemankeş Kara Mustafa Agha	1635	Promoted to Kapudan Pasha, eventually served as grand vizier (1638–1644)	
Şahin Agha	1635–1638	Promoted to defterdar	
Küçük Hasan Agha	1638	Promoted to governor of Baghdad	
Rikabdar Bıyıklı Mustafa Agha	1638–1640	Promoted to beylerbey of Rumelia	
Silahdar Siyavuş Agha	1640	Promoted to Kapudan Pasha	
Tekeli/Antalyali Mustafa Agha	1640(?)–1642	Promoted to governor of Erzurum	
Bektaş Agha	1642–1643	Promoted to governor of Bursa	
Hezargradi Voynuk Ahmed Agha	1643–1644	Promoted to beylerbey of Bosnia	
Mirahor Salih Agha	1644	Promoted to vizier and chief defterdar, eventually served as grand vizier (1645–1647)	
Rikabdar Şaban Agha/Pasha	1644–1645	Promoted to beylerbey of Marash	
Musa Agha/Pasha	1645	Promoted to chief defterdar and Kapudan Pasha, eventually served as grand vizier (1647)	
Pirinçcizade Ahmed Agha/Pasha	1645–1646	Promoted to governor of Biga	
Debbağ Mehmed Agha	1646–1647	Promoted to beylerbey of Aleppo	
Hamamcı Mehmed Agha	1647	Promoted to vizier	
Hamzapaşazade Mehmed Agha/Pasha	1647	Promoted to vizier	
Seyyid Emir Mehmed Efendi	1647	Promoted to beylerbey of Egypt	
Küçük Çavuş Ahmed Agha	1647–1648	Exiled to Kütahya	
Bostancıbaşı Ceyazirli Musa Agha	1648	Died in office	
Emir Seleci Şerif Mustafa Agha	1648	Promoted to governor of Bolu and chief defterdar	
Karagöz Mehmed Agha	1648–1649	Promoted to beylerbey of Egypt and defterdar	
Kara Dev Murad Agha	1649	Promoted to Kapudan Pasha	
Şahin Agha	1649–1651	Executed	
Karahasan Aghazade Hüseyin Agha	1651	Promoted to governor of Kastamonu	
Malatyali Rikabdar Süyman Agha	1651–1653	Promoted to governor of Malatya, eventually served as grand vizier (1655–1656)	
Gürcü Mustafa Agha/Pasha	1653	Promoted to governor of Kanije	
Kenan Agha/Pasha	1653–1655	Promoted to vizier and governor of Kanije	
Mirahor Mehmed Agha	1655–1656	Dismissed	
Ases Damadı Mehmed Agha	1656	Executed	
Çukadar Boşnak Mahmud Agha	1656	Executed	
Çetrefilzade Gürcü Hüseyin Agha/Pasha	1656	Promoted to vizier and beylerbey of Diyarbakir	
Sührap Mehmed Agha/Pasha	1656–1657	Promoted to vizier and governor of Sivas	
Hoca Ali Agha	1657–1658	Executed	
Kundakçizade Kanbur Mustafa Agha	1658–1662	Promoted to vizier and beylerbey of Damascus	
Salih Agha	1662–1664	Promoted to beylerbey of Damascus	
Mustafa Agha	1664	Died in office while on campaign	
Muharrem Agha	1664	Promoted to beylerbey of Anatolia	
Çavuşbaşı ŞiŞman Ibrahim Agha	1664–1665	Promoted to governor of Belgrade	
Arnavuduzun Ibrahim Agha/Pasha	1665–1669	Promoted to kaymakam	
Abdi Agha/Pasha	1669	Promoted to vizier	
Abdurrahman Agha/Pasha	1669(?)–1674	Promoted to vizier and governor of Baghdad	
Kara Hasanzade Mustafa Agha	1674–1678	Promoted to kaymakam	
Çelebi Ibrahim Agha/Pasha	1678–1679	Promoted to vizier and governor of Erzurum	
Tekdurfağlı Beki Mustafa Agha/Pasha	1679–1683	1st tenure. Promoted to vizier	
Hadji Zülfikar Agha/Pasha	1683–1686	Promoted to dizdar (fortress commandant) of Chios	
Çolak Hasan Agha	1686	Retired	
Beki Mustafa Pasha	1686–1687	2nd tenure. Promoted to dizdar of Boğaz Hisar fortress, eventually served as grand vizier (1688–1689)	
Cadi Yusuf Agha	1687	Promoted to governor of Cidde	
Cerrah Mustafa Agha	1687–1688	Promoted to dizdar of Sedd el Bahr fortress	
Harputlu Hadji Ali Agha	1688	Executed	
Darbakçı Ali agha	1688	Executed	
Müezzinzade Hasan Agha/Pasha	1688	Promoted to vizier	
Koca Mahmud Agha/Pasha	1688–1689	Promoted to vizier	
Ebubekir Agha/Pasha	1689–1690	Promoted to governor of Niğbolu	
Arabacı Kadi Ali Agha	1690–1691	Promoted to vizier and kaymakam, eventually served as grand vizier (1691–1692)	
Çikoğlu Mehmed Agha	1691	Died in office	
Eğinli Mehmed Agha	1691	Executed	
Daltaban Mustafa Agha	1691–1692	Promoted to dizdar of Özi fortress, eventually served as grand vizier (1702–1703)	
Çelebi Ismail Agha/Pasha	1692–1693	Promoted to beylerbey of Damascus	
Gürcü Elhac Abdullah Agha	1693–1694	Promoted to dizdar of Belgrade fortress	
Murad Agha/Pasha	1694–1695	Promoted to governor of Izmit	
Çelebi Arec Yusuf Agha/Pasha	1695	Promoted to governor of Özi	
Deli Baltazade Mahmud Agha	1695–1697	Died in office	
Çelebi Ibrahim Agha/Pasha	1697–1698	Promoted to dizdar of Boğaz Hisar fortress	
Kürd Ibrahim Agha	1698–1701	Promoted to governor of Mosul	
Doğramacızade Mehmed Agha	1701–1703	Promoted to vizier and governor of Chania	
Dellak Ali Agha	1703	Promoted to dizdar of Belgrade fortress	
Arnavud Osman Agha	1703	Promoted to beylerbey of Damascus	
Elhac Çalik Ahmed Agha	1703	Executed	
Çelebi Mehmed Agha	1703–1704	1st tenure	
Boşnak Hasan Agha	1704	Promoted to governor of Hüdavendigâr (Bursa)	
Tortumlu Ibrahim Agha	1704–1705	Retired	
Çelebi Mehmed Agha	1705–1706	2nd tenure. Promoted to kaymakam and vizier	
Arnavud Osman Agha/Pasha	1706–1707	Died	
Balli Mehmed Agha	1707–1708	Promoted to governor of Niğbolu	
Koca Kara Mustafa Agha	1708–1710	1st tenure. Banished to Gelibolu	
Gürcü Yusuf Agha/Pasha	1710–1711	Promoted to grand vizier (1711–1712)	
Çelebi Mehmed Agha/Pasha	1711–1712	3rd tenure. Promoted to kaymakam	
Koca Kara Mustafa Agha	1712–1713	2nd tenure. Banished to Malkara	
Arnavud Haci Deli Ebubekir Agha	1713	Promoted to vizier and governor of Kyustendil	
Kürd Hasan Agha	1713–1715	Promoted to vizier and governor of Chania	
Darbune Ebubekir Agha	1715–1716	Promoted to beylerbey of Erzurum	
Bayraktar Zileli Hüseyin Agha/Pasha	1716–1717	Banished to Bihke	
Ermeni Mehmed Agha	1717–1718	1st tenure. Banished to Tekfurdağı	
Muhsinzade Abdullah Agha/Pasha	1718–1719	Promoted to defterdar and beylerbey of the Morea	
Findikzade Ahmed Agha	1719	Banished to Tekfurdağı	
Ermeni Mehmed Agha	1719–1724	Died	
Kethüda Hasan Agha	1724–1730	Banished to Rhodes	
Sarrac Kel Mehmed Agha	1730	Dismissed	
Muhsinzade Abdullah Agha/Pasha	1730–1731	Promoted to governor of Adana, eventually served as grand vizier (1737)	
Şahin Mehmed Agha/Pasha	1731	Promoted to kaymakam and Kapudan Pasha	
Köle Gürcü Ismail Agha/Pasha	1731–1732	Promoted to beylerbey of Rumelia	
Çelebi Kethüdabeyzade Abdülbaki Agha	1732–1733	Banished to Gelibolu	
Altinci Mustafa Agha	1733–1734	Dismissed	
Abdullah Agha/Pasha	1734–1738	Died	
Deli Seyyid Hasan Agha/Pasha	1738–1743	Promoted to grand vizier (1743–1746)	
Erzurumi Yazıcızade Elhac Ibrahim Agha	1743–1745	Promoted to vizier and governor of Erzurum	
Malatyalı Ibrahim Agha/Pasha	1745–1747	Promoted to governor of Aydın	
Kelleci Mustafa Agha	1747–1748	1st tenure. Banished to Gelibolu	
Hüseyin Agha	1748	Banished to Bursa	
Hacı Hasan Agha	1748–1750	Promoted to governor of Khotyn	
Kelleci Mustafa Agha	1750	2nd tenure. Banished to Gelibolu	
Deli Emir Seyyid Ahmed Agha	1750	Promoted to vizier and governor of Sidon	
Darbunezade Seyyid Numan Agha	1750–1751	Banished to Erzurum	
Macar Hacı Hasan Agha	1751–1752	Banished to Lemnos, eventually Kapudan Pasha	
Sari Mustafa Agha	1752–1755	Promoted to kaymakam	
Ahıskalı Mehmed Agha	1755	Banished to Manisa	
Dibacızade Ibrahim Agha/Pasha	1755–1757	Promoted to kaymakam of the grand vizier	
Kalafat Mehmed Pasha	1770		
Yeğen Mehmed Pasha	1772–1774		
İbrahim Hilmi Pasha	1804–1806		

In June 1826, the "Janissary Corps" was abolished by the will of Sultan Mahmud II and destroyed with the events of Vaka-i Hayriye, and a new army organization called Asakir-i Mansure-i Muhammediye began to be established.

== Sources ==
- Yıldız, Aysel (2018). "Commanders of the Janissary Army: The Janissary Ağas, Their Career and Promotion Patterns". In Georgios Theotokis; Aysel Yıldız (eds.). A Military History of the Mediterranean Sea: Aspects of War, Diplomacy, and Military Elites. Leiden and Boston: Brill. pp. 397–462. ISBN 978-90-04-31509-9.
