= Enderûn =

Interior Service of the Ottoman Imperial Court

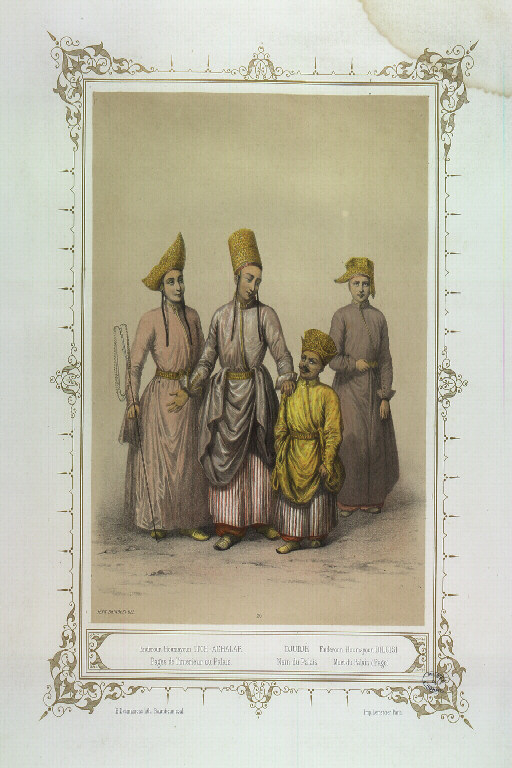
Pages of the Enderûn (Inner Service) with a court dwarf and a deaf-mute (dilsiz)

Enderûn (Ottoman Turkish: اندرون, from Persian andarûn, lit. 'inside') was the term used in the Ottoman Empire to designate the "Inner Service" of the imperial court, concerned with the private service of the Ottoman sultans, as opposed to the state-administrative "Outer Service" (Birûn). Its name derives from the location of the sultan's apartments in the inner court of the Topkapi Palace, which in turn echoed the arrangements of the palace in Edirne, the Ottomans' second capital.

The Inner Service was divided into departments (termed oda, 'chamber'). Four were dedicated to the Sultan's personal service. In descending order of importance, these were the Privy Chamber (hass oda), the Treasury (hazine), the Privy Larder (kilar-ı hass), and the Campaign Chamber (seferli oda). The head of the Inner Service—and until the rise of the Kizlar Agha the most powerful person in the palace after the Sultan—was the Kapi Agha or chief white eunuch. After the Kapi Agha came a number of senior officers or aghas: the head of the Privy Chamber (hass oda başı), who on account of his permanent proximity to the Sultan was a very influential individual; the Sultan's stirrup-holder (rikabdar); the keeper of the Sultan's outer garments (çuhadar); the keeper of the Sultan's linen undergarments (dülbend oghlanı); and the Sultan's confidential secretary (sır katibi).

The Kapi Agha was also the head of the forty white eunuchs or White Aghas (ak aghas) whose responsibility was to run the palace school, where princes were trained along with selected young Christian boys, gathered through the devşirme system—from the 17th century, however, Muslim boys were also admitted. These boys received a thorough education and were destined for the highest state offices, beginning their career as pages in the Inner Service, and were known as içoğlanı ('lads of the interior'). The most able of these pages entered the service of the Great and Little Chambers (büyük/küçük oda) which were, and after four years the best were sent to one of the four chambers dedicated to the Sultan's personal service, the remainder finding their way to the elite Kapıkulu cavalry divisions.

The Inner Service was notable for its employment of deaf-mutes (dilsiz), at least from the time of Mehmed II, to the end of the empire. They acted as guards and attendants, and due to their particular nature were often entrusted with highly confidential assignments, including executions. Their number varied but they were never numerous; they had their own uniforms, their own superiors (başdilsiz), and although many were literate, they also communicated in their own special sign language.

== Sources ==
- Imber, Colin (2002). The Ottoman Empire, 1300–1650: The Structure of Power (First ed.). Basingstoke: Palgrave Macmillan. ISBN 978-0-3336-1386-3.
- İnalcık, Halil (2000) [1973]. The Ottoman Empire: The Classical Age, 1300-1600. London: Phoenix Press. ISBN 978-1-8421-2442-0.
- Lewis, B.; Ménage, V. L.; Pellat, Ch. & Schacht, J., eds. (1971). "Ič-Og̲h̲lani̊". The Encyclopaedia of Islam, Second Edition. Volume III: H–Iram. Leiden: E. J. Brill. p. 1006. OCLC 495469525.
- Lewis, Bernard (1965). "Di̇lsi̇z". In Lewis, B.; Pellat, Ch. & Schacht, J. (eds.). The Encyclopaedia of Islam, Second Edition. Volume II: C–G. Leiden: E. J. Brill. p. 277. OCLC 495469475.
- Parry, V. J. (1965). "Enderūn". In Lewis, B.; Pellat, Ch. & Schacht, J. (eds.). The Encyclopaedia of Islam, Second Edition. Volume II: C–G. Leiden: E. J. Brill. pp. 697–698. OCLC 495469475.
