= Halil İnalcık =

Turkish historian (1916–2016)

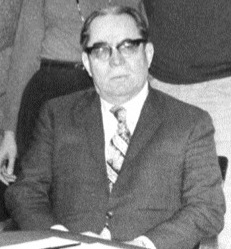
- Halil İnalcık at the Ottoman documents and the Black Sea region colloquium in March 1981.
- Born: 7 September 1916; Istanbul, Ottoman Empire
- Died: 25 July 2016 (aged 99); Ankara, Turkey
- Resting place: Fatih Mosque, Istanbul
- Education: Ankara University; SOAS, University of London
- Scientific career
- Fields: Ottoman history
- Workplaces: Ankara University; University of Chicago; Bilkent University
- Thesis: The Tanzimat and the Bulgarian Question (1943)
- Doctoral advisor: Bekir Sıtkı Baykal

Halil İnalcık (7 September 1916 (Note: According to his CV on his website, he was born on 7 September 1916. However, other sources have given 26 May 1916 as a possible date of birth.) – 25 July 2016) was a Turkish historian. His influential research centered on social and economic approaches to the Ottoman Empire. His academic career started at Ankara University, where he completed his PhD and worked between 1940 and 1972. Between 1972 and 1986, he taught Ottoman history at the University of Chicago. From 1994 onward, he taught at Bilkent University, where he founded the history department. He was a founding member of the Eurasian Academy.

== Biography ==
He was born in Istanbul on 7 September 1916 to a Crimean Tatar family that left Crimea for the city in 1905. He attended Balıkesir Teacher Training School, and then Ankara University, Faculty of Language, History and Geography, Department of History, from which he graduated in 1940. His work on Timur drew the attention of Mehmet Fuat Köprülü, who facilitated his entry as an assistant to the Modern Age Department of the university. He completed his PhD in 1942 in the same department. His PhD thesis was on the Bulgarian question in the late Ottoman Empire, specifically during tanzimat, and constituted one of the first socioeconomic approaches in Turkish historiography. In December 1943, he became assistant professor and his research interest became focused on the social and economic aspects of the Ottoman Empire. He worked on the Ottoman judicial records of Bursa and in the Ottoman archives in Istanbul. He became a member of the Turkish Historical Society in 1947.

In 1949, he was sent by the university to London, where he worked on Ottoman and Turkic inscriptions in the British Museum and attended seminars by Paul Wittek at the School of Oriental and African Studies. There, he met other influential historians such as Bernard Lewis. He attended a congress in Paris in 1950, where he met Fernand Braudel, whose work greatly influenced him. He returned to Turkey in 1951 and became a professor in the same department in 1952. He lectured as a visiting professor in Columbia University in 1953–54 and worked and studied as a research fellow at Harvard University in 1956 for a year. Upon his return to Turkey, he lectured on Ottoman, European and American history as well as administrative organization and Atatürk's reforms. In 1967, he lectured as a visiting professor in Princeton University and the University of Pennsylvania. He joined the International Association of Southeastern European Studies (French: Association Internationale des Etudes du Sud-Est Européen) in 1966 and held the presidency of this institution between 1971 and 1974.

In 1971, Harvard University offered him a permanent teaching position and the University of Pennsylvania offered him a five-year contract. He refused these, wishing to stay in Turkey. However in the meantime, the political turmoil in Turkey worsened and students became increasingly involved in conflict, hindering education. In 1972, he accepted an invitation to join the faculty of the University of Chicago, where he taught Ottoman history until 1986. Between 1990 and 1992, he lectured as a visiting professor at Harvard and Princeton. In 1992, he returned to Turkey after an invitation by Bilkent University, where he founded the history department, teaching at the postgraduate level, and taught until his death. In 1993, he donated his collection of books, journals and off-prints on the history of Ottoman Empire to the library of Bilkent University. He had been a member and president of many international organizations, he was a member of the Serbian Academy of Sciences and Arts in Department of Historical Sciences, also a member of the Institute of Turkish Studies.

İnalcık died on 25 July 2016 of multiple organ failures and is buried in the Fatih Mosque in Istanbul.

== Work and impact ==
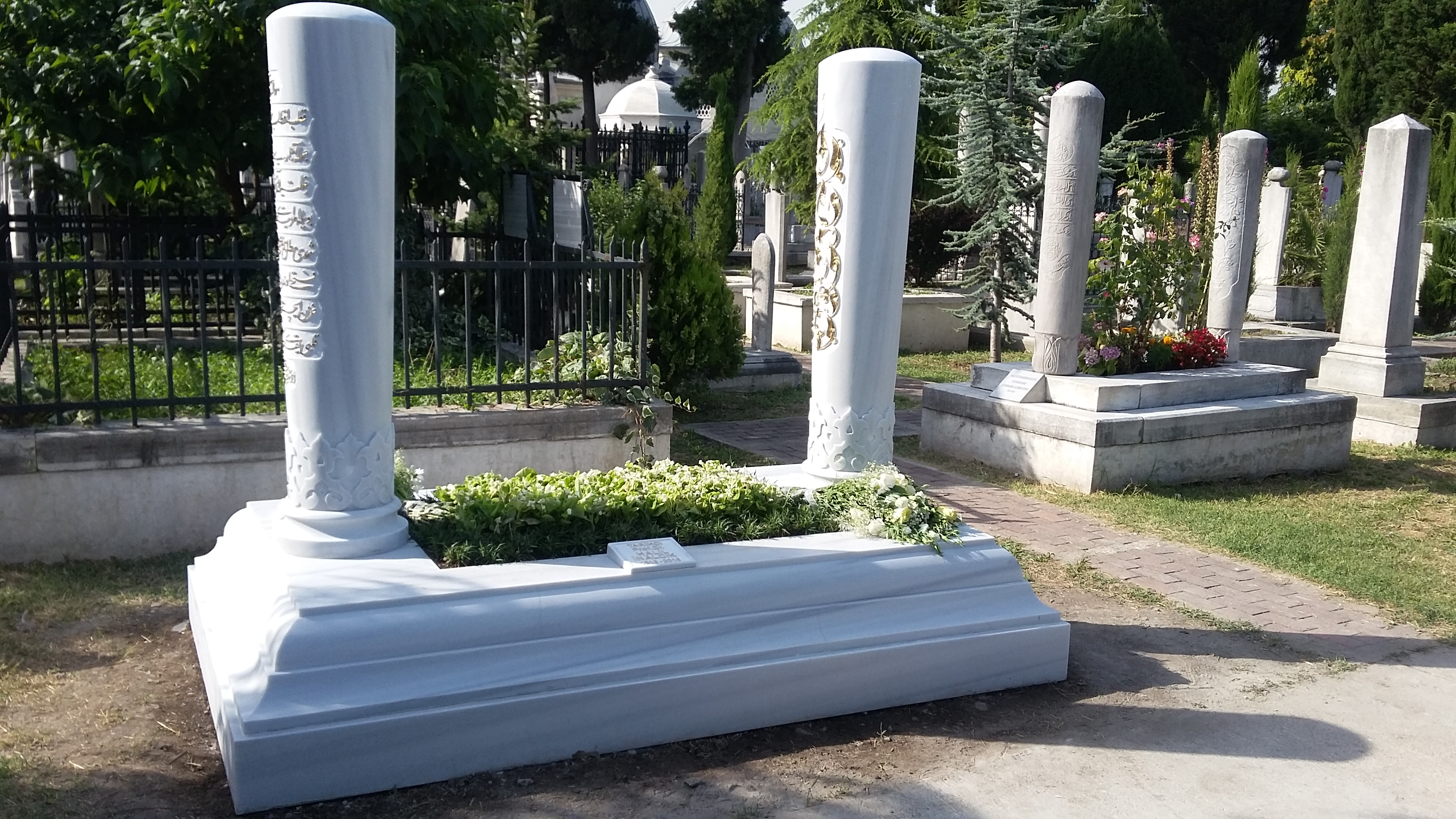
Halil İnalcık's grave, Fatih Mosque, Istanbul.

İnalcık's work was centered upon a social and economic analysis of the Ottoman Empire. He aimed at both countering what he saw as the hostile, biased narrative presented by western sources at the onset of his work and what he saw as an exaggerated, romanticized and nationalistic historiography in Turkey itself. He exemplified the biased western narrative he tried to dispel as Franz Babinger's depiction of Mehmed the Conqueror as a bloodthirsty, sadistic personality. He criticized generalizing approaches to Ottoman history as such approaches, he argued, lacked social or economic insight due to a lack of research. He was the first historian to study Ottoman judicial records in depth to deduce elements of the socioeconomic factors in the Ottoman society. When he first started his research in the 1940s, such documents were believed to be useless due in part to the recent change of alphabet and were being stored in unfavorable conditions or altogether destroyed.

İnalcık corrected a number of incorrect convictions about Ottoman and Turkish history. One such instance was his discovery that the proposition that the Ottoman dynasty belonged to the Kayı tribe was fabricated in the 15th century. According to Immanuel Wallerstein, İnalcık shaped the discipline of historical research with his unique methodology and led to many students in his school of thought approaching issues from a number of socioeconomic and cultural perspectives.

He was influenced by the works of Fuad Köprülü, Fernand Braudel and Ömer Lütfi Barkan.

=== List of publications ===
His most important work was his first book, Hicrî 835 tarihli Sûret-i defter-i sancak-i Arvanid (Copied of register for A.H. 835 in Sanjak of Albania), which was published at Ankara in 1954 and presented one of the earliest available land register in Ottoman Empire's archives.

- in English:
  - The Origin of the Ottoman-Russian Rivalry and the Don-Volga Canal (1569), Türk Tarih Kurumu Basımevi (1948)
  - The Policy of Mehmed II toward the Greek Population of Istanbul and the Byzantine Buildings of the City (1968)
  - Capital Formation in the Ottoman Empire, The Journal of Economic History, Vol. 29, No. 1, The Tasks of Economic History, pp. 97–140 (1969)
  - Ottoman Policy and Administration in Cyprus after the Conquest (1969)
  - History of the Ottoman Empire Classical Age, 1300–1600 (1973)
  - The Ottoman Empire: Conquest, Organization and Economy (1978)
  - Studies in Ottoman Social and Economic History (1985)
  - The Middle East and the Balkans under the Ottoman Empire: Essays on Economy and Society (1993)
  - An Economic and Social History of the Ottoman Empire, 1300–1914 (with Donald Quataert, 1994)
  - From Empire to Republic: Essays on Ottoman and Turkish Social History (1995)
  - Sources and Studies on the Ottoman Black Sea: The Customs Register of Caffa 1487–1490 (1996)
  - Essays in Ottoman History (1998)
- in Turkish:
  - Makaleler 1: Doğu Batı, Doğu Batı Yayınları, 2005
  - Fatih devri üzerinde tetkikler ve vesikalar Ankara, 1954
  - Osmanlı'da Devlet, Hukuk, Adalet, Eren Yayıncılık, 2000
  - Osmanlı İmparatorluğu'nun Ekonomik ve Sosyal Tarihi Cilt 1 1300-1600, Eren Yayıncılık, Prof. Dr. Donald Quataert ile, 2001
  - Osmanlı İmparatorluğu'nun Ekonomik ve Sosyal Tarihi Cilt 2 1600–1914, Eren Yayıncılık, 2004
  - Osmanlı İmparatorluğu – Toplum ve Ekonomi, Eren Yayıncılık
  - Osmanlı İmparatorluğu Klasik Çağ (1300–1600), Yapı Kredi Yayınları, 2003
  - Tanzimat ve Bulgar Meselesi, Eren Yayıncılık, 1992
  - ABD Tarihi, Allan Nevins ve Henry Steele Commager (Çeviri), Doğu Batı Yayınları, 2005
  - Şair ve Patron, Doğu Batı Yayınları, 2003
  - Balkanlar (Prof. Dr. Erol Manisalı ile), Eren Yayıncılık, 1993
  - Atatürk ve Demokratik Türkiye, Kırmızı Yayınları, 2007
  - Devlet-i Aliyye, Türkiye İş Bankası Yayınları, 2009
  - Kuruluş: Osmanlı Tarihini Yeniden Yazmak, Hayykitap, 2010
  - Osmanlılar: Fütühat ve Avrupa İle İlişkiler, Timaş Yayınları, 2010
  - Osmanlılar, Timaş Yayınları, 2010
  - Has-Bağçede 'Ayş u Tarab – Nedimler Şairler Mutripler, İş Bankası Kültür Yayınları, 2011
  - Kuruluş ve İmparatorluk Sürecinde Osmanlı, Timaş Yayınları, 2011
  - Tanzimat, Değişim Sürecinde Osmanlı İmparatorluğu (Mehmet Seyitdanlıoğlu ile), İş Bankası Kültür Yayınları, 2011
  - Rönesans Avrupası: Türkiye'nin Batı Medeniyetiyle Özdeşleşme Süreci, İş Bankası Kültür Yayınları, 2011
  - Osmanlı ve Modern Türkiye, Timaş Yayınları, 2013
  - Devlet-i 'Aliyye: Tagayyür ve Fesad, Osmanlı İmparatorluğu Üzerine Araştırmalar II, İş Bankası Kültür Yayınları, 2014

== Honorary degrees ==
- Emeritus Professorship, University of Chicago (1986)
- Boğaziçi University (1986)
- University of Athens (1987)
- Selçuk University (1992)
- Hebrew University of Jerusalem (1993)
- University of Bucharest (1993)
- Uludağ University (1995)
- Erciyes University (2011)

== Awards ==
- Islamic History, Art, and Culture Research Center Award (1986)
- Turkish Ministry of Foreign Affairs Distinguished Service Medal and Diploma (1991)
- Middle East Technical University Parlar Foundation Science Award (1992)
- Sedat Simavi Foundation Award for Social Sciences: Best Work of the Year in Social Sciences (1993)
- Titulesco Medal of High Service, Embassy of Romania in Ankara (1995)
- Istanbul University Institute of Turkic Studies Award (1998)
- Turkish Ministry of Culture Grand Award for Culture and Arts (2002)
- Soranos Friendship Award (2002)
- Hungarian Order of Merit (2003)
- Presidential Grand Award for Culture and Arts (2005)
- King Faisal Prize for Islamic Studies (2011)
- International Organization of Turkic Culture Honor Medal (2012)
