= 1516 =

1516 in various calendars
- Gregorian calendar: 1516; MDXVI
- Ab urbe condita: 2269
- Armenian calendar: 965; ԹՎ ՋԿԵ
- Assyrian calendar: 6266
- Balinese saka calendar: 1437–1438
- Bengali calendar: 922–923
- Berber calendar: 2466
- English Regnal year: 7 Hen. 8 – 8 Hen. 8
- Buddhist calendar: 2060
- Burmese calendar: 878
- Byzantine calendar: 7024–7025
- Chinese calendar: 乙亥年 (Wood Pig); 4213 or 4006 — to — 丙子年 (Fire Rat); 4214 or 4007
- Coptic calendar: 1232–1233
- Discordian calendar: 2682
- Ethiopian calendar: 1508–1509
- Hebrew calendar: 5276–5277
- Hindu calendars
- Vikram Samvat: 1572–1573
- Shaka Samvat: 1437–1438
- Kali Yuga: 4616–4617
- Holocene calendar: 11516
- Igbo calendar: 516–517
- Iranian calendar: 894–895
- Islamic calendar: 921–922
- Japanese calendar: Eishō 13 (永正１３年)
- Javanese calendar: 1433–1434
- Julian calendar: 1516; MDXVI
- Korean calendar: 3849
- Minguo calendar: 396 before ROC 民前396年
- Nanakshahi calendar: 48
- Thai solar calendar: 2058–2059
- Tibetan calendar: ཤིང་མོ་ཕག་ལོ་ (female Wood-Boar); 1642 or 1261 or 489 — to — མེ་ཕོ་བྱི་བ་ལོ་ (male Fire-Rat); 1643 or 1262 or 490

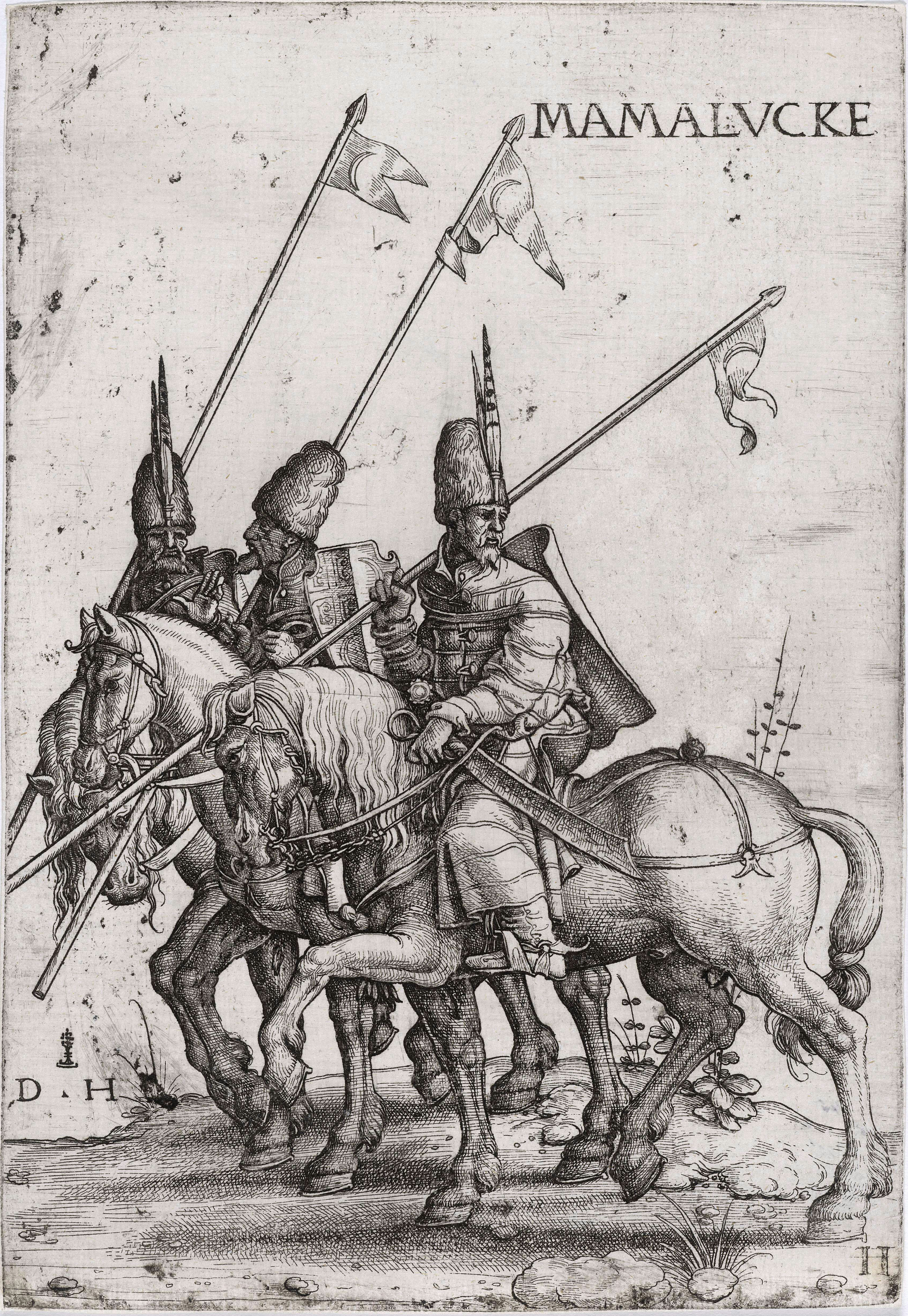
July: Selim I declares war on the Mamluk Sultanate of Cairo.

Year 1516 (MDXVI) was a leap year starting on Tuesday of the Julian calendar, there is also a leap year starting on Saturday of the Gregorian calendar.

== Events ==
=== January–March ===
- January 20 – Juan Díaz de Solís arrives in what is now Punta del Este in Uruguay, where he becomes the first European to sail into the Río de la Plata (in future Argentina). Díaz and nine of his men are attacked and killed by the local Charrúa people shortly after their arrival. although there was likely an expedition earlier in 1511-1512 by João de Lisboa and Estevão de Fróis.
- January 23 – With the death of Ferdinand II of Aragon, his grandson, Charles of Ghent, becomes King of Spain; his mother Queen Joanna of Castile also succeeds as Queen of Aragon and co-monarch with Carlos, but remains confined at Tordesillas.
- February 18 – After two months in Bologna, part of the Papal States in Italy, Pope Leo X concludes two months of negotiation with King François I of France. Their talks result in the abrogation of the French Pragmatic Sanction, and the conclusion of a new Concordat between the Papacy and France.
- February 21 – Sir Edward Poynings becomes England's ambassador to Spain a second time and meets with King Carlos I to negotiate a treaty.
- February 25 – In his capacity as Lord of Ireland, Henry VIII opens the first of six assemblies of parliament during his reign of the Parliament of Ireland at Dublin. The parliament holds three sessions, ending on October 2, when it is dismissed.
- March 1 – Desiderius Erasmus publishes a new Greek edition of the New Testament, Novum Instrumentum omne, in Basel.
- March 13 – At the age of 9, Louis II of Jagiellon becomes the new King of Hungary, Croatia and Bohemia upon the death of his father, King Vladislaus II.
- March 29 – The Venetian Ghetto is instituted in the Republic of Venice.

=== April–June ===
- April 19 – England, represented by Ambassador Poynings and Spain's King Carlos I conclude a treaty of alliance.
- April 23 – The Reinheitsgebot is instituted in Ingolstadt, Bavaria, regulating the purity of beer permissible for sale.
- May 6 – A Category IX earthquake strikes Ragusa in the Republic of Ragusa.
- May 8 – In what is now Vietnam, Le Tuong Duc, Emperor of Dai Viet, since 1509, is murdered at his palace at Thang Long (now in Hanoi) by his bodyguards. Le Tuong Duc's 12-year-old nephew, Le Chieu Tong, is installed as the new Emperor by the conspirators.
- June 14 – In Spain, King John III of Navarre dies after a reign of 32 years and is succeeded by his widow, Queen Catherine.

=== July–September ===
- July 4 – King James V of Scotland opens the Scottish Parliament at Edinburgh.
- July 28 – Selim I of the Ottoman Empire captures the city of Malatya (located in what is now southeastern Turkey) as the first conquest in his war against the Mamluk Sultanate of Egypt and then proceeds to invade Syria.
- July 30 – John V, Count of Nassau-Siegen dies in Siegen, now in Germany, leaving his realm to be divided by his two sons. The transition is smooth because of a 1509 agreement between Henry III of Nassau-Breda and William I of Nassau-Dillenburg. William receives all of John V's possessions in Germany, while Henry inherits those in the Low Countries.
- August 13 – The Treaty of Noyon is signed. King François I of France recognizes Charles I of Spain's claim to Naples, and Charles recognizes Francis's claim to Milan. The treaty also promised Louise of France to Charles.
- August 18 – King Francis I of France and Pope Leo X sign the Concordat of Bologna, agreeing on the relationship between church and state in France.
- August 24 – Ottoman–Mamluk War (1516–17): The Ottoman Sultan Selim I defeats the Mamluk forces commanded by the sultan Al-Ashraf Qansuh al-Ghuri in the Battle of Marj Dabiq, bringing all of the Middle East. The Mamluk Sultan, Al-Ashraf Qansuh al-Ghuri, is killed while leading his troops in the battle, and Prime Minister Al-Ashraf Tuman Bay, who was left in charge in Cairo by the Sultan Qansuh, becomes the Sultan of Egypt, the last remaining part of the Mamluk Sultanate.
- September 16 – German theologian Andreas Karlstadt completes his series of 151 theses, an attack against corruption in the Roman Catholic Church.
- September 17 – Based in Kamaran, an island in the Red Sea, the Mamluk Egyptian Admiral Selman Reis leads of fleet 19 ships in an unsuccessful attempt to take Yemen and Aden.

=== October–December ===
- October 28 – Ottoman–Mamluk War (1516–17): Ottoman forces under the Grand Vizier Sinan Pasha defeat the Mamluks in the Battle of Yaunis Khan near Gaza.
- November 29 – The "Treaty of Perpetual Peace" is signed in the city of Fribourg in Switzerland, between representatives of the Thirteen Cantons of the Old Swiss Confederacy, and King Francis of the Kingdom of France, confirming the French victory in the 1515 Battle of Marignano. The Swiss Confederacy renounces all claims to the French protectorate of Milan in Italy, in for 700,000 gold crowns in compensation.
- December 4 – Treaty of Brussels: Peace is declared between the Kingdom of France and the Holy Roman Empire.
- c. December – Thomas More's most famous work, Utopia, completed this year, is published in Leuven (in Latin).

=== Date unknown ===
- Italian explorer Rafael Perestrello, a cousin of the wife of Christopher Columbus, commands an expedition from Portuguese Malacca to land on the shores of mainland southern China, and trade with Chinese merchants at Guangzhou, during the Ming Dynasty.
- Portuguese soldier Fernão Lopes becomes the first known permanent inhabitant of Saint Helena.
- Leonardo da Vinci accepts Francis I's invitation to France.
- The predecessor of the Royal Mail, known as the Master of the Posts, is established by Henry VIII of England.
- Gillingham School is founded, the oldest in Dorset, England.
- Fuggerei is established in Augsburg (Bavaria), as the world's oldest social housing complex still in use.
- The fall of the Nantan meteorite is possibly observed near the city of Nantan, Nandan County, Guangxi (China).

== Births ==
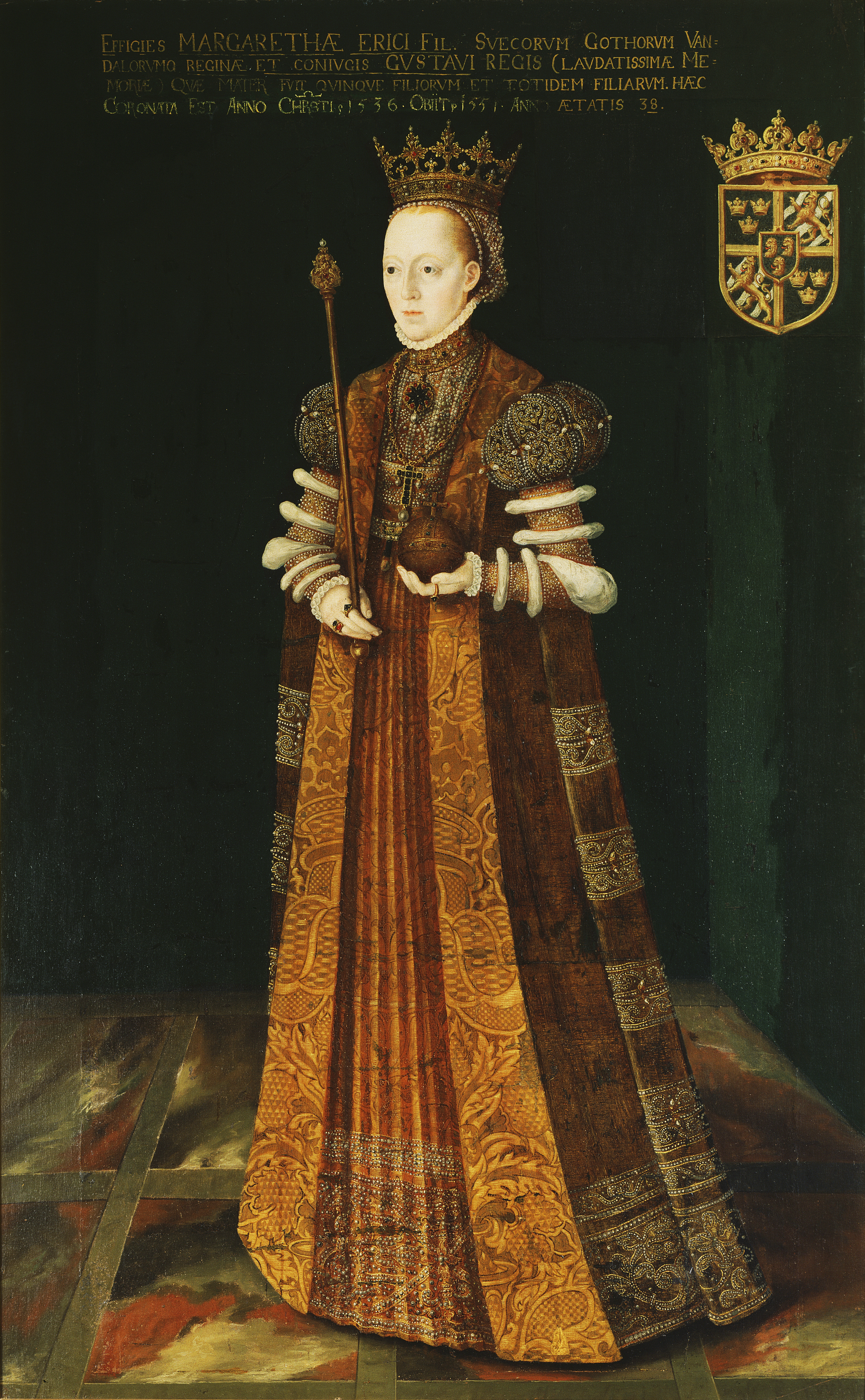
Margaret Leijonhufvud

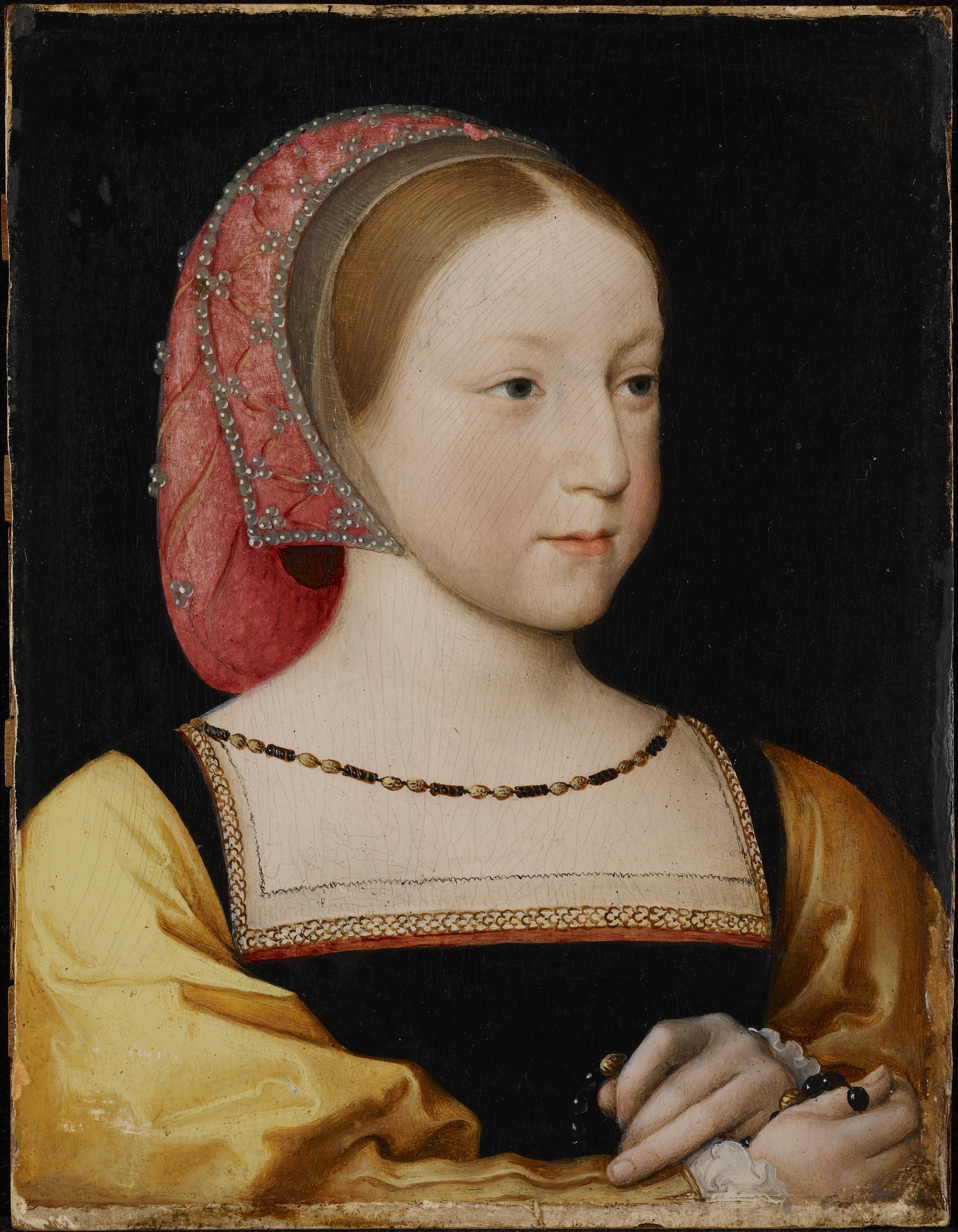
Charlotte of Valois

- January 1 – Margaret Leijonhufvud, queen of Gustav Vasa of Sweden (d. 1551)
- January 14 – Herluf Trolle, Danish admiral (d. 1565)
- January 16 – Bayinnaung, King of Burma (d. 1581)
- February 2 – Girolamo Zanchi, Italian theologian (d. 1590)
- February 16 – Prospero Spani, Italian sculptor (d. 1584)
- February 18 – Queen Mary I of England, daughter of King Henry VIII and Queen Catherine of Aragon (d. 1558)
- March 15 – Alqas Mirza, Safavid prince (d. 1550)
- March 26 – Conrad Gessner, Swiss naturalist (d. 1565)
- April 16 – Tabinshwehti, King of Burma (d. 1550)
- April 23 – Georg Fabricius, Protestant German poet (d. 1571)
- June 28 – Charles Blount, 5th Baron Mountjoy, English courtier and patron of learning (d. 1544)
- July 27 – Emilie of Saxony, German nobleman (d. 1591)
- July 28 – William, Duke of Jülich-Cleves-Berg, German nobleman (d. 1592)
- August 13 – Hieronymus Wolf, German historian (d. 1580)
- September 2 – Francis I, Duke of Nevers (d. 1561)
- September 21 – Matthew Stewart, 4th Earl of Lennox (d. 1571)
- October 23 – Charlotte of Valois, French princess (d. 1524)
- October 27 – Ruy Gómez de Silva, Portuguese noble (d. 1573)
- November 5 – Martin Helwig, German cartographer of Silesia (d. 1574)
- December 21 – Giuseppe Leggiadri Gallani, Italian poet and dramatist (d. 1590)
- date unknown
  - John Foxe, biographer (d. 1587)
  - Manco Inca Yupanqui, ruler of the Inca (d. 1544)
  - Canghali of Kazan, khan of Qasim and Kazan (d. 1535)
  - Margaretha Coppier, Dutch heroine (d. 1597)

== Deaths ==
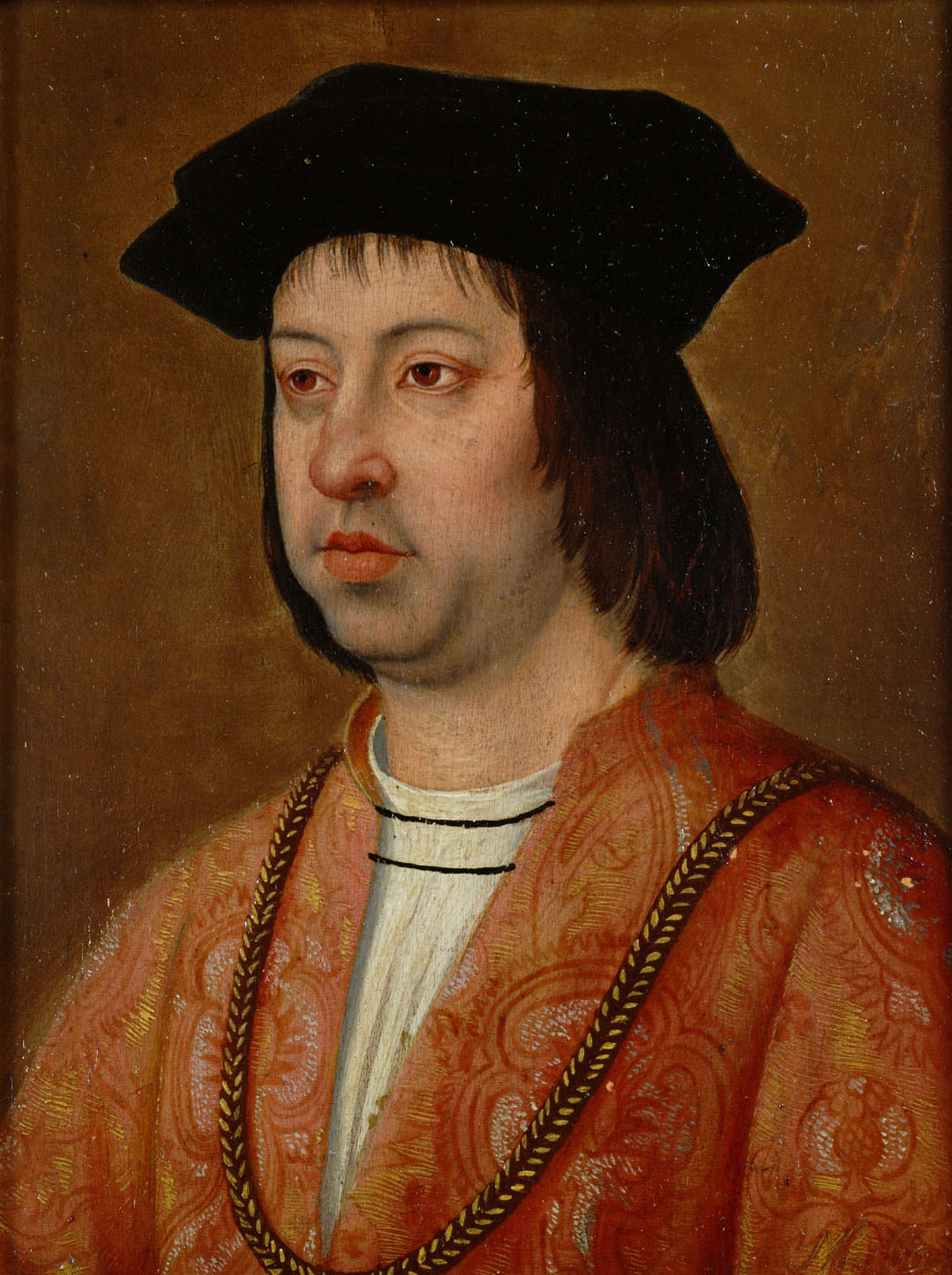
Ferdinand II of Aragon

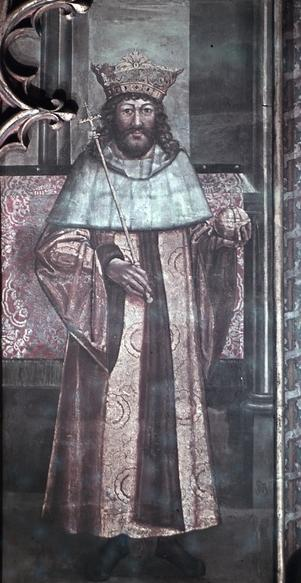
Vladislaus II of Bohemia and Hungary

- January 20 – Juan Díaz de Solís, Spanish navigator and explorer (b. 1470)
- January 23 – King Ferdinand II of Aragon (b. 1452)
- February 4 – Anthony of Supraśl, Polish Orthodox priest and saint
- March 13 – Vladislaus II, king of Bohemia, Hungary and Croatia (b. 1456)
- March 17 – Giuliano de' Medici, Duke of Nemours, ruler of Florence (b. 1449)
- April 25 – John Yonge, English diplomat (b. 1467)
- June 14 – King John III of Navarre (b. 1469)
- July 10 – Alice FitzHugh, English heir (b. 1448)
- July 30 – John V, Count of Nassau-Siegen, German count (b. 1455)
- August 9 (bur.) – Hieronymus Bosch, Dutch painter (b. 1450)
- August 21 – John III of Egmont, Dutch count (b. 1438)
- August 24 – Al-Ashraf Qansuh al-Ghuri, Mamluk sultan (b. c. 1441)
- October 30 – Louis Malet de Graville, Admiral of France, politician, military leader and art patron (b. c. 1440).
- November 26 – Giovanni Bellini, Venetian painter (b. 1430)
- December 13 – Johannes Trithemius, German scholar and cryptographer (b. 1462)
- date unknown – Giuliano da Sangallo, Florentine sculptor and architect (b. 1443)
