= Capture of Cairo (1517) =

1517 capture of the capital of the Mamluk Sultanate

Coordinates: 30°04′N 31°13′E

- Part of the Ottoman–Mamluk War (1516–1517)
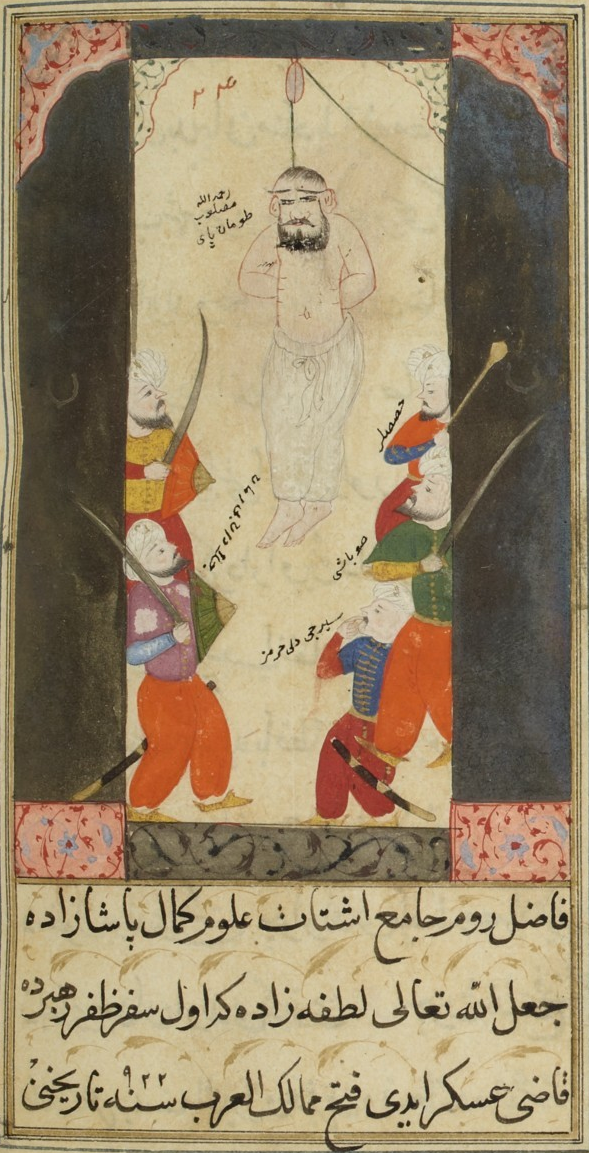
- Execution of Tuman Bay II
Date	27–30 January 1517
Location	Cairo, present-day Egypt
Result	Ottoman victory: Cairo captured by the Ottomans; Egypt annexed by the Ottoman Empire; End of the Abbasid dynasty; Execution of Tuman bay II

Belligerents
Ottoman Empire	Mamluk Sultanate: Abbasid Caliphate of Cairo

Commanders and leaders
Selim I Yunus Pasha	Tuman Bay II (executed); Al-Mutawakkil (POW)

Strength
Unknown	10,000–20,000

Casualties and losses
- 25,000 Ottoman and Mamluk military deaths 50,000 civilians dead

The capture of Cairo was the final major engagement of the Ottoman Mamluk War of 1516–1517. The city of Cairo, the capital of the Mamluk Sultanate, was sacked and fell into the hands of the Ottoman forces led by Sultan Selim I during 27–30 January 1517. Following Cairo's fall and the subsequent execution of the last Mamluk Sultan and member of the Abbasid dynasty: Tuman Bay II, the Mamluk Sultanate was absorbed into the expanding Ottoman Empire.

== Background ==
The Mamluk Sultanate of Egypt was a Muslim dynasty in Egypt (1250–1517). The Mamluks constituted a class of military slaves of either Turkic or Circassian origin. After a coup in 1250, they began ruling in Egypt and they annexed Syria and Palestine to their realm. Initially, the relations between the Mamluk Sultanate and the Ottoman Empire in Turkey and the Balkans were friendly. However during the last years of the 15th century, the competition to control south Turkey (Çukurova, Cilicia of the antiquity) deteriorated the relations.

Furthermore, during the Ottoman-Safavid (Persia) war the Dulkadirids, which was a Mamluk vassal, supported the Safavids. After the Battle of Chaldiran in 1514, Ottoman vizier (later grand vizier) Hadim Sinan Pasha retaliated by annexing Dulkadirid territory (most of South East Anatolia) after the Battle of Turnadag to the Ottoman realm in 1515. The tensions between the two great powers led to conflict. Ottoman Sultan Selim I (reigned 1512-1520) won two decisive battles, the Battle of Marj Dabiq in 1516 and the Battle of Ridaniya in 1517.

== Conquest of Cairo ==
After the battle of Ridaniya (23 January 1517) Selim encamped on the island of Vustaniye (or Burac) facing Cairo, the capital. But he didn't enter Cairo. Because Tumanbay II the sultan of the Mamluks as well as Kayıtbay another leader of the Mamluks had managed to escape, Selim decided to concentrate on arresting the leaders before entering Cairo. Thus he sent only a vanguard regiment to Cairo on 26 January. Although the regiment was able to enter the capital without much fighting, the same night Tumanbay also secretly came to the capital. With the assistance of some Cairo citizens, he raided the Ottoman forces in the capital and began controlling Cairo. After hearing the news of Tumanbay's presence in Cairo, Selim sent his Janissaries to the city. After several days' fighting the Ottoman forces entered the city on 3 February 1517. Selim entered the city and sent messages of victory (Turkish: zafername) to other rulers about the conquest of Cairo. Nevertheless, the leaders of the Mamluks were still on the loose.

== Aftermath ==
Tumanbay escaped from Cairo and tried to organize a new army composed of Egyptians together with what was left out of the Mamluk army. His army was smaller in size and capacity compared to the Ottoman army. But he was planning to raid Selim's camp on Vustatiye island. However, Selim heard about his plan and sent a force on Tumanbay to forestall his plans. After some small-scale clashes, Tumanbay was arrested on 26 March 1517. Selim's initial decision was to send Mamluk notables to İstanbul. But after a while, he changed his decision. Tumanbay and the other notable Mamluks were executed on 13 April 1517 at the Bab Zuweila by a former Mamluk commander who had switched sides.

== Bibliography ==
- Иванов Н. А. (1984). Османское завоевание арабских стран, 1516-1574. Изд-во "Наука," Глав. ред. восточной лит-ры.
- Петросян, Юрий Ашотович (2013). Османская империя. Величайшие империи человечества. М.: Алгоритм. pp. 63–65. ISBN 9785443801001.
