= Kingdoms of Fire =

- ممالك النار
- Genre: Historical drama
- Created by: Muhammed Abdulmalik
- Directed by: Peter Webber
- Countries of origin: Egypt; Tunisia; United Arab Emirates
- Original language: Arabic
- No. of seasons: 1
- No. of episodes: 14

Production
- Running time: 50–60 minutes
- Production company: Genomedia Studios

Original release
- Release: 17 November – 9 December 2019

Kingdoms of Fire (Arabic: ممالك النار, romanized: Mamalik Al-Nar) is an Arabic Anti-Ottoman historical drama television series about the reign of the Ottoman Empire's Selim I and the Mamluk Sultanate's Tuman bay II, created by Muhammed Abdulmalik and directed by British director Peter Webber.

The 14-episode series was produced by Genomedia Studios with a budget of $40 million, financed and supported by the government of Saudi Arabia and the United Arab Emirates, the originator of the series, and filmed in Tunisia. It debuted on MBC channels on 17 November 2019.

Fatima Bhutto of Foreign Policy wrote that the show is "an expensive salvo against Turkey’s cultural neo-Ottomanism" and that the director was chosen for "added cachet".

== Overview ==
The series depicts events that took place between Egypt, Syria and the Ottoman Empire between the 15th and the 16th century. It demonstrates the competition between the Mamluks and the Ottomans over the control of the Middle East, through the rise of two main characters, Tuman bay II, the last Sultan of the Mamluks in Cairo, and Sultan Selim I of Istanbul.

== Cast ==
- Rafic Ali Ahmad, Mehmed the Conqueror
- Abdulmonem Amairy, Bayezid II
- Rashid Assaf, Al-Ashraf Qansuh al-Ghuri
- Nadine Tahseen Bek, Gülbahar Hatun
- Khaled El Nabawy, Tuman bay II
- Mahmoud Nasr, Selim I
- Hala Rajab, Ayşe Hatun
- Kosai Al-Shofi, Suleiman the Magnificent
- Souhir Ben Amara, Hafsa Sultan
- Yassine Ben Gamra, Kurtbay
- Fethi Haddaoui, Qaitbay Al-Ragbi
- Alaa Al-Zuabi, Şehzade Ahmet
- Ramez Al-Aswad, Hadım Sinan Pasha
- Yamen Fayoumy, Sultan Cem
- Nedal Nejem, Hayır Bey
- Shadi Safadi, Yunus Pasha
- Saad Minah, Janbirdi al-Ghazali
- Farazdaq Dyub, Şehzade Korkut

== Reception ==
Bhutto, a Pakistani journalist, stated in 2020 that the show in terms of an anti-Ottomanist production "has apparently failed; no one seems to be watching" in Pakistan.

== Criticism ==
Multiple critics after the episodes aired characterized the show as harassment targeted at Turkey and as anti-Turkish, reflecting recent tensions between Turkey and both Saudi Arabia and the United Arab Emirates. It was seen as an attempt by the Saudi government to sour public opinion against Turkey.
