= Ottoman wars in Asia =

Series of military conflicts between the Ottoman Empire and various Asian states

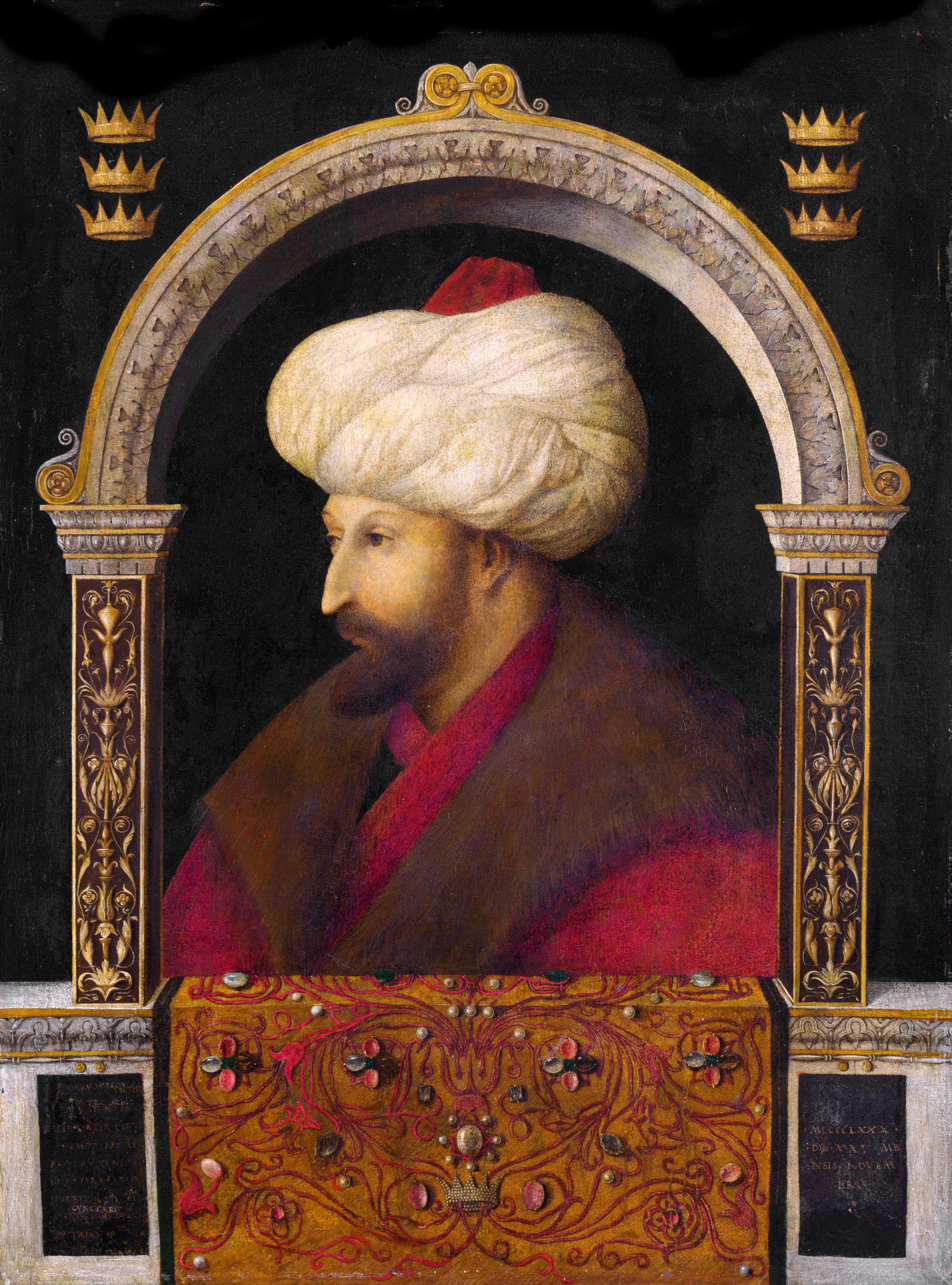
Mehmed II the Conqueror

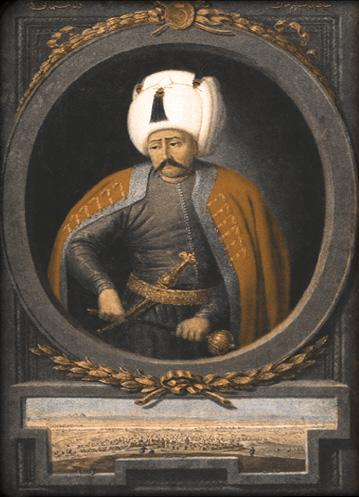
Selim I the Grim

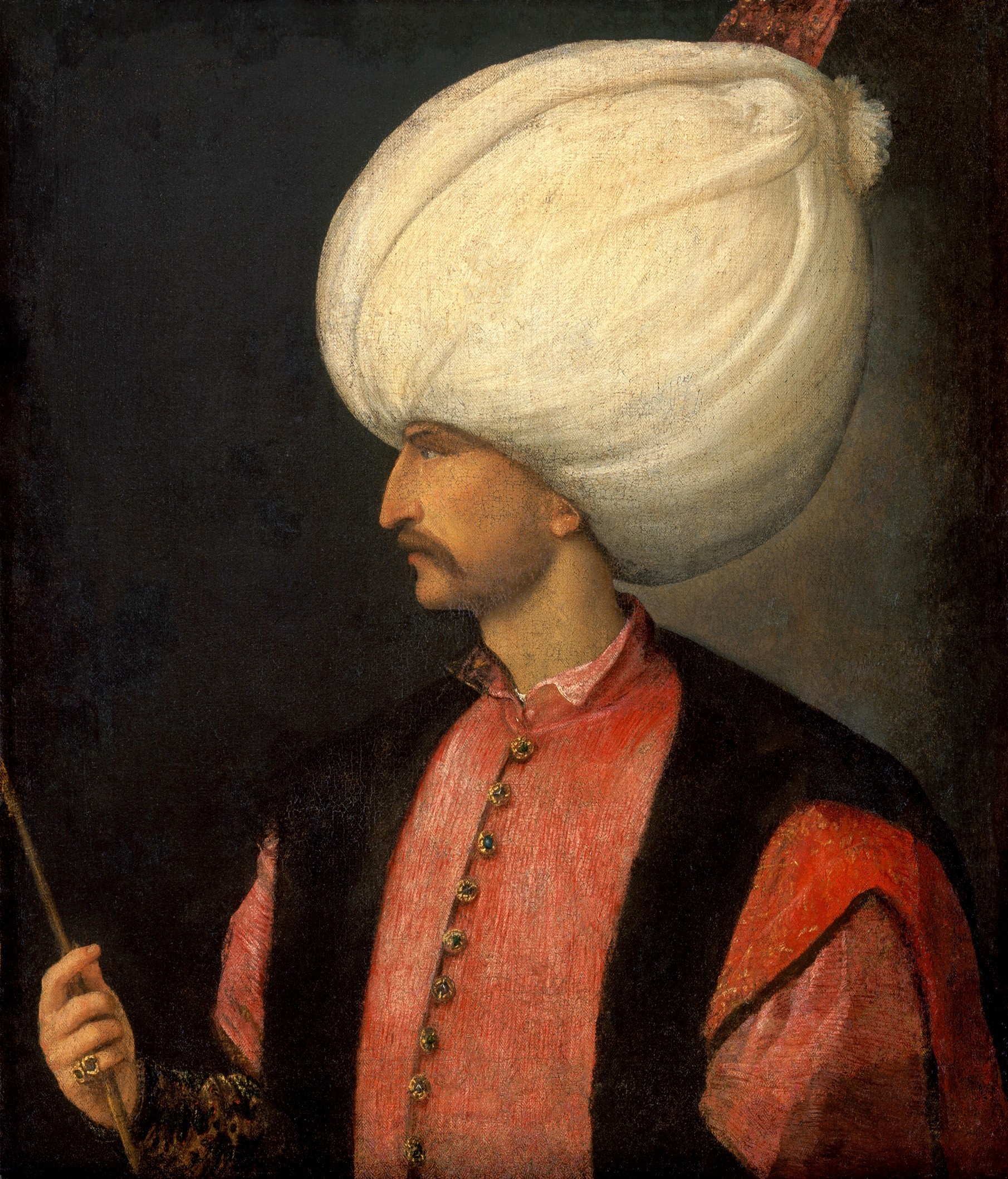
Suleiman I the Magnificent

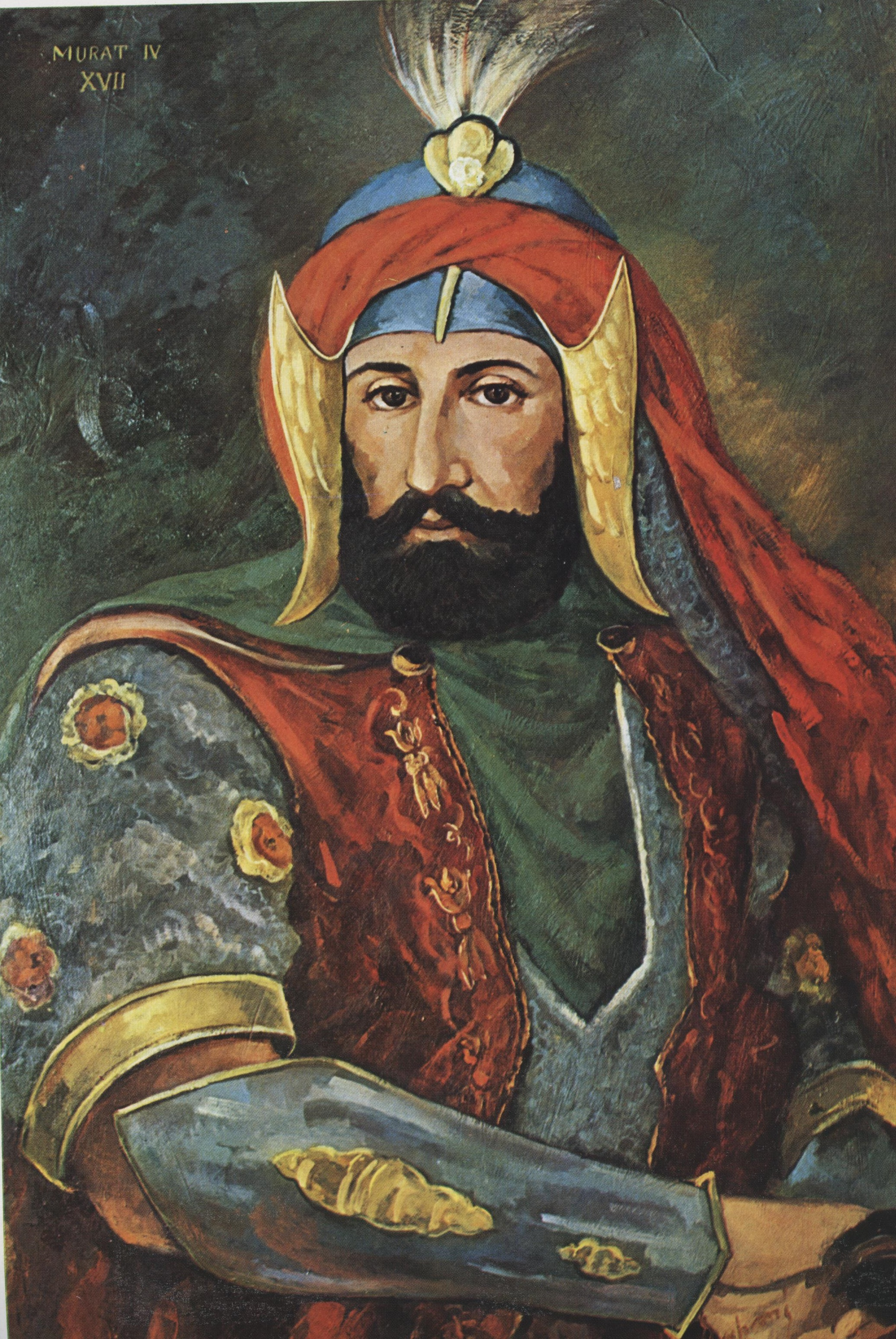
Murad IV

Ottoman wars in Asia refers to the wars involving the Ottoman Empire in Asia. The Ottoman Empire was founded at the beginning of the 14th century. Its original settlement was in the northwest Anatolia (the Asian part of modern-day Turkey) where it was a small beylik (principality). Its main rival was the Byzantine Empire. In the 1350s, the Ottomans were able to cross the Dardanelles Strait and eventually they conquered most of the Balkans. Although they mainly concentrated their expansion in Europe, they also expanded their territories in Asia, mainly in the Fertile Crescent and Arabian Peninsula.

== Wars against other beyliks ==
In the early years of the 14th century, there were many Turkish beyliks in Anatolia. The first Ottoman sultan (then known as bey) Osman I avoided provoking neighbouring beyliks. The second sultan, Orhan, was the very first Ottoman ruler who was engaged in a war against other beyliks. He interfered in a civil war in Karesi, another beylik to the south of Ottoman beylik and annexed the territory of Karesi. His son Murad I established hegemony over most of the beyliks in Anatolia mainly by diplomacy (dowery, purchase, etc.) Bayezid I continued expansion policy by harsher methods. At the end of the 14th century most beyliks were incorporated into the Ottoman realm. However, in 1402, Beyazıt was defeated by Timur, a Turkic conqueror from Turkestan in the Battle of Ankara and the newly annexed beyliks (except Karesi) regained their independence. During the reigns of Mehmed I, Murad II and Mehmed II (the Conqueror), Ottomans reconquered all beyliks with the exception of two, which were the vassals of Mamluk Empire in Egypt.

== Wars against Christian principalities in Anatolia ==
During Ottoman expansion, there were only three important Christian territories; Armenian Kingdom of Cilicia in Çukurova (Cilicia in south Turkey) was conquered by the Mamluks of Egypt in 1375 and İzmir, a part of Knights Hospitaller, was captured by Timur in 1402. Timur handed İzmir to Aydın Beylik, from whom the Ottomans later captured it from. Empire of Trebizond in east Black Sea region was conquered by Mehmed II in 1461. There were also some Christian (Republic of Genoa, Republic of Venice) forts some of which were in alliance with Karaman Beylik. When Ottomans conquered Karaman, the most important beylik, during the reign of Mehmed II, these forts also fell to Ottoman Empire.

== Wars against Turkmens in eastern Anatolia ==
Towards the end of the 14th century, the region east of Central Anatolia was under the hegemony of a Turkmen leader named Kadı Burhaneddin. Bayezid I tried to conquer his territory without success. After his death and the short-term Timurid rule of the 15th century, Turkmen tribes in the east were united into a tribal confederation named Akkoyunlu (Turkish for "White Sheep"). In 1473, Mehmed II defeated Akkoyunlu sultan Uzun Hasan in the Battle of Otlukbeli. After this battle all of the Central Anatolia and parts of East Anatolia became Ottoman possessions.

== Wars against Mamluk Egypt ==
Egypt was under the rule of a military caste, the Mamluks. The Mamluks were originally Turks and Circassians. The Ottomans were unable to defeat Mamluks in the initial clashes during the reign of Beyazıt II. However the Mamluks supported Safavid Persia against the Ottomans and this gave the Ottoman sultan Selim I (the Grim) the necessary cause to wage war against Egypt. His grand vizier Hadim Sinan Pasha defeated Dulkadir Beylik in Southeast Anatolia, a Mamluk vassal in 1516. Ramazan Beylik, the other Mamluk vassal in Çukurova (Cilicia) voluntarily accepted the Ottoman suzerainty. During Selim’s long campaign to Egypt in 1516-18, Mamluks were defeated three times; in the Battle of Marj Dabiq, the Battle of Yaunis Khan and the Battle of Ridanieh (the first and the third personally commanded by Selim and the second by Hadim Sinan Pasha). Syria, Palestine, Jordan and Lebanon as well as Egypt came under Ottoman rule. Hejaz region (of Saudi Arabia) voluntarily accepted Ottoman suzerainty.

== Wars against Safavid Persia ==
After the death of Uzun Hasan of Akkoyunlu, Ismail I of Safavid dynasty gained control of Persia and East Anatolia. Sectarian differences between the two states led to a war. In 1514 Selim I defeated the Persian army in the Battle of Chaldiran and annexed most of East Anatolia. The war continued during the reign of Suleyman I, with campaigns being led against Persia in 1534–35, 1548–49 and 1553–55. The war ended by the Treaty of Amasya in 1555. East Anatolia as well as mid and north Iraq became parts of the Ottoman Empire, while south Iraq fell voluntarily to Ottoman suzerainty, forming the start of Ottoman Iraq.

Ottomans annexed most of West Iran and Caucasus by the Treaty of Ferhat Pasha at the end of the renewed war of 1578-1590 during the reign of Murad III. But after the attack of Shah Abbas of Persia, they had to abandon their 1590-gains by the Treaty of Nasuh Pasha in 1612 during the reign of Ahmed I. In 1623, Persians also captured Baghdad in mid Iraq, but Murad IV recaptured the city in 1639. At the end of the war the present western borderline of Iran was drawn by the Treaty of Zuhab.

== Further Persian wars ==
During Afsharid and Qajar dynasties of Persia, Ottomans fought against Persia numerous times with relatively little changes in the gained and lost territories except during the reign of Nader Shah, when large territories were abandoned to Persia but were recovered upon his death. At the end of the wars, with the last one ending in 1823, the border line drawn was almost the same as that of the Treaty of Zuhab (present Turkey-Iran and Iraq-Iran border lines).

== Naval wars in the Indian Ocean ==
In 1538, Suleyman I sent a navy to the Indian Ocean. Although Hadım Suleiman Pasha, the captain of the navy failed to capture any bridgehead in India, he captured Aden and most of Yemen. A few years later, a Portuguese Navy tried to dominate in the Red Sea after Süleyman Pasha's return. However Ottoman captain Piri Reis (an important cartographer of the 16th century) defeated the navy and restored the Ottoman dominance in the Red Sea in 1548. In 1552, he captured Muscat and the south coasts of Arabian Peninsula. Later he also captured small forts in the Persian Gulf. Ottoman dominance on most of Arabian Peninsula continued up to 20th century.

== Napoleonic wars ==
General Napoleon Bonaparte of France invaded Egypt in 1798 and tried to annex Palestine as well. He easily captured Jaffa. His next target was Acre (now in north Israel) for the city controlled the route between Syria and Egypt. But after the stubborn defense of the city under the governor Cezzar Ahmet Pasha he had to retreat.

== Aftermath ==
After the Treaty of Zuhab in 1638, Ottoman Empire was able to keep the Asiatic territories up to the 20th century except for the disputable territories of the south and east coasts of the Arabian Peninsula. In the early years of the 20th century the main problem was the rebellion in Yemen which was subdued. Ottoman Empire fought against the Allies in the First World War and was defeated. According to Armistice of Mudros Ottoman Empire accepted the loss of all territories in the Arabian Peninsula, Syria, Palestine, Jordan, Lebanon and most of Iraq. Although Turkey and North Iraq were still under Ottoman rule, soon Allies occupied the Mediterranean coast and North Iraq. They also offered Aegean coast (as well as Thrace) to Greece and eastern Anatolia to newly established Armenia by the Treaty of Sèvres. However the treaty became ineffective during the Turkish War of Independence. At the end of the war the Ottoman Empire ceased to exist in 1922. The newly established Turkish Republic kept Mediterranean and Aegean coasts as well as the Eastern Anatolia by the Treaty of Lausanne.

== See also ==
- List of wars involving the Ottoman Empire
- Ottoman wars in Europe
- Ottoman wars in Africa
- Military of the Ottoman Empire

== Sources ==
- Halil İnalcık (2010). Kuruluş Dönemi Osmanlı Sultanları, 1302-1481. Istanbul: İslam Araştırmaları Merkezi. p. 262. ISBN 978-605-5586-06-5.
- Nicolae Jorga (2009). Geschichte des Osmanischen Reiches. trans by Nilüfer Epçeli. Istanbul: Yeditepe yayınları. ISBN 978-975-6480-18-2.
- Gábor Ágoston; Bruce Masters (2009). Encyclopaedia of the Ottoman Empire. p. 650. ISBN 978-0-8160-6259-1.
- Lord Kinross (2008). The Ottoman Centuries. trans by Meral Gaspıralı. Istanbul: Altın Kitaplar. ISBN 978-975-21-0955-1.
