= Ottoman–Mamluk War (1516–1517) =

Imperial Ottoman conquest of Egypt and the Levant

Ottoman-Mamluk War
- Part of the Ottoman wars in the Near East
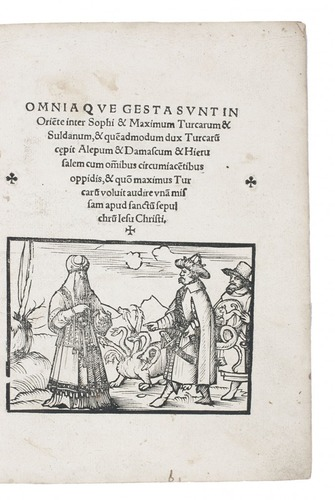
- News pamphlet relating the Ottoman–Mamluk War (1516–1517), including an account of Sultan Selim's visit to Jerusalem. Printed in Basel, dated 1518
Date	1516 – 22 January 1517
Location	Anatolia, Levant, Egypt
Result	Ottoman victory
Territorial changes	Annexation of the Mamluk Sultanate by the Ottoman Empire: Fall of the Mamluk Sultanate and Abbasid Caliphate of Cairo; Proclamation of the Ottoman Caliphate

Belligerents
Ottoman Empire	Mamluk Sultanate

Commanders and leaders
Selim I Commanders: Sinan Pasha †; Mimar Sinan; Yunus Pasha (WIA); Bıyıklı Pasha; Ayas Pasha; Deli Pasha; Zeynel Pasha; Shahsuwaroghlu Beg; Ramazanoğlu Bey †; Hayır Bey; Janbirdi al-Ghazali; Hazinedar Agha †; Yunus Bey †; Kapıcıbaşı Bey; Idris Bitlisi; Hüseyin Pasha (executed); Saadet I Giray; Mübârek Giray †	Qansuh II al-Ghuri †; Tuman Bay II (executed) Commanders: Yunus Bey; Janbirdi al-Ghazali (WIA); Hayır Bey; Shadi Baig †; Pîr Arslan †; Shihab Ahmad; Alaa el-Emam; Nasireddin Bey (surrendered); Temer ez-Zeredkaş; Seyyid al-Badawi; Ashraf-i Kadiriye; Kasım Bey (executed); Temer ez-Zeredkaş; Hyacinth al-Osman; Mukaddem-u el-Mamalik; Sûdûn †; Cherkess b. Amir Qansuh (POW); Abdulkadir al-Qasrawi †; Turabay †; Temeraz †; Akbay et-tavîl †; Bibers †; Sharif Barakat of Mecca (surrendered)

Casualties and losses
26,000–29,000	88,000–160,000 (including civilians)

The Ottoman–Mamluk War of 1516–1517 was the second major conflict between the Egypt-based Mamluk Sultanate and the Ottoman Empire, which led to the Fall of the Mamluk Sultanate and the incorporation of the Levant, Egypt, and the Hejaz as provinces of the Ottoman Empire. The war transformed the Ottoman Empire from a realm at the margins of the Islamic world, mainly located in Anatolia and the Balkans, to a huge empire encompassing much of the traditional lands of Islam, including the cities of Mecca, Cairo, Damascus, and Aleppo. Despite this expansion, the seat of the empire's political power remained in Constantinople.

== Background ==
The relationship between the Ottomans and the Mamluks had been adversarial since the fall of Constantinople to the Ottomans in 1453; both states vied for control of the spice trade, and the Ottomans aspired to eventually take control of the Holy Cities of Islam. An earlier conflict, which lasted from 1485 to 1491, had led to a stalemate. Having vanquished the Safavid Persians at the Battle of Chaldiran in 1514, sultan Selim I was eager to conquer the Mamluk Sultanate, which ruled in Syria and Egypt. Thus freed of other concerns, by 1516, the Ottoman Empire turned its full might against the Mamluks to complete the Ottoman conquest of the Middle East.

Sultan Selim alleged that the Mamluks were Muslim oppressors and that they were allied with the Shia Safavids. Based on these accusations, a fatwa appeared, stating: “Whoever helps people who are misled, he is also a heretic."

The Mamluks drafted farmers and peasants from rural areas as soldiers for their forthcoming war with the Ottomans. In response, these men fled to avoid being drafted. This led to shortages in rural workers required for food production and a shortage of bread, resulting in a near famine that devastated towns from Cairo to Anatolia.

Both the Ottomans and Mamluks assembled 60,000 soldiers. However, only 15,000 Mamluk soldiers were trained warriors: the rest were mere conscripts who did not even know how to fire a musket. As a result, most of the Mamluks fled, avoided the front lines, and even committed suicide. In addition, as had happened with the Safavids in the Battle of Chaldiran, the blasts of the Ottoman cannons and guns scared the Mamluk horses, which raced uncontrollably in every direction.

== Operations ==
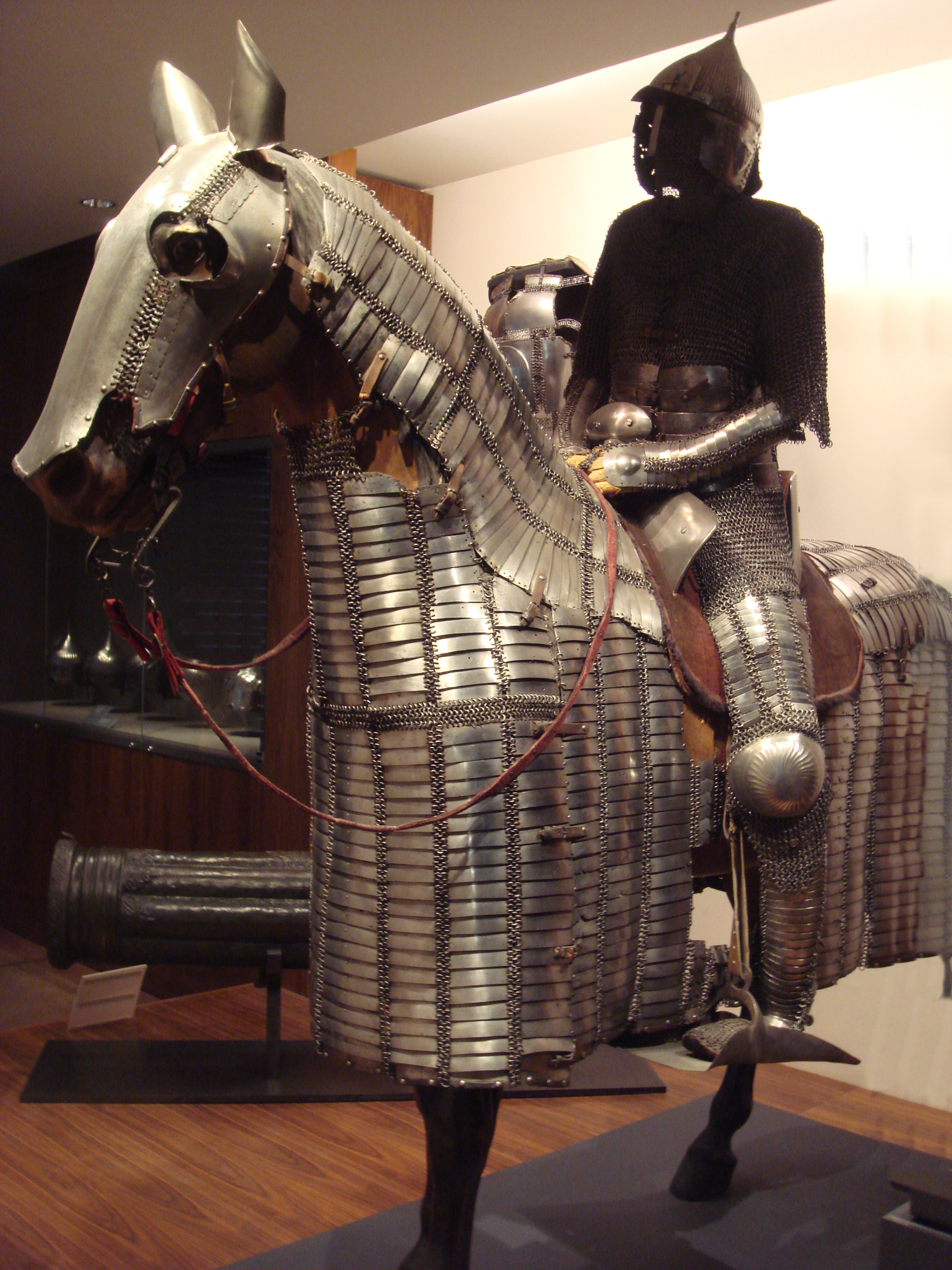
Ottoman Sipahi heavy cavalry, c. 1550. Musée de l'Armée

The Mamluk army was mainly made up of cavalry armed with bows and arrows, whereas the Ottoman army, and especially the Janissaries, used arquebuses. The Mamluks remained proud of their tradition and tended to disdain the usage of firearms.

=== Operations in the Levant (1516) ===
The Ottomans first captured the city of Diyarbekir in southeastern Anatolia. The Battle of Marj Dabiq (24 August) was decisive, and the Mamluk ruler Kansuh al-Ghuri was killed. The Ottomans apparently outnumbered the Mamluks by a factor of 3 to 1. Syria fell under the rule of the Ottomans with this single battle.

The Battle of Yaunis Khan occurred near Gaza (28 October) and was again a defeat for the Mamluks.

=== Operations in Egypt (1517) ===
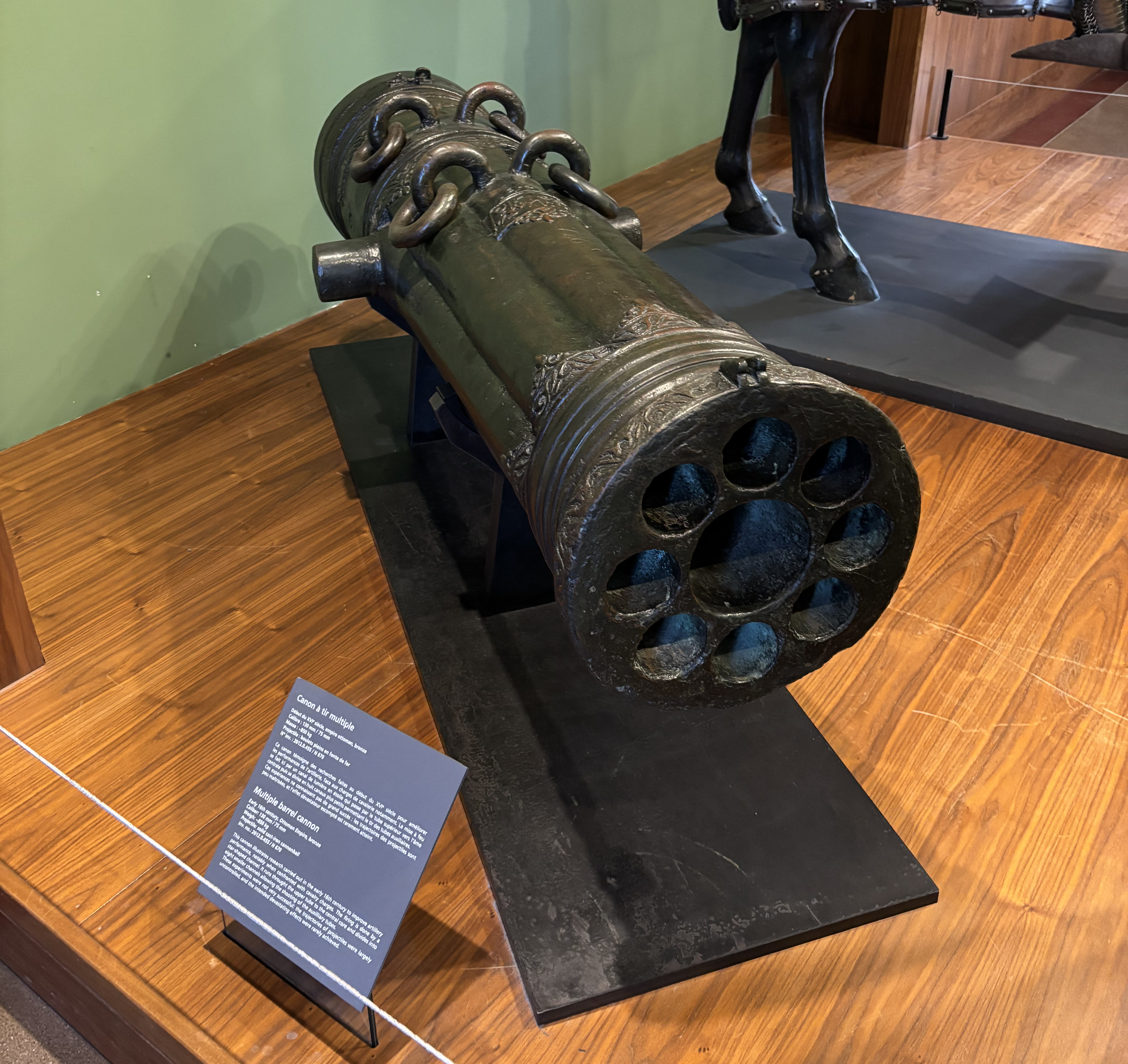
Ottoman volley gun with 9 barrels, early 16th century

Al-Ghuri's successor as Mamluk sultan, Tuman Bay, frantically recruited troops from various classes of society and Bedouins, and attempted to equip his armies with some quantity of cannons and firearms, but all at the last minute and on a limited scale. Finally, at the doorstep of Cairo, the Battle of Ridaniya (24 January) took place, in which the Ottoman commander Hadım Sinan Pasha lost his life. In this battle, Selim I and Tuman Bay faced each other. The firearms and guns deployed by Tuman Bay turned out to be almost useless, as the Ottomans managed an attack from the rear.

The campaign had been supported by a fleet of about 100 ships that supplied the troops during their campaign to the south.

A few days later, the Ottomans captured and sacked Cairo, capturing Caliph Al-Mutawakkil III. Tuman Bay regrouped his troops in Giza, where he was finally captured and hanged at the gate of Cairo.

=== Operations in the Red Sea (1517) ===
The Ottoman fleet of Selman Reis was already stationed in the Red Sea by 1517. Fearing Portuguese fleets the blockade on Bab Al Mandab to continue. Selman's fleets aimed to clash with the Portuguese to free the trade route with India and to protect the holy land of Hejaz. Despite the ongoing war with the Mamluks, the Ottomans defended Jeddah in December 1517, the last garrison of the Mamluk regime.

While Jeddah became a direct Beylerbeylik to the Ottoman Empire, eight years later, the Sharif of Mecca, Barakat ibn Muhammad, also submitted to the Ottomans, placing the holy cities of Mecca and Medina under Ottoman rule as a vassal state.

Consequently, Ottoman power was extended as far as the southern reaches of the Red Sea, although control of Yemen remained partial and sporadic.

== Results and aftermath ==
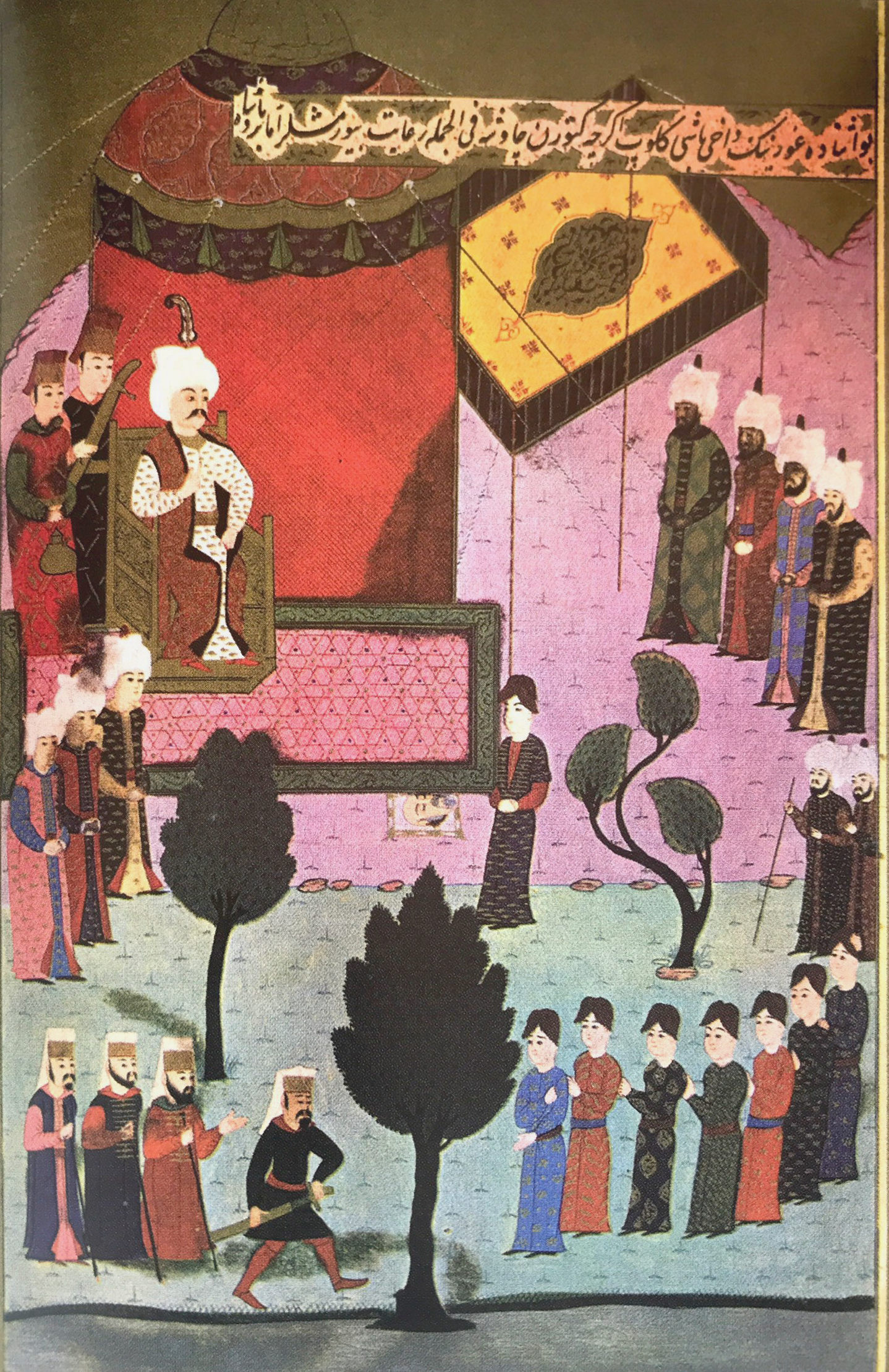
Ottoman painting showing the head of Mamluk Sultan al-Ghuri being remitted to Selim I

Mamluk culture and social organization persisted at a regional level, and the hiring and education of Mamluk "slave" soldiers continued, but the ruler of Egypt was an Ottoman governor protected by an Ottoman militia. The fall of the Mamluk Sultanate effectively put an end to the Portuguese–Mamluk naval war, but the Ottomans then took over the attempts to stop Portuguese expansion in the Indian Ocean.

The conquest of the Mamluk Empire also opened up the territories of Africa to the Ottomans. During the 16th century, Ottoman power expanded further west of Cairo, along the coasts of northern Africa. The corsair Hayreddin Barbarossa established a base in Algeria, and later accomplished the Conquest of Tunis in 1534.

Following his capture in Cairo, Caliph Al-Mutawakkil III was brought to Constantinople, where later tradition claims he ceded his office as caliph to the Ottomans. This established the Ottoman Caliphate, with the sultan as its head, thus transferring religious authority from Cairo to the Ottoman throne.

Cairo remained in Ottoman hands until the 1798 French conquest of Egypt, when Napoleon I claimed to eliminate the Mamluks.

The conquest of the Mamluks was the largest military venture any Ottoman Sultan had ever attempted. In addition, the conquest put the Ottomans in control of two of the largest cities in the world at the time- Constantinople and Cairo. Not since the height of the Roman Empire had the Black, Red, Caspian, and Mediterranean seas been governed by a single empire.

The conquest of Egypt proved extremely profitable for the empire as it produced more tax revenue than any other Ottoman territory and supplied about 100% of all food consumed. However, Mecca and Medina were the most important of all the cities conquered since it officially made Selim and his descendants the Caliphs of the entire Muslim world until the early 20th century.

== See also ==
- Ottoman–Mamluk War (1485–1491)
- Ottoman wars in Africa
- Ottoman wars in the Near East
- History of Ottoman Egypt
