= Battle of Yaunis Khan =

Battle during the Ottoman–Mamluk War of 1516–17

Coordinates: 31°31′N 34°27′E

- Part of the Ottoman–Mamluk War (1516–17)
Date	October 28, 1516
Location	Khan Yunis
Result	Ottoman victory

Belligerents
Ottoman Empire	Mamluk Sultanate; Bedouins

Commanders and leaders
Selim I Hadım Sinan Pasha	Janbirdi al-Ghazali (WIA)

Strength
4,000–6,000	Total 5,000: 500 Cülban; 1,500 Karanisa; 3,000 Bedouins; or 7,000: 2,500 Cülban; 3,000 Karanisa; 1,500 Bedouins; Or 7,000–10,000

Casualties and losses
1,000–2,000 killed	5,000–6,000 killed, 2,000–3,000 captured

The Battle of Yaunis Khan, also known as the Battle of Khan Yunis (Turkish: Han Yunus Muharebesi), was fought on October 28, 1516, between the Ottoman Empire and the Mamluk Sultanate. The Mamluk cavalry forces led by Janbirdi al-Ghazali attacked the Ottomans that were trying to cross Gaza on their way to Egypt. The Ottomans, led by Grand Vizier Hadım Sinan Pasha, were able to break the Egyptian Mamluk cavalry charge. Al-Ghazali was wounded during the confrontation, and the left-over Mamluk forces and their commander Al-Ghazali retreated to Cairo.

== Battle ==
After the battle of Marj Dabiq, the Ottoman army entered Aleppo on August 28, 1516, and Damascus on September 27-October 3. After this victory, Yavuz Sultan Selim sent İsabeyzade Mehmed Bey with 2,000 cavalry to Gaza. Ottoman troops captured Gaza on October 28, 1516.

In Cairo, Mamluk Sultan Tuman Bay II sent Janbirdi al-Ghazali with a force of 10,000 to Gaza. Many Mamluk beys also joined the expedition. In response to this force, a force of 5,000 soldiers under the command of Hadım Sinan Pasha met at Khan Yunus on December 21, 1516. In the battle that lasted 7–8 hours from morning to afternoon, the outcome was determined by the Ottomans' firepower, which held true for the battles of Chaldiran and Marj Dabiq. As a result of the battle, a significant portion of the Mamluk forces were killed and a significant portion was captured, including the Mamluk lords. Canberdi Ghazali was able to leave the battlefield with approximately 1,000 soldiers.
