= Yunus Pasha =

Grand Vizier of the Ottoman Empire (died 1517)

Devşirme Yunus Pasha
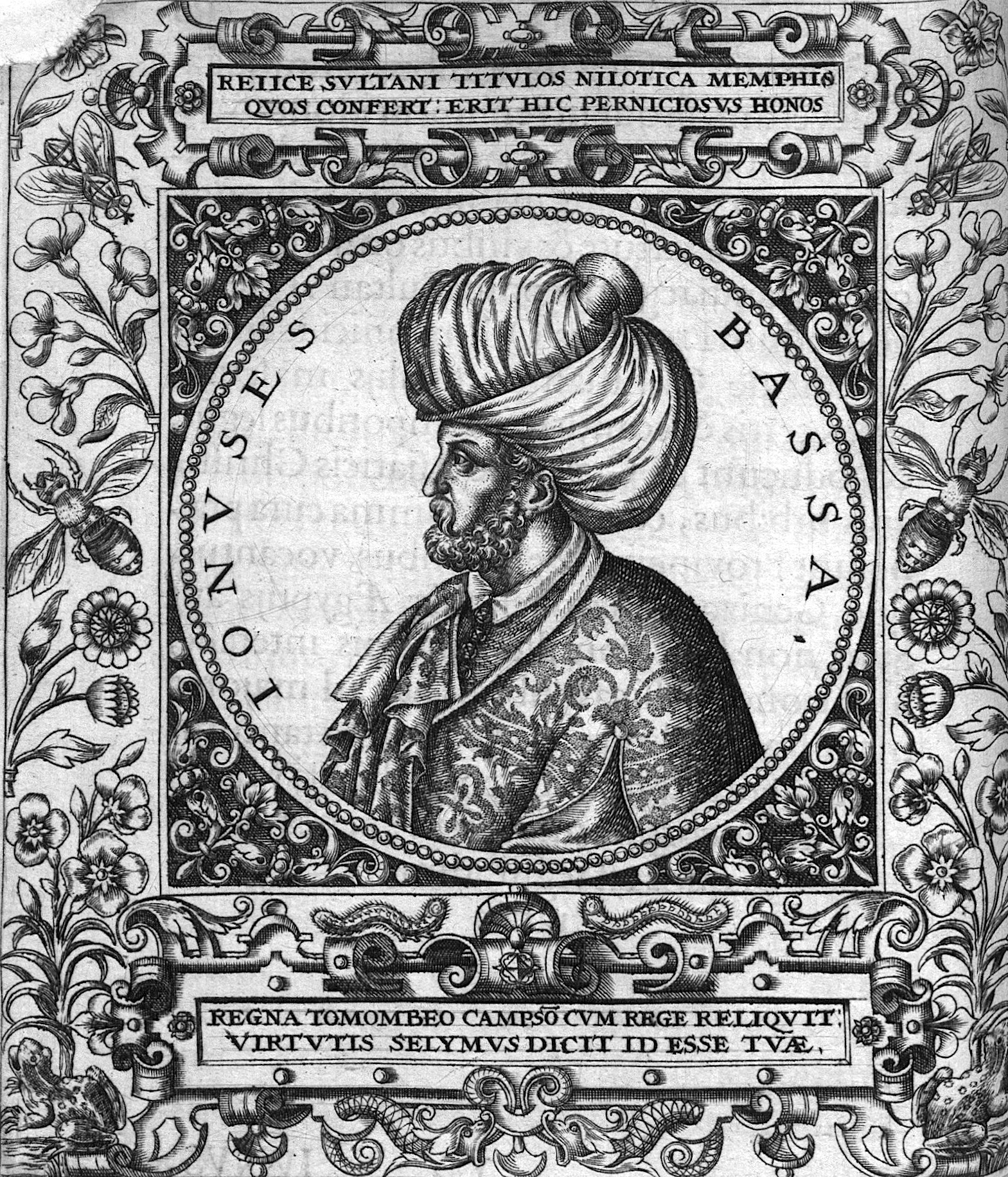

26th Grand Vizier of the Ottoman Empire
- In office 30 January 1517 – 13 September 1517
- Monarch: Selim I
- Preceded by: Hadım Sinan Pasha
- Succeeded by: Piri Mehmed Pasha

Ottoman Governor of Egypt
- In office 1517–1517
- Preceded by: Position established
- Succeeded by: Hayır Bey

Personal details
- Died: 13 September 1517 Tokat, Ottoman Empire
- Spouse: Aslıhan Hanımsultan

Yunus Pasha (Ottoman Turkish: يونس پاشا; Arabic: يونس باشا; died 13 September 1517) was an Ottoman statesman. He was Grand Vizier of the Ottoman Empire for eight months in 1517, serving from January 30 until his death on September 13.

== Biography ==
Yunus was of Albanian, Greek, Bulgarian or Croatian origin. He was taken into the devşirme system (taken from his family and converted to Islam in order to become an Ottoman bureaucrat/soldier) at a young age, Yunus was raised to become a Janissary, eventually becoming agha (top commander) of the Janissary corps. In 1511, he became a vizier in the divan (the Ottoman government) and the beylerbey (top provincial administrator) of the Anatolia Eyalet.

Yunus Pasha had a large role in the Ottoman–Mamluk War (1516–17). After the Ottoman victory in the Battle of Marj Dabiq in 1516, Yunus Pasha, with Ottoman troops under his command, mobilized his forces and entered the (modern Syrian) city of Aleppo, from there invading the cities of Hama, Homs, and Damascus in rapid succession. After the 1517 Battle of Ridaniya, he entered the Egyptian city of Cairo with his Janissary forces, and after a three-day siege, captured the city for the Ottoman Empire.

Because of his successes and the death of the previous grand vizier, Hadım Sinan Pasha, in combat during the Battle of Ridaniya on January 22, 1517, Yunus Pasha was appointed grand vizier eight days later, on January 30. Later, he was simultaneously appointed to be the governor of Egypt. After attaining these double positions, Yunus Pasha allegedly set up a syndicate of bribery and extortion. After the news of the corruption reached the sultan Selim I, Yunus Pasha's governorship was revoked and given to Hayır Bey, leaving Yunus Pasha with the sole office of grand vizier.

It is alleged that sultan Selim I had Yunus Pasha executed for insulting his governorship successor Hayır Bey's Circassian ethnicity after bitterness of losing his governorship to him despite Yunus Pasha being the one who had conquered Egypt for the Ottoman Empire. Whatever the reason, Yunus Pasha was executed by decapitation on September 13, 1517.

== Personal life ==
He was married in 1502 to Aslıhan Hanimsultan, daughter of Selçuk Sultan and granddaughter of Sultan Bayezid II.

== See also ==
- List of Ottoman grand viziers
- List of Ottoman governors of Egypt

Political offices
Preceded by Hadım Sinan Pasha	Grand Vizier of the Ottoman Empire; January 1517 – September 1517	Succeeded by Piri Mehmed Pasha
New creation Ottoman conquest of Egypt	Ottoman Governor of Egypt; 1517	Succeeded by Hayır Bey
