= João de Lisboa =

Portuguese explorer (c.1470 – 1525)

João de Lisboa (c.1470 – 1525) was a Portuguese explorer. He is known to have sailed together with Tristão da Cunha, and to have explored Río de La Plata and possibly the San Matias Gulf, around 1511–12. The Brazilian historian Francisco Adolfo de Varnhagen erroneously stated that he was in Ferdinand Magellan's circumnavigation voyage.

He is the author of a Treatise on the Nautical Needle, dated 1514, which is extant in a later copy included in an undated (ca. 1550?) Portuguese nautical atlas.

He died in 1525 while traveling in the Indian Ocean.

== Treatise of Seamanship ==
It is composed by the Brief Treatise on Seamanship and a "Treatise on the Nautical Needle found by João de Lisboa in the year 1514". Thereafter, an atlas of 20 charts follows.

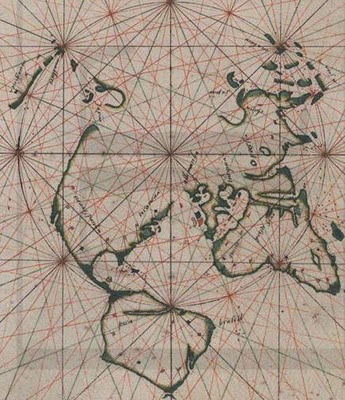
World map in the Treatise of Seamanship

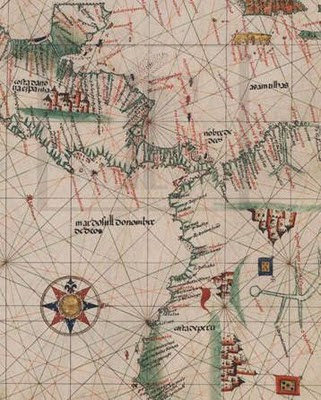
Portuguese flags in castles on Peru - Seamanship Treatise

The 20 charts present:

- Chart 1: Newfoundland, Azores, Iceland, England, Lisbon;
- Chart 2: Central America, Antilles Sea, South America northwest;
- Chart 3: Antilles Sea, South America coast from Maracaibo Gulf to Maranhão;
- Chart 4: South America coast, from Rio de Janeiro to the Magellan Strait, with La Plata River;
- Chart 5: Coast from Maranhão to the South of Brazil;
- Chart 6: From the Brazilian northeast to the west of Africa;
- Chart 7: South Atlantic islands;
- Chart 8: North Atlantic, with Bacallaos Land (Newfoundland), Iceland, England, Lisbon;
- Chart 9: Western Europe
- Chart 10: West Africa and Brazilian Northeast.
- Chart 11: Guinea Gulf;
- Chart 12: Western Africa;
- Chart 13: Eastern Africa;
- Chart 14: Southwest islands in the Indian Ocean;
- Chart 15: Red Sea and Persian Gulf;
- Chart 16: From Persian Gulf coast to Sri Lanka;
- Chart 17: Far East from the Siamese Gulf to Japan;
- Chart 18: Bengala Gulf;
- Chart 19: Insulindia;
- Chart 20: Globe of the world - radial representation centered at the North Pole;

The book can be found in Torre do Tombo National Archive (Colecção Cartográfica nº166), with an additional information that the maps are made of parchment.

The maps of the Tratado clearly date from after 1514. For instance, it shows the Magellan Strait or Japan (which was only reported by the Portuguese in 1543). On the other hand, the position of certain Portuguese flags is not consistent with historical events; in particular in one of the charts, Portuguese castles are drawn in Inca territory, something that was never reported in any official document. Based on the presence of Japan, Armando Cortesão dated the atlas as "circa 1560", while other authors date it to "circa 1550".

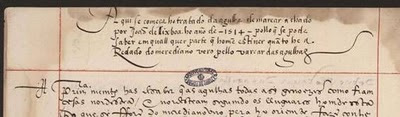
Seamanship Treatise - where it is written "found by João de Lisboa in the year 1514"
