= Tuman Bay II =

Mamluk Sultan of Egypt

Al-Ashraf Tuman Bay الأشرف طومان باي
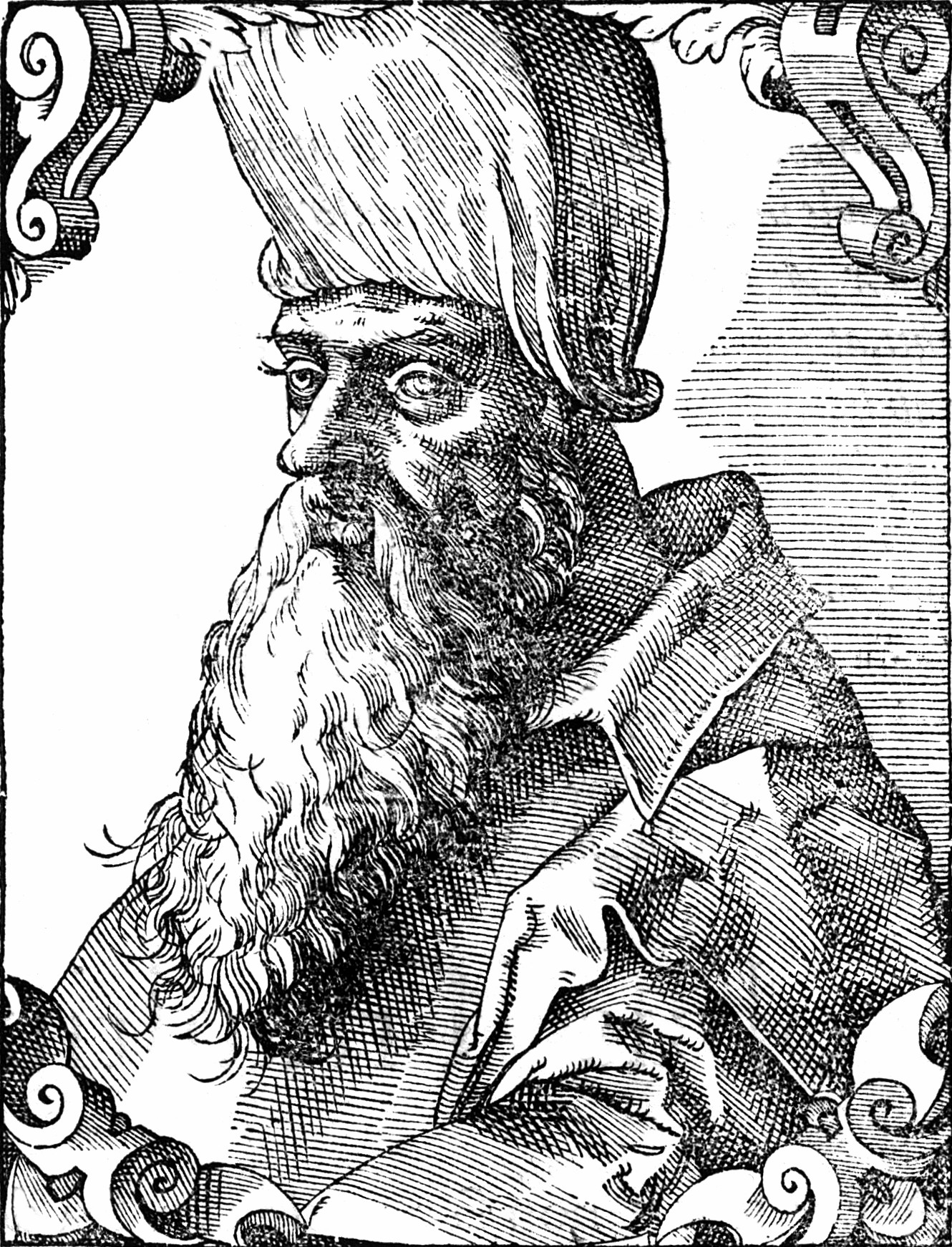
- Portrait of Tuman bay II by Paolo Giovio

Sultan of Egypt
- Reign: 17 October 1516 – 15 April 1517
- Coronation: 1516 Cairo
- Predecessor: Al-Ashraf Qansuh al-Ghawri
- Successor: Yunus Pasha (As Ottoman Wālis of Egypt)
- Born: c. 1476
- Died: 1517; Cairo Egypt
- Burial: Sultan al-Ghuri Complex, Cairo
- Spouse: Khawand Aisha
- House: Burji Dynasty
- Religion: Sunni Islam

Al-Ashraf Abu Al-Nasr Tuman Bay (Arabic: الأشرف أبو النصر طومان باي), better known as Tuman Bay II and Tumanbay II (طومان باي; c. 1476 – 15 April 1517) was the Mamluk Sultan of Egypt before the country's conquest by the Ottoman Empire in 1517. He ascended to the sultanic throne during the final period of Mamluk rule in Egypt, after the defeat of Sultan Al-Ashraf Qansuh al-Ghawri by Ottoman Sultan Selim I at the Battle of Marj Dabiq the year prior. He was the last person to hold the title of Sultan of Egypt until the re-establishment of the sultanate 397 years later under Hussein Kamel in 1914.

A Circassian who like his predecessors, had been a domestic slave of the palace, Tuman gradually rose to the position of prime minister, an office he held until the departure of Sultan Al-Ashraf Qansuh al-Ghawri, who left him in charge of Cairo. His rise to power was clouded by conflict in Syria, disordered troops, distracted emirs, and a mercenary horde of Mamluks.

== Name ==
Al-Ashraf (Arabic: الأشرف) is an Arabic title meaning the honorable; Abu Al-Nasr (Arabic: أبو النصر) means who brings victory; Tuman (Turkic: tümen) means ten thousand; and Bay is a Turkic title meaning chief. Tuman Bay literally means chief of 10,000 (soldiers) in Turkic.

== Gaza campaign of 1516 ==
By December of 1516, Tripoli, Safed and other Syrian strongholds, besides Damascus, had fallen into Ottoman hands, leading Emir Janberdi Al-Ghazali to set out with a force gathered in Cairo in hopes of preventing Gaza from the same. Before they reached their destination, however, Gaza had already fallen and the army was beaten back. During Al-Ghazali’s absence, diplomats arrived with a dispatch from Selim who demanded that the Sultan formally acknowledge his supremacy, both in the coinage and the public prayers, supposedly stating;

Do this and Egypt shall remain untouched; else swiftly I come to destroy you, and your Mamluks with you, from off the face of the earth.

Though Selim’s envoy and his entourage were treated with hostility in the city, Sultan Tuman was inclined to fall in with the Selim's demand, but his emirs overcame his better judgment and the Ottoman messengers were put to death. Terror then pervaded Cairo, and the treachery of Khayr Bay and many other emirs made the prospect all the darker. Massacres were conducted in Gaza after its inhabitants, on a false report of Egyptian victory, attacked the Turkish garrison. The news of Al-Ghazali's discomfiture deteriorated the situation further, as he attributed the defeat not only to the numbers of the enemy but to the cowardice of his mercenary followers, while even his loyalty began to be suspected.

== Battle of Ridanieh ==
Sultan Tuman now resolved himself to march out as far as Salahia, and meet with the Turks, weary by the desert journey, but yielded to his emirs who entrenched themselves at Ridanieh, a little way out of the city. By this time, the Ottomans, having reached Arish, were marching unopposed by Salahia and Bilbeis to Khanqah; and on January 20 reached Birkat al-Hajj, a few hours from the capital. Two days later the main body confronted the Sultan’s Egyptian entrenchment; while another party that was crossing the Mocattam Hill took them on the flank. The Battle of Ridanieh was fought January 22, 1517.

Sultan Tuman fought along with a band of devoted followers; he threw himself into the midst of the Turkish ranks and reached even to Selim's tent. But in the end, the Egyptians were routed and retreated two miles (3km) up the Nile. The Ottomans then entered Cairo unopposed. They took the Citadel there and slew the entire Circassian garrison, while chaos reigned in the streets. Selim himself occupied Gezira Island (الجزيرة الوسطانية), close to Bulaq. The following day his vizier entered the city, and endeavored to stop the wild rapine of the Turkish troops; and the Caliph Al-Mutawakkil III, who had followed in Selim's train, led the public service invoking blessing on his name. The Caliph's prayer is thus given by Ibn Ayas;

O Lord, uphold the Sultan, monarch both of land and the two seas; conqueror of both hosts; king of both Iraqs; minister of both holy cities; the great prince Selim Shah! Grant him your heavenly aid and glorious victories! O king of the present and the future, Lord of the Universe!

Still plunder and riot went on. The Turks seized all they could lay hold of and demanded their captives pay large ransoms to escape death. Circassians were pursued and slaughtered, their heads being hung up around the battlefield. It was not till some days had passed that Selim’s presence in the city, along with the Caliph, whose appeal for mercy began to be felt, put an end to the hostilities, and the inhabitants began to feel some measure of security again.

The following night, Sultan Tuman reappeared in Cairo and with his Bedouin allies took possession of the weakly garrisoned city, and at daylight they drove back the Ottomans with great loss. The approaches were entrenched, and the Friday service once more solemnized in the name of the Egyptian Sultan. But at midnight the Turkish invaders again returned with overpowering force and scattered the Mamluks into their hiding places, while the Sultan fled across the Nile to Giza, and eventually found refuge in Upper Egypt.

Selim returned to Gezira and hoisted a red-and-white flag in token of amnesty over his tent. The Mamluks, however, were excluded from it. A proclamation was made that anyone sheltering them would be put to death, and 800 were then discovered and beheaded. Many citizens were spared at the entreaty of the Caliph, who now occupied a more prominent place than ever under the Egyptian Sultanate. The son of Sultan Al-Ashraf Qansuh al-Ghawri was received with distinction and granted the college founded by his father as a dwelling place.

Soon after the initial amnesty, even the hidden emirs were given the chance to come forward and face Selim's wrath. However, they were not allowed to roam free and were instead placed in cells in the Citadel. Emir Janberdi Al-Ghazali, who had fought at the Battle of Ridanieh, cast himself at Selim's feet, was received with honor and even given a command to fight against the Bedouins. There is a great diversity of opinion as to when Janberdi, either openly or by collusion, took the Turkish side. The presumption is that he was faithful to the Sultan up to the Battle of Ridanieh, and then deeming the cause hopeless retired and went over to the Ottomans about the end of January. Having strongly garrisoned the Citadel, Selim now took up his residence there, and for security had a detachment quartered at the foot of the great entrance gate.

== Guerrilla campaign from Giza ==
Sultan Tuman had again assumed the offensive. With Mamluks and Bedouins, he had taken up a threatening attitude there, and stopped the supplies from Upper Egypt. Eventually wearied by the continued struggle however, he made advances and offered to recognize Selim’s supremacy if the invaders would retire. Selim commissioned the Caliph Al-Mutawakkil III with four qadis to accompany a Turkish delegation for the purpose of arranging terms, but the Caliph, disliking the duty, sent his deputy instead. When Tuman heard the conditions offered, he was willing to accept them, but his emirs overruled him. Distrusting of the Ottoman sultan, they slew the Turkish members of the embassy with one of the qadis, and thus stopped negotiations. Selim executed 57 imprisoned Egyptian emirs in response.

Sultan Tuman who still had a considerable following now returned to Giza. Selim, finding difficulty in the passage of his troops, was obliged to build a bridge of boats across the Nile. Tuman gathered his forces under the Pyramids of Giza, and there, towards the end of March, the two armies met. Though supported by his General Shadi Bay he was, after two days of fighting, beaten and sought refuge with a Bedouin chief whose life he once saved, but who now betrayed him into Turkish hands. He was carried in fetters into Selim's presence, who chastised him for his obstinate hostility and the murder of his messengers.

== Capture and death ==
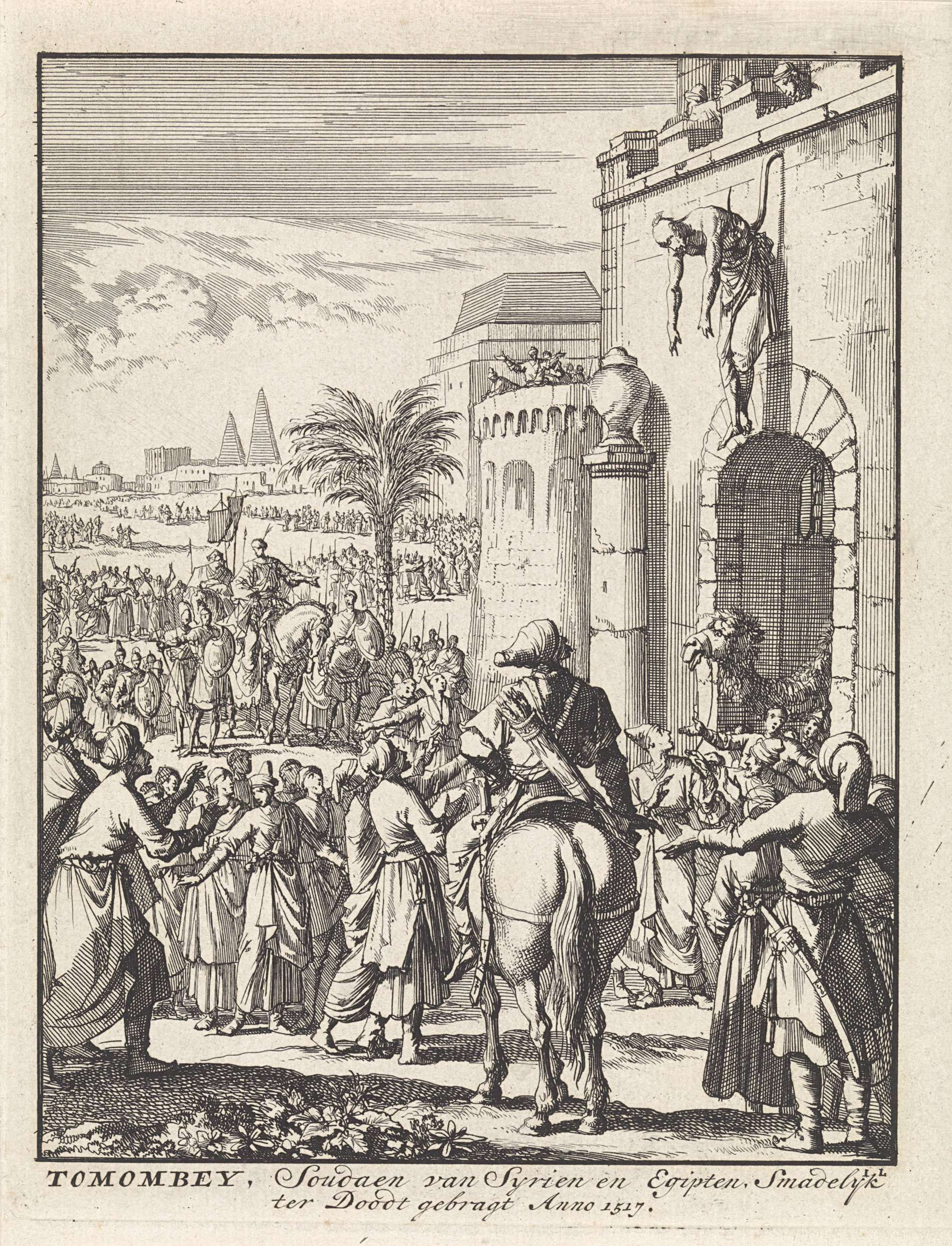
Execution of Tuman Bay II (etching by Jan Luyken)

The captive Sultan held a noble front, denying complicity in the assassination, and speaking out so fearlessly on the justice of his cause and duty to fight for the honor and independence of his people, that Selim was inclined to spare him and carry him in his train to Constantinople. But Khayr Bay, and even Janberdi Al-Ghazali, urged that so long as he survived, the Ottoman rule would be in jeopardy. The argument was persuasive and so the unfortunate Tuman Bay II was cast into prison and shortly after hanged as a malefactor at Bab Zuweila on April 15, 1517. The body remained suspended for three days before it was buried. Shadi Bay was executed as well.

The death of Tuman created such a sensation that an attempt was made by an emir and a body of devoted followers to assassinate Sultan Selim by night. However, the palace guard was on the alert, and the desperate design did not succeed. Tuman Bay II, forty years of age, had reigned for only three months and a half. He left no family; only his widow, a daughter of Akbercly, who was captured and tortured.

With the death of Tuman Bay II, the Mamluk dynasty came to its end. The Sultanate was re-established later, but with a different dynasty known as the Muhammad Ali dynasty

After his death, the body of the last Sultan of Egypt was buried in the Sultan al-Ghuri Complex in Cairo.

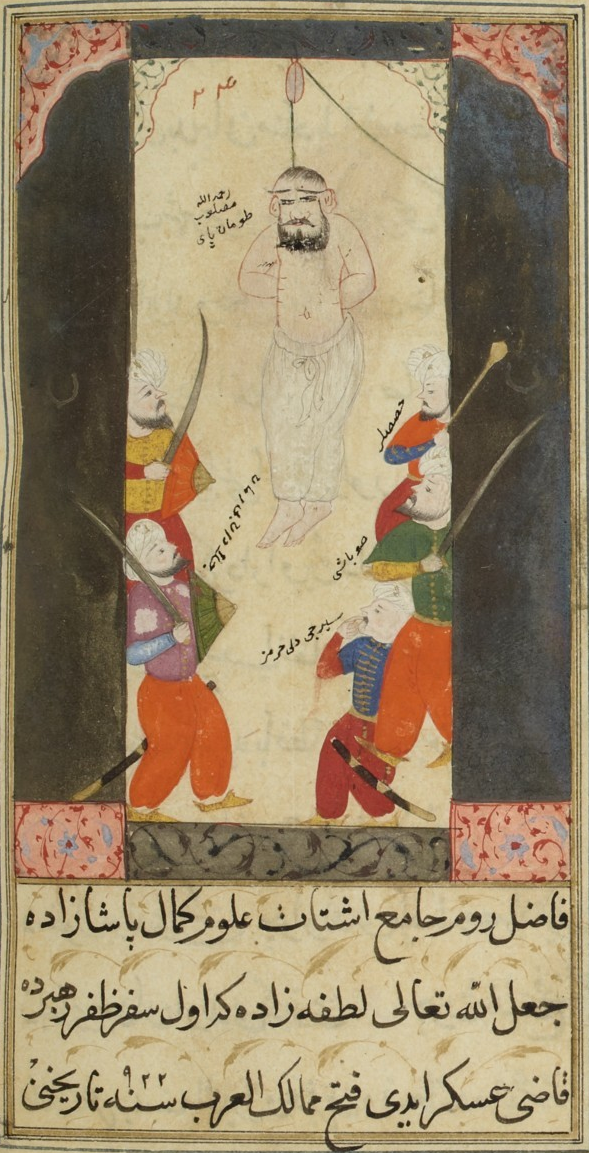
Execution of Tuman bay in an Ottoman miniature from Taj al-Tewarih by Hoja Sa'd al-Din

== In popular culture ==
A fictionalized version of his rise, in the context of the Mamluks' competition against the Ottomans over the control of the Middle East, serves as the basis for the TV series Kingdoms of Fire, in which he was portrayed by Khaled El Nabawy.

Several streets in Egypt have been named after Al-Ashraf Tuman Bay to honor him, most notably Tuman Bay Street in the Zeitoun district of Cairo.

Regnal titles
Preceded by Qansuh al-Ghawri	Mamluk Sultan of Egypt; 1516–1517	Ottoman conquest of Egypt
