= Hüseyin Pasha =

Hüseyin Pasha or Husayn Pasha may refer to:

- Hüseyin Pasha Boljanić (died 1594/5), Ottoman governor of Bosnia, Damascus (1582–1583), and Egypt (1573–1574)
- Hüseyin Pasha (d. 1600), Ottoman governor of Abyssinia (1568–1570), rebel
- Ohrili Hüseyin Pasha (died 1622), Ottoman grand vizier (1621)
- Mere Hüseyin Pasha (died 1624), Ottoman grand vizier (1622, 1623)
- Gazi Hüseyin Pasha (died 1659), Ottoman grand vizier (1656) and Kapudan Pasha (grand admiral)
- Husayn Pasha (died 1663), Ottoman governor of Gaza Sanjak
- Husayn Pasha ibn Makki (d. 1783), Ottoman governor of Damascus Eyalet, Marash Eyalet and Gaza Sanjak
- Mezzo Morto Hüseyin Pasha (died 1701), Ottoman corsair, bey, and Kapudan Pasha (grand admiral) of the Ottoman Navy
- Amcazade Köprülü Hüseyin Pasha (1644–1702), Ottoman grand vizier (1697–1702)
- Hüseyin Avni Pasha (1820–1876), Ottoman grand vizier (1874–1875)
- Hüseyin Tevfik Pasha (1832–1901), Ottoman military adjutant and author of Linear Algebra (1882, 1892)
- Hüseyin Hilmi Pasha (1855–1922), Ottoman grand vizier (1909)
- Hüseyin Zekai Pasha (1860–1919), Ottoman Turkish painter
