= Battle of Ridaniya =

Part of the Mamluk–Ottoman war (1516–1517)

- Part of the Mamluk-Ottoman War (1516–1517)
Date	January 22, 1517
Location	Ridanieh, present-day Egypt
Result	Ottoman victory; Collapse of the Mamluk Sultanate

Belligerents
Ottoman Empire	Mamluk Sultanate

Commanders and leaders
(Ottoman Empire) Sultan Selim I (Ottoman Empire) Hadım Sinan Pasha †	Sultan Tuman Bay II; Janbirdi al-Ghazali; Shadi Baig †

Strength
(Ottoman Empire) 20,000	20,000

Casualties and losses
(Ottoman Empire) 6,000	7,000

The Battle of Ridaniya or Battle of Ridanieh (Arabic: معركة الريدانية; Turkish: Ridaniye Muharebesi) was fought on January 22, 1517, in Egypt. The Ottoman forces of Selim I defeated the Mamluk forces under Al-Ashraf Tuman bay II. The Turks marched into Cairo, and the severed head of Tuman bay II, Egypt’s last Mamluk Sultan, was hung over an entrance gate in the Al Ghourieh quarter of Cairo. Or, alternatively, he was hung from the gate and buried after three days. The Ottoman grand vizier, Hadım Sinan Pasha, was killed in action.

== Description of the battle ==
Sultan Tuman bay II now resolved himself to march out as far as Salahia, and there meet the Turks wearied by the desert march; however, at the last he yielded to his Emirs who entrenched themselves at Ridanieh a little way out of the city. By this time, the Ottomans were crossing the Sinai Peninsula and having reached Arish, were marching unopposed by Salahia and Bilbeis to Khanqah; on January 20 they reached Birkat al Hajj, a few hours from Cairo, the Mamluk Sultanate's capital. Two days later the main body confronted the Egyptian entrenchment, while a party crossing Mocattam Hill took them in the flank. The Battle of Ridanieh was fought January 22, 1517. With a band of devoted followers, Tuman threw himself into the midst of the Ottoman ranks, and even reached Sinan Pasha's tent and personally killed him, thinking he was Selim. But in the end the Egyptians were routed, and fled two miles up the Nile. The Ottomans then entered the City of Cairo unopposed. They took the Citadel and slew the entire Circassian garrison, while all around the streets became the scene of terrible outrage. Selim I himself occupied an island close to Bulac. The following day his Vizier, entering the city, endeavored to stop the wild rapine of the troops; and the Caliph Al-Mutawakkil III, who had followed in Selim's train, led the public service invoking blessing on his name. The Caliph's prayer as given by Ibn Ayas.

O Lord, uphold the Sultan, Monarch both of land and the two Seas; Conqueror of both Hosts; King of both Iracs [sic]; Minister of both Holy cities; the great Prince Selim Shah! Grant him Thy heavenly aid and glorious victories ! O King of the present and the future, Lord of the Universe!

Still plunder and riot went on. The Turks seized all they could lay hold of, and threatened death unless on payment of large ransom. The Circassian were everywhere pursued and mercilessly slaughtered, their heads being hung up around the battle field. It was not till some days had passed, that Selim I with Caliph Al-Mutawakkil III, whose influence for mercy began now to be felt, having entered the city stopped these wild hostilities, and the inhabitants began again to feel some measure of security.

The following night, Tuman reappeared and with his Bedouin allies took possession of the weakly garrisoned city, and at daylight drove back the Ottomans with great loss. The approaches were entrenched, and the Friday service once more solemnized in name of the Egyptian Sultan. But at midnight the enemy again returned in overpowering force, scattered the Mamluks into their hiding-places, while the Sultan fled across the Nile to Giza, and eventually found refuge in Upper Egypt.

Satisfied with this victory, Selim I returning again to his island had a red and white flag in token of amnesty hoisted over his tent. The Mamluks, however, were excluded from it. They were ruthlessly pursued, proclamation made that any sheltering them would be put to death, and 800 thus discovered were beheaded. Many citizens were spared at the entreaty of the Caliph, who now occupied a more prominent place than ever under the Egyptian Sultanate. The son of Sultan Al-Ashraf Qansuh al-Ghawri was received with distinction and granted the College founded by the Sultan his father as a dwelling-place.

Soon after, the amnesty was extended to all the hidden Emirs, who as they appeared were upbraided by Selim I, and then distributed in cells throughout the Citadel. Emir Janbirdi al-Ghazali who fought bravely at the Battle of Ridanieh, but now cast himself at Selim's feet, was alone received with honor and even given a command to fight against the Bedouins. There is a great diversity of opinion as to when Janbirdi either openly or by collusion took the Ottoman side. The presumption is that he was faithful up to the Battle of Ridanieh, and then seeing the cause hopeless retired and went over to the Ottomans about the end of January. Having strongly garrisoned the Citadel, Selim I now took up his residence there, and for security had a detachment quartered at the foot of the great entrance gate.

== Bibliography ==
- Nicolle, David (1993) The Mamluks 1250–1517. Opsrey Publishing. ISBN 1-85532-314-1
