= Hayır Bey =

Governor of Egypt from 1517 to 1522

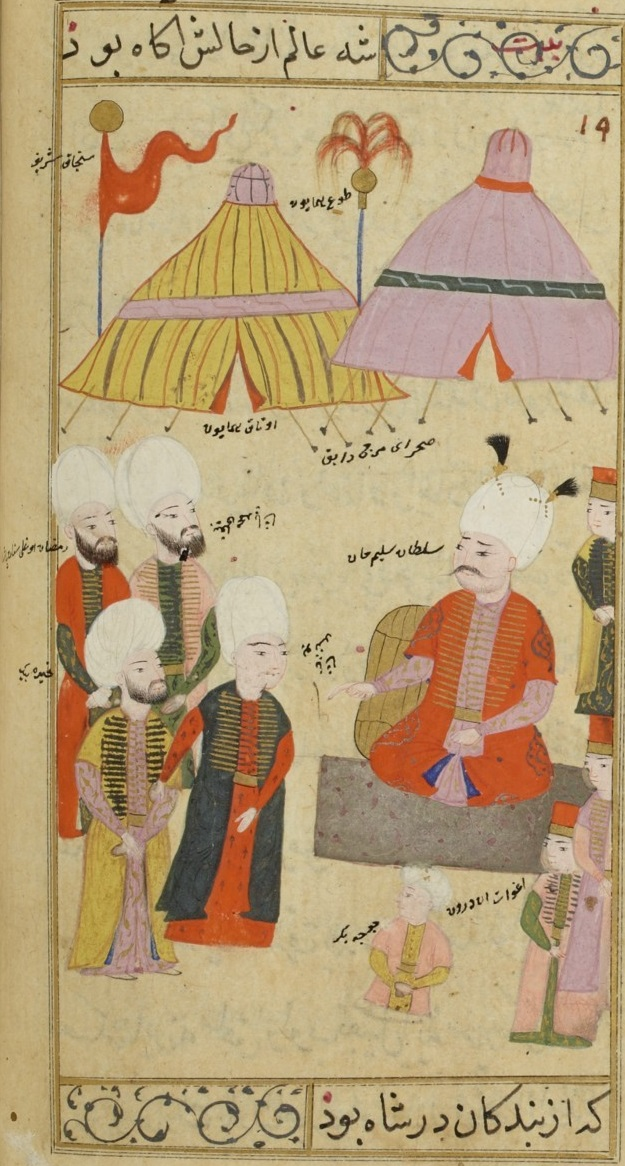

Hayır Bey (sometimes spelled Kha'ir Bey or Kha'ir Beg) or Khayrbak (1464 – 1522) ruled Egypt in the name of the Ottoman Empire from 1517 until his death in 1522. He was granted the position of governor by sultan Selim I of the Ottoman Empire for his help in the conquest of Egypt.

Being of Abkhazian origin, he was the former Mamluk governor of Aleppo who contributed to the Ottoman victory at the Battle of Marj Dabiq. After the Ottoman conquest of the Mamluks and the end of the Mamluk Sultanate, the grand vizier Yunus Pasha was made the governor of Egypt. However, after Ottoman sultan Selim I found out about Yunus Pasha's corruption in governing, consisting of bribery and extortion, Hayır Bey was entrusted with the governorship of Egypt.

His residence was the Amir Alin Aq Palace and he built the Amir Khayrbak Funerary Complex.

He married Miṣirbāy (d. 1522), widow of sultan An-Nasir Muhammad ibn Qaitbay (r. 1496-1498) and sultan Abu Sa'id Qansuh (r. 1498-1500); according to contemporary sources, he hit her so severely that she almost died, and the couple separated.

== See also ==
- List of Ottoman governors of Egypt
- Battle of Marj Dabiq
- Ottoman conquest of the Middle East

Political offices
| Preceded by Yunus Pasha | Ottoman Governor of Egypt; 1517–1522 | Succeeded by Çoban Mustafa Pasha |
