= Hadım Sinan Pasha =

Grand Vizier of the Ottoman Empire from 1516 to 1517

Hadım Sinan Borovinić Pasha

25th Grand Vizier of the Ottoman Empire
- In office 26 April 1516 – 22 January 1517
- Monarch: Selim I
- Preceded by: Hersekzade Ahmed Pasha
- Succeeded by: Yunus Pasha

Personal details
- Born: Borovinići, Foča
- Died: 22 January 1517 Ridaniya, Egypt
- Spouse: Gevherhan Hatun (disputed)

Military service
- Battles/wars: Ottoman–Mamluk War; Battle of Chaldiran; Battle of Marj Dabiq; Battle of Yaunis Khan; Battle of Ridaniya †

Hadım Sinan Pasha (Ottoman Turkish: خادم سنان پاشا, Turkish: Hadım Sinan Paşa, lit. 'Sinan Pasha the Eunuch'; Serbo-Croatian: Sinan-paša Borovinić; died 22 January 1517) was a Bosnian-Ottoman nobleman, politician and statesman. He served as the Grand Vizier of the Ottoman Empire from 1516 to 1517.

== Life ==
=== Early life ===
Sinan Pasha was of Bosnian descent. According to Ragusan documents the Borovinić noble family were from Borovinići village near Foča. His ancestor Tvrtko Borovinić (fl. 1417–46) was a close relative of Radoslav Pavlović, the Grand Duke of Bosnia, whom he served as a vassal.

=== Sanjak-bey ===
From December 1496 he was sanjak-bey of Bosnia. From 1504 to 1506, he was the sanjak-bey of Herzegovina. In 1507–08 he expanded the Mostar mosque built in 1473 by an earlier Sinan Pasha who was the first sanjak-bey of Herzegovina. Later he served as the sanjak-bey of Smederevo between 1506 and 1513.

=== Beylerbey and Grand Vizier ===
In 1514, he was the Beylerbey (governor-general) of Anatolia. In the Battle of Chaldiran against Safavid Iran he was in charge of the right flank. After the battle he was appointed as the beylerbey of Rumelia, a post more prestigious than his former post. His next mission was the conquest of the Dulkadirids, a vassal of the Mamluk Sultanate, in what is now South Turkey. He defeated Bozkurt of Dulkadir in the Battle of Turnadağ. After the conquest of the beylik, Selim I (the Inflexible) appointed him as the Grand Vizier on April 25, 1516. Sinan was Selim's favorite grand vizier. He was active in the conquest of Syria and Egypt, which were then provinces of the Mamluk Sultanate. He defeated and subdued the independent Kurdish emirate of Baban, making them an Ottoman vassal. On October 28, 1516, he defeated an Egyptian Mamluk army in Khan Yunis, near Gaza, Palestine. Next year, he fought in the Battle of Ridaniya in Egypt on January 22, 1517. In Ottoman battle tradition, the sultan was almost always in the central headquarters. But the Battle of Ridaniya was an exception, because Selim I decided to encircle the Mamluks personally and assigned Sinan to the central headquarters. The plot was successful and the Mamluks were defeated. However, before the battle was over, Mamluk cavalry (including Tuman bay II, the Egyptian sultan) raided the Ottoman headquarters and killed Sinan, thinking he was the sultan. After the battle, Sultan Selim expressed his sorrow, saying, "We won the battle, but we lost Sinan."

== Personal life ==
According to some sources, Sinan was married to the full-sister of Sultan Bayezid II. It has been speculated that this sister was Gevherhan Hatun, Bayezid's only known full sister. Some historians have disputed this, arguing that Sinan may also have married one of Bayezid's half-sisters, or that Bayezid had an unknown second full-sister.

== See also ==
- List of Ottoman grand viziers

Political offices
Preceded by Hersekzade Ahmed Pasha	Grand Vizier of the Ottoman Empire; 26 April 1516 – 22 January 1517	Succeeded by Yunus Pasha
