= Janbirdi al-Ghazali =

Early 16th century Ottoman governor

Janbirdi al-Ghazali جان بردي الغزالي
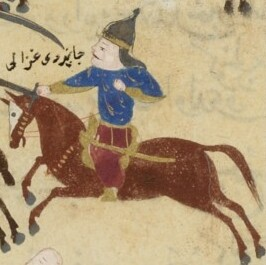
- Janbirdi al-Ghazali in a miniature from Hoja Sa'd al-Din's Taj al-Tewarih

Ottoman Governor of Damascus
- In office 1519–1521
- Preceded by: vacant
- Succeeded by: Ayas Mehmed Pasha

Personal details
- Died: 1521 Damascus, Ottoman Syria

Military service
- Battles/wars: Battle of Marj Dabiq; Battle of Beirut (1520); Canberdi Ghazâlî Revolt

Janbirdi al-Ghazali (Arabic: جان بردي الغزالي, romanized: Jān-Birdi al-Ghazāli; (Note: Ottoman Turkish: جانبیردی غزالی) died 1521) was the first governor of Damascus Province under the Ottoman Empire from February 1519 until his death in February 1521.

== Career ==
=== Viceroy of Hama and Governor of Damascus ===
Al-Ghazali was originally the na'ib or "viceroy" of Hama under the Mamluk Sultanate of Egypt in the early 16th century. When the Ottomans invaded Mamluk Syria, Janbirdi fought alongside the latter at the Battle of Marj Dabiq in 1516, leading the assault on Ottoman sultan Selim I's army in Gaza. Al-Ghazali was wounded during that confrontation. After the Mamluk defeat, he retreated to Cairo with his army where he took part in the defense of the city from incoming Ottoman forces. The Ottomans again defeated the Mamluks and conquered Egypt and Syria.

Al-Ghazali then joined the Mamluk governor of Aleppo in defecting to the Ottomans and severed allegiance with Mamluk sultan Qansuh al-Ghawri. Selim I was reportedly impressed by al-Ghazali's loyalty to his superiors and in a bid to have him serve under the Ottomans, Selim appointed him as governor of Damascus in February 1519. At the time, Damascus Province encompassed much of the Levant, including much of central and southern Syria, the Syrian coastline, Palestine, Transjordan and Lebanon. He paid an annual tribute of 230,000 dinars to the Ottoman sultan.

As governor, he was in charge of safeguarding the pilgrim caravan destined to make hajj in the Hejaz for the pilgrim route from Damascus to Aqaba in southern Transjordan. In order to do this successfully, he subjugated the Turkmen nomads in the area. After two years, he managed to have those same Turkmen tribes protecting the pilgrims. By 1520, hajj caravans were traveling without incident. In line with Ottoman state policy at the time, al-Ghazali embarked on major development projects in Damascus. Having been appointed the nazir or "supervisor" of Damascus's main waqf, he had the Umayyad Mosque repaired and redecorated. He also had a number of other mosques, schools and canals rebuilt and repaired. Supervisors of madrasas ("religious schools") who were deemed negligent were stripped of their position and their school buildings restored.

=== Revolt against the Ottomans ===
Following the succession of Süleyman the Magnificent to the sultanate after Selim's death in 1520, al-Ghazali revolted against the Ottoman state. He sought to restore Mamluk suzerainty, declaring himself "sultan" or al-Malik al-Ashraf ("the most noble king"). He banned preachers in mosques from upholding the Ottoman sultan's name in Friday prayers, purged Ottoman officials and soldiers from Syria, and banned Ottoman dress by the province's citizens. After he declared himself sultan, the cities of Tripoli, Hama, and Hims joined his rebellion. After failed attempts to enlist the support of Shah Ismail of the Safavid Empire and Kha'ir Bey, the Ottoman governor of Egypt, he nonetheless raised an army and set out to conquer Aleppo. The residents of Aleppo supported the Ottoman sultanate, however, and resisted al-Ghazali's efforts. His army besieged the city for 15 days, during which over 200 residents and Ottoman soldiers were killed, but to no avail. He withdrew to Damascus soon after to rally his forces.

In February 1521, the Ottoman Army arrived at the outskirts of Damascus where al-Ghazali's troops confronted them. His army was swiftly defeated and he was executed. The Ottoman army sent al-Ghazali's severed head to Süleyman as a trophy. The Ottomans also proceeded to sack Damascus, killing 3,000 residents, and destroying the town quarters as well as nearby villages. With the deposition of al-Ghazali's revolt, Mamluk influence in Syria came to an end. The Ottoman contemporary chroniclers report al-Ghazali's revolt as the first major event of the reign of Suleiman the Magnificent.

== See also ==
- List of Ottoman governors of Egypt

== Bibliography ==
- Rogan, E. (2009). The Arabs: A History. Basic Books. ISBN 978-0-465-07100-5.
- Spuler, Bertold; Bagley, F. R. C.; Kissling, H. J. (1997). The Last Great Muslim Empires. BRILL. ISBN 90-04-02104-3.
- Peters, F. E. (1995). The Hajj: the Muslim pilgrimage to Mecca and the holy places. Princeton University Press. p. 147. ISBN 0-691-02619-X. "Janbirdi Ghazali."
- Van Leeuwen, Richard (1999). Waqfs and urban structures: the case of Ottoman Damascus. BRILL. ISBN 90-04-11299-5.
- Hitti, P.K. (2004). History Of Syria: Including Lebanon And Palestine. Gorgias Press LLC. ISBN 1-59333-119-3.
- Şen, Gül (2017). Ottoman Servant, Mamluk Rebel? Narrative Strategies in Sixteenth-Century Ottoman Historiography—the Example of Jānbirdī al-Ghazālī's Downfall. In: Stephan Conermann/ Gül Şen (eds.): The Mamluk-Ottoman Transition: Continuity and Change in Egypt and Bilād al-Shām in the Sixteenth Century. Bonn University Press at V& R unipress. ISBN 978-3-8471-0637-1.
