= Battle of Marj Dabiq =

Part of Ottoman–Mamluk War (1516–17)

- Part of the Ottoman–Mamluk War (1516–17)
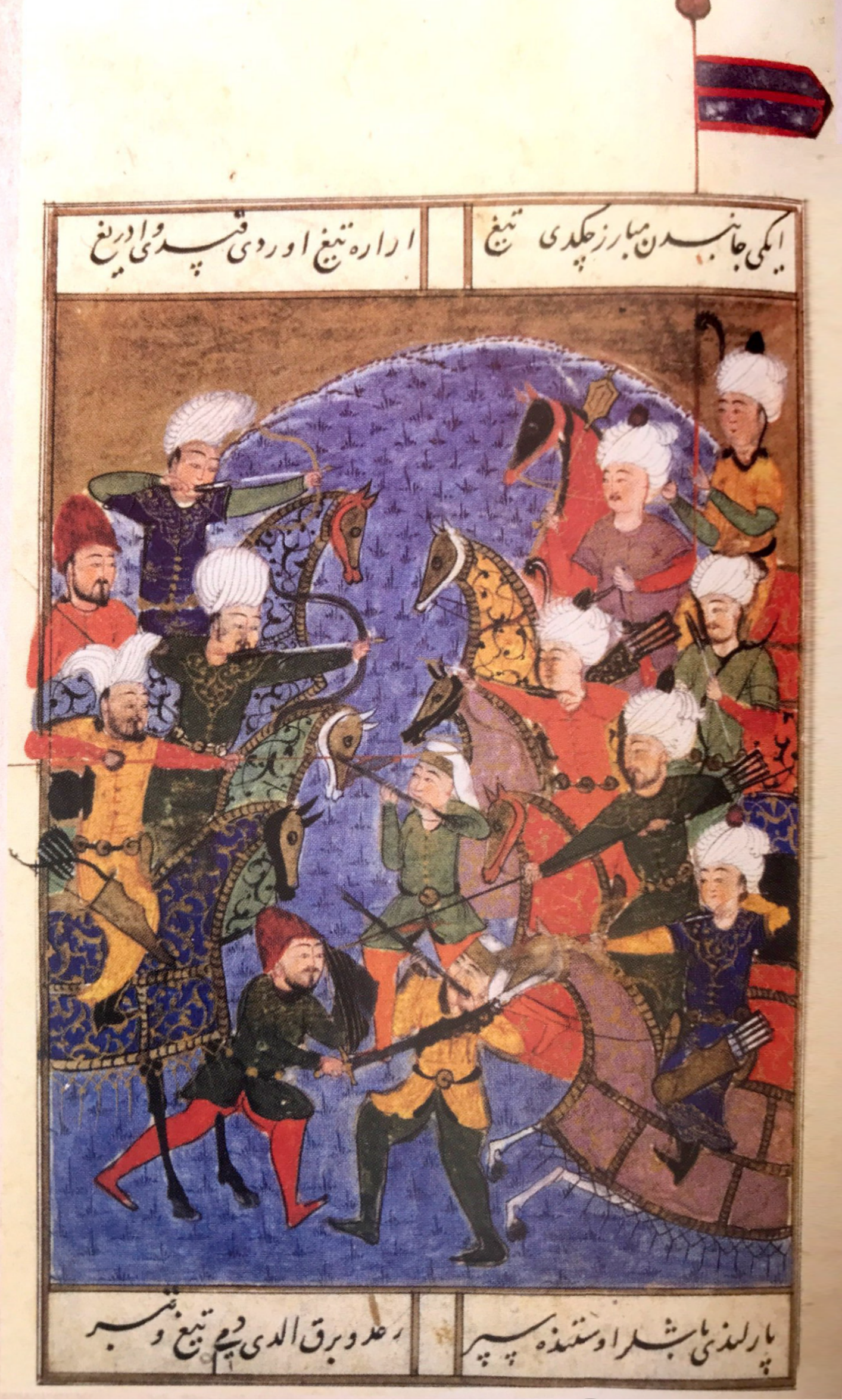
- An Ottoman miniature depicting the battle
Date	24 August 1516; 510 years ago
Location	Dabiq, near Aleppo, Mamluk Sultanate (modern Syria) 36.545°N 37.275°E
Result	Ottoman victory
Territorial changes	Ottoman annexation of Syria

Belligerents
Ottoman Empire; Mamluk rebels Ma'n dynasty	Mamluk Sultanate

Commanders and leaders
Selim I Hadım Sinan Pasha; Bıyıklı Mehmed Pasha; Fakhr al-Din I Hayır Bey	Al-Ashraf Qansuh al-Ghawri †; Janbirdi al-Ghazali; Alaa el-Din bin el-Emam

Strength
60,000	60,000–80,000: Mamluks; Auxiliary forces; Bedouin Arabs

Casualties and losses
10,000–25,000 killed	7,000–65,000 killed 2,000 executed

The Battle of Marj Dābiq (Arabic: مرج دابق, meaning "the meadow of Dābiq"; Turkish: Mercidabık Muharebesi), a decisive military engagement in Middle Eastern history, was fought on 24 August 1516, near the town of Dabiq, 44 km north of Aleppo (modern Syria). The battle was part of the 1516–17 war between the Ottoman Empire and the Mamluk Sultanate, which ended in an Ottoman victory and conquest of much of the Middle East and brought about the destruction of the Mamluk Sultanate. The Ottoman victory in the battle gave Selim's armies control of the entire region of Syria and opened the door to the conquest of Egypt.

== Battle preparations ==
Sultan Al-Ashraf Qansuh al-Ghawri spent the winter of 1515 and the spring of 1516 preparing an army, which he proposed leading to the disturbed confines of Asia Minor. Before beginning the march, Selim I sent an embassy promising in friendly terms to agree to Mamluk requests to appoint an Egyptian vassal to the Beylik of Dulkadir, a longstanding buffer state between Mamluks and Ottomans, and to reopen the frontier to the traffic of goods and slaves. On 18 May Al-Ashraf Qansuh al-Ghawri set out from Cairo with a large force, appointed well in all respects but artillery.

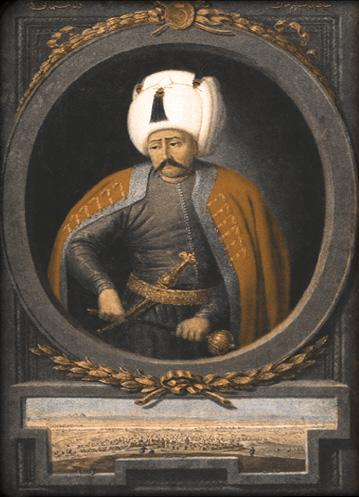
Portrait of Selim I by Konstantin Kapıdağlı

Leaving Al-Ashraf Tuman bay II in control of Cairo, the Sultan and his army marched north with great pomp and were accompanied by music, singing and festivity. The hosts included fifteen high-ranking emirs of a Thousand, 5,000 of his own royal Mamluks, and militia conscripts and were supplemented during the march by additional Syrian and Bedouin contingents. High officers of state, the Abbasid caliph Al-Mutawakkil III, sheikhs, and courtiers, together with muezzins, physicians and musicians, followed in his train.

On the way, al-Ghawri also received Ahmed, son of the late pretender to the Ottoman throne (Selim I's nephew), and brought him along with courtly honors in the hope of drawing over his sympathizers from the Ottoman force. Advancing slowly Al-Ashraf Qansuh al-Ghawri entered Damascus on 9 June, with carpets spread in his pathway, and European merchants scattered gold to the crowd. After a few days' stay, advancing at a leisurely pace, he was received at Homs and Hama with festivities and moved towards Aleppo.

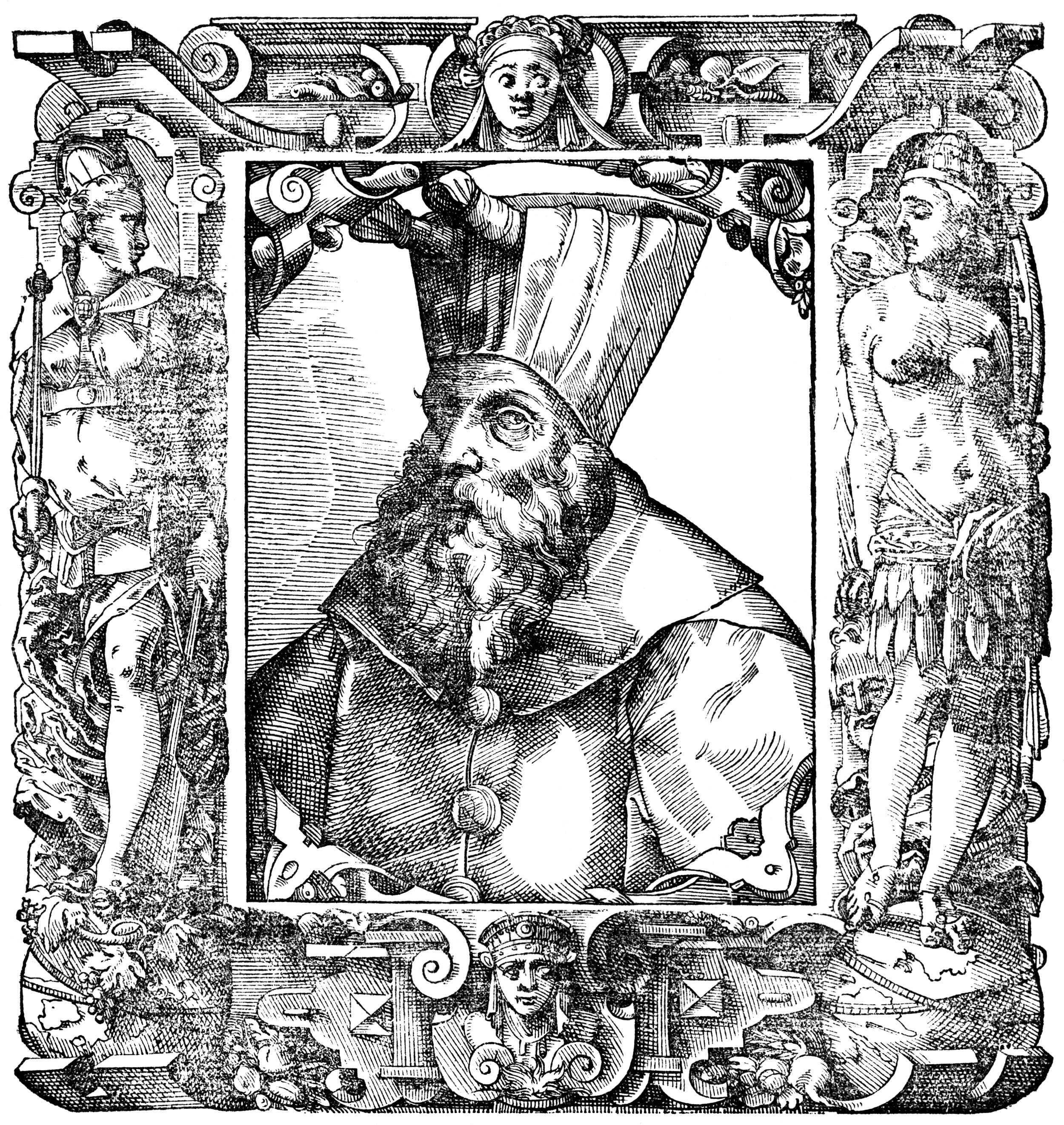
Portrait of Al-Ashraf Qansuh al-Ghawri, by Paolo Giovio (1483–1552)

Meanwhile, another embassy arrived from the Ottoman camp, which under the pretense of peace brought lavish presents to the Sultan, Caliph Al-Mutawakkil III, and his vizier. The gifts were accompanied by a request from Selim I for a supply of Egyptian sugar and confectionery. The envoy intimated that problems with the Shah of Persia Ismail I had forced him again to prepare for war and take the field. Chancellor Mughla Bey was sent back with counter-gifts, but by the time that he reached the Ottoman camp, Selim I had thrown off his ruse of peace. The Ottomans scorned the embassy and sent the chancellor back with his head and beard shaved and riding a lame mount.

== Mamluk betrayal ==
At Aleppo, the Mamluk governor Khai'r Bey had secretly sided with the Porte. Though the governor of Damascus had disclosed that to the Sultan, he discredited the information. To veil his treachery, Khai'r Bey gave al-Ghawri a splendid reception, but the inhabitants were enraged against the Mamluks by their behavior in the city.

It was at that point that Mughla Bey made his miserable return by reporting that Selim and his forces were advancing against them. With that immediate threat thrust upon them, the emirs, qadis, and royal Mamluks renewed their oaths of loyalty to the sultan. Al-Ghawri also distributed gifts to his personal forces, which displeased the other Mamluks. The sultan, dissuaded by the emir Janberdi al-Ghazali, ignored a final warning about Khai'r Bey's disloyalty before he took to the field.

== Battle ==
The Mamluk army advanced and on 20 August made camp at the plain of Marj Dabiq, a day's journey north of Aleppo. There, al-Ghawri and his men awaited the enemy's approach on this plain, where the sultanate's fate would soon be decided. According to the History of Egypt composed by Muḥammad ibn Aḥmad ibn Iyas, the Mamluks arranged themselves with the Sultan occupying the center column. Sibay, the Governor of Damascus, commanded the right flank, and Khai'r Bey, governor of Aleppo, took the left.

The marshal Sûdûn Adjami was the first to enter combat, followed by Sibay, leading an experienced corps of veteran Mamluk warriors. They rushed into battle and managed to kill several thousand Turkish soldiers in the first hours of fighting. This advantage forced the opposite Ottoman wing to begin a withdrawal, and the Mamluk forces under Sibay succeeded in taking several pieces of artillery and capturing some fusiliers. Selim considered retreat or requesting a truce.

It was at this point that the battle turned against the Mamluks. A rumor began to spread that al-Ghawri had ordered the recruits to hold their position, avoid combat, and leave the fighting to the veteran soldiers who were already engaged in battle. When Marshall Sûdûn Adjami and Sibay, who were leading the attack, were suddenly killed, panic broke out in the Mamluks' advancing right flank. Meanwhile, Khai'r Bey, in command of the left flank, called for a retreat. The fact that his forces were the first to quit the field was considered evidence of the man's betrayal.

Ibn Iyas offered the following account of the Mamluk defeat:

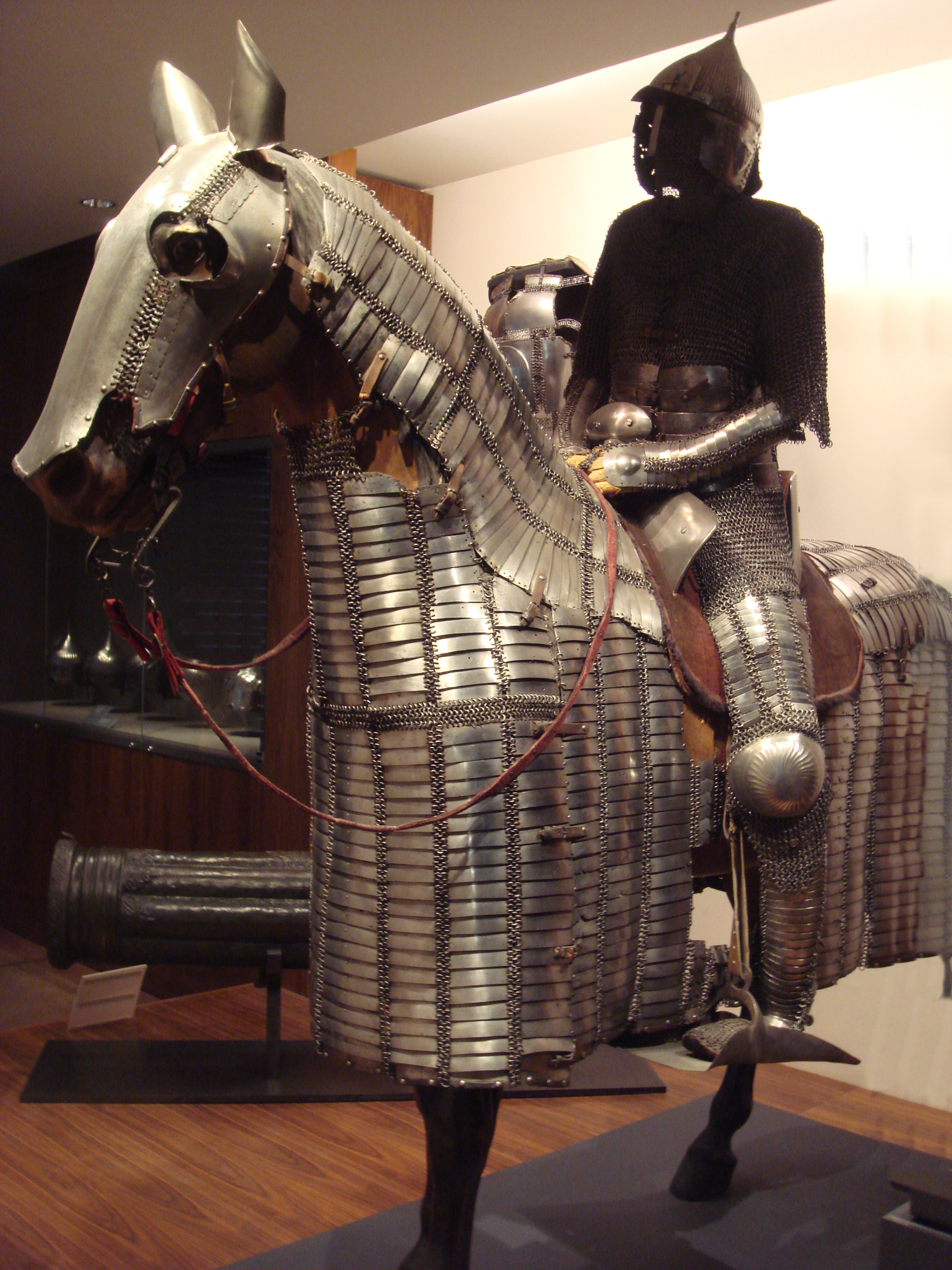
Ottoman heavy cavalry, circa 1550

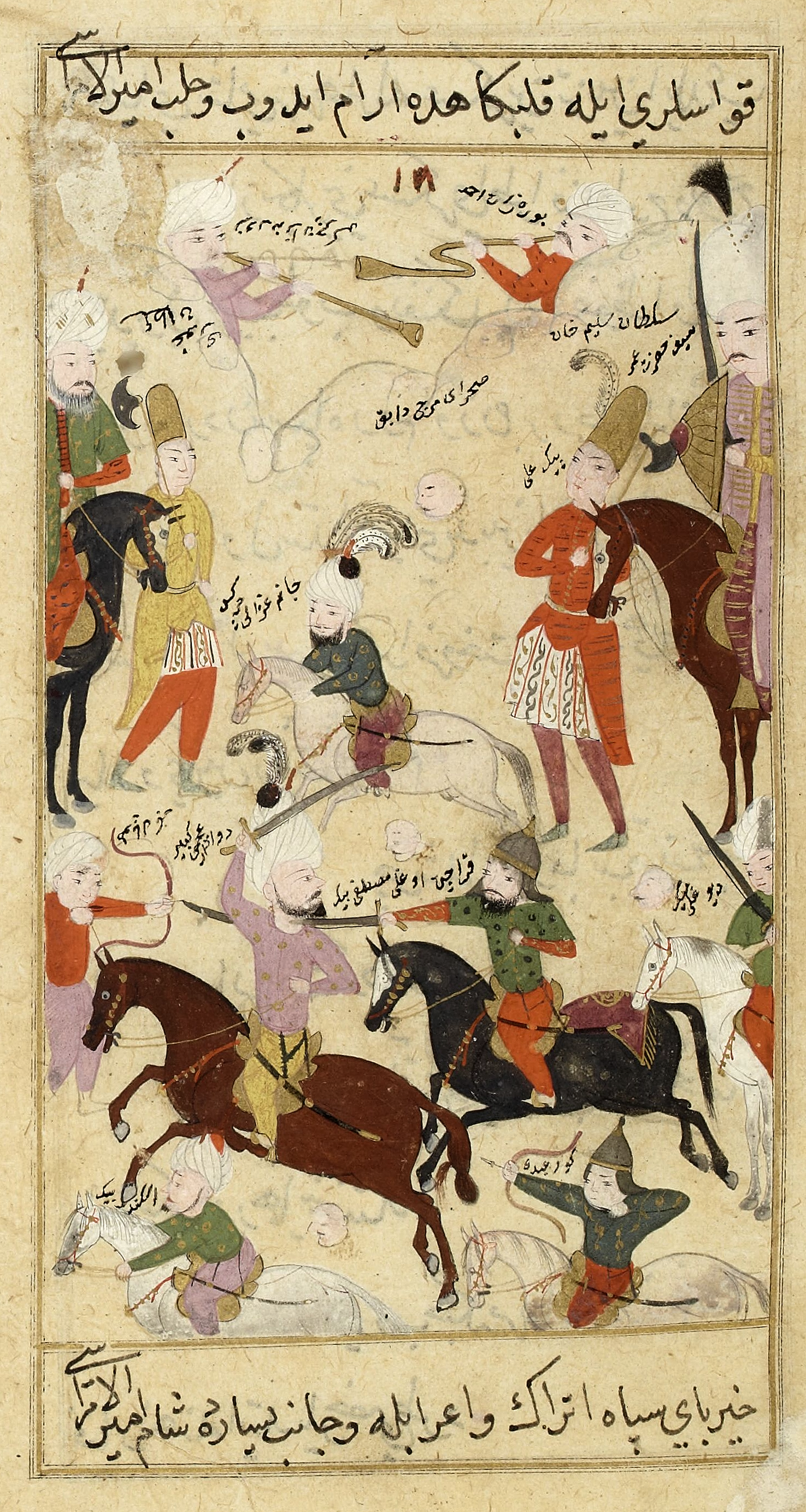
The battle between the Ottoman and Mamluk armies.

The sultan stood under his standard and called to his soldiers: "Aghas! This is the moment to take heart! Fight, and I will reward you!" But no one listened and the men fled from the battle. "Pray to God to give us victory!" Called al-Ghawri. This is the moment for prayer." But he found neither support nor defenders. He then began to feel an unquenchable fire. This was a particularly hot day, and an unusual fog of dust had risen between the armies. It was the day of God's anger directed against the Egyptian army, which stopped fighting. At the worst moment, and with the situation growing worse, the emir Timur Zardkash feared for the safety of the battle standard, lowered and stowed it, then came to find the sultan. He said to him: "Lord Sultan, the Ottoman army has defeated us. Save yourself and flee to Aleppo." When the sultan realized this, he was gripped by a sort of paralysis that affected the side of his body, and his jaw dropped open. He asked for water, which was brought to him in a golden goblet. He drank some, turned his horse to flee, advanced two paces, and fell from his saddle. After that, little by little, he surrendered his soul.

Accounts vary, however, as to how exactly Al-Ashraf Qansuh al-Ghawri met his end. Khai'r Bey may have spread a report of his death to precipitate the Egyptians' rout. According to one version of the battle, the sultan was found alive on the field and his head cut off and buried to prevent its falling into the enemy's hands. The Ottoman account relates that he was beheaded by a Turkish soldier, whom Selim initially insisted on executing but later pardoned. The Egyptian historian Ibn Iyas, by comparison, wrote that there were some who said he had died of a ruptured gallbladder and others who said he had poisoned himself.

== Aftermath ==
Selim I, welcomed by the inhabitants as a deliverer from the excesses of the Mamluks, entered Aleppo in triumph. He received the Abbasid caliph warmly, but upbraided the Islamic judges and jurists for their failure to check Mamluk misrule. Joined by Khai'r Bey and other Egyptian officers, he proceeded to the Citadel.

From Aleppo, he marched with his forces to Damascus, where terror prevailed. Beyond some attempts to protect the city by flooding the plain around, the remnants of the Mamluk forces had done nothing substantial to oppose the enemy. Discord amongst the emirs had paralyzed the army and prevented any decisive action that might have affected the subsequent course of events. Some of al-Ghawri's lieutenants supported Emir Janberdi Al-Ghazali as the new sultan, but others favoured the deceased ruler's son. As the Ottomans approached, however, resistance dissolved, as the remaining forces either went over to their side or fled to Egypt. Sultan Selim entered Damascus in mid-October, and the inhabitants readily surrendered to the conquerors.

== See also ==
- Ottoman–Mamluk War (1516–17)

== Bibliography ==
- Muir, William (1896). The Mameluke; or, Slave Dynasty of Egypt, 1260–1517, AD. Smith, Elder & Co.
- Hawting, G.R. (2005). Muslims, Mongols and Crusaders. Routledge. ISBN 0-415-45096-9.
- Petry, Carl F. (2008). The Cambridge History of Egypt: Islamic Egypt, 640–1516. Vol. I. Cambridge University Press. ISBN 978-0-521-47137-4.
- Waterson, James (2007). The Knights of Islam: The Wars of the Mamluks. Greenhill Books, London. ISBN 978-1-85367-734-2.
- Ирмияева, Т. Ю. (2000). История мусульманского мира: от Халифата до Блистательной Порты. Ural Limited. pp. 292–293. ISBN 978-5802901229 – via Гл. ред. Я.Ф. Болдырев; Отв. ред. О.С. Черепанова.
- Петросян, Юрий Ашотович (2013). Османская империя. Величайшие империи человечества. М.: Алгоритм. pp. 63–65. ISBN 978-5443801001.
