= Ala al-Dawla Bozkurt =

Beg of Dulkadir from 1480 to 1515

Bozkurt Beg
- Sultan; Malik al-Adil; Nur al-Dawla; Ghawth al-Millah; Amir al-Mu'minin
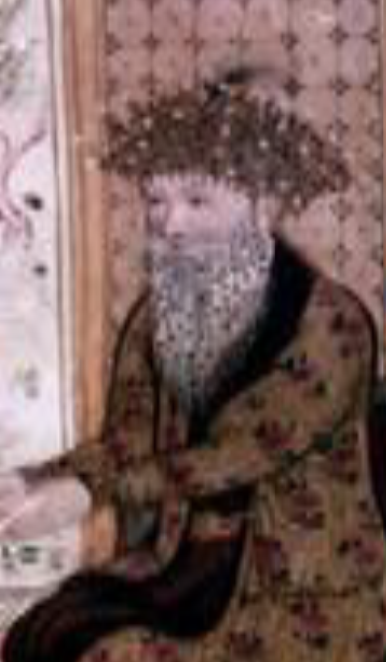
- Bozkurt Beg in a miniature by Mo'en Mosavver in Tarikh-e Alamara-ye Shah Ismail (1676)

Beg of Dulkadir
- Reign: Late 1480 – 13 June 1515
- Predecessor: Shah Budak
- Successor: Ali

Ottoman Sanjak-bey of Chirmen
- Reign: 1479

Ottoman Sanjak-bey of Kırşehir
- Reign: 1480
- Born: 1428
- Died: 13 June 1515 (aged 86–87); Ördekli, Beylik of Dulkadir
- Burial: Gökçeli, Andırın
- Consort: Shamsa Khatun (d. 1509)
- Issue Among others: Shahruh; Saru Kaplan; Ayşe Gülbahar Hatun; Beglu Hatun
- Royal house: Dulkadir
- Father: Suleiman
- Religion: Sunni Islam

Ala al-Dawla Bozkurt Beg (Turkish: Alaüddevle Bozkurt Bey; 1428 – 13 June 1515) (Note: Referred to as Aladul by 16–18th-century European sources.) was the ruler of Dulkadir in southern and central Anatolia from late 1480 until his death. Championed by the Ottoman Sultan Mehmed II (r. 1444–1446, 1451–1481), Bozkurt ousted his brother Shah Budak (r. 1465–1466, 1472–1480) and claimed the throne.

Bozkurt secured the Mamluk Sultanate's recognition of his rule in February 1481, and after Mehmed II's death, intended to follow a policy of friendly relations with both the Ottomans and the Mamluks despite growing animosity. Early into his reign, Bozkurt assisted Mehmed's successor Bayezid II (r. 1481–1512) in pursuing his rival claimant brother Cem Sultan, who was harbored by the Mamluks. Amidst Cem Sultan's pursuit, Bozkurt besieged the Mamluk-controlled city of Malatya, prompting a Mamluk offensive against him and the Ottomans. Although the Mamluks were overpowered in a series of engagements in early to mid-1484, Bozkurt's forces suffered a major defeat at Malatya in September.

In 1485, the Mamluk Sultan Qaitbay (r. 1468–1496) sought to isolate Bozkurt politically by proposing a truce with Bayezid II with the mediation of Caliph al-Mutawakkil II. Before the talks could come to fruition, Qaitbay dispatched his army to confront Bozkurt. Ottoman forces captured several key cities in Cilicia but were defeated by the Mamluks in March 1485 after Bozkurt failed to support the Ottomans as promised, leading to restored Mamluk control. Bozkurt's shifting allegiances caused further Ottoman–Mamluk clashes, including another Ottoman defeat in early 1486 due to Bozkurt's delayed aid. Bozkurt ultimately avoided any direct involvement in the conflict, relaying several requests for peace to Qaitbay, who dismissed all.

After escaping a Mamluk prison, Bozkurt's brother Shah Budak found safety under the Ottoman sultan. To punish Bozkurt for his disloyalty, the Ottomans gave their support Shah Budak, who had escaped Mamluk custody. However, Bozkurt misled much of the Ottoman supporting forces, and a portion of the commanders who favored Bozkurt deserted Shah Budak, leading to his defeat and escape to Mamluk Egypt.

After Shah Budak's defeat, Bozkurt followed a policy of neutrality in the context of Ottoman–Mamluk relations but covertly acted against the Ottomans when he saw fit. In 1490, the Mamluk army under Uzbek mobilized and ransacked parts of Anatolia, following Bozkurt's advice. Mediation by a Hafsid delegation at the Ottoman throne resulted in a truce, while Bozkurt secured a pardon from the Ottomans. Following Qaitbay's death in 1492, Bozkurt supported the rebel Akbirdi and sheltered him despite objections from the Mamluks. After Akbirdi's forces suffered defeats near Aintab in 1498, resulting in the deaths of two of Bozkurt's sons, Bozkurt briefly intensified his support. Reconciled with the Mamluks in 1499, Bozkurt withdrew his backing for Akbirdi, who soon died after another failed rebellion.

Bozkurt antagonized the Safavid ruler Ismail I (r. 1501–1524), who conquered vast portions of modern-day Iran. Bozkurt declined Ismail's wish to marry his daughter and instead gave his support to the Aq Qoyunlu and made an effort to expand to the east, temporarily seizing various towns such as Urfa and Diyarbekir. Dulkadirid rule in the region did not last long as Bozkurt suffered multiple major defeats at the hands of Ismail's commander, Mohammad Khan Ustajlu. Despite this, Bozkurt eventually established peaceful relations with Ismail. This facilitated the new Ottoman sultan Selim I (r. 1512–1520) to make plans to replace Bozkurt with his nephew Ali as Bozkurt gave support to Ismail, Selim's enemy. After overpowering Ismail at the Battle of Chaldiran in 1514, Selim changed his focus to the Dulkadirids. Bozkurt was killed at the Battle of Turnadağ and was succeeded by Ali.

== Background ==
The Beylik of Dulkadir was founded in southern Anatolia and northern Syria by Zayn al-Din Qaraja (r. 1337–1353), a local Turkmen lord, as a client state of the Mamluk Sultanate. Qaraja eventually rebelled against the Mamluks and was executed in 1353. The conflict between the Dulkadirids and the Mamluks persisted during the successive rule of Qaraja's sons Ghars al-Din Khalil (r. 1353–1386) and Shaban Suli (r. 1386–1398), who were both assassinated on the orders of the Mamluk Sultan Barquq (r. 1382–1389, 1390–1399). With the reigns of Bozkurt's grandfather, Mehmed (r. 1399–1442), and father, Suleiman (r. 1442–54), the Dulkadirids attempted to forge amicable relations both with the Ottoman state and the Mamluk Sultanate.

The death of Malik Arslan (r. 1454–1465), Bozkurt's brother, marked the start of an era of struggle between his other brothers. Shah Budak (r. 1465–1466, 1472–1480) initially claimed the throne with Mamluk support. Shortly after, he was forced out of the throne by the Ottoman-backed Shah Suwar (r. 1466–1472). Throughout his reign, Shah Suwar was involved in a persistent dispute with the Mamluks. Emboldened by his victories, he considerably expanded his territory. The Ottomans eventually withdrew their support as they disapproved of his disloyalty and continuous conflict with their southern neighbors. The Mamluks recovered their previous losses, captured Shah Suwar and executed him, reinstating Shah Budak as the head of the Dulkadirid state.

== Early life ==
Bozkurt was born to Suleiman Beg in 1428. In 1467, Bozkurt arranged his daughter Ayshe Hatun's marriage to Bayezid, the son and future successor of Mehmed II (r. 1444–1446, 1451–1481) of the Ottoman Empire. After the marriage, Bozkurt lived with his son-in-law but returned to his homeland a short while after. Bozkurt momentarily found refuge in the Ottoman realm following the defeat of Shah Suwar by the hostile Mamluks in 1472.

In 1479, Bozkurt raided the region around Sivas, eliciting a counter-attack by Mihaloghlu Ali Bey, the local sanjak-bey (provincial governor), who captured Bozkurt's wife and son. In retaliation, Bozkurt pursued Ali Bey near Çiğnem Stream with a supporting force of a thousand cavalry he received from Shah Budak, forcing Ali Bey to flee to a nearby fortress. Afraid of the repercussions of his animosity with an Ottoman official, Bozkurt traveled to Constantinople to appeal to Mehmed II. The latter, wishing to restore the Ottoman influence over the Dulkadirids, made Bozkurt the sanjak-bey of Chirmen and awarded him a robe of honour. Mehmed II strove to enthrone Bozkurt after Qaitbay (r. 1468–1496) dismissed his earlier promise of leaving the Mamluk Sultanate to the Ottomans in exchange for their help against Shah Suwar. On the other hand, the Mamluks were in a vulnerable position following their defeat by the Aq Qoyunlu ruler Yaqub (r. 1478–1490) in Ruha in November 1480. Mehmed II thus granted Bozkurt the sanjak of Kırşehir.

Bozkurt marched on Shah Budak with auxiliary Ottoman forces. He initially faced a defeat as some of the Turkmens under him switched sides. The Ottoman forces led by Bayezid's kapıcıbaşı (chief palace gatekeeper) fled to Sis, where they were executed by the city's Mamluk governor, Sakalsizoghlu Yusuf, and their heads were used in a game of jereed (horseback javelin-throwing) in Cairo. Mehmed II allowed Bozkurt a larger army under his command, which finally defeated and dethroned Shah Budak near the Çiğnem Stream on an unknown date. In March 1480, Shah Budak requested to enter the Mamluk territory near Aleppo. Local scholar Ibn Tulun recorded Shah Budak's arrival in Damascus on 14 February 1481, who lastly reached Egypt. Uzbek, the Mamluk governor of Damascus, who was in the region tasked with countering the fall of Ruha, did not assist Shah Budak in restoring him to his throne, and instead imprisoned him at the Citadel of Damascus.

== Reign ==
=== First Ottoman–Mamluk War ===
Aiming to gain recognition, Bozkurt sent one of his sons to the Mamluk capital of Cairo and granted the Mamluks various towns and fortresses in northern Syria. In February 1481, Bozkurt asked Uzbek to transmit his wish to receive a manshur (diploma) and a robe of honour from Qaitbay. In April, Bozkurt reached Aleppo but did not enter the city preempting his fears of getting captured by the Mamluks. There, Janibak Habib al-Inali, sent there by Uzbek, gave Bozkurt a robe signifying Qaitbay's approval of Mamluk patronage over the Dulkadirids.

The next month, Mehmed II died unexpectedly, possibly amidst the preparations for a campaign against the Mamluk Sultanate. Bozkurt attempted to simultaneously maintain amicable relations with the Mamluks and with the new Ottoman sultan, Bayezid II (r. 1481–1512). Amidst the revolt initiated by his claimant brother Cem Sultan, Bayezid II requested Bozkurt to find Cem in early March 1482, who potentially passed through Bozkurt's realm. Bozkurt was unsuccessful in catching Cem, who managed to escape to the Mamluks in Egypt. Cem later returned to Anatolia and allied himself with Kasim Beg, last ruler of the Karamanids (r. 1474–1475), to overthrow Bayezid II. Bozkurt started pursuing him once again in June 1482, accompanied by Iskender Pasha. Bozkurt met with Bayezid II in Laranda, informing him of the failure to restrain Cem, who found refuge with the Knights of Rhodes. Bozkurt thus returned to his country in July. Following Cem's escape, a population of Muslims and Christians from Karaman, then governed by Bayezid's son Abdullah, migrated to the Dulkadirid domains, causing a dispute over tax jurisdiction with the Ottomans. It is known that Bayezid II intervened in the issue; the exact outcome is unknown but presumably preserved peace between the two sides.

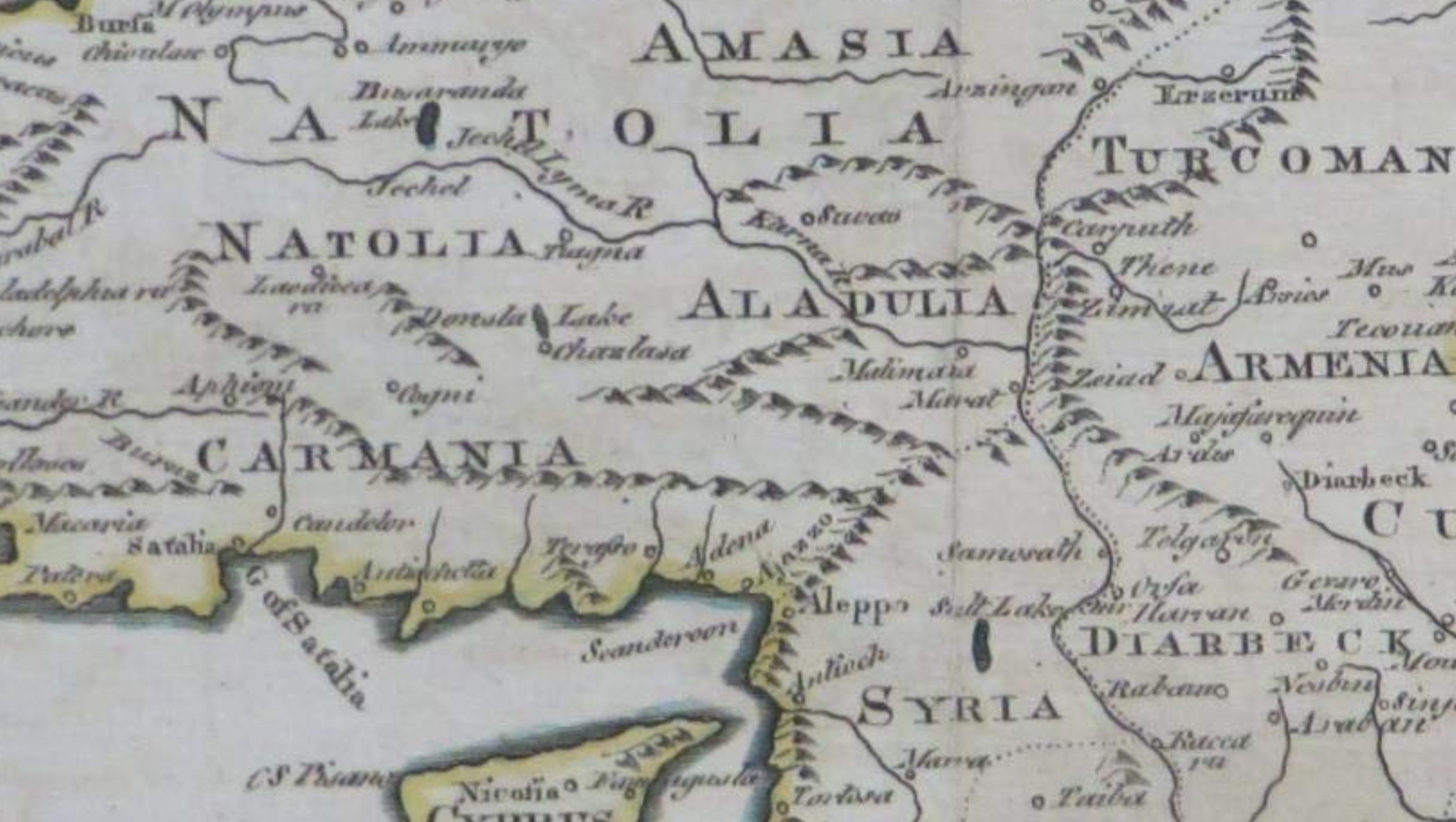
Domains of Ala al-Dawla (Aladulia) located between Natolia, Caramania, Armenia, and Turcomania, as depicted by English cartographer John Seller in 1690

Bozkurt laid siege to the Mamluk-held city of Malatya in July 1483 in response to Mamluk harboring of Cem Sultan, either encouraged by Bayezid or intending to incite Bayezid into engaging with his southern neighbor. With their long-time northern frontier in jeopardy, the Mamluks sent an army, including 500 Royal Mamluks, to the region in August. As the Mamluk forces were stationed around Aleppo, the Ottoman–Dulkadirid alliance additionally faced threats by the offensive led by the Ramadanid warlord Eflatun Beg from the Cilician Plain and the nearby rebellion of the chieftain Turgudoghlu Mahmud Pasha. The Mamluks penetrated the Dulkadirid lands devastating parts of the country and its fields. Bozkurt evacuated Elbistan, the capital, secluding his family and army in the mountains and calling for support from Bayezid's son Ahmed. Bayezid backed Bozkurt with an army led by Yakub Pasha and Turkmen tribes loyal to the Ottomans. Contemporary Mamluk historian Ibn Iyas described this decision as "the first move by the Ottomans against the [Mamluk] sultan's country", while another contemporary writer, the Ottoman historian Kemalpaşazade, characterized this as "the onset of hostility and the beginning of enmity". Near Elbistan in February or March, the first clashes between the Ottoman and Mamluk forces resulted in major casualties and defeat of the latter.

Qaitbay mobilized the military in Egypt, which marched north in May or June 1484. Among its ranks were 500 Royal Mamluks, the future Mamluk sultan Qansuh al-Ghawri (r. 1501–1516) as the newly appointed amīr ʿashara (lit. 'emir of ten'), and amīr silah (chief arms bearer) Temeruz al-Shamsi as its leader. The force was joined by local Bedouins near Ramla. Bozkurt demanded help from Bayezid II. The Ottoman sultan tasked Yakub Pasha to deal with the Mamluks, who had pillaged Marash and were approaching Elbistan. Sometime between 24 August and 21 September 1484, a bloody battle took place near the fortress of Hirman, to the north of Elbistan, resulting in an Ottoman–Dulkadirid victory. Waradbash, the governor of Aleppo, was beheaded by Bozkurt, Almas, the governor of Safed, died in battle, and Aynal and Korkmaz, the governors of Tripoli and Tarsus, respectively, were both captured. Amidst the skirmishes the same year Bozkurt blinded Shah Budak's son Shahqubad Feyyaz.

After this victory, Bozkurt persuaded Yakub Pasha to attempt to seize Malatya. There on 23 September, the Ottoman forces were flanked by Timraz and suffered many casualties, although Yakub Pasha and Bozkurt were able to flee. The Mamluks celebrated the victory in Aleppo by parading the Ottoman prisoners in the city, while Bozkurt attempted to provoke fear in the Mamluk realm by releasing the Mamluk prisoners, including the former governors, after having their fingers cut. The defeat, as the contemporary historian Idris Bitlisi reported, was caused by the flight of the Dulkadirid forces due to the unexpected arrival of the Royal Mamluk forces amidst the Ottoman–Dulkadirid troops' pursuit of the initially repelled Mamluk army. Aşıkpaşazade and Sa'd al-Din directly accused Bozkurt of "arrogance" and exaggerated confidence in his forces.

=== Second Ottoman–Mamluk War ===
Aiming to politically isolate Bozkurt, Qaitbay sent Bayezid an embassy with a manshur from Caliph al-Mutawakkil II proposing to recognize Bayezid as a legitimate sultan in the lands he ruled over, as well as those he could conquer from the non-Muslims in the future. Al-Mutawakkil called for the two Islamic rulers to cease the mutual conflict. Before Qaitbay could receive a response from the Ottoman sultan, he sent a Mamluk army on Bozkurt in 1485. Shah Budak was released from prison in Damascus, but was put back in jail as he was not trusted. Qaitbay's embassy returned to Cairo with the news that they weren't welcomed in Constantinople. That year, the Ottoman forces commanded by Mahmud Pasha, the beylerbey (provincial governor) of Karaman, and Karagoz Pasha occupied the Gülek Castle, Adana, and Tarsus after the complaints of the local Turkmen magnates about Mamluk rule. The Mamluk army, led by Uzbek and various other Syrian Mamluk emirs, thus changed its destination to Adana and Tarsus. The Ottoman and Mamluk forces met each other on the opposite banks of the Seyhan River on 12 March 1485. Karagoz Pasha accepted Bozkurt's request for him to postpone the combat by two days, in order for the Dulkadirids to arrive. However, Bozkurt did not send aid to the Ottomans as he claimed he would, which contributed to the defeat of the Ottomans, leading to the restoration of the Mamluk rule over the Cilician Plain. While scholars agree that Bozkurt's wavering allegiance in 1485 was the cause of the Ottoman–Mamluk clashes, this conventional view belittles Bayezid's contribution to the conflict according to historian Cihan Yüksel.

Bozkurt changed his stance and conveyed his wish to make peace with the Mamluks in December 1485. Qaitbay declined the request. Bozkurt strove to avoid the conflict he had helped create between the two major regional empires. When Bayezid called for his support in the efforts to reclaim the Cilician Plain, Bozkurt intentionally sent his forces late, which resulted in another Ottoman defeat in February 1486 and the capture of the Ottoman commander Hersekzade Ahmed Pasha. Bozkurt sent Qaitbay another request for a truce, which was also rejected. Bayezid then assigned Koca Davud Pasha to deal with the Mamluks and wanted Bozkurt to join the Ottoman forces. Bozkurt maintained that he was far from the region and his army was composed of highlanders who could not fight in coastal areas. When Davud Pasha marched on the Turgud and Varsak tribes in the region of Taşeli, Bozkurt reversed his decision and met with him in Kocakale, on the Anti-Taurus Mountains. He convinced Davud Pasha to pursue the Karamanid prince Mahmud, who had indirectly helped the Mamluks by inciting the tribes in the region to rebel. When Mahmud escaped to Aleppo and the seasonal conditions worsened, Davud Pasha went to Vize, where the Ottoman sultan resided, and Bozkurt returned to Marash.

=== War against Shah Budak ===
On 26 September 1487, Shah Budak managed to break out from prison with the help of his wife and slaves, who often visited his chambers. Shah Budak traveled to the Bagras Mountains, where allied Turkmen lords assisted him in passing the Taurus Mountains in the direction of the Ottoman lands. Bayezid welcomed him and appointed him as the sanjak-bey of Vize, which was a warning sign to Bozkurt that the Ottomans could attempt to depose him. On 14 March 1488, Hadım Ali Pasha, the beylerbey of Karaman, recaptured Adana and Tarsus from the Mamluks. Ali Pasha restored the fortress in Adana and was preparing to return to Constantinople, when the news of incoming Mamluk forces from Aleppo arrived. Bozkurt parried the Ottomans' call for aid, explaining that he would be waiting in Geben in case the Mamluks tried to enter the Dulkadirid domains. The Ottoman forces were vanquished by the Mamluk and allied Turkmen forces on 16 August 1488 near Ağaçayırı. Bozkurt strengthened his ties with the Mamluks by marrying his daughter to the victorious commander Uzbek. Shortly after, Hadım Ali Pasha reported Bozkurt's disloyalty to the sultan.

Bayezid thus declared Shah Budak as the legitimate ruler of Dulkadir, granted him a diploma of investiture and provided him with the assistance of Hiziroghlu Mehmed Pasha and Iskender Pasha, the sanjak-beys of Little Rum (Amasya and Sivas) and Kayseri, respectively. Shah Budak first arrived in Kırşehir, where he captured the local garrison commander, Shahruh, Bozkurt's son. Shah Budak blinded Shahruh in retribution for the treatment his son Feyyaz had received in 1484. Shah Budak succeeded in occupying a portion of the Dulkadirid domains, which elicited powerful opposition from his brother. Qaitbay learned of the conflict in March 1489. Bozkurt forged a letter to Mahmud Pasha from Shah Budak, claiming total victory on the battlefield by Shah Budak. On the other hand, due to his sympathy for Bozkurt, Mehmed Pasha was purposefully late to the skirmish, which left Shah Budak unassisted apart from about 1000 Ottoman troops under Iskender Bey. Shah Budak fled the battle, Iskender Bey and his son were captured, and the Ottomans suffered approximately 200 casualties. Shah Budak took his son Feyyaz with him and escaped to Syria and later to Cairo, where he begged Qaitbay for forgiveness. Qaitbay instead exiled him to Upper Egypt in November 1489.

=== Conflict with the Mamluks ===
The Mamluk army stationed in Aleppo under Uzbek mobilized for Cilicia in May 1490. Following Bozkurt's advice, Uzbek laid siege to Kayseri. When the Ottoman troops appeared close to the city, Uzbek halted the siege and returned south after ransacking Niğde, Ereğli, and Karaman, while Bozkurt retreated to his own country. In response to the damage caused by the Mamluks, Bayezid initiated preparations for a major war. Uzbek ordered Bozkurt to meet with his emir-i ahur (chief stableman) in Pazarcık. Although Bozkurt wanted to go there, his son Saru Kaplan and loyal chieftains persuaded him not to. When Uzbek insisted, Bozkurt maintained his neutrality fearing the campaign Bayezid was preparing for. Upon the rumors of a new Ottoman expedition, Qaitbay sent an embassy to the Ottoman capital headed by Mamluk commander Mamay al-Khassaki and one of Bozkurt's ambassadors. The embassy arrived in Constantinople on 4 July 1490. Although Mamay claimed that Qaitbay did not consent to Uzbek's prior actions, this failed to appease an irate Bayezid, who mistreated the Dulkadirid ambassador. The Mamluk embassy was put under house arrest, not to be released until December or January, which has been obscured by Ottoman chroniclers as such a treatment of a Mamluk official was unprecedented and did not cast a favourable light on Bayezid. The timely mediation of a Hafsid embassy at the Ottoman court facilitated the agreement between the Ottoman and the Mamluk Sultanates to sign a truce without combat, and Bozkurt successfully sought pardon from the Ottoman sultan.

After Qaitbay's death in 1492, dawatdar (head of the chancery) Akbirdi led an unsuccessful insurrection in Cairo and in its aftermath went to Syria with hopes of carving out a new state for himself. Bozkurt allowed Akbirdi and Aynal, the former governor of Aleppo, to stay in his realm against the wishes of the new governor of Aleppo, Janbulad. Despite Dulkadirid support, Akbirdi fled east of the Euphrates after a major defeat near Aintab in May 1498, where Aynal and two of Bozkurt's sons were killed by the Mamluk forces. Distraught by his sons' deaths, Bozkurt allowed a larger portion of the Dulkadirid army under Akbirdi's command in an attempt to seize Aleppo in October the same year. The Mamluks gifted Bozkurt a robe of honour and a diploma in exchange for withdrawing his support from Akbirdi. The latter was defeated again at Aleppo, which forced Bozkurt to reconcile with the Mamluks in May 1499. Akbirdi returned to Aleppo after the agreement but died there one month later.

=== Advent of Ismail ===
The Ottoman–Dulkadirid relations momentarily took a positive turn. Bozkurt received four Polish prisoners from the voivode of Moldavia, who had overpowered Poland with Ottoman support. In 1500, members of the Dulkadirid tribe joined the Ottomans in the Battle of Modon against the Republic of Venice. The same year, Bozkurt's son Shahruh assisted the Ottomans in extinguishing a revolt by the Varsak and Turgud tribes in response to changes in taxation. Bozkurt continued to preserve his amicable relations with the Mamluks and acted as an intermediary in a discord between Arikmaz, the governor of Birecik, and the Mamluk government.

A new threat to the Dulkadirids at the time came from the east, as the Safavid ruler Ismail I rose in the former Aq Qoyunlu lands. Ismail had attained a significant degree of influence over the Turkmens in Iran and Anatolia. Ismail followed Shia Islam, which also spread in the Dulkadirid realm. Bozkurt attempted to bar many Shia, or Qizilbash, Turkmens he ruled over from migrating east to join Ismail. Coincidentally, Ismail proposed to marry to Bozkurt's daughter, Benli Khatun. Although Bozkurt initially indicated his potential approval, he eventually declined on the grounds of Ismail's adherence to Shiism. In the spring of 1502, when Ismail reached Tercan pursuing the Aq Qoyunlu claimant Alvand Beg, he sent a portion of his troops against Bozkurt but promptly left the region upon the news of Alvand's offensive on Tabriz. In June 1503, Ismail defeated the last Aq Qoyunlu ruler, Sultan Murad, in Hamadan, forcing him to ultimately flee to Baghdad. When Ismail appeared in Baghdad, both Murad and the Aq Qoyunlu governor of Arab Iraq, Barik Beg Purnak, escaped to Marash. Bozkurt requested help against Ismail from Bayezid, who did not act upon Bozkurt's wish and instead congratulated Ismail for his victories, in order to avoid a confrontation with the Safavids. Bozkurt married his daughter Benlu to Sultan Murad and assisted him in the restoration of his rule over Baghdad in the spring of 1504 when Ismail was occupied with his campaign in Mazandaran in northern Iran. The Ottoman and Mamluk diplomatic negotiations that and the next year were almost always preoccupied by the political tension caused by Ismail in the Middle East. One exception to this was the diplomatic traffic for the Ottoman harboring of Dawlatbay, the Mamluk dissident and governor of Tripoli, during which Bozkurt led the initial talks.

Alvand Beg's death in Diyarbekir ignited an internal struggle over the succession within the Aq Qoyunlu remnants. Bozkurt supported Göde Ahmed's younger son Zaynal against Amir Beg, the divan-begi (chief justice) of Alvand, with a large force containing almost all of the young members of the Dulkadir dynasty. The force marched towards Ergani and destroyed its fortress. The Kurdish chieftains of Eğil, Atak, and Silvan joined the Dulkadirids. Mardin was captured by Shahruh, who placed a 300-strong garrison in the city. The Dulkadirids seized Sinjar and advanced until Mosul. The Dulkadirids triumphed over a force of the Mawsillu tribe, which was on its way to provide aid to the besieged city of Urfa. The fall of the latter to the Dulkadirids marked the end of the campaign. However, Zaynal's rule in Diyarbekir did not continue for long, as his poor administrative decisions facilitated the restoration of Amir Beg's rule. Zaynal returned to the Dulkadirid court, and Bozkurt instead pressured Amir Beg to recognize him as his overlord.

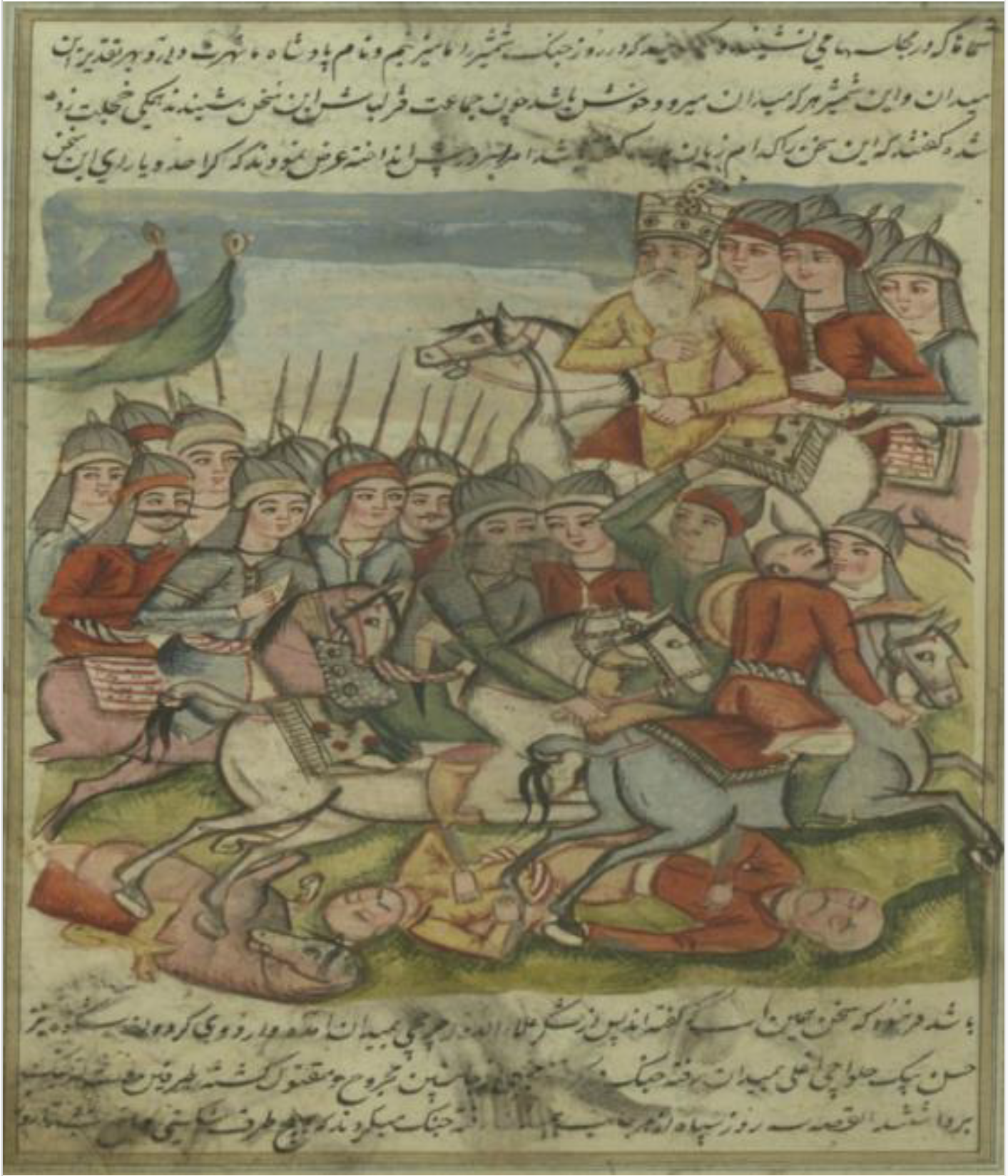
The Safavid–Dulkadirid conflict as depicted by an unknown artist, from Tarikh-e Alam-ara-ye Shah Ismail.

Bozkurt's affiliation with the Aq Qoyunlu escalated Ismail's hostility towards him. In early May 1507, Ismail led an army of 20,000 troops against him. Ismail entered the Ottoman domains through Erzincan and Suşehri, with Bayezid's approval, in an offensive against the Dulkadirids. Ismail arrived at the Dulkadirid frontier near Sarız, headed towards Elbistan. Although Saru Kaplan repelled the Safavid reconnaissance forces, who suffered 300 casualties, he retreated when Ismail himself arrived in the region with his main army. Bozkurt hid himself in Mount Turna and called for Ottoman help, which arrived in Ankara but did not engage in the conflict. Ismail erected his encampment on the slopes of Mount Turna. After a long wait for Bozkurt to come out of hiding, Ismail stopped the siege, dubbing Bozkurt ala dana (lit. 'red calf'). Bozkurt sent an embassy to Cairo declaring this as a victory and presenting several severed heads of Safavid troops. The Mamluk Sultan Qansuh al-Ghawri ordered their display on the Bab Zuweila gate of Cairo Citadel, both as a source of pride and as a message to the Ottomans that he was able to defeat their common foe. Ismail returned to Azerbaijan after devastating Elbistan and Marash and imposing Safavid rule in Diyarbekir and Harpoot. Bozkurt retook Urfa as soon as Ismail left the country, and reinforced Kaitmaz's forces, the brother of Amir Beg, who was trying to reclaim Diyarbekir from its Safavid governor Mohammad Khan Ustajlu, who was encamped near Mardin dealing with the Kurdish nomads who harassed the Safavids. Promising to marry Kaitmaz to one of his daughters, Bozkurt sent him back to Diyarbekir with an army commanded by Bozkurt's sons, Saru Kaplan and Erdivane. However, in 1509, 800 Safavid troops recaptured Diyarbekir from the Dulkadirids: Bozkurt's sons were executed, and Mohammad Khan sent their heads to Ismail. Kaitmaz continued resisting the Safavids but was soon captured and killed.

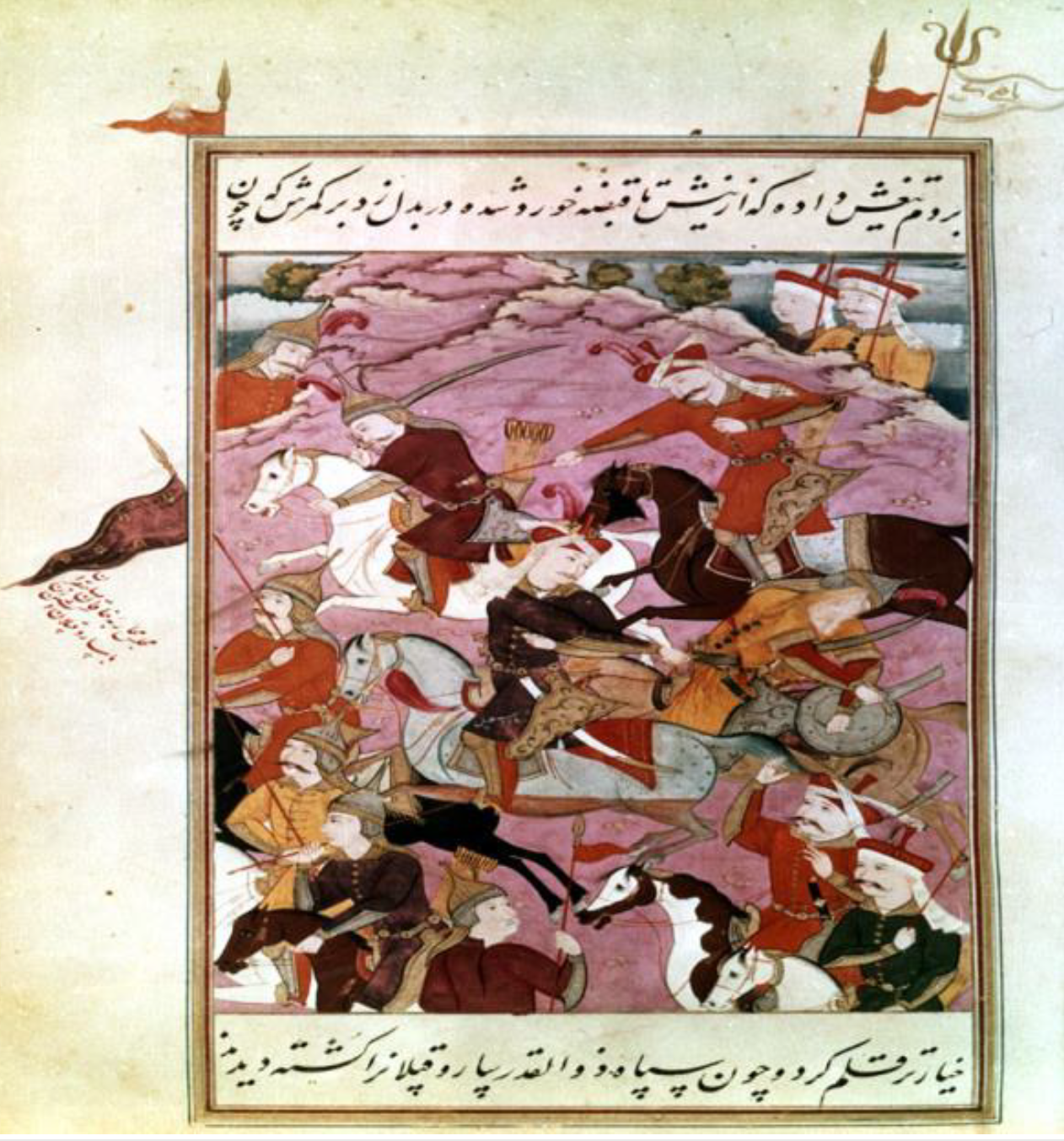
Ismail's fight with Saru Kaplan as illustrated by Mo'en Mosavver in Tarikh-e Alam-ara-ye Shah Ismail.

The spring of 1510 marked a new Dulkadirid campaign against Diyarbekir, taking advantage of the Safavid campaign against Baghdad. A 14,000-strong force led by Bozkurt's sons Shahruh and Ahmed faced Mohammad Khan Ustajlu. Before the battle, the Dulkadirid and the Safavid forces observed a customary dog fight. When their dogs scared away those of the Dulkadirids, the Safavids took this as a sign of good luck and made a successful attack. Shahruh and Ahmed along with forty other men were caught and immediately beheaded, apart from Shahruh's sons Mehmed and Ali, who were spared and appointed to important positions by Ismail. Bozkurt was deeply saddened by the departure of his sons and mourned them for a long period by wearing black.

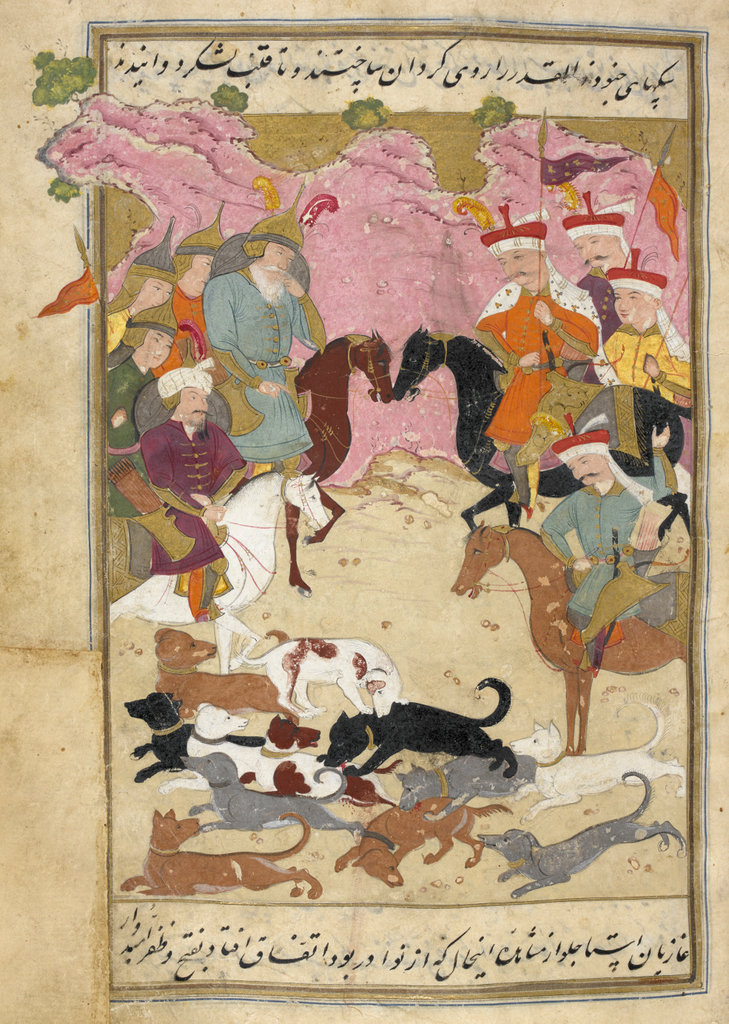
Ala al-Dawla Bozkurt (top left mounting a horse) and Ismail watching their dogs fight each other in a c. 1650 miniature from Tarikh-e Alamara-ye Shah Ismail.

=== War with the Ottomans and death ===
The forces of Mohammad Khan violated the Mamluk border near Malatya without the knowledge of Ismail but were eventually repelled by Bozkurt. Ismail followed a reconciliatory policy with the Mamluk sultan Qansuh al-Ghawri and Bozkurt, gifting the latter amenities that included a tent in 1511. The new Ottoman sultan Selim I (r. 1512–1520) was aware of the restored relations between Bozkurt and his enemy Ismail. Moreover, Bozkurt had not sent any congratulatory messages to Selim for his ascension to the throne, which contributed to their growingly hostile relations. When Selim requested him to take part in his campaign against the Safavids in Chaldiran by calling upon their shared adherence to Sunni Islam, Bozkurt declined, pointing out his advanced age. At the time, Selim was harboring Bozkurt's nephew Ali, who was made the sanjak-bey of Chirmen, as a claimant to the Dulkadirid throne. On the other hand, Bozkurt had enacted an embargo in his realm on food and animal feed from the Ottoman realm. Wary of any attacks that could come from the Dulkadirids, Selim left a 40,000-strong force to cover his flanks between Kayseri and Sivas as he was marching east.

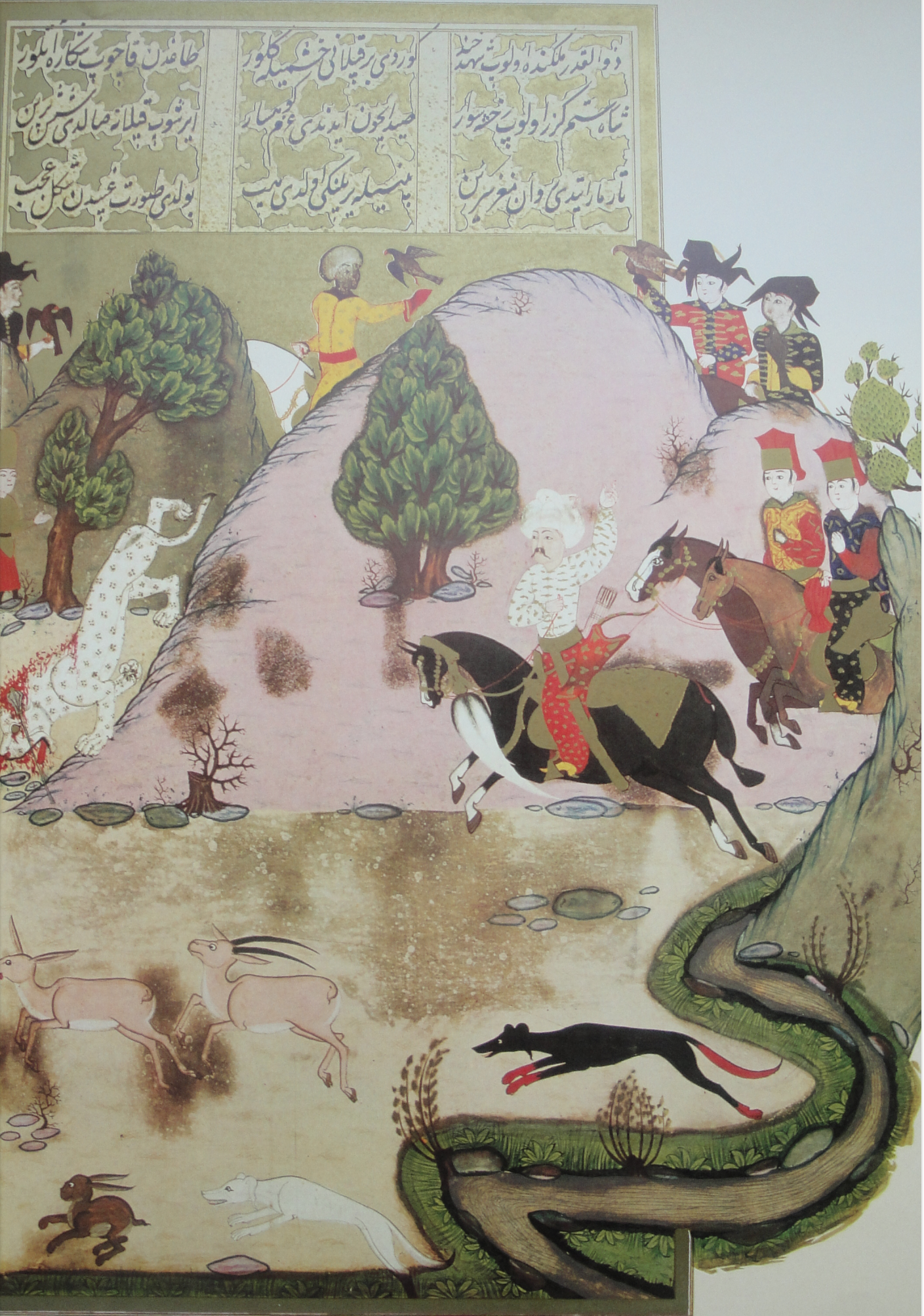
Selim hunts a tiger in the Dulkadirid realm near the Küskün Stream, from Hünername (1584).

In November 1514, returning from a victory against the Safavids at Chaldiran, Selim appointed Ali as the sanjak-bey of Kayseri, on the border with the Dulkadirid domains, in preparation for eliminating Bozkurt. On the instructions of Selim, Ali occupied Dulkadirid-controlled Bozok in the winter and there beheaded Bozkurt's son, Suleiman. Selim granted Ali the newly seized province as the Sanjak of Bozok. When Bozkurt complained to the Mamluks, the Mamluk sultan urged Selim to dismiss Ali from his positions in May 1515. Selim responded by requesting the Mamluks to install Ali on the Dulkadirid throne. Qansuh reminded Selim of the actions of Ali's father, Shah Suwar, against the Mamluks and rejected Ali's ascension. Qansuh soon realized that the Dulkadirid realm was lost for the Mamluks and proposed to Selim to instead divide the realm among themselves. Selim fiercely objected and hinted that he would attempt to conquer the entire Mamluk Sultanate. While the diplomatic traffic between the two regional powers was going on, the Dulkadirids destroyed the supply stores of the Ottoman army, which resulted in the starvation of numerous horses and a great reduction of the Ottoman military power.

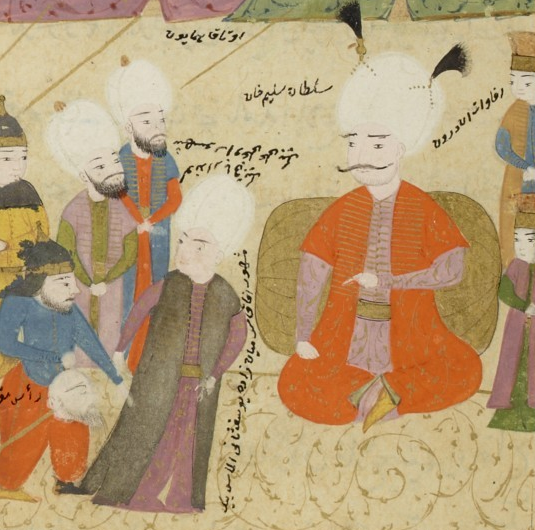
Miniature from Tadj ut-Tewarikh depicting the moment Bozkurt's severed head is presented to Selim I

A 30,000-strong army under Sinan Pasha, the beylerbey of Rumelia, departed for Elbistan from Sivas on 5 June 1515. Bozkurt once again transferred his harem and treasury to Mount Turna. Thirty thousand Dulkadirid troops faced the Ottoman military on 13 June 1515 at Ördekli, located near Göksun. Upon Ali's invitation, some of the Turkmen lords who had once been loyal to his father Shah Suwar changed sides. During the battle, one of the Ottoman soldiers noticed Bozkurt with his extravagant dress and lunged at him. After killing Bozkurt, the soldier presented his head to Sinan Pasha. When they realized their leader was dead, most of the Dulkadirid troops deserted Bozkurt's four sons and brother Abdurrazaq, and fled to the mountains. Among numerous casualties, one of Bozkurt's sons and 30 chieftains died in battle, while Bozkurt's remaining relatives, including his consorts, were captured. Bozkurt's head was presented to Selim in Göksun. Selim sent the heads of Bozkurt, his vizier, and one of his sons to Cairo. Ali was installed as the new ruler of the Dulkadir, disregarding Qansuh's request to leave a portion of the realm to Bozkurt's offspring. The khutbah (Friday sermon) was read in Selim's name as a declaration of the Ottoman overlordship over the Dulkadirids. Bozkurt's tomb is located in the nearby village of Gökçeli.

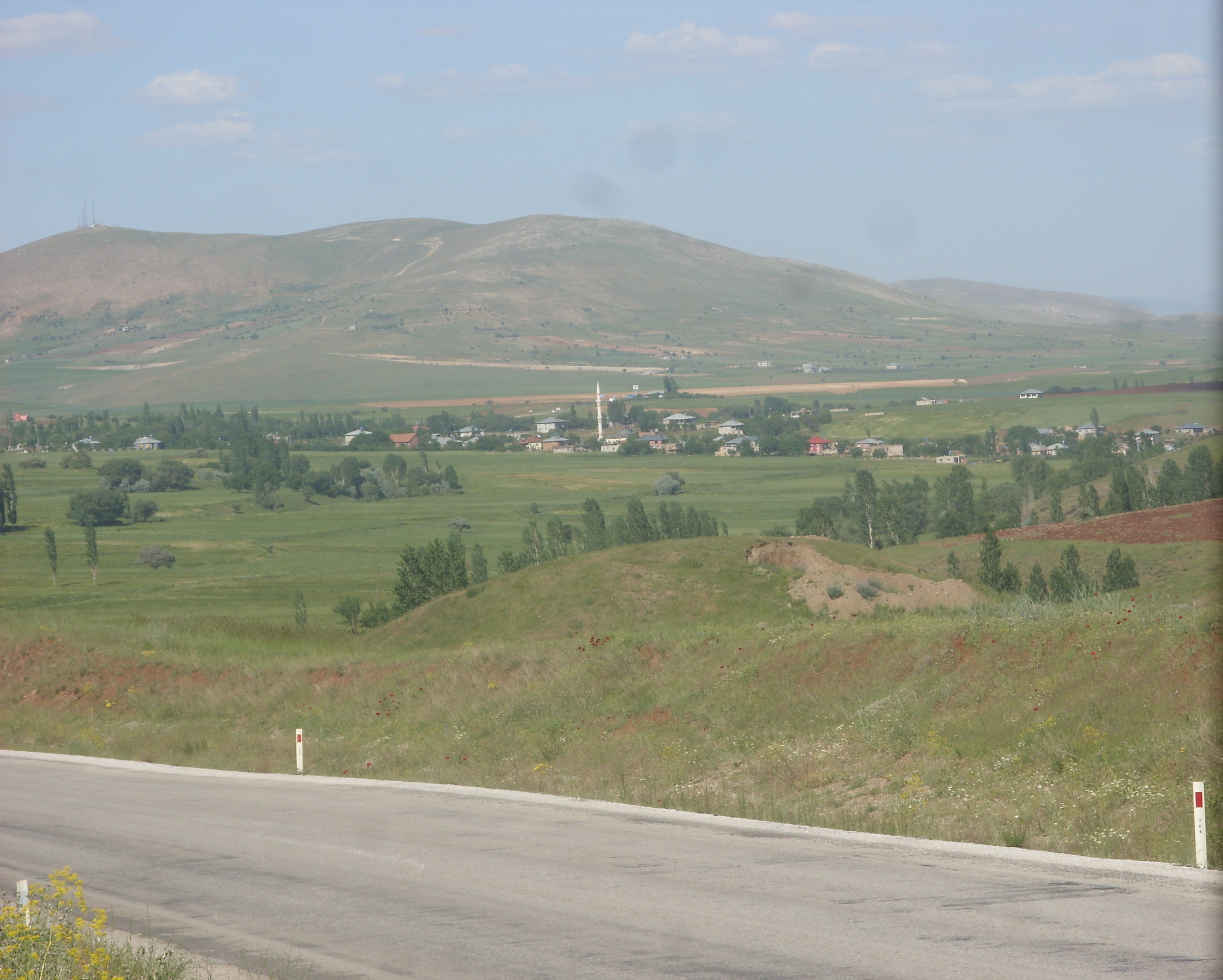
A view of Ördekli from 2011.

== Administration ==
The Ala al-Dawla Kanunname is the only known code of law from the Dulkadirid rule. It implemented the timar (land-grant) system identical to its use in the Ottoman Empire. It consisted of the penal and land laws of the realm, combining sharia (Islamic law) and local customary law. Bozkurt held iqta' (Islamic tax-farms) that lay outside his realm in Mamluk territory to the south near Aleppo, which signified the importance of the Dulkadirids as an ally, but these holdings and the iqta' system overall would be uprooted by the Ottomans following Bozkurt's death. During his rule, Bozkurt came to be known by several titles. A vakfiye (inscription) from 1500 and Ottoman tahrir defters (cadastral surveys) refer to him as a sultan. The epigraph of the Grand Mosque of Marash mentions him as the Malik al-Adil (lit. 'just king'), Nur al-Dawla (lit. 'light of the state'), Ghawth al-Millah (lit. 'scholar of the nation'), Husam al-Din (lit. 'sword of the religion'), Amir al-Mu'minin (lit. 'emir of the believers'; originally a caliphal title). Several towns, such as Aintab, enjoyed peace until his ousting in 1515.

== Patronage ==
Bozkurt left several architectural marks in his realm. These included:

In Marash:

- Hatuniye Külliye, built between 1500 and 1509 for Bozkurt's consort Shamsa Khatun
- Imaret-i Nebeyiye
- Buyuk Baghdadiye Medrese
- Tash (Rad) Medrese
- Seyyid Mazlum Zaviye
- Buyuk Baghdad (Katib) Han
- Bektutiye Mosque, built in 1500
- Yum Dede Türbe
- The Old Bedesten
- Marash Bazaar

In Elbistan:

- Ummet Baba Türbe, Masjid, Zawiya
- The Old Mosque

In Aintab:

- A water reservoir
- Alaüddevle Mosque

== Family ==
Bozkurt was married to his paternal uncle Rustam Beg's daughter Shamsa Khatun (died 1509). Bozkurt's sons included:

- Shahruh (died 1510), Dulkadirid sanjak-bey of Kırşehir, died in battle against the Safavids
- Turak (or Durak), ruler of Hisn Mansur
- Suleiman (died 1515), Ottoman sanjak-bey of Bozok, executed by the Ottomans
- Erdivane
- Kasim, nicknamed Saru Kaplan (lit. 'yellow tiger' in Turkish),
- Mehmed,
- Ahmed (died 1509), died in battle against the Safavids.

Bozkurt's daughters included:

- Ayşe Gülbahar Hatun (d. 1505), married the Ottoman Sultan Bayezid II c. 1467,
- Beglu (or Benlu) Khatun, married the Aq Qoyunlu ruler Murad
- Daughter married to the Mamluk commander Uzbek's son,
- Daughter married to Kaitmaz, the son of Amir Beg, Aq Qoyunlu official
- Iklime Khatun (d. 1549)

== Bibliography ==
- Carrafa, Giovanni Battista (1572). Dell'historie del regno di Napoli (in Italian). Naples: Appresso Giuseppe Cacchij.
- Dryselius, Erlandus (1694). Luna Turcica, eller Turkeske Mäne, anwijsandes lika som uti an spegel (in Swedish). Jönköping.
- Fleet, Kate; Faroqhi, Suraiya N., eds. (12 November 2012). The Cambridge History of Turkey: Volume 2, The Ottoman Empire as a World Power, 1453–1603. Cambridge University Press. ISBN 9781316175545. OCLC 852712564.
- Gökhan, İlyas (June 2012). Kabakcı, Cevdet; Yakar, Serdar (eds.). Dulkadir Beyliği Hanedanı Mensupları ile Komşu Devlet ve Beylik Hanedan Mensupları Arasında Yapılan Siyasi Evlilikler [Political Marriages Arranged Between the Dynasty of the Beylik of Dulkadir and Members of the Dynasties of the Neighboring States and Beyliks] (PDF). Uluslararası Dulkadir Beyliği Sempozyumu. Kahramanmaraş Municipality. pp. 265–290. ISBN 978-605-86941-2-5.
- Har-El, Shai (1995). Struggle for Domination in the Middle East: The Ottoman-Mamluk War, 1485-91. E.J. Brill. ISBN 9004101802. OCLC 624096003.
- Krusínski, Judas Thaddeus (1728). The History of the Revolution of Persia. London: S. Aris.
- Özkarcı, Mehmet (June 2012). Kabakcı, Cevdet; Yakar, Serdar (eds.). Dulkadir Beyliği Mimarîsine Bakış [A View of the Architecture of the Beylik of Dulkadir] (PDF). Uluslararası Dulkadir Beyliği Sempozyumu. Kahramanmaraş Municipality. pp. 21–74. ISBN 978-605-86941-2-5.
- Öztuna, Yılmaz (2005). Devletler ve hanedanlar: Türkiye (1074-1990) (in Turkish). Ministry of Culture. ISBN 9751704693. OCLC 949531568.
- Peirce, Leslie (2003). Morality Tales: Law and Gender in the Ottoman Court of Aintab. University of California Press. ISBN 9780520228924. OCLC 52471062.
- Savory, R. M. (1984). "ʿAlā-al-Dawla Ḏu'l-Qadar". In Yarshater, Ehsan (ed.). Encyclopædia Iranica. Vol. I/7: Ahriman–Alafrank. London and New York: Routledge & Kegan Paul. pp. 771–772. ISBN 978-0-71009-096-6.
- Venzke, Margaret L. (2000). "The Case of a Dulgadir-Mamluk Iqṭāʿ: A Re-Assessment of the Dulgadir Principality and Its Position within the Ottoman-Mamluk Rivalry". Journal of the Economic and Social History of the Orient. 43 (3): 399–474. doi:10.1163/156852000511349. JSTOR 3632448.
- Venzke, Margaret L. (2017). "Dulkadir". In Fleet, Kate; Krämer, Gudrun; Matringe, Denis; Nawas, John; Rowson, Everett (eds.). Encyclopaedia of Islam (3rd ed.). Brill Online. doi:10.1163/1573-3912_ei3_COM_27743. ISSN 1873-9830.
- Yinanç, Refet (1989). Dulkadir Beyliği (in Turkish). Ankara: Turkish Historical Society Press. ISBN 9751601711. OCLC 21676736.
- Yüksel Muslu, Cihan (25 July 2014). The Ottomans and the Mamluks: Imperial Diplomacy and Warfare in the Islamic World. I.B.Tauris. ISBN 9780857735805. OCLC 873828839.
