= List of places of worship in Gaziantep =

This is a list of places of worship in Gaziantep, a city in south-central Turkey.

== Historical mosques ==
Name	Image	Location	Opened	Notes
Ağa Mosque			1500s (Note: Rebuilt c. 1799 – c. 1800.)	
Ahmed Çelebi Mosque			1672	
Alaüddevle Mosque			Mamluk period (Note: Prayer-hall rebuilt in 1901.)	
Alaybey Mosque			late 1500s	
Ali Nacar Mosque			Mamluk period (Note: Rebuilt in 1816.)	
Ayşe Bacı Mosque			early 1700s	
Bostancı Mosque			Medieval era (Note: The mihrab and portal date back to 1574. The portico may be from the Ottoman period.)	
Boyacı Mosque			1357 (Note: Repaired in 1575, when the prayer-hall was rebuilt.)	
Esenbek Mosque			Mamluk period	
Eyüpoğlu Mosque			Mamluk period (Note: Almost complete reconstruction in 1947.)	
Hacı Nasır Mosque			late 1600s	
Handaliye Mosque			1500s	
Hüseyin Paşa Mosque			early 1700s	
Karagöz Mosque				
Kara Tarla Mosque			1500s (Note: Repaired about 1775.)	
Kozanlı Mosque			late 1600s	
Liberation Mosque				Originally Surp Asdvadzadzin Church.
Mehmed Nuri Pasha Mosque			late 1700s (Note: Minaret built in 1785.)	
Ömeriye Mosque			1210	
Ömer Şeyh Mosque			1698	
Şeyh Fethullah Mosque			mid 1500s	
Şirvani Mosque			Unknown (Note: Repaired in 1681.)	
Tahtani Mosque			1500s (Note: Rebuilt in 1578.)	

== Historical churches ==
Name	Image	Location	Denomination	Opened	Notes
The Anglican Church			Anglican	late 1800s	Demolished.
Chapel of Saint Elias			Armenian Apostolic	1600s	Converted into mosque and bathhouse during the Ottoman period.
The First Protestant Church		Kayacık		1855	Demolished or turned into cinema.
Kendirli Church			Latin	1905	
The Second Protestant Church		Hayık		1868	Fate unclear.
Surp Asdvadzadzin Cathedral			Armenian Apostolic	1893	Present-day Liberation Mosque.
Surp Bedros Church			Armenian Catholic	1862	

== Historical synagogues ==
- Gaziantep Synagogue

== Bibliography ==
- Cephanecigil, Gül (July 2015). "Preliminary remarks on the Late Ottoman Churches in Aintab". ITU Journal of the Faculty of Architecture. 12 (2): 131–143.
- Sarafean, Georg Avedis (1957). A Briefer History of Aintab A Concise History of the Cultural, Religious, Educational, Political, Industrial and Commercial Life of the Armenians of Aintab. Boston: Union of the Armenians of Aintab. p. 11.
- Sinclair, T. A. (1987). Eastern Turkey: An Architectural & Archaeological Survey. Vol. IV.
