= Battle of Turnadağ =

1515 battle

- Part of Ottoman–Mamluk War (1516–17) Campaigns of Selim I
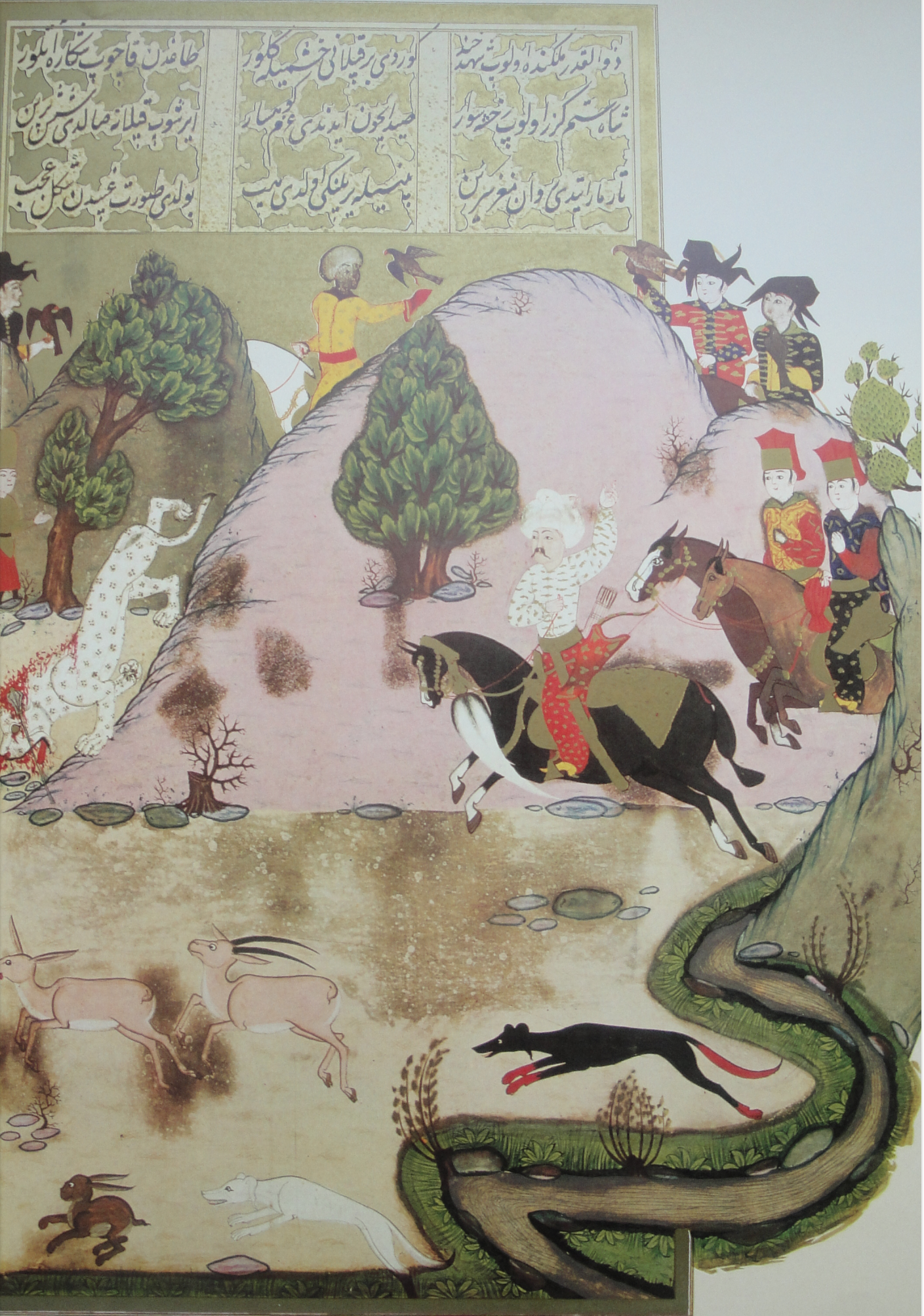
- Sultan Selim is hunting tigers while marching on the Beylik of Dulkadir.
Date	June 13, 1515
Location	Göksun and Nurhak Mountain; Kahramanmaraş Province, Turkey
Result	Ottoman victory: Annexation of the Beylik of Dulkadir

Belligerents
Ottoman Empire	Beylik of Dulkadir

Commanders and leaders
Selim I Hadim Sinan Pasha	Ala al-Dawla Bozkurt †

Strength
40,000	Unknown

The Battle of Turnadağ was an engagement between the forces of the Ottoman Empire and the Beylik of Dulkadir of Turkey in 1515.

== Background ==
The Beylik of Dulkadir was a semi-independent Anatolian beylik under the sovereignty of Mamluk Egypt. Its territory bordered in the north to the Ottoman Empire. In 1514, Ottoman sultan Selim I, nicknamed Yavuz, literally "Grim" or "Inflexible", waged a war against Ismail I of the Safavids in Iran. His campaign route was close to Dulkadir border, and Selim I asked Bozkurt of Dulkadir to participate in the campaign. But Bozkurt refused to participate using the pretext of his old age. Also some tribes under his command disturbed supply units of the Ottoman Army and constantly raided its supply lines.

== After the campaign ==
After his campaign against the Safavids in Iran, Selim I decided to end the Beylik. Instead of returning to Istanbul, he waited in Central Anatolia with the main army and sent a force of 40,000 men under the command of Hadim Sinan Pasha, one of his Bosnian viziers to conquer Dulkadir territory. Ali Bey, a relative of Bozkurt, who had previously defected to the Ottomans, was with Sinan as a guide.

== The battle ==
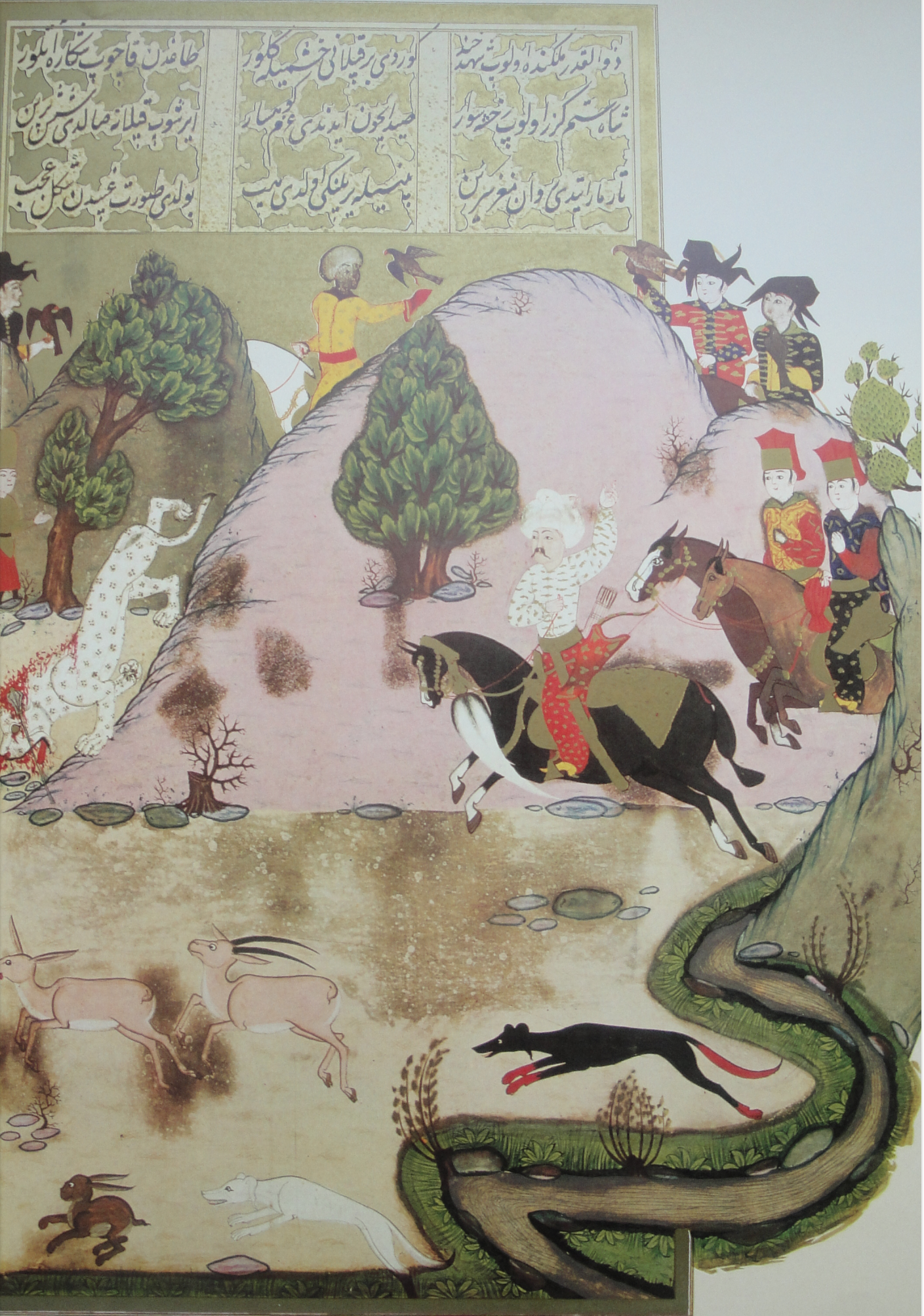
Sultan Selim is hunting tigers while marching on the Beylik of Dulkadir.

Early fighting took place on 13 June 1515 close to Göksun, what is today a town in Kahramanmaraş Province in Turkey. The Ottoman Army bombarded the forces of Dulkadir using artillery cannons and ended the battle with a cavalry charge. Although the Ottomans were victorious, Bozkurt was able to escape to southeast. The final clash was in Turnadağ, a mountain range now called Nurhak in Kahramanmaraş Province. At the end of the battle, Dulkadir army was totally defeated. Both Bozkurt and his sons were killed in the battle.

== Aftermath ==
After the battle, Beylik of Dulkadir ceased to exist. It was converted to an Ottoman sanjak, (Ottoman administrative unit). The first governor of the sanjak became Ali Bey of the Dulkadir. Hadim Sinan Pasha was promoted to be the grand vizier. The next year, Selim I waged a war against Egypt, and Egypt as well as Syria and Palestine came under the Ottoman rule.
