= Hışva Han =

16th-century inn in Gaziantep, Turkey

- Entrance to Hışva Han before restoration, 2009
- Alternative names: Lala Mustafa Pasha Inn

General information
- Status: In use as a hotel and restaurant
- Type: Historic inn (han)
- Architectural style: Ottoman architecture
- Location: Karagöz neighbourhood, Şahinbey, Handan Bey Sokak, No. 23/1, Gaziantep, Turkey
- Named for: Lala Mustafa Pasha
- Completed: Between 1563 and 1577 (estimated)
- Opened: August 2016 (reopened)
- Renovated: 2012 to 2015

Technical details
- Material: Black and white cut stone
- Floor count: 1

Website
- hsvhn.com

Hışva Han, also known as Lala Mustafa Pasha Inn, is a historic Ottoman inn in the Şahinbey district of Gaziantep, Turkey, south of Gaziantep Castle. The oldest surviving inn in the city centre, it was commissioned by Lala Mustafa Pasha in the second half of the 16th century. Although the building has no construction inscription, it is believed to have been built between 1563 and 1577.

Part of the Lala Mustafa Pasha külliye, Hışva Han is a single-storey building with a central courtyard, constructed from black and white dressed stone. Originally used for trade, accommodation and storage, it was restored by Gaziantep Metropolitan Municipality and reopened in August 2016 as a complex housing a hotel, restaurant and shops.
