= Shahruh Mehmed =

Dulkadirid sanjak-bey of Kırşehir from 1500 to 1510

Shahruh Beg

Dulkadirid sanjak-bey of Kırşehir
- Reign: 1500–1510

Dulkadirid sanjak-bey of Bozok
- Successor: Suleiman
- Consort: Shah Sultan
- Issue: Mehmed; Malik Arslan; Ali
- Royal house: Dulkadir
- Father: Ala al-Dawla Bozkurt
- Religion: Islam

Shahruh Mehmed Beg (died 1510) was the Dulkadirid sanjak-bey of Kırşehir from 1500 until his death. He was the son of Ala al-Dawla Bozkurt, Beg of Dulkadir, who ruled from 1480 to 1515.

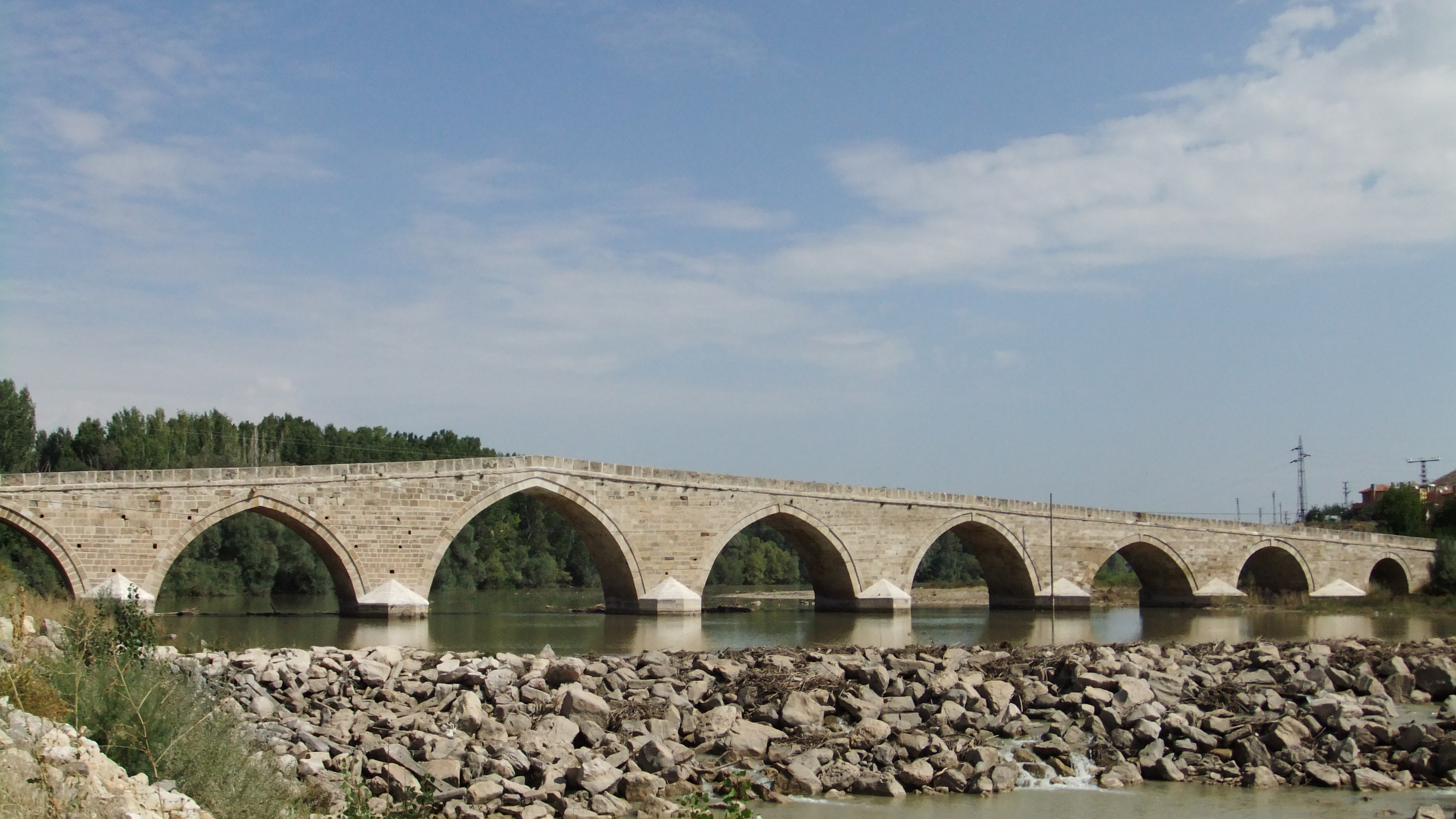
The Shahruh Bridge in Sarıoğlan, Kayseri Province

Amid an attempt to overthrow Bozkurt, Shahruh's uncle Shah Budak blinded him in Kırşehir. Shahruh died in the spring of 1510 fighting the forces of Mohammad Khan Ustajlu, a Safavid commander, near Diyarbekir.

== Family ==
Following their father's death, Mehmed and Ali were appointed to several military positions by the Safavids. Their brother Malik Arslan was killed by Ali, who was their cousin and the ruler of Dulkadir at the time, at the Battle of Marj Dabiq on 24 August 1516.

== Bibliography ==
- Dulkadiroğlu, Hakan Türker (June 2012). Kabakcı, Cevdet; Yakar, Serdar (eds.). Tarihte Dulkadiroğlu Devleti'nin Genel Durumu ve Kayseri'de Dulkadiroğlu Hanedan Mensupları (PDF). Uluslararası Dulkadir Beyliği Sempozyumu. Kahramanmaraş Municipality. ISBN 978-605-86941-2-5.
- Har-El, Shai (1995). Struggle for Domination in the Middle East: The Ottoman-Mamluk War, 1485-91. E.J. Brill. ISBN 9004101802. OCLC 624096003.
- Venzke, Margaret L. (2017). "Dulkadir". In Fleet, Kate; Krämer, Gudrun; Matringe, Denis; Nawas, John; Rowson, Everett (eds.). Encyclopaedia of Islam (3rd ed.). Brill Online. ISSN 1873-9830.
- Yinanç, Refet (1989). Dulkadir Beyliği (in Turkish). Ankara: Turkish Historical Society Press. ISBN 9751601711. OCLC 21676736.
