= Gülbahar Hatun (mother of Selim I) =

Concubine of Sultan Bayezid II, and mother of Sultan Selim I

Ayşe Gülbahar Hatun
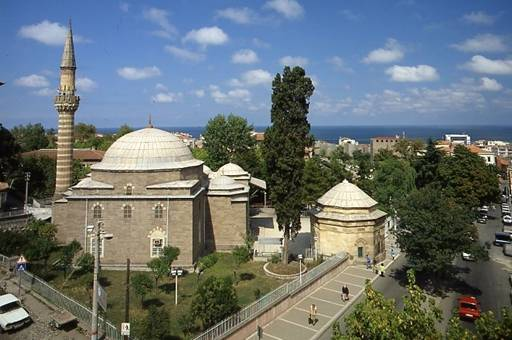
- The tomb of "Gülbahar Hatun" is located inside "Gülbahar Hatun Mosque" in Trabzon
- Died: c. 1505; Trabzon, Ottoman Empire
- Burial: Gülbahar Hatun Camii, Trabzon
- Consort of: Bayezid II
- Issue: Selim I
- Father: Alaüddevle Bozkurt Bey
- Religion: Sunni Islam

Gülbahar Hatun or Ayşe Gülbahar Hatun (Ottoman Turkish: گل بهار خاتون; c. 1453 – c. 1505), was a consort of Sultan Bayezid II and the mother of Sultan Selim I of the Ottoman Empire and the grandmother of Sultan Suleiman the Magnificent.

== Names ==
One of the oldest references Cenabî History gives the name of Selim's mother as Ayşe Hatun. According to Sicill-i Osmanî her name is Gülbahar Hatun, while Alderson gives her name Ayşe Hatun, as well.

== Origins ==
There are two different claims regarding the origin of Ayşe Gülbahar Hatun. According to one claim, she was the daughter of Alaüddevle Bozkurt Bey of the Dulkadirid Beylik and the mother of Selim I. This is the most widely accepted view. In Tarih-i Saf Tuhfetu'l Ahbab, Selim I's mother is recorded as Ayşe Hatun the wife of Bayezid II and the daughter of the Dulkadirid ruler Alaüddevle Bozkurt Bey. In the history of Cenâbî, Selim's mother is described as 'the daughter of a Turkmen bey'. According to another claim, she may have been of concubine origin, as her father’s name is recorded as “Abdüssamed” in the sources. Some historians suggest she was a Pontic Greek from the village of Vayvara (south of the Sumela Monastery).

== Life ==
She entered Bayezid's harem around 1469 at Amasya. When Bayezid was still a şehzade and the governor of Amasya sanjak when she gave birth to Selim I in 1470. When Mehmed the Conqueror died in 1481, Bayezid moved to Constantinople, the capital of the Ottoman Empire, along with his family to ascend the throne.

According to Turkish tradition, all princes were expected to work as provincial governors (Sanjak-bey) as a part of their training. Mothers of princes were responsible for the proper behaviour of their sons in their provincial posts. When Selim was sent to Trabzon sanjak, Gülbahar accompanied him.

However, she was not recognized as a Valide Hatun because she died in 1505 before Selim's accession to the throne. Her tomb is located in Gülbahar Hatun Mosque, Trabzon. It was built in 1514 in honour of his mother and was restored in 1885.

== Issue ==
By Bayezid II, Ayşe Gülbahar had a son:

- Selim I (10 October 1470 – 22 September 1520). He became sultan after dethroning his father and defeating his half-brothers Ahmed and Korkut.

== See also ==
- Ottoman Empire
- Ottoman family tree
- Ottoman dynasty
- Line of succession to the Ottoman throne
- Ottoman family tree (simplified)

== Bibliography ==
- Sakaoğlu, Necdet [in Turkish] (2008). Bu mülkün kadın sultanları: Vâlide sultanlar, hâtunlar, hasekiler, kadınefendiler, sultanefendiler. Oğlak publications. ISBN 978-975-329-623-6.
