= Ali of Dulkadir =

Beg of Dulkadir from 1515 to 1522

Ali Beg
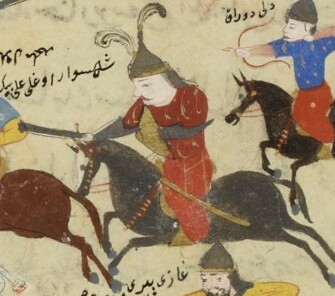
- Miniature from Hoja Sa'd al-Din's Taj al-Tewarih depicting Ali as he fights the Celali rebels.

Beg of Dulkadir
- Reign: 13 June 1515 – 1522
- Predecessor: Ala al-Dawla Bozkurt

Ottoman Sanjak-bey of Chirmen
- Reign: 1512

Ottoman Sanjak-bey of Kayseri
- Reign: 1514–1515
- Died: 1522; Artukova, Ottoman Empire
- Issue: Saru Arslan; Uways; Divaneh Veled; Pir Ahmed; Iskender; Hudabende
- House: Dulkadir
- Father: Shah Suwar
- Religion: Islam

Shahsuwaroghlu Ali Beg (died 1522) (Note: Turkish: Şehsüvaroğlu Ali Bey; Ottoman Turkish: شهسوار اوغلی علی بك, romanized: Şehsüvâr-oġlı ‘Alî Beg) was the ruler of Dulkadir from 13 June 1515 until his death. Ali was the son of Shah Suwar (r. 1466–1472), one of the previous Begs of Dulkadir. Following his father's execution by the Mamluk Sultanate, Ali fled to the Ottoman Empire, where he served in several positions, administering parts of the country and leading the Ottoman army during their fight against Safavid Iran, specifically the Battle of Chaldiran. When Ali's uncle and the ruler of Dulkadir, Ala al-Dawla Bozkurt (r. 1480–1515), was involved in a conflict with the Ottoman state, the latter chose Ali as their puppet to replace Bozkurt, who sided with the Mamluk Sultanate. On 13 June 1515, Bozkurt was killed, and Ali rose to the Dulkadirid throne.

While the Mamluks were in preparations to topple Ali and install his uncle, the Ottoman Sultan Selim I (r. 1512–1520) initiated a war to end the Mamluk rule in Syria and Egypt. Ali led part of the Ottoman forces during the war, including the Battles of Marj Dabiq and Ridaniya in 1516 and 1517, respectively, both of which resulted in Ottoman victory that contributed to the total annexation of the Mamluk realm. Two years later, Ali played a significant role in the suppression of the Celali rebellions in Ottoman Anatolia as well as the subdual of Janbirdi al-Ghazali in Syria in 1521. Despite his continued loyalty and service to the Ottomans, rumors of Ali's unjust rule and his killing of Ottoman officials while they were inspecting these rumors, allowed his rival Ferhad Pasha, the beylerbey of Rumelia, to design Ali's assassination. Ali and his close family were exterminated during a feast by Ferhad Pasha. Ali's death allowed the intended Ottoman seizure of the Dulkadirid realm and marked the end of his dynasty's rule.

== Background ==
The Beylik of Dulkadir was founded by Zayn al-Din Qaraja (r. 1337–1353), a local Turkmen lord, as a client state of the Mamluk Sultanate, in southern Anatolia and northern Syria. Qaraja eventually rebelled against the Mamluks and was executed in 1353. The conflict between the Dulkadirids and the Mamluks persisted with the consecutive rule of his sons Ghars al-Din Khalil (r. 1353–1386) and Shaban Suli (r. 1386–1398), who were both assassinated on the orders of the Mamluk Sultan Barquq (r. 1382–1389, 1390–1399). With the reigns of Ali's great grandfather, Mehmed (r. 1399–1442), and grandfather, Suleiman (r. 1442–1454), the Dulkadirids attempted to forge amicable relations both with the Ottoman state and the Mamluk Sultanate.

Malik Arslan's (r. 1454–1465) death marked the start of an era of struggle between his brothers. Shah Budak (r. 1465–1466, 1472–1480) initially claimed the throne having gathered Mamluk support. Shortly after, he was forced out of the throne by Shah Suwar (r. 1466–1473) backed by the Ottomans. Shah Suwar was involved in a persistent dispute with the Mamluks throughout his reign but lost the support of the Ottomans, who disapproved of his disloyalty. The Mamluks captured Shah Suwar and executed him, reinstating Shah Budak as the head of the state. In 1480, Shah Budak's rule disintegrated again as his brother Ala al-Dawla Bozkurt (r. 1480–1515) ousted him with powerful Ottoman support. Ala al-Dawla's reign encompassed several conflicts between the Safavid Iran, the Ottoman Empire, and the Mamluk Sultanate.

== Rise to power ==
Following his father's execution, Ali had taken refuge under the Ottoman Sultan Bayezid II (r. 1481–1512). After Selim I's (r. 1512–1520) ascended to the throne, he appointed Ali as the sanjak-bey of Chirmen. Ali took part in Selim's campaign against Safavid Iran. As he was stationed in Erzincan, Selim dispatched Ali to explore the enemy forces. Ali caught several expeditionary Qizilbash troops. After his cousin Pirbende presented their heads to Selim in Sakallu, near Eleşkird, on 18 August 1514, Ali received a reward of 3 thousand florins and the sword of Hersekzade Ahmed Pasha. Five days later, Ali participated in the Battle of Chaldiran and pursued the fleeing Safavid forces.

In November, Selim appointed Ali as the sanjak-bey of Kayseri, a more valued position than that in Chirmen, on the border with the Dulkadirids in preparation to eliminate Bozkurt. As ordered by Selim, Ali occupied the Dulkadirid-controlled Sanjak of Bozok in the winter and beheaded Bozkurt's son, Suleiman. Selim granted Ali the newly seized province of Bozok. Upon a complaint from Bozkurt, the Mamluk sultan urged Selim to dismiss Ali from his positions in May 1515. Selim contrarily requested the Mamluks to install Ali on the Dulkadirid throne. The Mamluk Sultan Qansuh al-Ghawri reminded Selim of Ali's father Shah Suwar's past deeds against the Mamluks, rejecting Ali's ascension. Qansuh soon realized that the Dulkadirid realm was lost for the Mamluks and proposed Selim share the realm with the Ottomans. Selim fiercely objected and hinted that he would attempt at conquering all of the Mamluk Sultanate. During the diplomatic traffic between the two states, the Dulkadirids destroyed the accommodations of the Ottoman army, which resulted in a great reduction of the Ottomans' military power.

A 30 thousand-strong army under Sinan Pasha, the beylerbey of Rumelia, departed for Elbistan on 5 June 1515. Bozkurt transferred his harem and treasury to Mount Turna. Thirty thousand Dulkadirid troops faced the Ottoman military on 13 June 1515 near Ördekli, located between Andırın and Göksun. Upon Ali's invitation, some of the Turkmen lords who were once loyal to his father Shah Suwar changed sides. During the skirmish, one of the Ottoman soldiers noticed Bozkurt in his extravagant dress. The soldier lunged at Bozkurt killing him and presented his head to Sinan Pasha. Much of the Dulkadirid troops deserted Bozkurt's four sons and brother Abdurrazaq, and fled to the mountains when they realized their leader was dead. Among numerous casualties, one of Bozkurt's sons and 30 chieftains died in battle, while Bozkurt's remaining relatives, including his consorts, were caught. Bozkurt's head was presented to Selim in Göksun. Selim sent Bozkurt's, his vizier's, and one of his son's heads to Cairo. Ali was installed as the new ruler of Dulkadir, contrary to Qansuh's request to leave a portion of the realm to Bozkurt's offspring. The khutbah (sermon) was read in Selim's name as a declaration of the Ottoman overlordship over the Dulkadirids. Ali was granted a Mamluk-type iqta' (Islamic tax-farm) by the Ottomans in Aleppo Sanjak inherited from Bozkurt.

== Early reign ==
Ali's rise elicited several revolts led by his relatives, especially the sons of his cousin, Shahruh Mehmed. Ali extinguished the revolt after he captured Ahmed, the most influential figure among the rebels, in the Zamantu Castle. Although Ali sent numerous gifts to Qansuh in February 1516, the Mamluks were unresponsive to Ali's offer to have amicable relations. Ali's uncle Abd al-Razzaq and cousins had fled to Egypt, and after receiving eight thousand dinars from the Mamluks, the Dulkadirid princes departed Cairo on 18 March to gather an army to topple Ali. On the other hand, Ali was invested in proving his loyalty to the Ottomans. He sent a two thousand-strong support force to Bıyıklı Mehmed Pasha, who set out to Diyarbekir to break the siege headed by Qara Khan, the Safavid-appointed governor who was not allowed to govern by the city's locals. In April 1516, Ali's forces participated in the Battle of Kochhisar, where Qara Khan died, and Ottoman rule was restored.

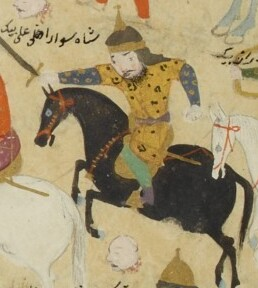
Ali fighting at the Battle of Kochhisar in a miniature from Hoja Sa'd al-Din's Taj al-Tewarih.

== Ottoman–Mamluk War ==
Qansuh arrived in Aleppo on 11 July in preparation to attack the Dulkadirids as he expected Selim to be busy fighting the Safavids in the east. In reality, Selim was planning to invade the Mamluk realm. In a letter to the Mamluk sultan, Selim called for their support for Ali against his relatives and proposed to return the Dulkadirids to Mamluk overlordship if the Mamluks remain impartial to the Ottoman–Safavid dispute. Selim traveled to Elbistan, hiding his intentions to campaign against the Mamluks. Ali guided the Ottoman army south until Aintab. When Qansuh learned of the Ottoman army's arrival in Syria, he unilaterally recognized Abd al-Razzaq as the ruler of Dulkadir and dispatched him north with a five thousand-strong force under his command. Qansuh and the Mamluk army followed him. The Ottomans and the Mamluk armies engaged in a battle near Dabiq on 24 August 1516. Ali was positioned on the right wing of the Ottoman army along with Zeynel Pasha, the beylerbey of Anatolia. Abd al-Razzaq and his nephew Shahruh's son, Malik Arslan, were located on the opposite side, or the left wing, of the Mamluk army. Ali killed Malik Arslan as soon as the fight began. During the skirmish that resulted in an Ottoman victory, Qansuh died of a stroke, and Abd al-Razzaq was captured.

Ali continued to lead the advance forces and advocated for Selim to attack Cairo. Following the fall of Gaza, Ali and eight thousand cavalry under his command reached Bilbeis in Egypt on 20 January 1517. Contrary to his viziers' recommendation for a direct attack, Selim followed Ali's advice to march on Ridaniya from the direction of the hill of Mokattam. At the Battle of Ridaniya, on 24 January the same year, Ali was once again positioned on the right wing of the army. Although several Ottoman commanders, including one of Ali's sons, were killed during the skirmish, Ali was able to infiltrate the city of Cairo and participated in the clashes in the city streets. On 13 April, Ali hanged the Mamluk Sultan Tuman bay II (r. 1516–17) at Bab Zuweila in retribution for his father's earlier execution at the same spot.

== Celali and Ghazali rebellions ==
Jalal (or Celal), dubbed as Shah Veli, was a Turkmen who owned timar (land grant) near Turhal and initiated a major rebellion in 1519 gathering numerous Qizilbash, including relatives of Ali. In the region of Bozok, Jalal sacked the home of Ali's son, Uways, and defeated Shadi Pasha, the local beylerbey, in Zile, where the latter was preparing to form a resistance against the rebels. Jalal's temporary victory against the Ottomans helped his fame and the number of his supporters grow. Selim tasked Ali and several Ottoman governors to subdue Jalal. On 24 April 1519, Ali participated in a battle lasting from dawn to dusk that killed much of the Qizilbash forces and captured their families. Although their leader, Jalal, managed to escape, he was pursued by Uways and was finally caught by Yörüks of the Junkar tribe. While Jalal was being transported to be presented to Shadi Pasha, Uways abducted and brought Jalal to his father. Ali beheaded Jalal and sent his head to Selim, which prompted jealousy among the Ottoman governors, especially the Rumelian beylerbey Ferhad Pasha.

Shortly after Selim's death in 1520, Janbirdi al-Ghazali, originally the beylerbey of Damascus, revolted taking advantage of the change in power. Ferhad Pasha and Ali were assigned to deal with Ghazali when the latter laid siege to Aleppo with a twenty thousand-strong force. Ali vanquished Ghazali near Aleppo before Ferhad Pasha's arrival. Ghazali retreated to Damascus, pursued by Ali and Ferhad Pasha. On 27 January 1521, the Ottoman forces killed Ghazali in Mastaba, near Damascus. Ali's growing fame with his success suppressing another revolt contributed to the animosity between him and Ferhad Pasha. Ali further guarded the eastern borders of the Ottomans during Suleiman I's (r. 1520–1566) Siege of Belgrade the same year.

== Assassination ==
In response to the rumors of Ali's cruel and unfair rule over his subjects, the Ottomans sent inspectors to the Dulkadirid realm, where they were killed by the order of Ali. Using this as a chance to defame and eliminate him, Ferhad Pasha received a firman (royal mandate) from Suleiman and traveled to Tokat. There, he invited Ali and his sons, disguising the meeting's purpose as a future campaign against the Safavids. Ali disregarded warnings from his milieu about the ominous nature of an invitation to his whole close family. He and his sons met with Ferhad Pasha in Artukova. There, Ferhad Pasha welcomed them with great interest, and they had an exquisite feast. During the feast, Ali, his four sons, (Note: They were Saru Arslan, Uways, Divaneh Veled, and Pir Ahmed.) and all of his entourage were killed. Suleiman received Ali's head in July 1522 in Çine amidst the preparations for the Siege of Rhodes. Ali was overall loyal to the Ottomans until his death. His assassination served to integrate the independent or autonomous Dulkadirid state into the Ottoman realm. After Ali's death, much of the country became part of the Dulkadir Eyalet, while the region of Bozok was administered as part of a sanjak.

== Family ==
Ali's sons included Saru Arslan, Uways, Divaneh Veled, Pir Ahmed, Iskender, and Hudabende (born 1515). Saru Arslan, Uways, Divaneh Veled, and Pir Ahmed were killed together with their father.

== Bibliography ==
- Öztuna, Yılmaz (2005). Devletler ve hanedanlar: Türkiye (1074-1990) [States and dynasties: Turkey (1074-1990)] (in Turkish). Ministry of Culture. ISBN 9751704693. OCLC 949531568.
- Peirce, Leslie (2003). Morality Tales: Law and Gender in the Ottoman Court of Aintab. University of California Press. ISBN 9780520228924. OCLC 52471062.
- Venzke, Margaret L. (2000). "The Case of a Dulgadir-Mamluk Iqṭāʿ: A Re-Assessment of the Dulgadir Principality and Its Position within the Ottoman-Mamluk Rivalry". Journal of the Economic and Social History of the Orient. 43 (3): 399–474. ISSN 0022-4995.
- Venzke, Margaret L. (2017). "Dulkadir". In Fleet, Kate; Krämer, Gudrun; Matringe, Denis; Nawas, John; Rowson, Everett (eds.). Encyclopaedia of Islam (3rd ed.). Brill Online. doi:10.1163/1573-3912_ei3_COM_27743. ISSN 1873-9830.
- Yinanç, Refet (1989). Dulkadir Beyliği [Dulkadir Principality] (in Turkish). Ankara: Turkish Historical Society Press. ISBN 9751601711. OCLC 21676736.
