= Akbirdi =

Mamluk emir (died 1499)

Akbirdi (died June 1499) was a Mamluk emir and dawatdar (head of the chancery). After Qaitbay's death (r. 1468–92), Akbirdi led an unsuccessful insurrection in Cairo, and in its aftermath, went to Syria with hopes of carving out a new state for himself. The Dulkadirid ruler Ala al-Dawla Bozkurt (r. 1480–1515) allowed Akbirdi and Aynal, the former governor of Aleppo, to stay in his realm against the wishes of the new governor of Aleppo, Janbulad. Despite Dulkadirid support, Akbirdi fled east of the Euphrates after a major defeat near Aintab in May 1498, where Aynal and two of Bozkurt's sons were killed by the Mamluk forces. Distraught by his sons' deaths, Bozkurt allowed a larger portion of the Dulkadirid army under Akbirdi's command in an attempt to seize Aleppo in October the same year. The Mamluks gifted Bozkurt a robe of honour and a diploma in exchange for withdrawing his support from Akbirdi. The latter was defeated again at Aleppo, which forced Bozkurt to reconcile with the Mamluks in May 1499. Akbirdi returned to Aleppo after the agreement but died there one month later.

== Bibliography ==
- Har-El, Shai (1995). Struggle for Domination in the Middle East: The Ottoman-Mamluk War, 1485-91. E.J. Brill. ISBN 9004101802. OCLC 624096003.
- Yinanç, Refet (1989). Dulkadir Beyliği (in Turkish). Ankara: Turkish Historical Society Press. ISBN 9751601711. OCLC 21676736.
