= Alaüddevle Mosque =

Mosque in Gaziantep, Turkey

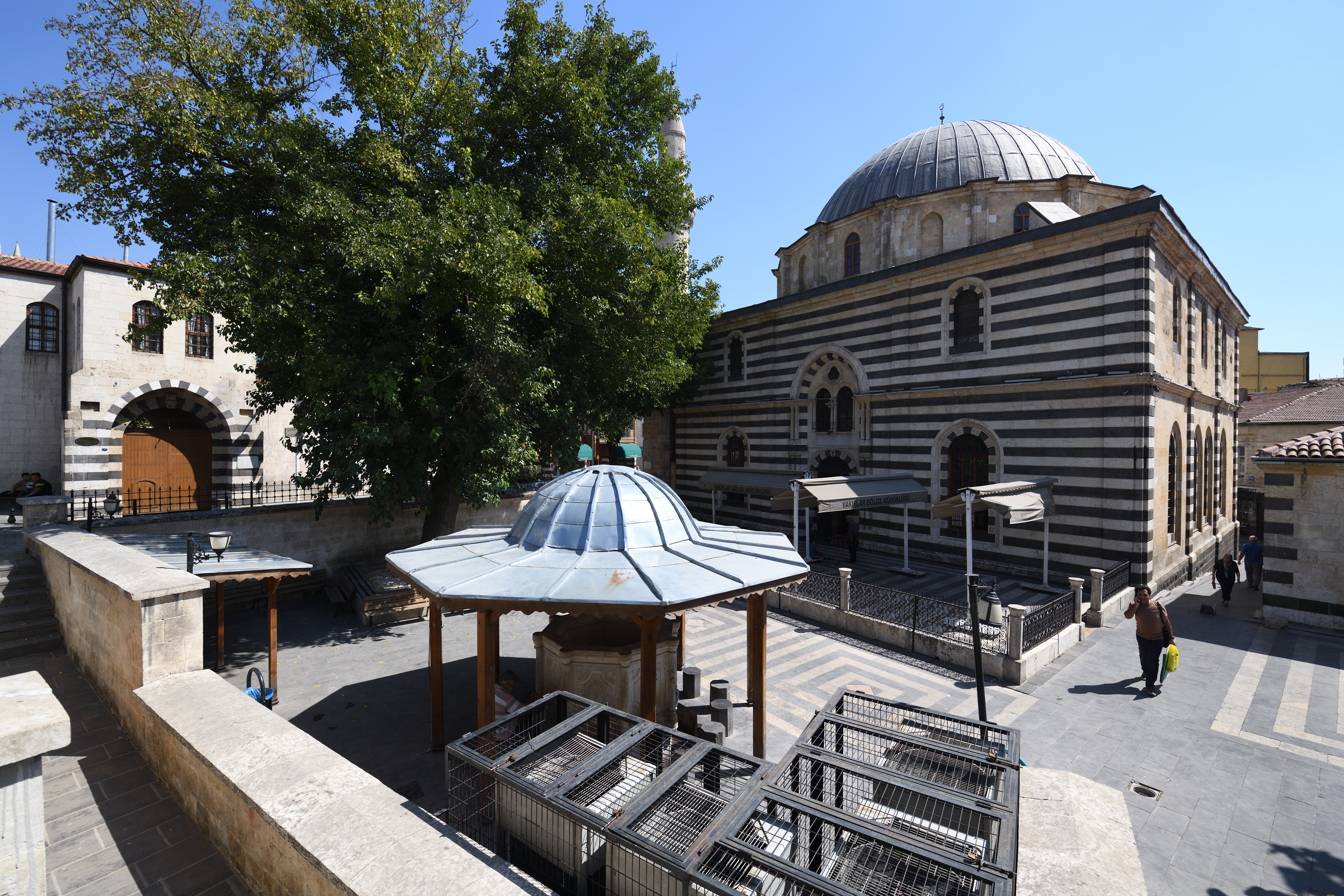
- The former mosque

- Location of the former mosque in Turkey

Religion
- Affiliation: Sunni Islam (former)
- Ecclesiastical or organizational status: Mosque
- Status: Destroyed

Location
- Location: Gaziantep
- Country: Turkey
- Interactive map of Alaüddevle Mosque
- Coordinates: 37°03′48.2″N 37°23′05.6″E

Architecture
- Architect: Armenek
- Type: Mosque architecture
- Style: Armenian; Baroque; Ottoman
- Completed: c. 1515 CE
- Destroyed: 6 February 2023

The Alaüddevle Mosque is a historical former Sunni mosque in Gaziantep built under the administration of Ala al-Dawla Bozkurt Beg of the Turkoman principality of Dulkadir, in modern-day Turkey.

== Overview ==
The mosque is thought to have been built before 1515, when Bozkurt Beg died. Its construction was overseen by Armenians; architect Armenak Effendi and foreman Kirkor. Although a mosque, it bears features of local churches. The mihrab of the mosque includes a pediment and columns.

On 6 February 2023, the mosque was damaged by two consecutive earthquakes.

== Gallery ==
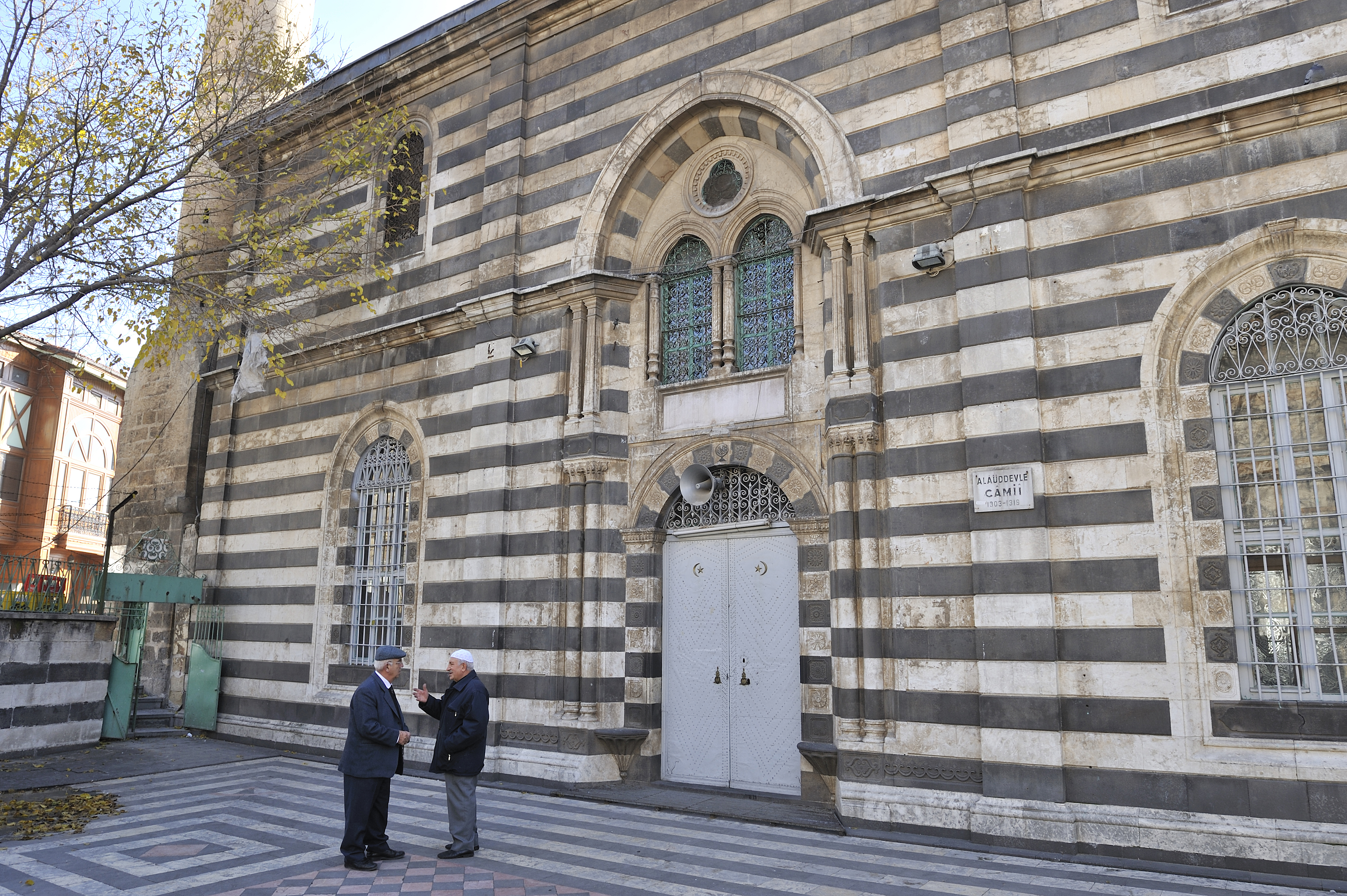
Entrance

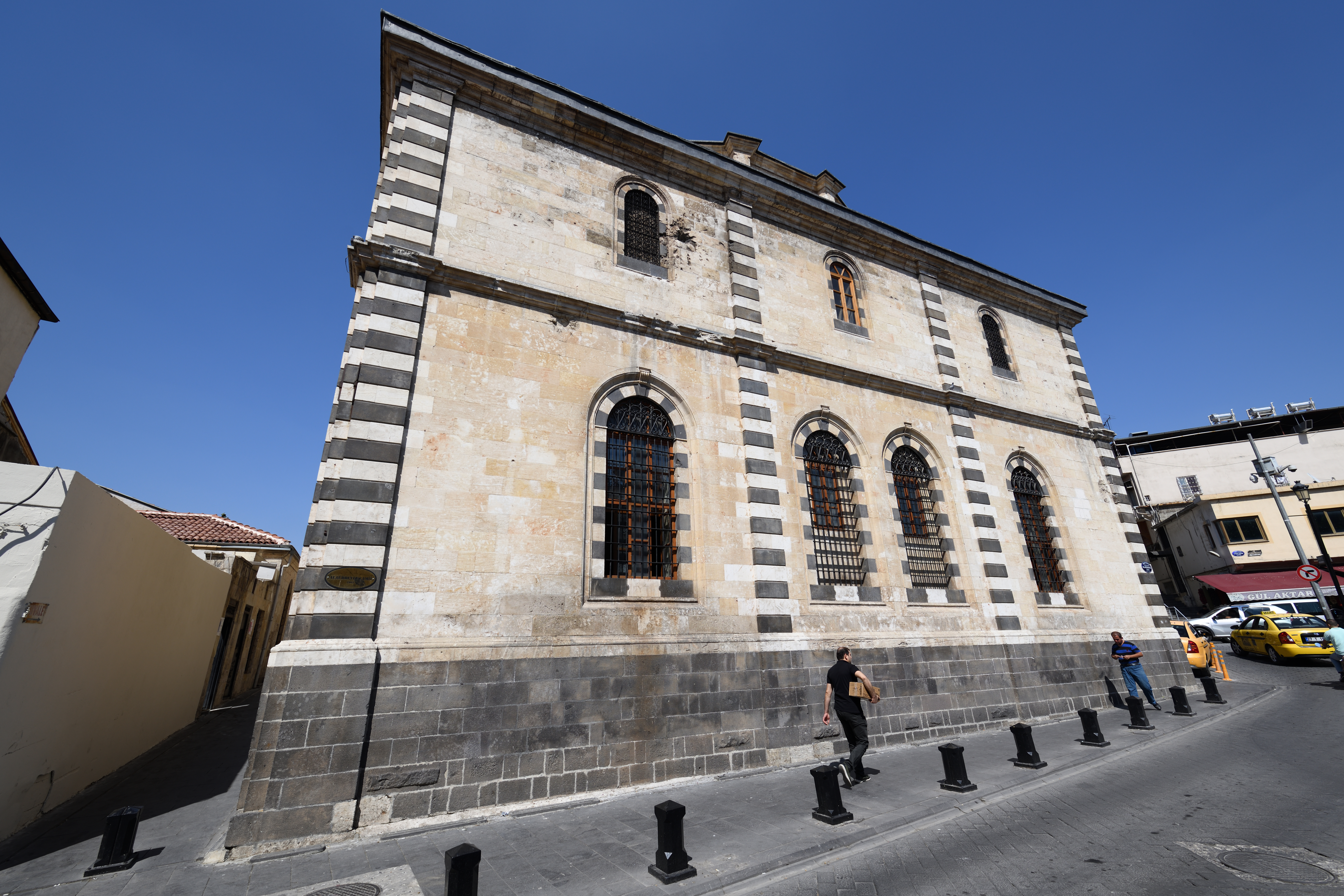
Street-side façade

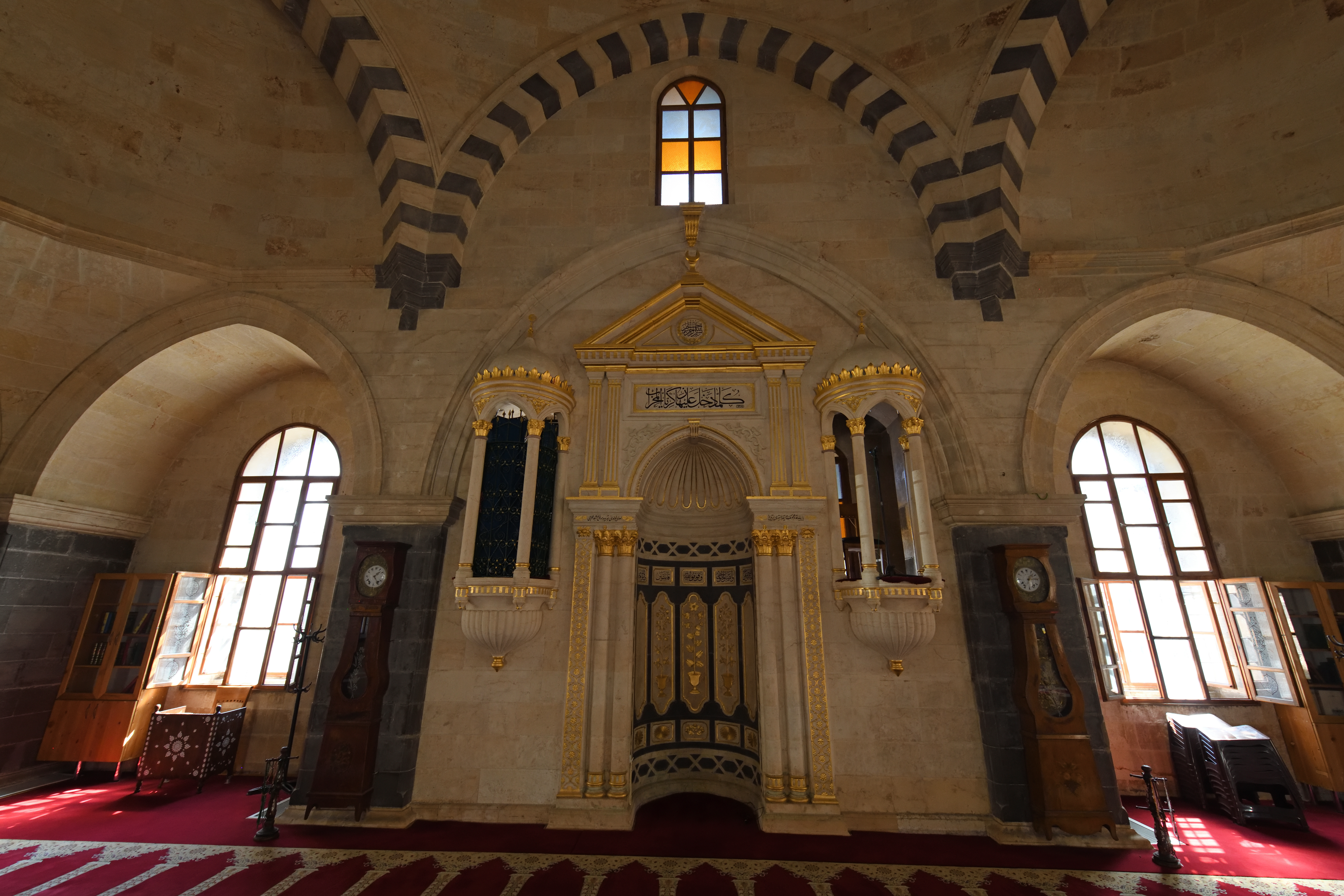
The mihrab

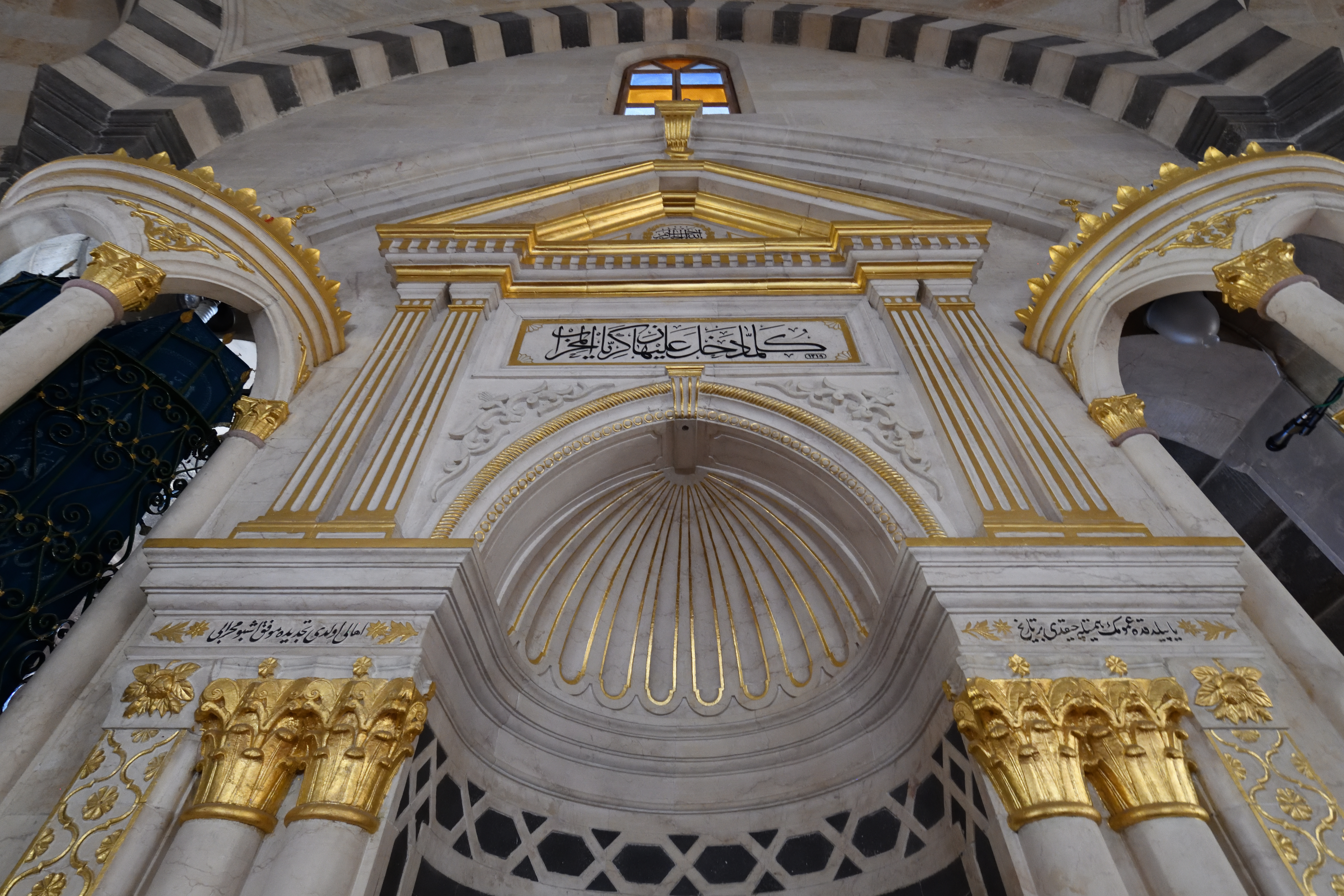
A closer view of the mihrab
