= Royal Mamluks =

Military unit in the Mamluk Sultanate

The Royal Mamluks (Arabic: al-mamalik al-sultaniyya) were a prominent unit in the army of the Mamluk Sultanate. They were purchased and owned by the sultan himself as first-generation slave soldiers and were thus only loyal to the Sultan.

== Bibliography ==
- Petry, Carl F. (2022). The Mamluk Sultanate: A History. Cambridge University Press. ISBN 978-1-108-47104-6.
