= Gülek Castle =

Castle in the Mersin province, Turkey

- Gülek, Tarsus, Mersin Province, Turkey
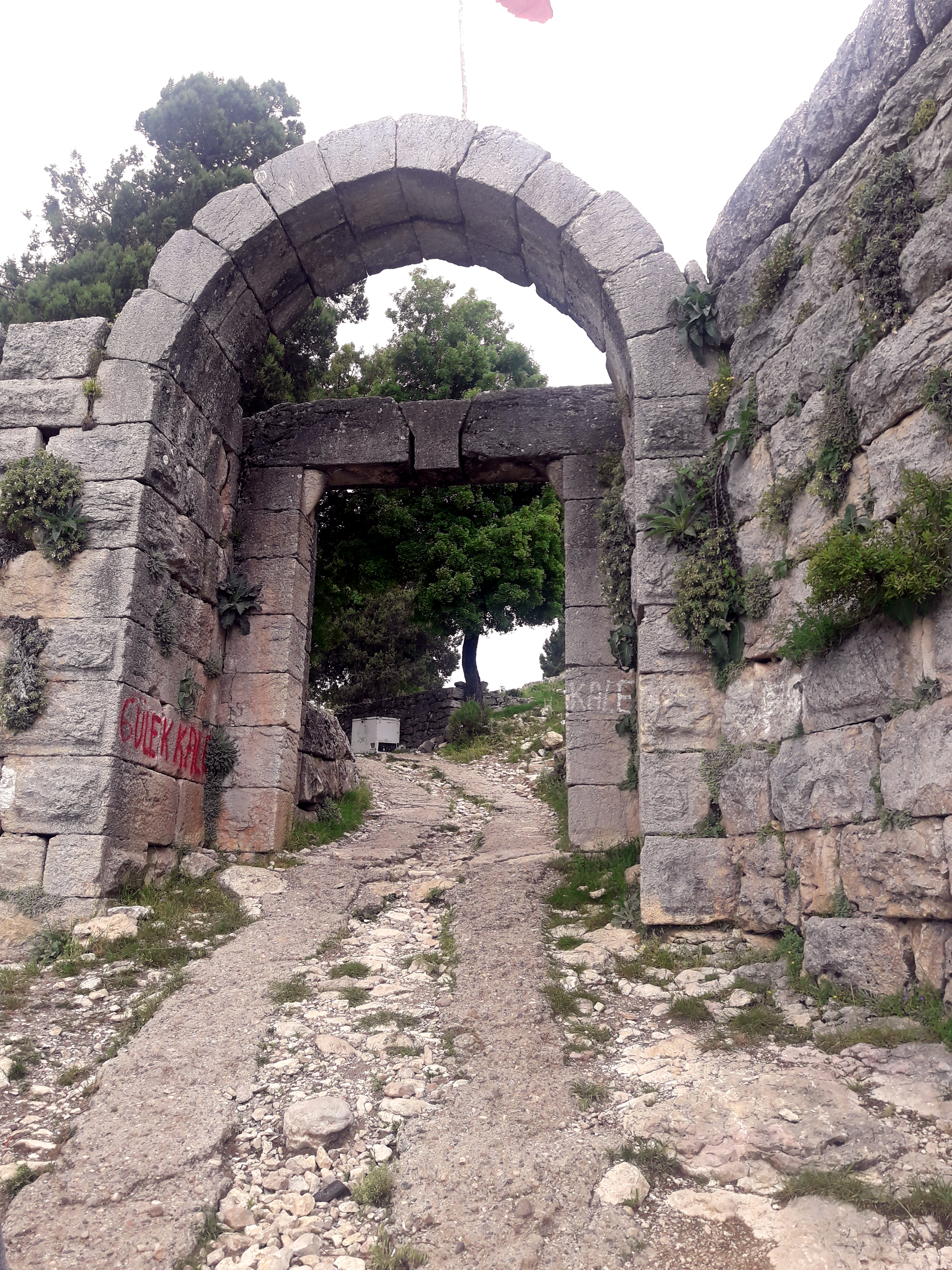
- Main gate

Site information
- Type: Castle
- Controlled by: Ministry of Culture
- Open to the public: Yes
- Condition: Only part of the wall

Location
- Coordinates: 37°16′12″N 34°47′29″E

Site history
- Built by: Armenian Kingdom of Cilicia, İbrahim Pasha of Egypt
- Demolished: Most of it

Gülek Castle is a medieval castle in Mersin Province, Turkey.

== Location ==
The castle is in the rural area of Tarsus ilçe (district) of Mersin Province. It is located to the west of Gülek Pass (Cilician Gates) at 37°16′12″N 34°47′29″E. Its altitude with respect to sea level is 1,530 metres (5,020 ft). Its distance to Tarsus is about 63 kilometres (39 mi), and to Mersin is 95 metres (312 ft).

== History ==
Gülek Kalesi (Armenian: Kuklak; Arabic: Kawlāk) is a large fortification of considerable antiquity which retains evidence of Byzantine and Arab periods of occupation, but is primarily a construction of the 12th and 13th centuries attached to the Armenian Kingdom of Cilicia. Its circuit walls and towers at the south and west cover a distance of over 450 meters. An extensive photographic survey and plan of Gülek Castle was made between 1973 and 1979. Its name in the 12th century was Askaliba. In an Armenian document a certain Symbat was named as the lord of the castle. The castle was used to control the passage from Cilicia to Cappadocia and the passengers had to pay a certain sum to the lord of the castle. Later, the castle was captured by the Mamluks of Egypt and the Ottoman Empire. Ottomans obtained lead from the mines to the northwest of the castle. During the revolt of Mehmet Ali Pasha in the 19th century, the castle was used by İbrahim Pasha of Egypt, Mehmet Ali's son.

== Description ==
The gate is at the south side. The castle walls are on the south and west side. The north and the east sides are protected by the natural sharp clifts. Most of the building material is bossage type stones, typical of Armenian masonry. But there are also more recent ruins which resemble that of the Casemates of İbrahim Pasha (which are situated to the north of Gülek Castle).

== Gallery ==
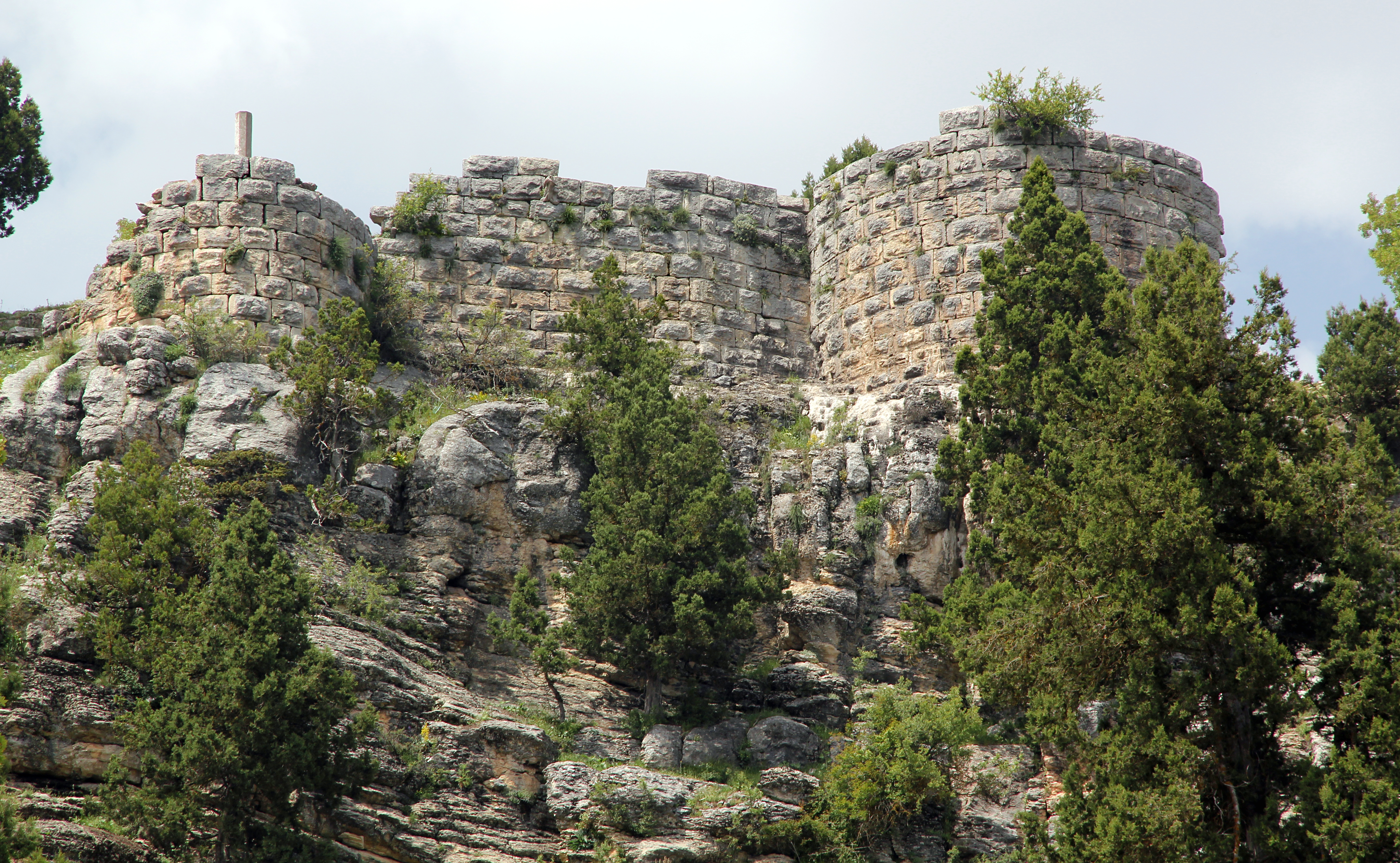
Detail from the walls

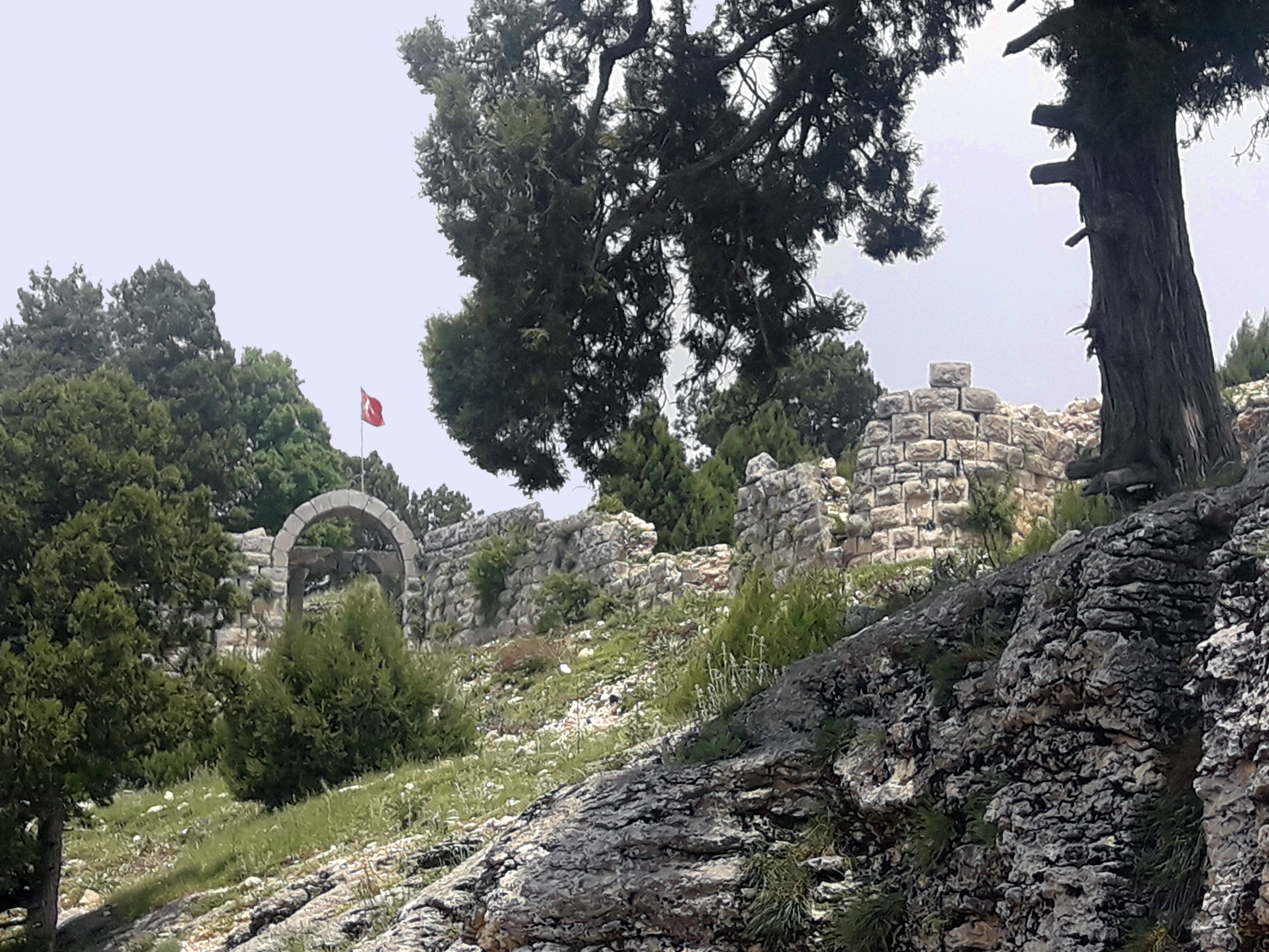
Walls from west

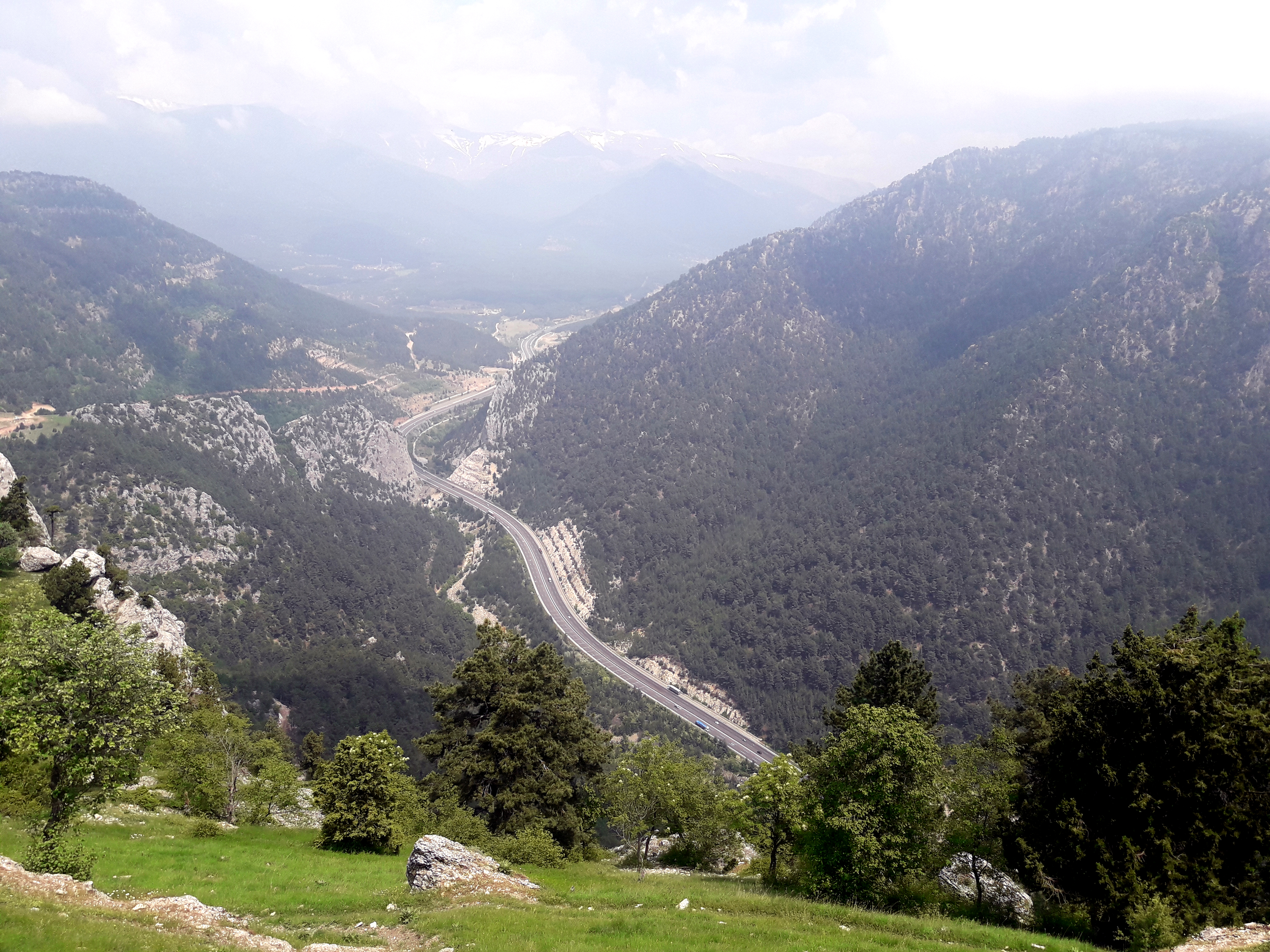
Cilician Gates from the castle
