= Şirvani Mosque =

Mosque in Gaziantep, Turkey

- Şirvani Camii
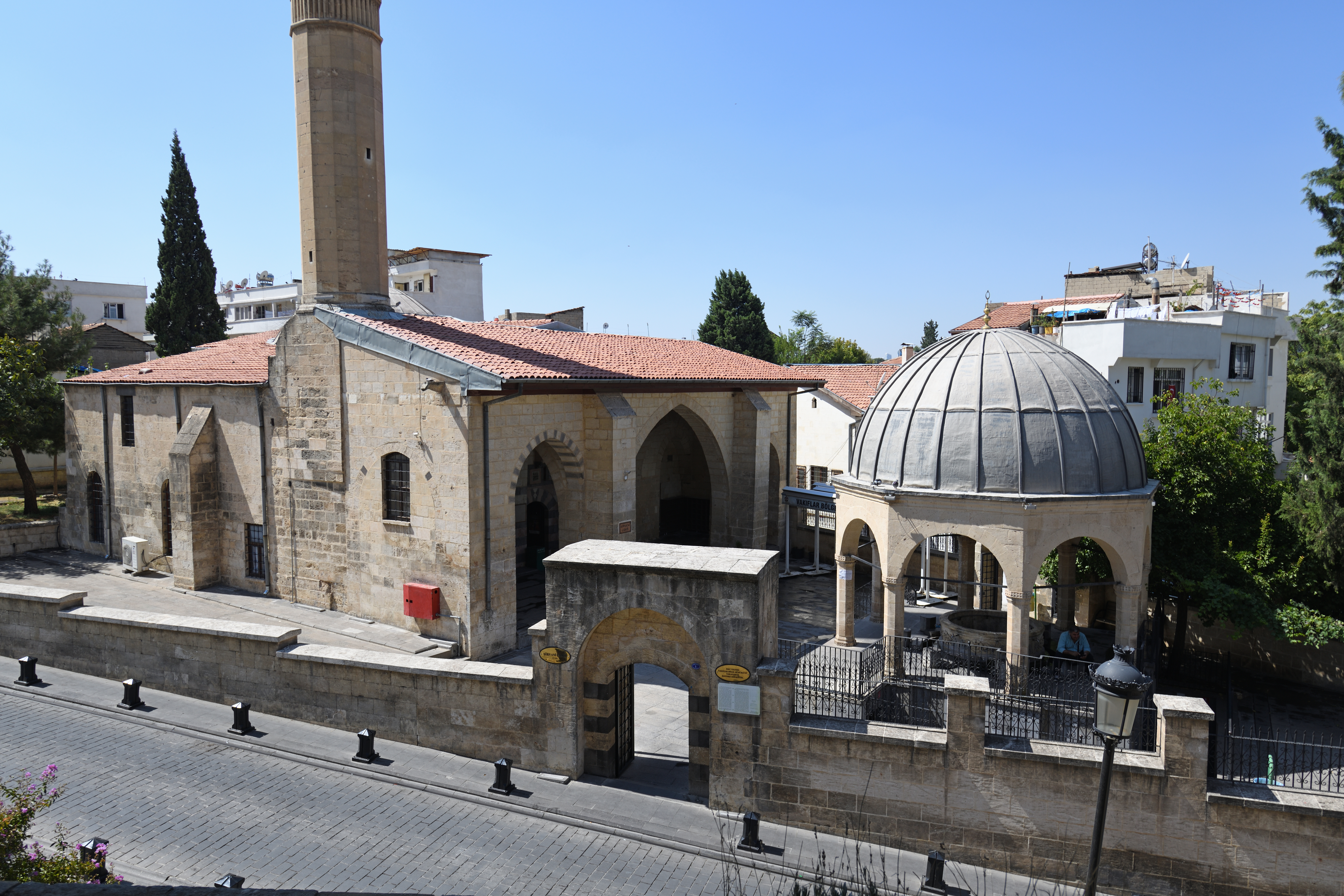

- Location within Turkey

Religion
- Affiliation: Islam

Location
- Municipality: Gaziantep
- Country: Turkey
- Interactive map of Şirvani Mosque
- Coordinates: 37°03′57″N 37°22′54″E

Architecture
- Type: mosque
- Minaret: 1 (collapsed in 2023 earthquake)

Şirvani Camii, Şirvani Mehmet Efendi Camii or İki Şerefeli Camii is a mosque in Gaziantep, Turkey.

It is located in the Seferpaşa neighborhood, southwest of Gaziantep Castle. The mosque, which is one of the oldest in the city, was commissioned by Şirvani Mehmet Efendi.

Video showing damage to the mosque (from 0:53) and the nearby Gaziantep Castle on the day of the 2023 earthquake

Another name for the mosque is the İki Şerefeli Camii (Double Balcony Mosque) because, unlike conventional mosques which have only one, its minaret has two balconies. Also distinctively, the minbar is located in a special slot and is moved out for special services.

On 6 February 2023, the mosque was seriously damaged by two consecutive earthquakes.
