= Gaziantep Castle =

Castle in Turkey

- Gaziantep Kalesi (Turkish)
- Antep Castle
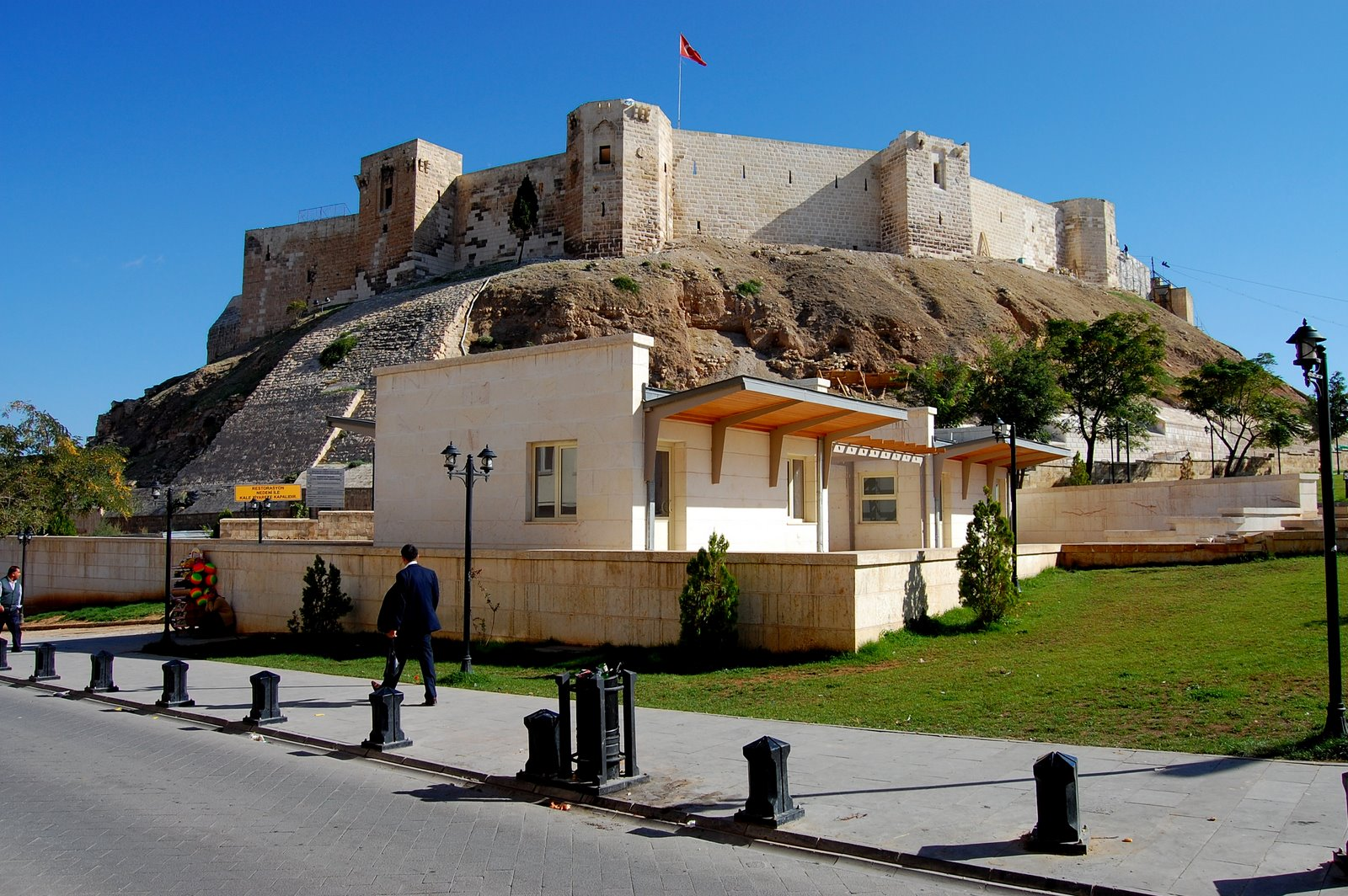
- Gaziantep Castle in 2008

- Location within Turkey
- Interactive map of Gaziantep Castle
- 37.0664°N 37.3833°E
- Type: Fortification
- Location: Gaziantep, Turkey

History
- Built: 2nd and 3rd century
- Built for: Roman Empire
- Original use: Observation post

Site notes
- Current use: Gaziantep Defence and Heroism Panoramic Museum

Gaziantep Castle (Turkish: Gaziantep Kalesi) is a castle on top of a mound in the centre of Gaziantep, Turkey. First used as an observation point during the Hittite Empire, it was expanded into a castle during Roman rule. The castle was severely damaged by earthquakes in February 2023.

== History ==
The hilltop was first used as an observation point by the Hittite Empire. It was later expanded into a main castle by the Roman Empire in the 2nd and 3rd centuries AD. It underwent further expansion and renovation under Byzantine Emperor Justinian I between AD 527 and 565. The circumference of the round shaped castle is 1,200 metres (3,900 ft). The walls are built of stone and the castle has 12 bastions.

The castle has been renovated numerous times. It saw changes made during the reign of the Ayyubids in the 12th and 13th centuries, as well as the Ottoman Empire, and played an important role during the Turkish War of Independence of the early 20th century.

It is used as the Gaziantep Defence and Heroism Panoramic Museum, and a documentary regarding the defence of the city against the French forces after the fall of the Ottoman Empire runs periodically.

On 6 February 2023, the castle was severely damaged by two consecutive earthquakes. Some of the eastern and southern bastions collapsed, and iron railings and walls around the castle were seriously damaged. Restoration work began in September 2023 with the support of the Ministry of Culture and Tourism, and it is estimated that the castle will open its doors to tourists at the end of 2024.

== Gallery ==
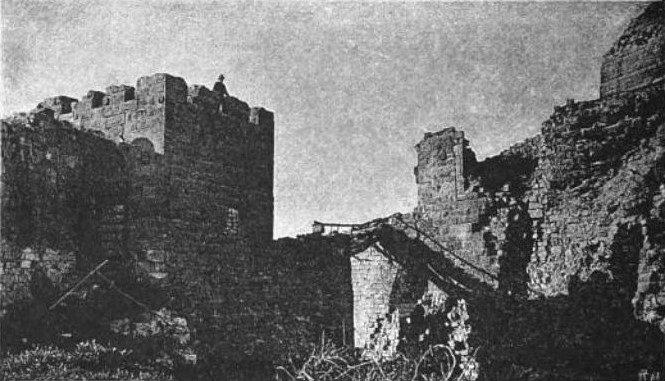
The bridge of Gaziantep Castle, 19th century

Video showing damage to the castle and the nearby Şirvani Mosque on the day of the 2023 earthquake
