= Sanjak of Çirmen =

Sanjak of the Ottoman Empire

Sanjak of Çirmen Ottoman Turkish: Liva-i Çirmen
- Sanjak of the Ottoman Empire
- ca. 1371–1829
- Capital: Initially Çirmen (Ormenio), later Edirne
- History
  - Ottoman conquest: ca. 1371
  - Move of capital to Edirne: 1829
Preceded by	Succeeded by
Byzantine Empire	Sanjak of Edirne
- Today part of: Bulgaria; Greece; Turkey

The Sanjak of Çirmen or Chirmen (Ottoman Turkish: Çirmen Sancağı/Liva-i Çirmen) was a second-level Ottoman province (sanjak or liva) encompassing the region of Çirmen (mod. Ormenio in Thrace. It was succeeded in 1829 by the Sanjak of Edirne.

== History ==
The town of Çirmen (Greek: Ὀρμένιον - Ormenion) was conquered from the Byzantine Empire by the Ottoman Turks in 1371. With some interruptions, it was thereafter the centre of a distinct province (sanjak), first of the Rumelia Eyalet, and after the early 17th century of the Özü Eyalet. The province extended over most of the Rhodope mountains, the middle course of the Maritsa and the upper course of the Tundzha, at times including the city Edirne (Adrianople), which, as a former imperial capital (until 1453) at other times was administered as an independent crown domain. After the disbandment of Özü Eyalet in 1812, Çirmen belonged to Edirne Eyalet, and in 1829, its capital was moved to Edirne.

== Sources ==
- Birken, Andreas [in German] (1976). Die Provinzen des Osmanischen Reiches [The Provinces of the Ottoman Empire]. Beihefte zum Tübinger Atlas des Vorderen Orients, 13 (in German). Reichert. ISBN 3-920153-56-1.
