= Siege of Kayseri (1490) =

- Part of the Ottoman–Mamluk War (1485–1491)
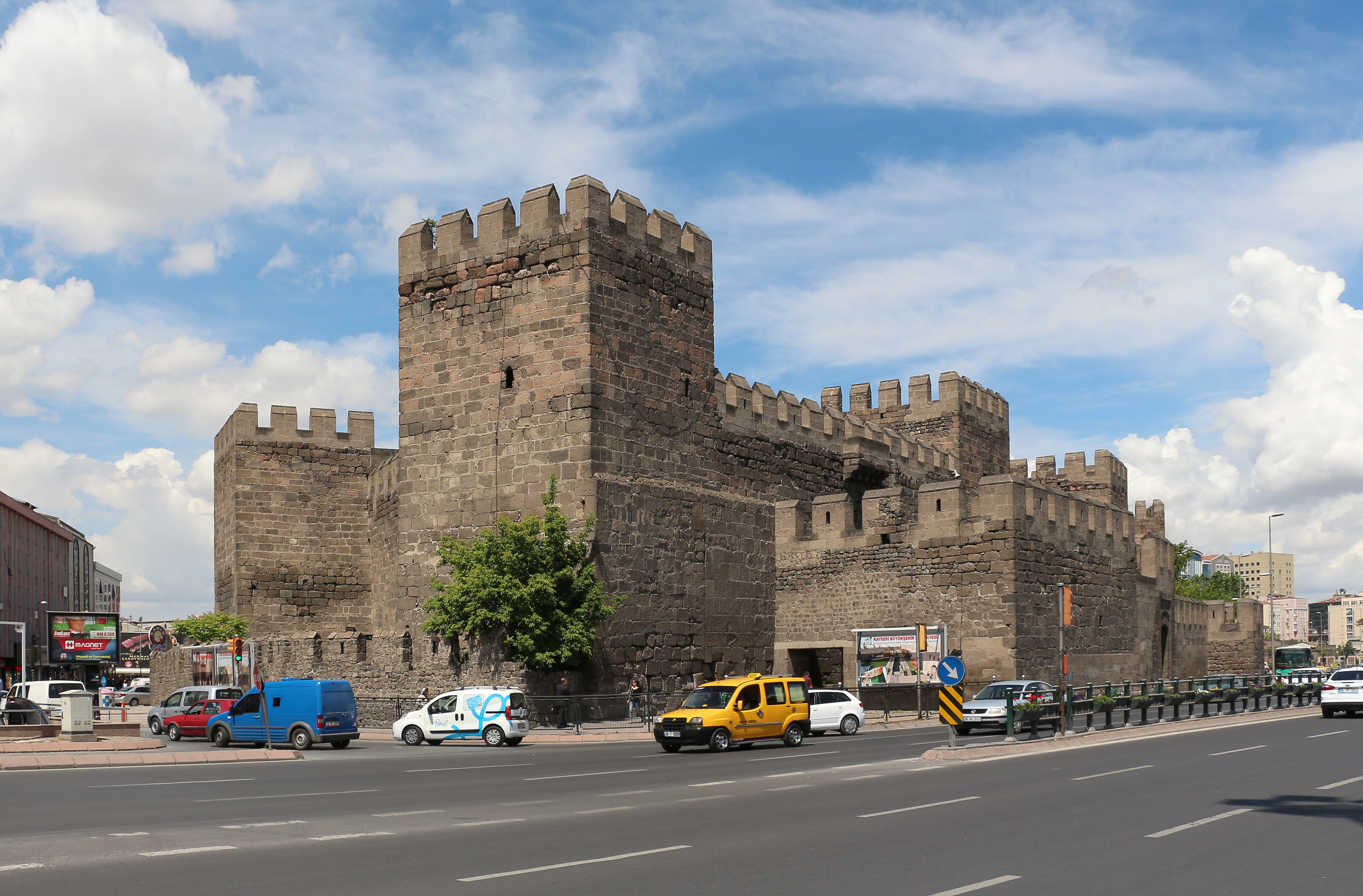
- Kayseri Castle today
Date	January – February 1490
Location	Kayseri, Karaman Eyalet, Ottoman Empire
Result	Mamluk victory
Territorial changes	Parts of Karaman Eyalet captured by Mamluks: Mamluks eventually withdraw and sign peace

Belligerents
Ottoman Empire	Mamluk Sultanate

Commanders and leaders
Mihailoğlu İskender Bey (POW); Hersekzade Ahmed Pasha (POW); Mustafa Pasha †	Uzbek Bey; Al-Ashraf Qansuh al-Ghawri

Strength
Relief Army: 30,000–60,000; Garrison: Unknown	22,000–62,000

Casualties and losses
Heavy, garrison surrendered	Heavy

The 1490 siege of Kayseri took place during the Ottoman–Mamluk War (1485–1491). Mamluk forces, led by Atabeg Uzbek Bey and Al-Ashraf Qansuh al-Ghuri, laid siege to the central Anatolian city of Kayseri, which was under Ottoman control. The siege resulted in a Mamluk victory after the Ottoman forces, led by Governor Mihailoğlu İskender Bey, were decisively defeated and the city fell.

== Background ==
In 1488, Ottoman and Mamluk armies met near Aga Çayırı. After a bloody battle the Mamluks defeated the Ottomans, killing half of their army. The Mamluks attempted to pursue the commander of the battle, Hadım Ali Pasha, but he managed to escape.

== Siege ==
One month later, in January 1490, Uzbek Bey and Al-Ashraf Qansuh al-Ghawri led an army mainly made up of survivors of the previous battle at Aga Çayırı and invaded Karaman Eyalet, capturing Karaman and laying siege to Kayseri. Mihailoğlu İskender Bey, the governor of Kayseri at the time, managed to hold out until February when Bayezid II sent an army of 30,000–60,000 men under Hersekzade Ahmed Pasha. However, while trying to break the siege, Ahmed Pasha was captured by the Mamluks for the second time. The Ottoman army suffered heavy casualties, and Mustafa Pasha, the son of İskender Pasha, was killed. After this, İskender Pasha decided to surrender to the Mamluks, and the siege ended with a Mamluk victory.

== Aftermath ==
After this last defeat, Bayezid II thought of launching an imperial campaign, which greatly worried Sultan Qaitbay. This led him to agree to peace. However, the Mamluk Sultan could not bring himself to request peace directly, fearing the Ottomans’ excessive demands. Instead, he brought in the ruler of another Muslim country, Abu Yahya Zakariya III, and the two countries agreed to return to the situation at the beginning of the war. Both the Ottoman and Mamluk forces returned the lands they had taken, thus concluding the conflict with the signing of peace in 1491.

== See also ==
- Ottoman–Mamluk War (1485–1491)
