= 1485 =

1485 in various calendars
- Gregorian calendar: 1485; MCDLXXXV
- Ab urbe condita: 2238
- Armenian calendar: 934; ԹՎ ՋԼԴ
- Assyrian calendar: 6235
- Balinese saka calendar: 1406–1407
- Bengali calendar: 891–892
- Berber calendar: 2435
- English Regnal year: 2 Ric. 3 – 1 Hen. 7
- Buddhist calendar: 2029
- Burmese calendar: 847
- Byzantine calendar: 6993–6994
- Chinese calendar: 甲辰年 (Wood Dragon); 4182 or 3975 — to — 乙巳年 (Wood Snake); 4183 or 3976
- Coptic calendar: 1201–1202
- Discordian calendar: 2651
- Ethiopian calendar: 1477–1478
- Hebrew calendar: 5245–5246
- Hindu calendars
- Vikram Samvat: 1541–1542
- Shaka Samvat: 1406–1407
- Kali Yuga: 4585–4586
- Holocene calendar: 11485
- Igbo calendar: 485–486
- Iranian calendar: 863–864
- Islamic calendar: 889–890
- Japanese calendar: Bunmei 17 (文明１７年)
- Javanese calendar: 1401–1402
- Julian calendar: 1485; MCDLXXXV
- Korean calendar: 3818
- Minguo calendar: 427 before ROC 民前427年
- Nanakshahi calendar: 17
- Thai solar calendar: 2027–2028
- Tibetan calendar: ཤིང་ཕོ་འབྲུག་ལོ་ (male Wood-Dragon); 1611 or 1230 or 458 — to — ཤིང་མོ་སྦྲུལ་ལོ་ (female Wood-Snake); 1612 or 1231 or 459

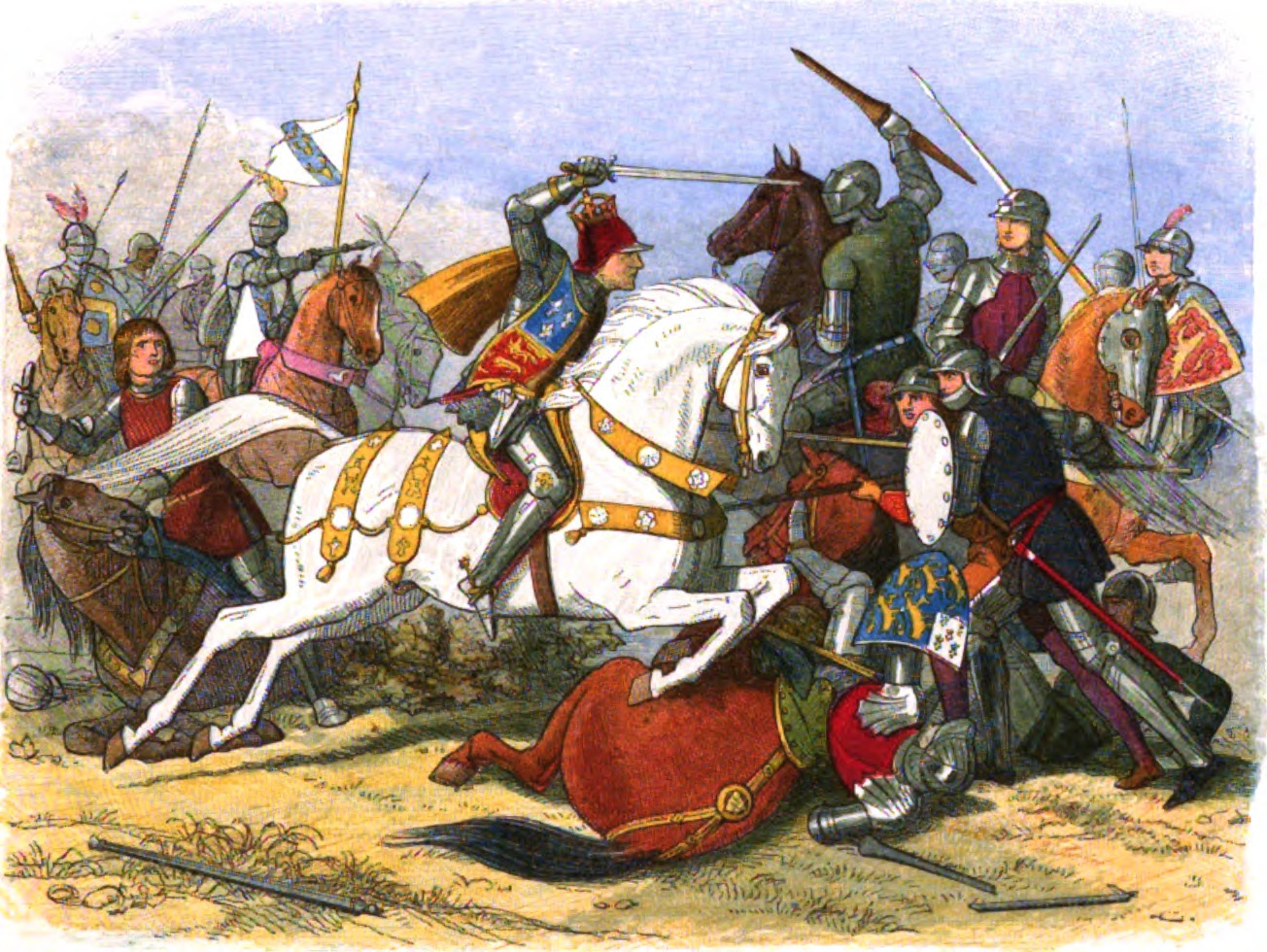
Richard III of England is killed at the Battle of Bosworth Field.

Year 1485 (MCDLXXXV) was a common year starting on Saturday of the Julian calendar.

== Events ==
=== January–March ===
- January 6 – Saint Leopold of Babenburg, who died almost 350 years earlier in 1136, is canonized as a Roman Catholic saint by Pope Innocent VIII. Saint Leopold will be celebrated as the patron saint of Austria in the centuries that follow.
- January 29 – The siege of Vienna, capital of the Holy Roman Empire, is started by the Black Army of the Kingdom of Hungary in the ninth year of the ongoing Austrian-Hungarian War. Vienna is defended by a force of only 3,000 soldiers and cavalry, against 28,000 soldiers and cavalry of the Black Army, and the city falls to Hungary within four months.
- February 3 – Three days after returning to Germany following his pilgrimage to the Holy Land, John V, Count of Nassau-Siegen founds the Franciscan monastery at his capital in Siegen.
- February 9 – The Adana campaign begins when the Egyptian Mamluk Sultanate, begins a siege to recover the city of Adana (now in Turkey), recently captured by the Ottoman Empire. General Uzbek min Tutuh, Governor of Damascus, leads the Egyptian troops, marking the beginning of the first Ottoman–Mamluk war.
- March 16 – A solar eclipse crosses northern South America and Central Europe. (March 8 O.S.) Although King Richard III's wife, the Queen Consort, dies on March 16, 1485 as well, the Julian calendar date is eight days sooner than the Gregorian calendar date of March 24.

=== April–June ===
- April 16 – Vuk Grgurevic Brancovic, the Despot of Serbia under Hungarian rule, dies after a reign of 14 years, bringing the Brankovic dynasty to an end, leaving the office vacant and prompting Hungary's King Matthias Corvinus to find a suitable heir.
- April 27 – King Charles VIII of France convenes a lit de justice, a special session of the Parlement de Paris at Rouen, confirms the Charter to the Normans, the French acknowledgment of the autonomy of the Duchy of Normandy within the Kingdom of France.
- May 22 – In Spain, the Christian Crown of Castile seizes the city of Ronda from the Islamic Emirate of Granada.
- May 26 – King James III of Scotland gives royal assent to numerous acts passed by the Scottish Parliament, including the England Act (regarding the peace between "betuix our soverane lord and Richard king of Ingland", and "the marriage and alliance appointed to be made and performed.")
- June 1 – King Matthias Corvinus of Hungary secures the surrender of Vienna, the Holy Roman Empire's capital, after a siege of four months. Frederick III, Holy Roman Emperor, had departed the city before the siege began.
- June 22 – King Richard III of England, alerted to news that Henry Tudor, Earl of Richmond, is planning to invade England, orders his lords to be fully alert.

=== July–September ===
- August 1– Accompanied by his own troops and French mercenaries, Henry Tudor sets sail from Honfleur in France with 30 ships to begin his second attempt to invade the Kingdom of England.
- August 5– The first outbreak of sweating sickness in England begins.
- August 7– After departing France and sailing around the south coast of the island of Britain, Henry Tudor and his troops enter Mill Bay and land near Dale, Pembrokeshire Wales without opposition, and begin marching toward London to attack King Richard, camping at Haverfordwest. From there, the Tudor supporters march north to Cardigan; Llwyn Dafydd; Llanilar, Aberystwyth; Machynlleth, then turn eastward at Mathafarn on August 14.
- August 11– News of Henry's landing at Wales reaches Richard, who issues a mobilization order that his lords received on August 14.
- August 15– Henry Tudor's army begins crossing the border from Wales into England at Mathafarn, then marches towards London.
- August 22 – At the Battle of Bosworth Field, King Richard III of England is killed in battle by the soldiers of Rhys ap Thomas and Sir William Stanley, in the service of Henry Tudor, Earl of Richmond. With the death of King Richard, the Yorkist troops retreat. King Richard's remains will lie undiscovered for 517 years until 2012 when they are found during the excavation of a parking lot in Leicester.
- September 8 – The army of the Grand Duchy of Moscow forces, led by Ivan III, invades the city of Tver, ruled by Mikhail III and capital of the Duchy of Tver. Within 10 days, Ivan is able to claim the Duchy.
- September 15 –
  - Peter Arbues is assaulted while praying in the cathedral at Zaragoza in the Kingdom of Aragon, now part of Spain; he dies on September 17. He had been appointed Inquisitor of Aragon by the Inquisitor General, Tomás de Torquemada, in the campaign against heresy and Spanish Judaism.
  - Less than four weeks after the Battle of Bosworth and the defeat of Richard III, King Henry VII summons the English Parliament, directing the members of the House of Lords and the House of Commons to assemble at Westminster for the November 7 opening of the English Parliament.

=== October–December ===
- October 12 – Thomas Lovell is appointed for life as England's Chancellor of the Exchequer by King Henry. He will serve for 39 years before his death in 1524.
- October 30 – The coronation of King Henry VII as King of England is held.
- November 2 – The Peace of Bourges temporarily stops the civil war in France, dubbed "the Mad War". (la Guerre folle)
- November 7 – The first session of the English Parliament under King Henry VII is opened, with Lovell elected as the Speaker of the House of Commons.
- December 10 – Members of the House of Commons ask King Henry VII to marry Elizabeth of York.

=== Date unknown ===
- Leon Battista Alberti's De Re Aedificatoria (written 1443–1452 and published posthumously) becomes the first printed work on architecture.
- From about this date, Leonardo da Vinci produces a number of designs for flying machines, including the aerial screw or helicopter (probably unworkable).

== Births ==
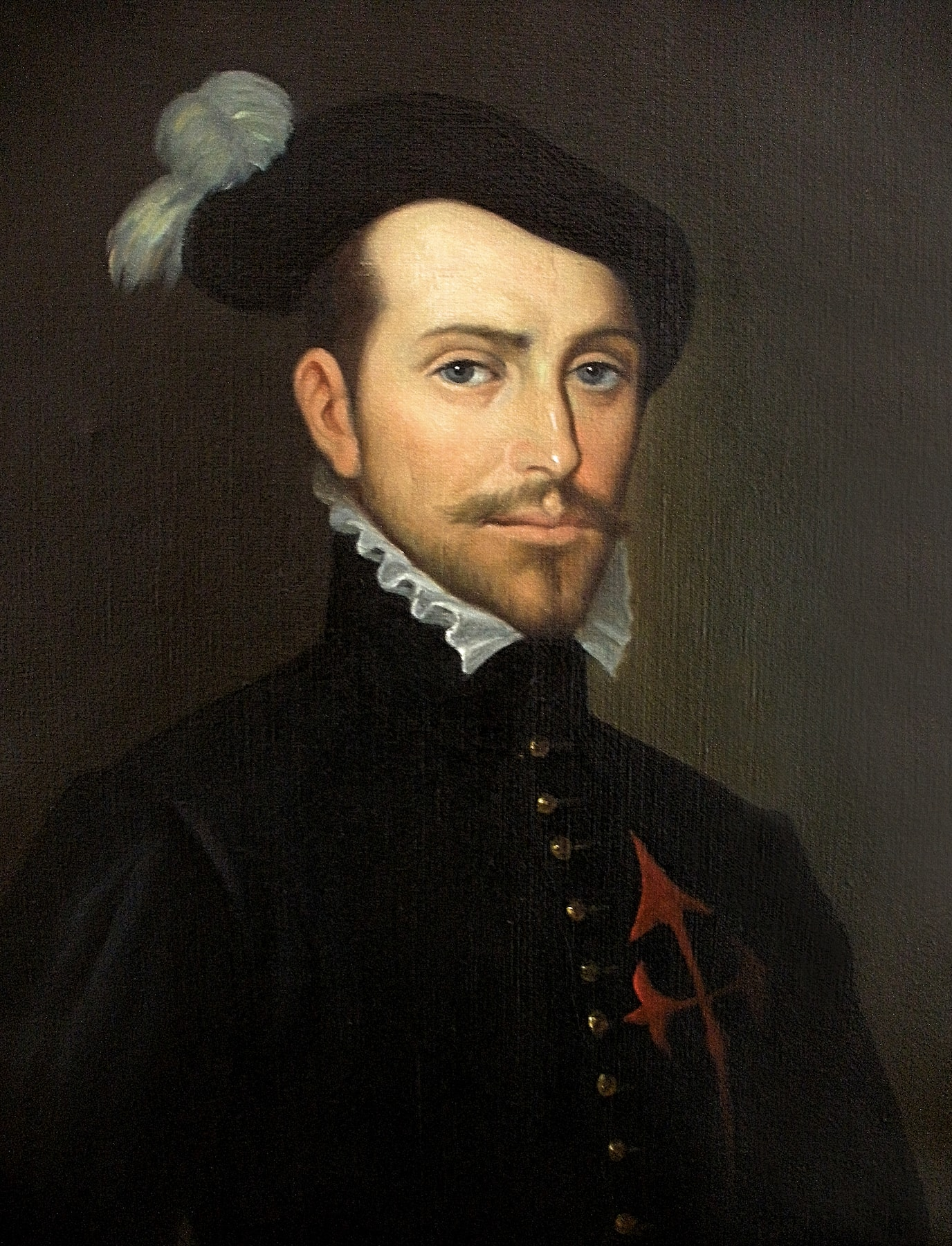
Hernán Cortés

- March 10 – Sophie of Brandenburg-Ansbach-Kulmbach, German princess (d. 1537)
- April 26 – Sibylle of Baden, Countess consort of Hanau-Lichtenberg (d. 1518)
- June 20 – Astorre III Manfredi, Italian noble (d. 1502)
- June 24
  - Johannes Bugenhagen, German religious reformer (d. 1558)
  - Elizabeth of Denmark, Electress of Brandenburg (1502–1535) (d. 1555)
- July 20 – Giovanni Battista Ramusio, Italian geographer (d. 1557)
- August 22 – Beatus Rhenanus, German humanist and religious reformer (d. 1547)
- September 14 – Anna of Mecklenburg-Schwerin, Mecklenburgian royal (d. 1525)
- October 1 – Johannes Dantiscus, Polish poet and bishop (d. 1548)
- October 8 – Antonio Pucci, Italian Catholic cardinal (d. 1544)
- November 30 – Veronica Gambara, Italian poet and stateswoman (d. 1550)
- December 16 – Catherine of Aragon, first queen of Henry VIII of England, and daughter of Ferdinand II of Aragon and Isabella I of Castile (d. 1536)
- date unknown
  - Hernán Cortés, Spanish conquistador (d. 1547)
  - Odet de Foix, Vicomte de Lautrec, French military leader (d. 1528)
  - Johanna of Hachberg-Sausenberg, ruler of Neuchatel (d. 1543)
  - Giovanni da Verrazzano, Italian explorer (approximate date; d. c. 1528)
- probable
  - Hugh Aston, English composer (d. 1558)
  - Thomas Cromwell, 1st Earl of Essex, English statesman (d. 1540)
  - Clément Janequin, French chanson composer
  - Sayyida al Hurra, Moroccan pirate queen
  - Sebastiano del Piombo, Italian painter (d. 1547)
  - John Russell, 1st Earl of Bedford, English royal minister (d. 1555)

== Deaths ==
- January 20 – Eustochia Smeralda Calafato, Italian saint (b. 1434)
- February 28 – Niclas, Graf von Abensberg, German soldier (b. 1441)
- March 16 – Anne Neville, queen of Richard III of England (b. 1456)
- August 7 – Alexander Stewart, Duke of Albany, Scottish prince (b. c. 1454)
- August 15 – Albert II, Duke of Brunswick-Grubenhagen (b. 1419)
- August 22 (killed in the Battle of Bosworth Field):
  - King Richard III of England (b. 1452)
  - John Howard, 1st Duke of Norfolk (b. 1430)
  - James Harrington, Yorkist knight
  - Richard Ratcliffe, supporter of Richard III
  - John Babington, High Sheriff of Nottinghamshire, Derbyshire and the Royal Forests
  - Robert Brackenbury, English nobleman, courtier and supporter of Richard III
  - Walter Devereux, 8th Baron Ferrers of Chartley, supporter of Richard III
  - William Brandon, supporter of Henry VII (b. 1456)
- August 25 – William Catesby, supporter of Richard III (executed) (b. 1450)
- October 17 – John Scott of Scott's Hall, Warden of the Cinque Ports
- October 27 – Rodolphus Agricola, Dutch scholar (b. 1443)
- November 4 – Françoise d'Amboise, Duchess of Brittany (b. 1427)
- November 4 – Giovanni Mocenigo, Doge of Venice (b. 1408)
- Date unknown – Kristina Königsmarck, Swedish noblewoman.
