= Battle of Aga-Cayiri =

1488 battle

- Part of the First Ottoman–Mamluk War
Date	1488
Location	Cilicia
Result	Mamluk victory

Belligerents
Ottoman Empire	Mamluk Sultanate

Commanders and leaders
Hadim Ali Pasha (WIA); Turahanoğlu Ömer Bey; Kızıl Ahmed Bey; Yularkıstı Sinan Bey (POW); Ishak Pasha (POW); Karagöz Mehmed Pasha (executed)	Uzbek Bey; Emir Temruz al-Shamsi; Emir Uzdamur; Khalil ibn Ismail; Shayh Jabal Nabulus; Barsbay Kara †; Amir Sibay min Kanibay al-Tuyūrī al-Zahiri †

Strength
60,000–120,000 men 80–100 ships	40,000–70,000

Casualties and losses
30,000–60,000+ men 66 ships: 25 lost; 41 captured	8,000 men

Battle of Ağaçayırı was a battle between the army of the Ottoman Empire under the command of Hadım Ali Pasha and the army of the Mamluk Sultanate led by Emir Uzbek. The battle began on August 16, 1488, between Tarsus and Adana during the First Ottoman–Mamluk War, and ended the next day in favor of the Egyptians. In 1488, the Mamluk army on the way to Adana was caught in a trap at the exit of the Belen Pass near Iskenderun. The Ottoman fleet, commanded by Hersekli Ahmed Pasha, was on standby and fired upon the vanguard of the Mamluk army. However, the fleet was later caught in a storm, which allowed the Mamluk army to pass into the Çukurova lowlands.

At this time, the Ottoman army was busy restoring the destroyed fortifications of the cities. Camping near Ağaçayırı, roughly halfway between Adana and Tarsus, the Mamluk army rested for two or three days until the Ottoman army approached. The Mamluk army attacked the Ottoman army the same day to prevent their soldiers from resting. Initially, the advantage was with the Ottomans, but the death of several commanders on their right flank led to confusion and retreat. At night, Ali Pasha withdrew to Ereğli. This was the third major Ottoman defeat in the Ottoman–Mamluk War, resulting in the temporary loss of part of Cilicia by the Ottomans.

== Background ==
The war between the Ottoman Empire and the Mamluk Sultanate began in 1485. Twice—in 1485 and 1486—the Ottomans suffered heavy defeats. In 1486, at the Battle of Adana, the beylerbey of Karaman, Karagöz Mehmet Pasha, fled the battlefield with his army, resulting in the Ottoman commander and son-in-law of Sultan Bayezid II, Hersekli Ahmed Pasha, being wounded and captured. In 1487, after a successful campaign by the grand vizier Koca Davud Pasha in Cilicia, Hersekli Ahmed was released by the Mamluks. Following this, Bayezid appointed Ahmed Pasha as the Sanjak-bey of Gallipoli. This position meant that Ahmed Pasha became the commander of the Ottoman fleet.

In early December 1487, a divan was convened in Istanbul, where Bayezid decided to continue military operations. According to Idris Bidlisi, the goal was to establish control over Cilicia. The army was placed under the command of the recently appointed vizier Hadım Ali Pasha. The beylerbeys of Rumelia, Anatolia, and Karaman—Halil Pasha, Sinan Pasha, and Yakub Pasha, respectively—were to bring their armies under his command. Additionally, the Ottoman fleet under Hersekli Ahmed Pasha was to participate in the campaign. On 17 March 1488 (a few sources mention the 18th), the Ottoman army crossed the Bosporus. Ali Pasha led the army past Konya to Ereğli, Konya.

Passing through the Cilician Gates and quickly capturing the castles of Cilicia, Ali Pasha appointed commanders in each captured settlement. He then ordered the reconstruction of the bridge in Adana and the repair of the fortifications of Adana and Tarsus, which had been damaged in previous sieges. The Divan secretary (Nişancı) Tajizade Saadi Çelebi called Ali Pasha "the sword of the Almighty" after these events.

The Ottoman fleet began gathering near the island of Skyros in early 1488. Receiving reports from the governors of their island possessions in the Aegean Sea, the Venetians became alarmed and dispatched Admiral Francisco di Priuli with a fleet of thirty to forty ships to monitor the Ottomans. Priuli arrived at Cyprus two days before the Ottoman fleet passed by the island, preventing it from landing in Famagusta. The Ottoman fleet passed by Rhodes on May 28, 1488.

News of the Ottoman capture of Cilicia reached Cairo in April 1488, prompting Sultan Al-Ashraf Qaitbay to assemble an army. In mid-May 1488, the Mamluk army under Emir Ozbay moved north. In Aleppo, Ozbay received reports of the latest news from scouts returning from Cilicia.

== Forces Involved ==
Francesco Sansovino estimated the Ottoman forces at 120,000 men, Richard Knolles and the secretary of the Knights Hospitaller Guillaume Caoursin estimated 100,000, while Giovanni Maria Angiolello estimated 60,000. Historians consider Angiolello's estimate more reliable. The army included three thousand kapikulu cavalry, six thousand infantry janissaries, and akıncı under the command of Turahanoğlu Ömer Bey.

The Mamluk army was smaller, although Muhammad ibn Iyas, who lived in Cairo, wrote that since the time of Sultan Barquq (1382-1399), Egypt had not gathered such a large army. According to him, "this was one of the largest armies ever heard of." The army arrived in Damascus between May 22 and July 4 and moved toward Aleppo. Estimates of the Mamluk army's size vary.

The Damascene Muhammad Ibn Ali Ibn Tulun and G. Caoursin wrote of 50,000 men, M. Guadzo, F. Sansovino and R. Nolls of 70,000, but the most realistic estimate is 40,000, given by Angiolello.

Grand Master of the Knights Hospitaller Pierre d'Aubusson, who observed the passage of the Ottoman fleet past Rhodes, wrote in a letter to the Pope Innocent VIII about 80 Ottoman ships. Angiolello mentioned the same figure. S. Fisher considered this estimate accurate. Marino Sanudo the Younger, Ashikpashazade and Kemalpashazade wrote about one hundred ships. This view is shared by M. Cezar.

== First Clash ==
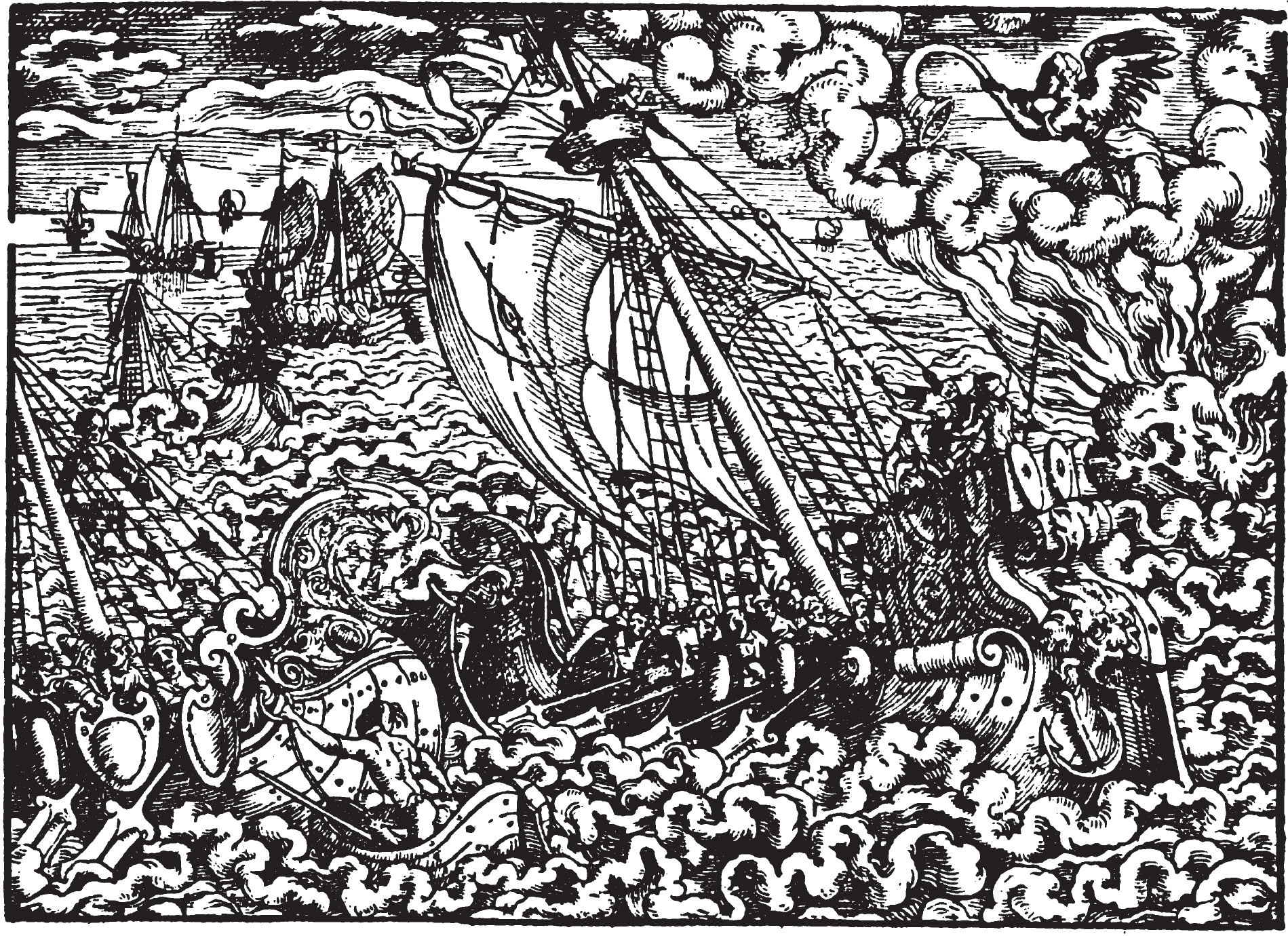
“On the same day, ten ships, which Ahmed Pasha, the son-in-law of the Lord and admiral, sent from the rest of the fleet to the coast of Syria, were caught by a fierce storm and thrown onto the rocks.” G. Caoursin

The first clash between the two armies was described by the resident of Damascus, Muhammad ibn Ali ibn Tulun, and the Ottoman contemporary, Idris Bidlisi. According to Ibn Tulun, on 21 July 1488, the vanguard of the Mamluk army, consisting of Palestinian Arabs under the command of their leader Khalil ibn Ismail, and Syrian detachments fell into an Ottoman trap. The passage through the Syrian Gates was controlled by Hersekli Ahmed Pasha. Soon after the advanced units of the Syrian army passed through the gorge, they found themselves on a narrow strip of land (Bab al-Malik) between the sea and the mountains, making them an easy target. Near the mouth of the Payas River, where it flows into the İskenderun Bay, Ottoman cannons and muskets almost completely destroyed them. Among the dead was the wali of Hama, Amir Sibay min Kanibay al-Tuyūrī al-Zahiri.

The few survivors fled to Aleppo, where Uzbek (Ozbay) was with news of the Ottoman blockade of the Syrian Gates and the destruction of the vanguard units. Despite this information, Uzbek ordered to proceed according to the previously devised plan and on August 9 he himself with the Mamluk army arrived at the fortress of Bagras, the gathering place of the Cilician tribes Ramazanogullari and Turgutogullari, who had fled from the Ottoman attack. Passing through the Belen Pass, Uzbek saw that Ottoman ships were stationed where he had been informed and that Bab al-Malik was still within their firing range. Uzbek found himself trapped, and his emirs were in panic, since there was no way back, and the way forward meant moving in a narrow column over the bridge across the Payas River directly under fire.

It is unknown how this clash would have ended if not for the fortunate outbreak of a storm for the Mamluks. Some Ottoman ships were thrown ashore, some were smashed against rocks.

The Mamluks fought only with Ottoman soldiers who had made it ashore from the wrecked ships, killing them in revenge for their vanguard. Ahmed Pasha led the surviving ships to Porto Palo (possibly the harbor at the mouth of the Ceyhan River), according to Angiolello, who at that time was in Aq Qoyunlu as an envoy. According to Angiolello, the Ottomans lost twenty-five ships.

Karaca Bey, the sanjakbey of Malatya, who witnessed or participated in the events, wrote to Halid Bey, sanjakbey of Çemişgezek, that initially the Ottomans won, but then the Mamluks won and captured forty-one ships. Pierre d’Obusson wrote that this was an African storm, common in this area.

== Before the Battle ==
Having captured Bab al-Malik, on 13 or 14 August 1488, the Mamluk army moved north into the Çukurova plain along the coast of the bay toward Kevare. Leaving part of the troops to besiege the Ottoman-occupied city, Uzbek led the army further toward Adana. On the way to Adana, Kevare was taken on September 29. The Mamluks crossed the Ceyhan River near Missis, and the Seyhan River near Adana. Then Uzbek headed towards Tarsus and about halfway from Adana set up camp in a plain called Ağaçayırı (Valley of Trees).

The Mamluks stayed at this spot for three days until noon on 16 August 1488, when the Ottoman army approached from Adana. Uzbek noted that the Ottoman army was larger and better armed, and gathered the emirs to decide on further actions. Some emirs advocated an immediate attack, while others suggested attacking the next morning. Two Italians present at the council recommended starting the fight immediately to prevent the Ottomans from resting and reorganizing.

== Battle ==
Many mistakenly assume that the armies of the Ottomans and Mamluks were organized according to a three-squadron formation: center, vanguard and rear guard.

The formation of both armies followed a specific order — the "battle order of the army" (tartib al-sufüf). Accordingly, the army was divided into five parts: center, right flank, left flank, vanguard, and rear guard. Therefore, the army is sometimes called in Arabic *hamis* ("five"). The center was staffed with the best troops; the commander was located in the center. On both flanks were subordinate commanders leading provincial armies. The rear guard was responsible for supplies, weapons, draft animals, and artillery. Besides the main five parts, the army could also have light cavalry units on the left and right fronts and archer units.

=== Ottoman formation ===
In the Ottoman army, the center held three thousand kapikulu cavalrymen, divided into three regiments under the command of Turahanoglu Omer Bey, Isfendiyaroglu Kızıl Ahmed Bey, and Mustanzaroglu Mahmud Bey. An elite corps of two thousand janissaries was positioned directly in front of the center.

On the right flank were the armies of Anatolia and Karaman under the command of the beylerbey of Anatolia, Sinan Arnavut Pasha, and the beylerbey of Karaman, Yakup Pasha.

On the left flank was the Rumelia army under the beylerbey of Rumelia, Halil Pasha. Between the center and Anatolia army were the akıncı under the command of the sons of Evrenos: Iskender, Suleiman, and Isa. Between the center and Rumelia army were akıncı under the sanjakbey of Ohrid, Hussein Bey. Infantry (azaps) were placed in front of the line. The son of Gedik Ahmed Pasha, Yahya, participated in the battle.

=== Mamluk formation ===
The Mamluk army formation was similar. The commander, Emir Ozbek, was in the center. On the right flank (opposite the Rumelia army) was the Damascus army under the beylerbey of Damascus, Kansuh al-Yahhawi, and on the left flank (opposite the Anatolia and Karaman armies) was the Aleppo army under the beylerbey of Aleppo, Emir Ozdemir (Uzdamur). Next to him on the left flank were detachments of smaller provinces with their emirs.

Four thousand mamluks from the elite corps of sultan's mamluks under Emir Temruz ash-Shamsi were positioned in front of the center. Auxiliary forces were deployed near both wings: Syrian Turkmens between the center and right flank, and Ramazanogullari and Turgudogullari between the center and left flank. Infantry from Syria were placed in front.

=== First phase: battle ===
On August 16 or 17, 1488, both armies met near Adana at Aga Chairi (Agadj-Tsairi, Valley of Trees). The place of battle was described by G. Caoursin as: "It was on one of those plains stretching to the Aman Mountain, where Alexander defeated Darius". Angiolello vaguely wrote that the battle took place "in the countryside before Adana on the road to Tarsus." The battle began at noon and ended only at nightfall. Initially, the Ottomans had the advantage.

According to Idris Bidlisi, the battle was initiated by the Mamluk Arab infantry, led by Khalil ibn Ismail from Nablus and Nashir-ad-Din Muhammad ibn Khanash. Tursun Bey wrote that the Mamluks first attacked both flanks and then the Ottoman center. But the azaps repelled them, the Arabs were pushed back and fled. Then on the right flank of the Mamluk formation, the Damascus army was split in two by the Rumelia army. Seeing this, Kansuh al-Yahhawi retreated and redeployed to the left flank next to the Aleppo army. Together they pressured the right Ottoman flank composed of the Anatolia and Karaman armies and akıncı detachments. Four thousand sultan's mamluks had a numerical advantage over two thousand janissaries. Along with the Turkmen cavalry Ramazanogullari and Turgudogullari, the commander of the sultan's mamluks Temruz ash-Shamsi managed to break in wedge formation into the Ottoman army line. The entire right flank was cut off from the center.

First, the Karaman army was defeated, its retreat, and the death of the Anatolia beylerbey caused panic in the Anatolia army. The two sons of Evrenos, commanding the akıncı on the right flank, also died, which led the surviving soldiers to flee for their lives. The soldiers of Karaman and Anatolia armies, retreating, looted the rear camp and fled to Karaman.

On the Ottoman left flank the advantage was with the Ottomans. After the Damascus army withdrew to the left Mamluk flank, the Rumelia army together with the kapikulu cavalry successfully attacked the Mamluk center, which was no longer defended by Temruz ash-Shamsi's sultan mamluks fighting the right Ottoman flank. Ottoman troops approached Ozbek. Seeing disorder nearby, Ozbek with the center army began to retreat. He crossed the Seyhan river, deciding to spend the night at the mountain foothills. Temruz ash-Shamsi's troops pursued fleeing soldiers from the Karaman and Anatolia armies and captured everything left in the camp.

Returning to the battlefield after looting the Ottoman camp, Temruz's mamluks saw that their center army was gone and thought it was defeated. They looted everything remaining in their own camp and fled to Aleppo via Bab al-Malik. By this time Hersekli Ahmed Pasha had gathered surviving boats and returned to the blockade site, hoping some Ottoman soldiers who had been thrown onto rocks during the storm had survived. The retreating mamluks of Temruz ash-Shamsi fell into the same trap as the Mamluk army vanguard before the battle. Many fell to Ottoman swords or gunfire. Some managed to escape, abandoning all loot.

=== Second phase: Ottoman retreat ===
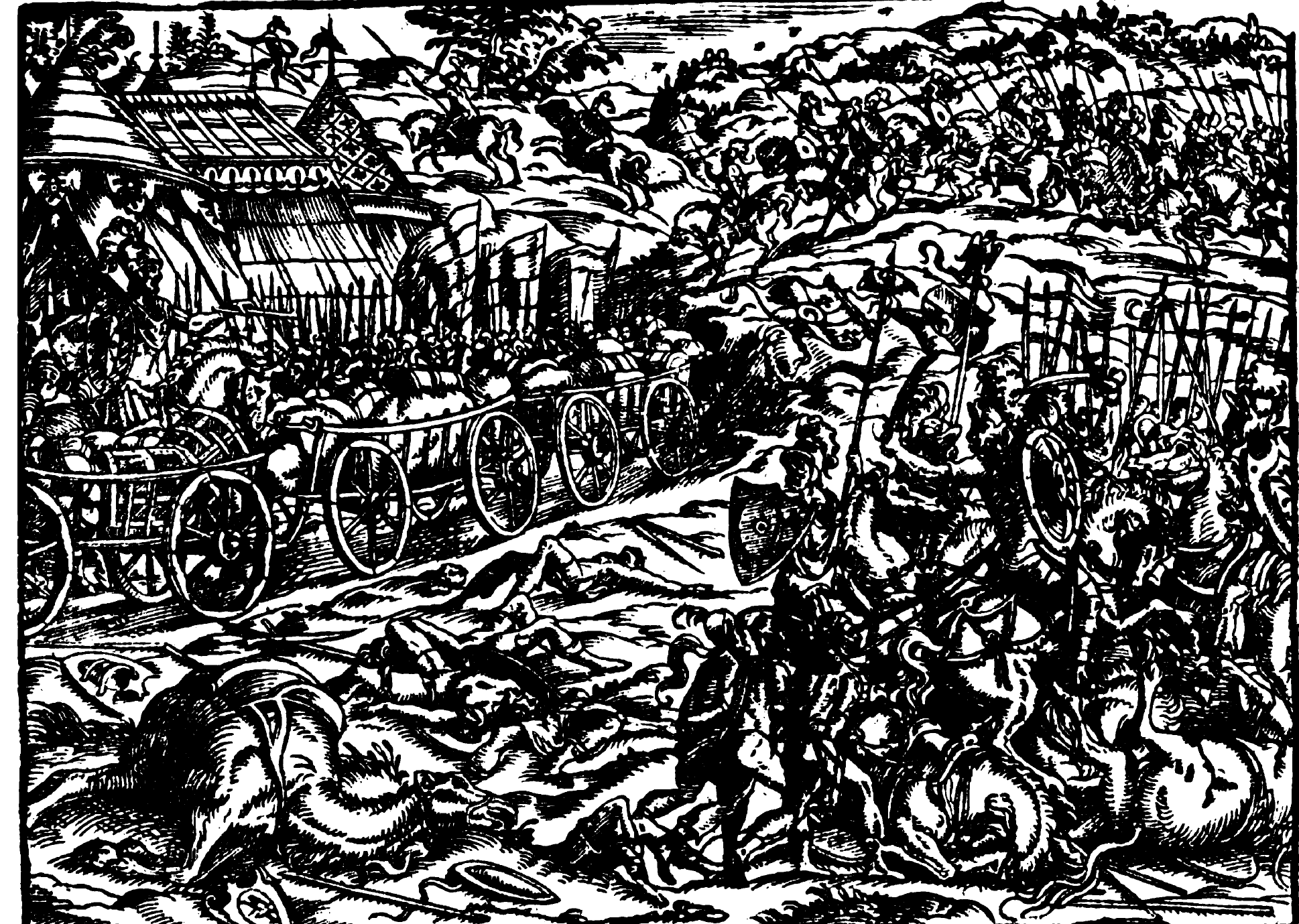
Episode of the battle

Ali Pasha decided to return to the camp, despite commanders from Rumelia wanting to pursue Ozbek. He saw the soldiers were exhausted and realized that further pursuit and fighting might result in a complete Ottoman defeat. Finding the camp completely ransacked and looted, Ali Pasha decided at least to secure it against sudden attacks. He surrounded it with 600 wagons equipped with cannons. Inspecting the army at the camp, Ali Pasha understood the losses were heavy, and due to the looting, he had nothing to feed the soldiers. They could withdraw to Adana, where food supplies were certain. But there was a risk of being trapped in a siege if they stayed in Adana. After consulting with commanders, Ali Pasha decided to retreat at night through the Cilician Gates to Ereğli.

During the march through the mountains from the Bolkar Dagh ridge, the remnants of the Ottoman army suffered further losses when attacked by Turkmens of the Varsak tribe. An anonymous Ottoman chronicle blames Alaüddevle Bozkurt, the ruler of Dulkadirids, for collaborating with the Varsak tribe. His scouts watched the battle and reported the Ottoman retreat to him. Alaüddevle sent a message to the Varsak leader, proposing to attack the Ottomans from the rear and provide his soldiers. When the Ottomans moved through the Cilician Gates, the Turkmens attacked, pursued, and killed as many as they could catch. They tried to capture Ali Pasha, but he managed to escape.

=== Casualties ===
D'Obusson, in a letter to Innocent VIII, wrote that about thirty thousand Ottomans were killed. A similar number was given by Caoursin: "More than thirty thousand Turks were killed at this place; the rest fled into the mountains or retreated to the fortress of Adena, which they had fortified shortly before." R. Knolles reported double that number: "the Turks under Kalibey and Herseoglu lost more than 60,000 men, not counting the many thousands who died fleeing in the mountains."

D'Obusson estimated Mamluk losses at Aga Chairi at eight thousand men.

== Consequences ==
On the night after the Ottoman army withdrew, Alaüddevle Bozkurt sent a message to Özbay informing him about the Ottoman retreat. In the morning, Özbay himself went to the Ottoman camp and sent Turkmens from the Ramazanogullari tribe to scout the mountains. When the scouts confirmed that the Ottomans had left, the Mamluk army marched on Adana and, with the help of the Turkmens, besieged the city. While Özbay was besieging Adana, Hersekli Ahmed Pasha decided to return the fleet to its base at Gallipoli. Ali Pasha, having barely reached Ereğli, sent a report of the battle to Bayezid and moved to Laranda.

There, he received orders from the Divan to arrest all commanders who fled the battlefield before arriving in Istanbul: the sanjakbey of Kayseri Yulariksidi Sinan Bey, the sanjakbey of Karasi Ishak Bey Kraloglu, Karadjapashoglu Iskender Chelebi, Kızıldju Muslem Bey from Rumelia, the sanjakbey Karagez Pasha, and others. All the arrested were imprisoned in the Rumelihisar fortress (Yeni Hisar). Karagez Pasha, who fled the battlefield for the second time, was immediately executed.

Bayezid intended to execute Ali Pasha and other commanders as well but eventually only dismissed them from their posts and sent them into exile. The Ottoman garrison in Adana was able to resist for three months, as the fortifications had been restored and supplies were full. However, an explosion in the gunpowder stores killed many Ottoman soldiers and commanders. After this, the Ottomans were forced to surrender the city. Tarsus was surrendered without a fight, and the Mamluk Sultan appointed Kansuh al-Ghuri as its wali for the third time.

Among the Mamluks, several high-ranking emirs were killed. As with the Ottomans, those who fled the battlefield were severely punished. Khalil ibn Ismail, the sheikh of Nablus, and his men, who left the battlefield early in the fight, were fined and imprisoned. A witness to the events, the qadi of Jerusalem Mujir al-Din, wrote: “The way they were treated was unheard of even during the times of Jahiliyyah”; “People sold their daughters as slaves, atrocities occurred, people wept loudly — the Holy Land had never known such suffering.”

The Mamluks managed to restore their fortresses in Çukurova and maintained influence over their client, the Dulkadirids beylik.

The brother of the beylik's ruler, loyal to the Ottomans and whom Bayezid wanted to place on the Dulkadir throne, was captured by the Mamluks and taken to Cairo. Özbay and Alaüddevle captured the territory of Karaman. The Battle of Ağaçayırı was the Ottomans' most catastrophic defeat since the Battle of Ankara. It was the third major defeat since the start of the Ottoman–Mamluk war. After this, Bayezid was forced to consider making peace.

== Works cited ==
- Alıç, S. (2016). Alaüddevle (Bozkurt) Bey. Vol. 1. Kahramanmaraş Sütçü İmam Üniversitesi Yayınları. pp. 189–195.
- Caoursin, Guillaume (1683). The History of the Turkish War with the Rhodians, Venetians, Egyptians, Persians, and Other Nations ... Will. Whitwood, next to the George Inn in Little Brittain. pp. 321–323.
- Cezar, M.; Sertoğlu, M. (2010). Mufassal Osmanlı tarihi: resimli-haritalı. Vol. 2. Türk Tarih Kurumu Basımevi. ISBN 9789751623409.
- da Lezze, D. (1909). Historia turchesca (1300–1514). Academia Română.
- Fisher, S. N. (1948). The Foreign Relations of Turkey, 1481-1512. University of Illinois Press.
- Har-El, Shai (1995). "The Battle of Aga-Cayri". Struggle for Domination in the Middle East: The Ottoman-Mamluk War, 1485–1491. The Ottoman Empire and its Heritage. Vol. 4. Leiden; New York: E. J. Brill. pp. 163–191. ISBN 978-90-04-10180-7. ISSN 1380-6076. LCCN 94-40784. OCLC 31434541.
- Knolles, Richard (1704). The Turkish History, Comprehending the Origin of that Nation, and the Growth of the Othoman Empire: ... Written by Mr. Knolls, Continued by Sir Paul Rycaut to ... 1699. and Abridg'd by Mr. Savage. Revised and Approved by ... Sir Paul Rycaut, and Adorn'd with Nine and Twenty Copper Plates ... The Second Edition Carefully Corrected, Improv'd and Brought Down to this Present Year, 1704. With an Addition of the Life of the Impostor Mahomet, by the Same Author. ... Isaac Cleave.
- Lellouch, B.; Michel, N. (2012). Conquête ottomane de l'Égypte (1517): Arrière-plan, impact, échos. BRILL. ISBN 978-90-04-22519-0.
- Sansovino, Fr. (1573). Gl' annali Turcheschi, overo vite dei principi della casa Othomana.
- Sanudo, M. (1903). I diarii di Marino Sanuto ... F. Visentini.
- Uyar, M.; Erickson, E. J. (2009). A Military History of the Ottomans: From Osman to Atatürk. ABC-CLIO. ISBN 978-0-275-98876-0.
- Woods, J. E. (1979). Turco-Iranica I: An Ottoman Intelligence Report ... Vol. 38. pp. 1–9. doi:10.1086/372687. ISSN 0022-2968. JSTOR 544567.
- A New General Biographical Dictionary ... Vol. 5. Rich. Glag. 1848.
- Blackwood's Edinburgh Magazine. Blackwood. 1841.
