= Uzbek min Tutuh =

Mamluk commander (died 1499)

Uzbek
- Born: Unknown
- Died: 1499
- Allegiance: Mamluk Sultanate
- Rank: Atabeg
- Battles / wars: Shah Suwar Revolt; Second Mamluk Campaign (WIA); Third Mamluk Campaign; Ottoman–Mamluk War (1485–1491); Battle of Malatya (1485); Adana campaign; Battle of Aga-Cayiri; Siege of Kayseri

Uzbek min Tutuh was a Mamluk commander and governor of Damascus in the 15th century until his death in 1499. He is primarily known for his victories against the Ottomans during the Ottoman–Mamluk War (1485–1491) and for founding the Azbakiya district in Cairo.

== Early life ==
The only known detail about his life outside of his military career is that he was the son-in-law of the former Mamluk sultan Sayf al-Din Jaqmaq, marrying his daughter Khadijah on 13 March 1450.

== Military career ==
=== Shah Suwar Revolt ===
In 1466, Shah Suwar, a Turkmen lord, seized the Dulkadirid throne after deposing his brother, Shah Budak. In February 1468, all of the Syrian Mamluk governors and their forces joined a campaign near Aleppo and marched to Aintab, which was under Dulkadirid control. After a few days, Shah Suwar ambushed the Mamluk army, provoking them into a pursuit. On 30 May 1468, he decisively defeated the Mamluks near a forested area, killing many of their emirs and capturing Kulaksiz. Uzbek Bey was severely wounded in the battle but managed to escape with the help of the Ramadanid ruler Hasan Bey.

Shah Suwar grew more confident following his victory. While part of his army raided the Kurdish-populated regions toward Aleppo, another contingent began occupying cities and fortresses held by the Ramadanids. Exploiting the Ottoman campaign against the rival Karamanids, Shah Suwar captured Vahka and entrusted it to his brother Yunus Beg. He later besieged Sis and installed his ally Umar Beg (r. 1470–1485) as the new Ramadanid ruler.

By early 1469, preparations for a new campaign were complete. Another Mamluk army, led by Uzbek and the deposed Shah Budak, departed from Cairo and joined other forces near Aleppo in February. The Mamluks confronted Shah Suwar on the left bank of the Ceyhan River, southwest of Marash, in April 1469. The Dulkadirid army was defeated, and Suwar's brother Mughulbay was killed. Shah Suwar fled to Kadirli through the mountains, stationing his remaining troops along the passes. In June, while the Mamluk army was preparing to retreat to Egypt due to supply shortages, the Dulkadirids launched another ambush. Despite taking significant casualties, Uzbek Bey was able to escape unharmed.

After returning to Cairo, Uzbek Bey never again commanded an army against Shah Suwar. However, the rebellion was eventually suppressed. Following Shah Suwar’s capture, Uzbek personally brought him before Sultan Qaitbay.

=== Ottoman–Mamluk War ===
In 1485, Ala al-Dawla Bozkurt, the Dulkadirid ruler, supported by the Ottoman Empire, attacked the Mamluk city of Malatya, winning the first battle and initiating the war. After the battle, Ala al-Dawla returned to Dulkadirid territory. To reinforce their position, the Ottomans sent an army of 20,000 soldiers to Malatya and another force to Adana.

In response, Sultan Qaitbay dispatched Uzbek Bey. Near Malatya, Uzbek ambushed and killed the Ottoman governor of Kayseri, Yakup Bey, along with the entire Ottoman force. He also expelled Ottoman forces from Tarsus.

Later that year, Bayezid II launched a major land and sea campaign against the Mamluks. Karagöz Mehmed Pasha, the new governor of Karaman, led Ottoman forces that subdued rebellious Turkmen tribes and captured numerous Cilician fortresses. However, on 9 February 1486, Karagöz Mehmed was defeated outside Adana. Reinforcements from Istanbul, including Janissaries under Hersekzade Ahmed Pasha, were also defeated on 15 March. Karagöz fled, and Hersekzade was captured. As a result, Cilicia returned to Mamluk control.

In 1488, the Ottomans launched another major invasion of Cilicia with an army of 60,000–120,000. On 26 August, the two sides clashed at Ağaçayırı, where Uzbek Bey once again defeated the Ottoman army, reportedly killing half of it. Ottoman commander Ali Pasha was wounded, and thousands more Ottomans died during their retreat through the mountains.

In 1490, Uzbek led Mamluk forces—many survivors of the battle of Ağaçayırı—into Ottoman territory. They captured Karaman and besieged Kayseri. Bayezid II responded by sending another army of 30,000–60,000 under the command of Hersekzade Ahmed Pasha who had recently been released by the Mamluks as part of a peace attempt. While trying to break the siege of Kayseri, Ahmed Pasha was captured and brought to Cairo. The war concluded soon afterward with a peace agreement, restoring both sides to their pre-war borders.

== Death and legacy ==
Uzbek Bey died in 1499 of unknown causes. Today, the Azbakeya district in Cairo bears his name, commemorating his role in founding the area.

== Family ==
- Khadijah (1433/34–30 January 1463): His wife whom he married in 1450
- Emir Kanbek (d.1516): His cousin (uncle's son) and governor of Tabuk

== See also ==
- Ottoman–Mamluk War (1485–1491)
- Shah Suwar
