= Battle of Malatya (1485) =

Battle between the Ottomans and Mamluks in 1485

- Part of the Ottoman–Mamluk War (1485–1491)
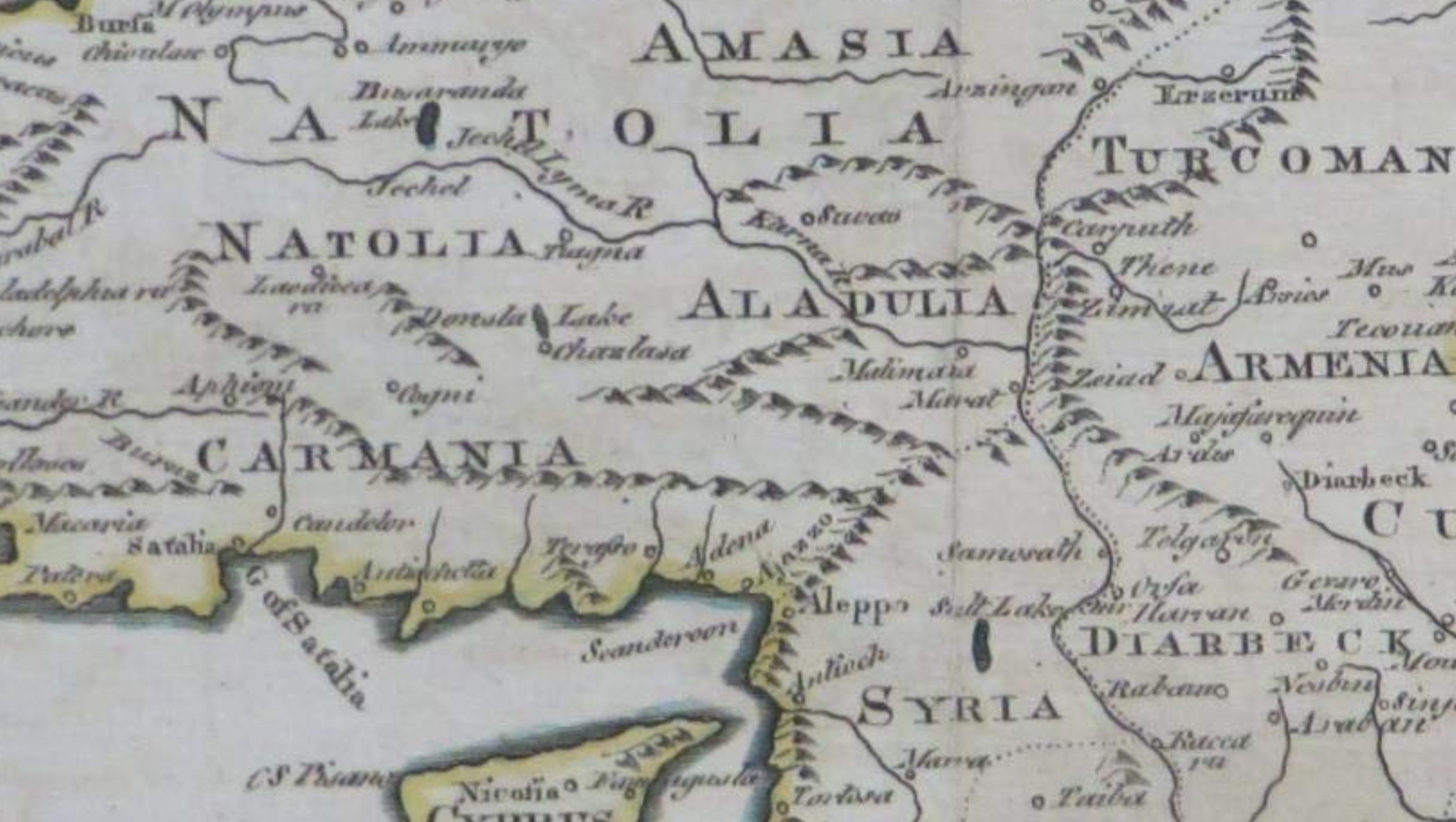
- Domains of Ala al-Dawla
| Date | May–June 1485 |
| Location | Malatya, Mamluk Sultanate (modern day Turkey) |
| Result | Mamluk victory See full result: 1st battle: Ottoman–Dulkadirid victory 2nd battle: Mamluk victory |

Belligerents
| Dulkadirids; Ottoman Empire | Mamluk Sultanate |

Commanders and leaders
| Bozkurt of Dulkadir; Shahqubad Feyyaz (WIA); Yakup Bey † | (Mamluk Sultanate) Uzbek Bey (Mamluk Sultanate) Bish Beg |

Strength
| Unknown but less than the Mamluks; ~20,000 | (Mamluk Sultanate) Unknown, likely less or equal |

Casualties and losses
| Unknown; Entire army | (Mamluk Sultanate) Heavy |

The Battle of Malatya was fought in 1485 between the Ottoman Empire and the Mamluk Sultanate near the city of Malatya. It marked the first major engagement of the Ottoman–Mamluk War (1485–1491), ending in a Mamluk victory and setting the stage for further conflict in eastern Anatolia.

== Background ==
When Bayezid II ascended the Ottoman throne in 1481, his brother Cem Sultan, who enjoyed great support in Anatolia, rose up and contended with him for the throne. After he was defeated in battle, he sought refuge first in the Ramadanids, and from there passed into Mamluk domains. Although the Mamluks declined to offer him any military support, this act aroused the hostility of Bayezid, which was further fanned when the Mamluks seized an Ottoman ambassador who was returning from Deccan with an Indian ambassador and gifts for the Ottoman Sultan. Bozkurt of Dulkadir laid siege to the Mamluk-held city of Malatya in July 1483 in response to Mamluk harboring of Cem Sultan but was defeated.

== First battle of Malatya ==
In May 1485, the Dulkadirids, supported by the Ottomans, invaded Mamluk territory and captured Malatya with little resistance. Meanwhile, the Ottomans under Karagöz Pasha launched a campaign into Cilicia. Upon hearing the news, Sultan Qaitbay dispatched an army under the command of Uzbek Bey. Bozkurt, who had a smaller force, requested help from Bayezid. The sultan responded by sending an army of 20,000 under Yakup Bey, the sanjak-bey of Kayseri. Yakup Bey defeated the Mamluk army and killed or captured many of the army's leaders.

== Second battle of Malatya ==
After this defeat, the Mamluk commander named Bish Beg set a trap for the Ottoman army, Bozkurt Beg, who heard about this trap, withdrew from the region and left Yakup Bey without informing him. Later, Uzbek Bey ambushed and annihilated the Ottoman army. Yakup Bey was also killed in this ambush, while some sources say he was wounded but escaped. With no Ottoman army left in the area, Uzbek proceeded into Anatolia to reclaim territories captured by the Ottomans. Bozkurt, who was engaged in reinforcing his army, failed to support the Ottomans as promised, which contributed to the Mamluk victory and restoration of Mamluk control over the Cilician Plain.

== Aftermath ==
Despite attempts to broker peace by the Mamluks, the Ottomans continued launching offensives that would eventually result in the temporary Ottoman conquest of Cilicia, before it was reconquered by the Mamluks.

== See also ==
- Ottoman–Mamluk War (1485–1491)
- Siege of Malatya (1315)
- Battle of Malatya (1473)
- Uzbek Bey
- Qaitbay
- Bozkurt of Dulkadir
