= Adana campaign =

1485 Mamluk victory over the Ottomans

- Part of the Ottoman–Mamluk War (1485–1491)
Date	9 February – 15 March 1485
Location	Adana, modern day Turkey
Result	Mamluk victory

Belligerents
Mamluk Sultanate	Ottoman Empire

Commanders and leaders
Atabey Uzbek; Uzdamur al-Sayfi; Doğan al-Safi (surrendered); Ömer Beg (POW); Gündüzoğlu Mehmed Beg †; Özeroğlu Mekki Beg; Kajmas al-Ishaki	Prince Şehinşah; Ahmed Pasha (POW); Kızıl Ahmed Beg (POW); Karagöz Mehmed Pasha; Hızıroğlu Mehmed Pasha

Units involved
Royal Mamluks; Amir Mamluks; Syrian Infantrymen	Ottoman Garrison; Janissaries; Sipahis; Local forces

Strength
12,000+: 3,000 Royal Mamluks; 9 Amir's of 1,000	Unknown but more: 1,500 Garrison soldiers

Casualties and losses
Unknown	40,000: Entire Garrison

The Adana campaign occurred after Ottoman forces seized the city of Adana from the Mamluk Sultanate. The Mamluks responded by sending a force under Commander and Chief Uzbek, and besieged Adana. The Ottomans responded by sending a large relief force that was defeated.

== Background ==
The Ottoman Empire had launched a campaign in 1485 against the Mamluk holdings in Southern Turkey and in Cicilia Armenia, seizing areas such as Adana. The Mamluk Forces in the Taurus Mountains withdrew to Aleppo. In order to respond, Sultan Qaitbey had Atabeg Uzbek launch a counter offensive. To this cause Qaitbey had granted Uzbek 3,000 Royal Mamluks as well as Nine of the 15 Emirs of 1,000. The force set off from Cairo over Damascus to Aleppo, recruiting local Syrian peasants along the way. In February the Mamluks arrived at Adana.

== First Battle of Adana ==
After a peace message by Uzbek was ignored, the Mamluks confronted an Ottoman force outside the city. The Ottomans were quickly routed, with many fleeing. Around 800 were captured, including 17 commanders and paraded in Damascus, Aleppo, and Cairo. After the battle, the Mamluks besieged Adana.

== Second Battle of Adana ==
When Sultan Bayezid II learned of the offensive on Adana, he sent Hersek-oglu to lead an Ottoman army to relieve Adana. Hersek-oglu was the son of Stjepan Vukčić, Duke of Herzegovina, who was sent as a hostage to the court of Mehmed II. There he grew up with Bayezid. When Bayezid seized power, he allowed Kersek-oglu to marry one of his daughters, and also granted him a high position. When Hersek-oglu's approached the Mamluk Army, his reconnaissance unit was routed by the Mamluks. The survivors managed to report that the Mamluks had less than 15,000 soldiers. The battle occurred on 15 March. There, Hersek-oglu's forces suffered a massive defeat. The Turkmen contingents fled during the beginning of the battle. Hersek-oglu and 200 of his Janissaries fought on, despite being encircled. He was wounded and captured by the Mamluks. Among the captives were also the son of the late vezir Mustafa Pasha, Kiral-oglu, (son of Isfendiyar-oğlu) Kızıl Ahmed, (Sanjakbegi of Kengırı) Ahmed Beg, and the sultan's chief pantry-keeper (kilerjibaşı) Süleyman Aga.

After the battle, the Adana garrison of 1,500 fighters also surrendered.

== Results ==
The Ottoman prisoners were sent to Syria. The Mamluk victory allowed the Mamluks to re-establish control of Tartus and Adana. Despite attempts to broker peace by the Mamluks, the Ottomans would continue to launch further offensives which would eventually lead to the Ottoman conquest of Cilicia.
