= Koca Mustafa Pasha =

Grand Vizier of the Ottoman Empire from 1511 to 1512

Koca Damat Mustafa Pasha
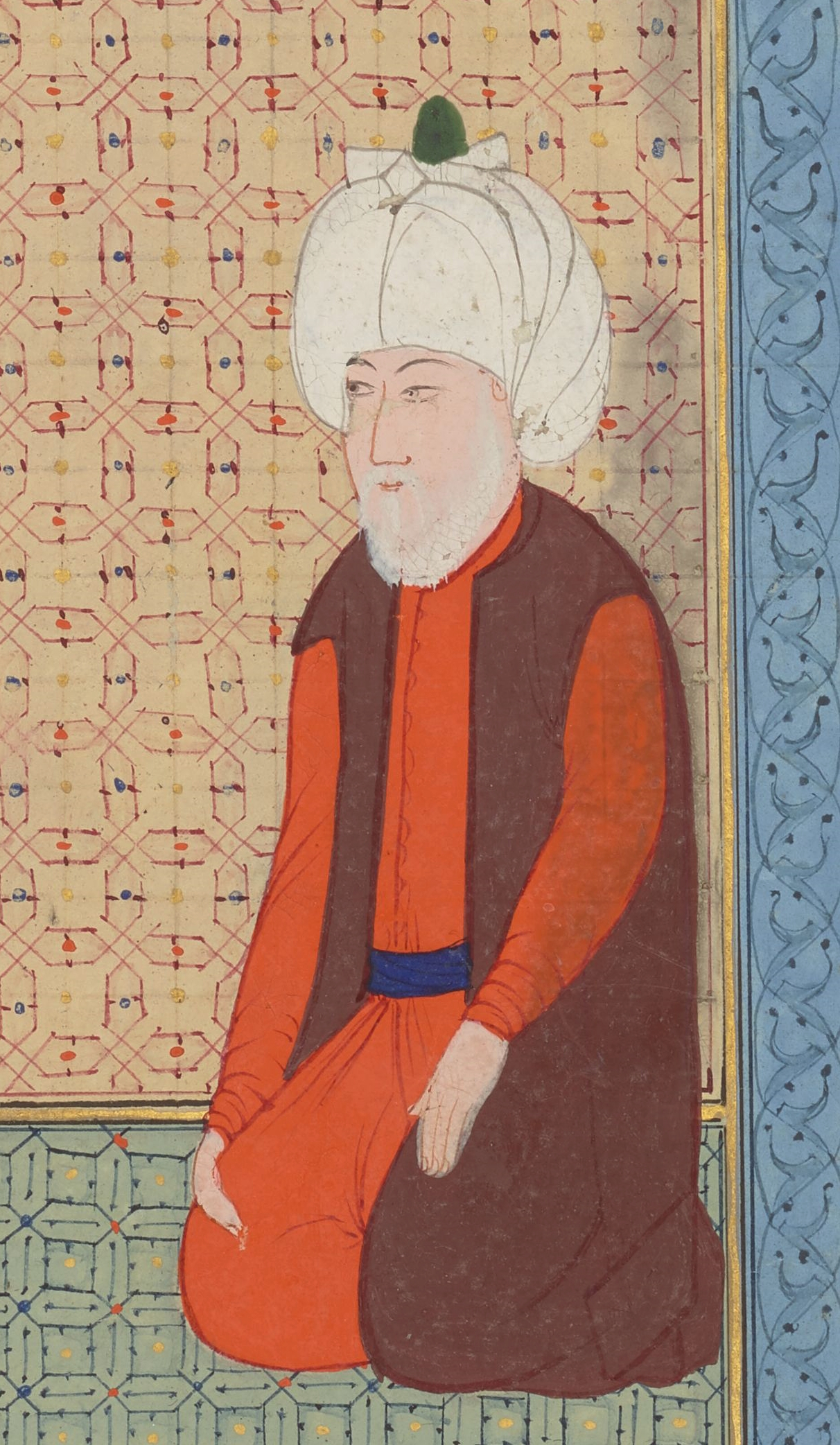
- Grand Vizier Koca Mustafa Pasha, from "The Cream of Histories" (Zubdat al-tawarikh), 1585-90

Grand Vizier of the Ottoman Empire
- In office 1511–1512
- Monarch: Bayezid II
- Preceded by: Hersekzade Ahmed Pasha
- Succeeded by: Hersekzade Ahmed Pasha

Personal details
- Died: 1512 Bursa, Ottoman Empire
- Spouse: Kamerşah Sultan (m. 1491)
- Children: Hundi Hanımsultan; Sultanzade Osman Bey

Koca Mustafa Pasha (Ottoman Turkish: قوجه مصطفی پاشا; died 1512) was an Ottoman statesman. He was grand vizier of the Ottoman Empire from 1511 to 1512. He was Roman (Rum) and probably not a devşirme.

== Life ==
He started his career as kapıcıbaşı (chief doorkeeper) of the Topkapi Palace; in this office he acted also as the Master of Ceremonies at receptions of foreign ambassadors. He married a daughter of Sultan Bayezid II, Kamerşah Sultan, in 1491 and by her he had a daughter, Hundi Hanımsultan, who married Mesih Bey and a son, Sultanzade Osman Bey. Appointed grand vizier near the end of the reign of Bayezid II, he was executed in 1512. In Istanbul he let convert into mosques two ancient Byzantine churches, which were both named after him: Koca Mustafa Pasha and Atik Mustafa Pasha Mosque.

== Sources ==
- Eyice, Semavi (1955). Istanbul: Petit guide à travers les monuments byzantins et turcs (in French). Istanbul: Istanbul Matbaası.
- Müller-Wiener, Wolfgang (1977). Bildlexikon Zur Topographie Istanbuls: Byzantion, Konstantinupolis, Istanbul Bis Zum Beginn D. 17 Jh (in German). Tübingen: Wasmuth. ISBN 978-3-8030-1022-3.

Political offices
Preceded by Hersekzade Ahmed Pasha	Grand Vizier of the Ottoman Empire; 1511–1512	Succeeded by Hersekzade Ahmed Pasha
