= Gazi Atik Ali Pasha Mosque =

15th-century Ottoman mosque in Istanbul, Turkey

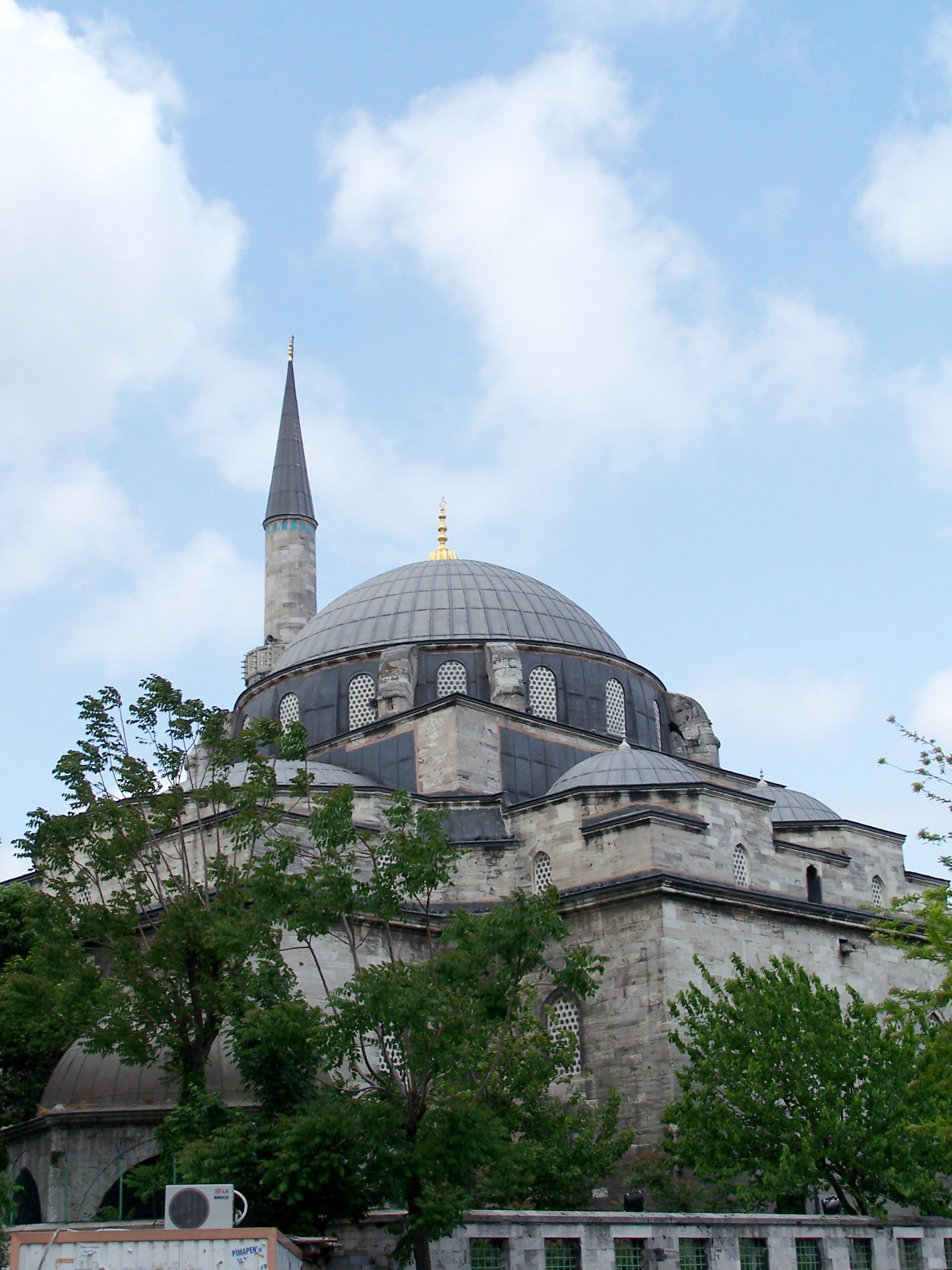

- Location in the Fatih district of Istanbul

Religion
- Affiliation: Islam

Location
- Location: Çemberlitaş, Fatih, Istanbul, Turkey
- Coordinates: 41.008720°N 28.970550°E

Architecture
- Type: Mosque
- Style: Ottoman architecture
- Groundbreaking: 1496
- Completed: 1497
- Minaret: 1

The Gazi Atik Ali Pasha Mosque (Turkish: Gazi Atik Ali Paşa Camii) is a 15th-century Ottoman mosque located in the Çemberlitaş neighbourhood of the Fatih district in Istanbul, Turkey. Its construction was started under the orders of the future Grand Vizier Hadım Atik Ali Pasha in 1496, and was completed in 1497, during the reign of Sultan Bayezid II. The mosque is located near the entrance to the Kapalıçarşı (Grand Bazaar), the Column of Constantine, and the historical Nuruosmaniye Mosque.

== See also ==
- Islamic architecture
- List of mosques
- Ottoman architecture
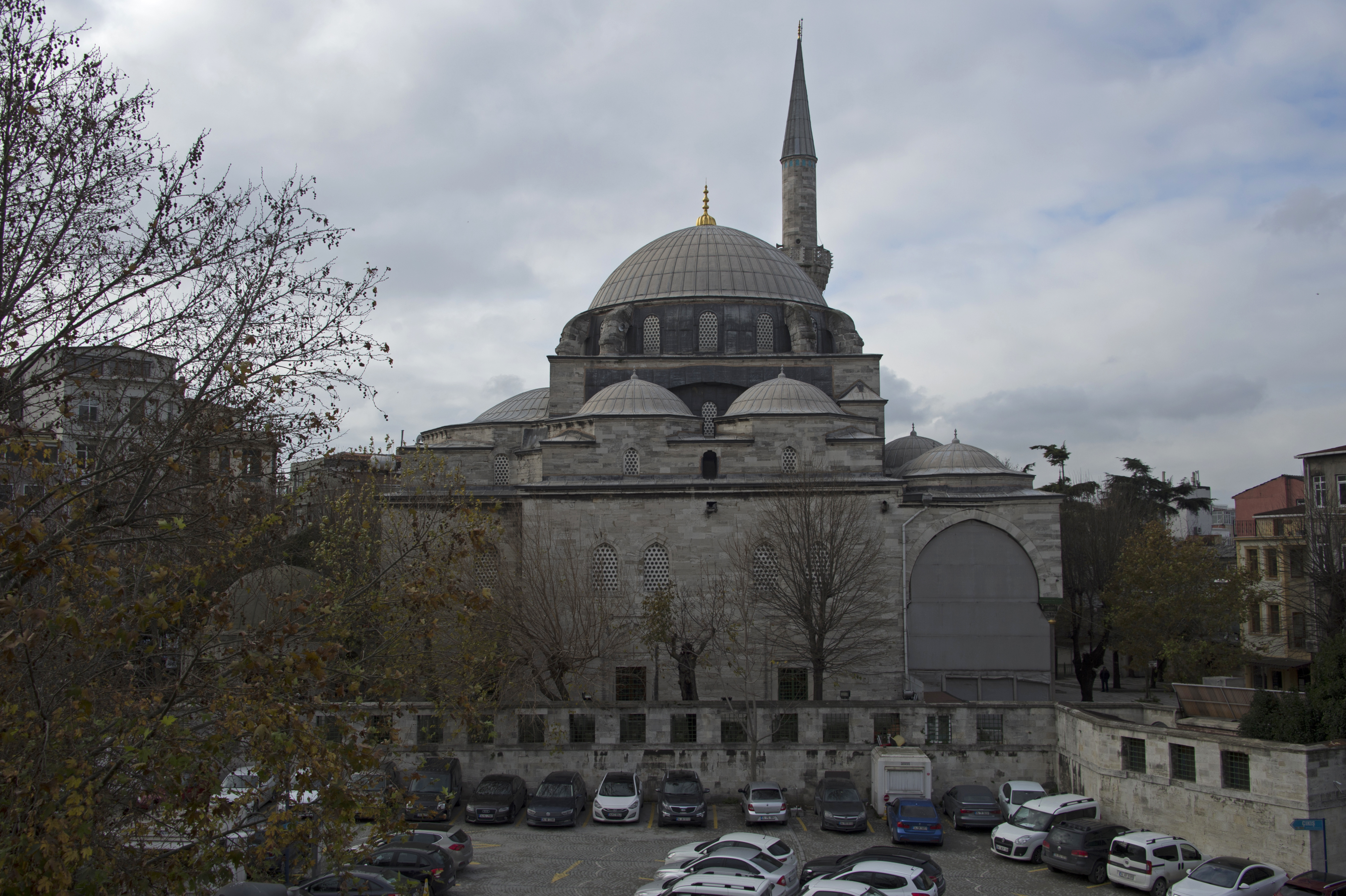
Atik Ali Pasha Mosque back side seen from nearby han

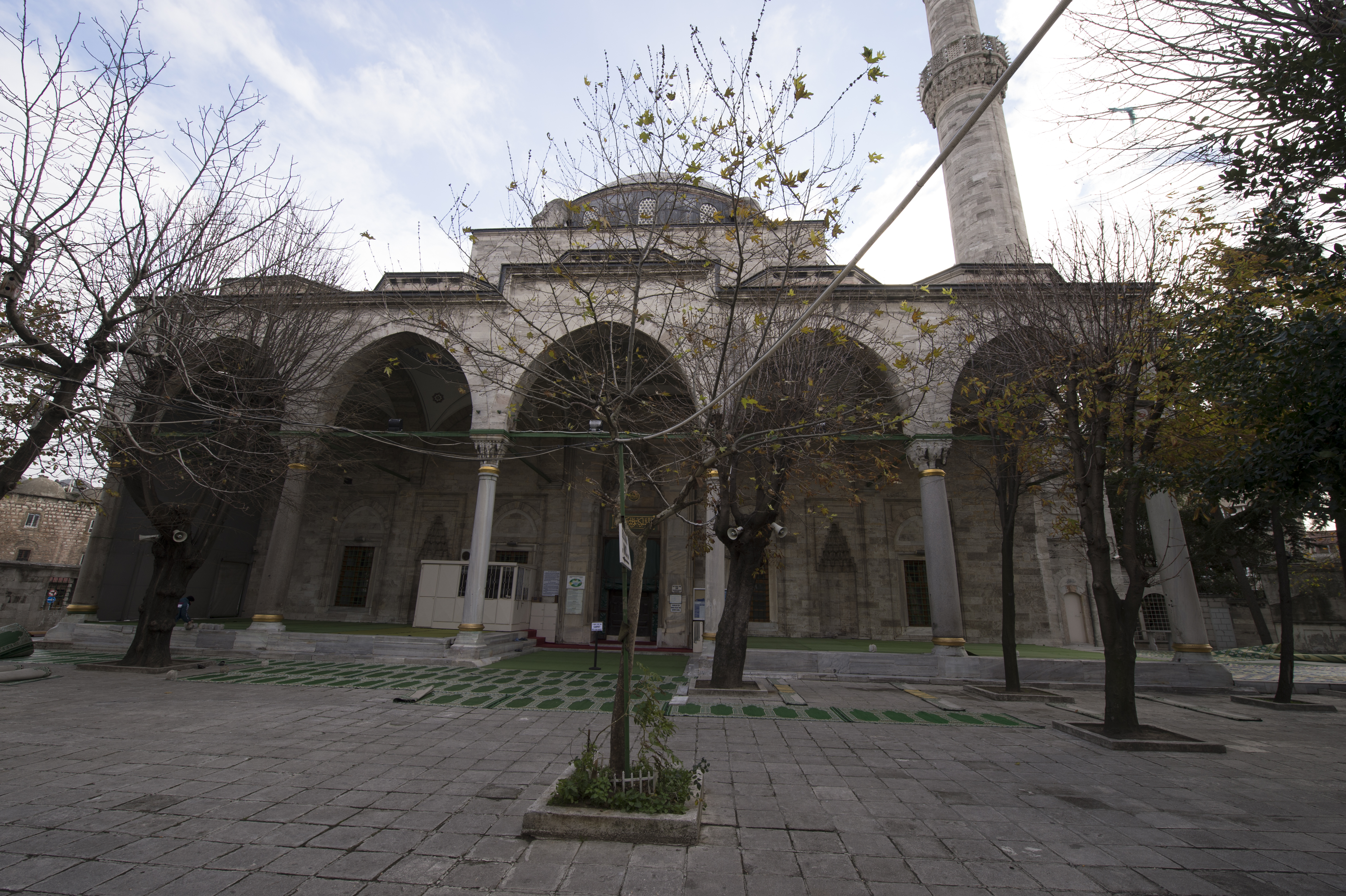
Atik Ali Pasha Mosque facade

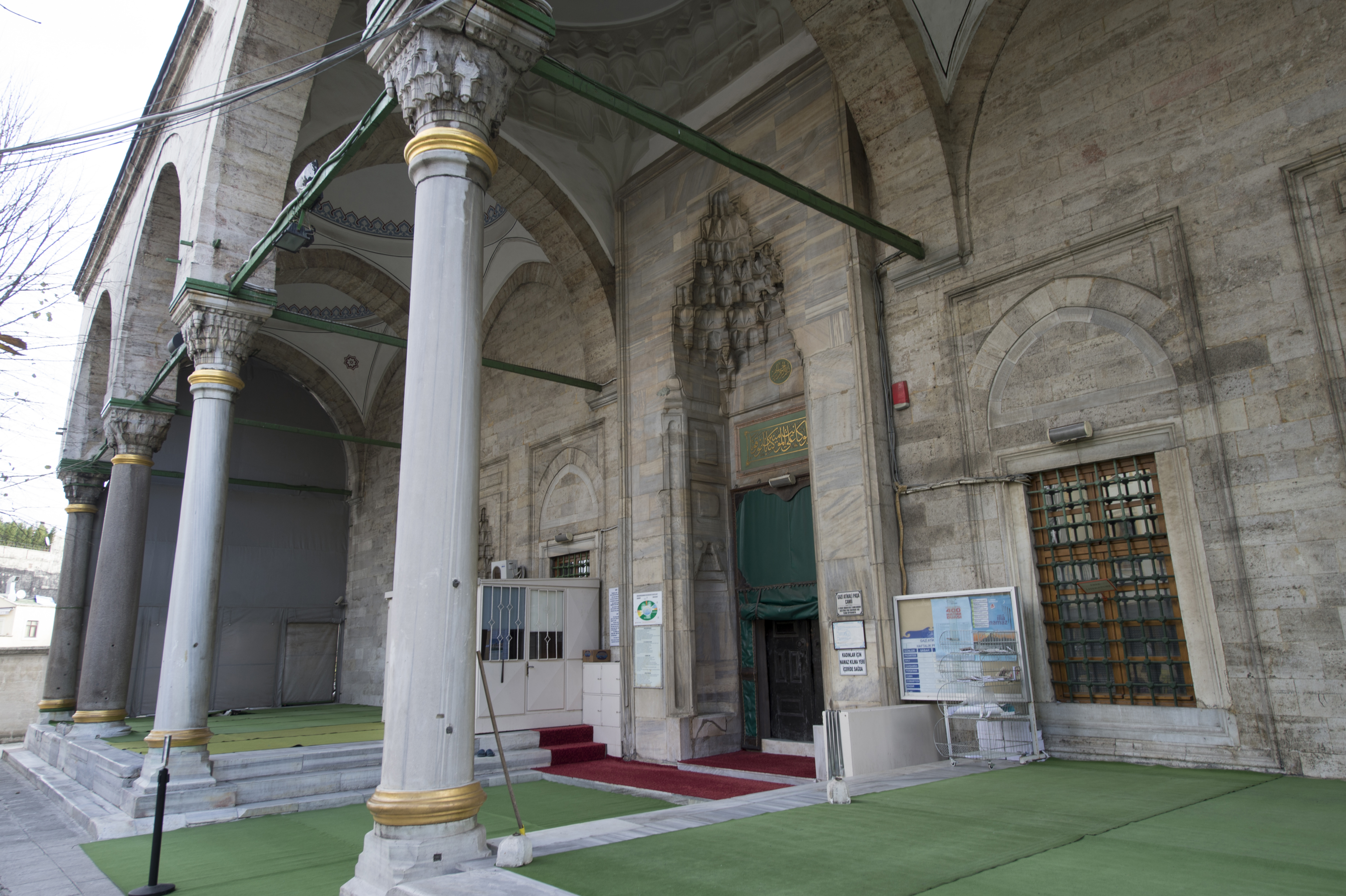
Atik Ali Pasha Mosque front

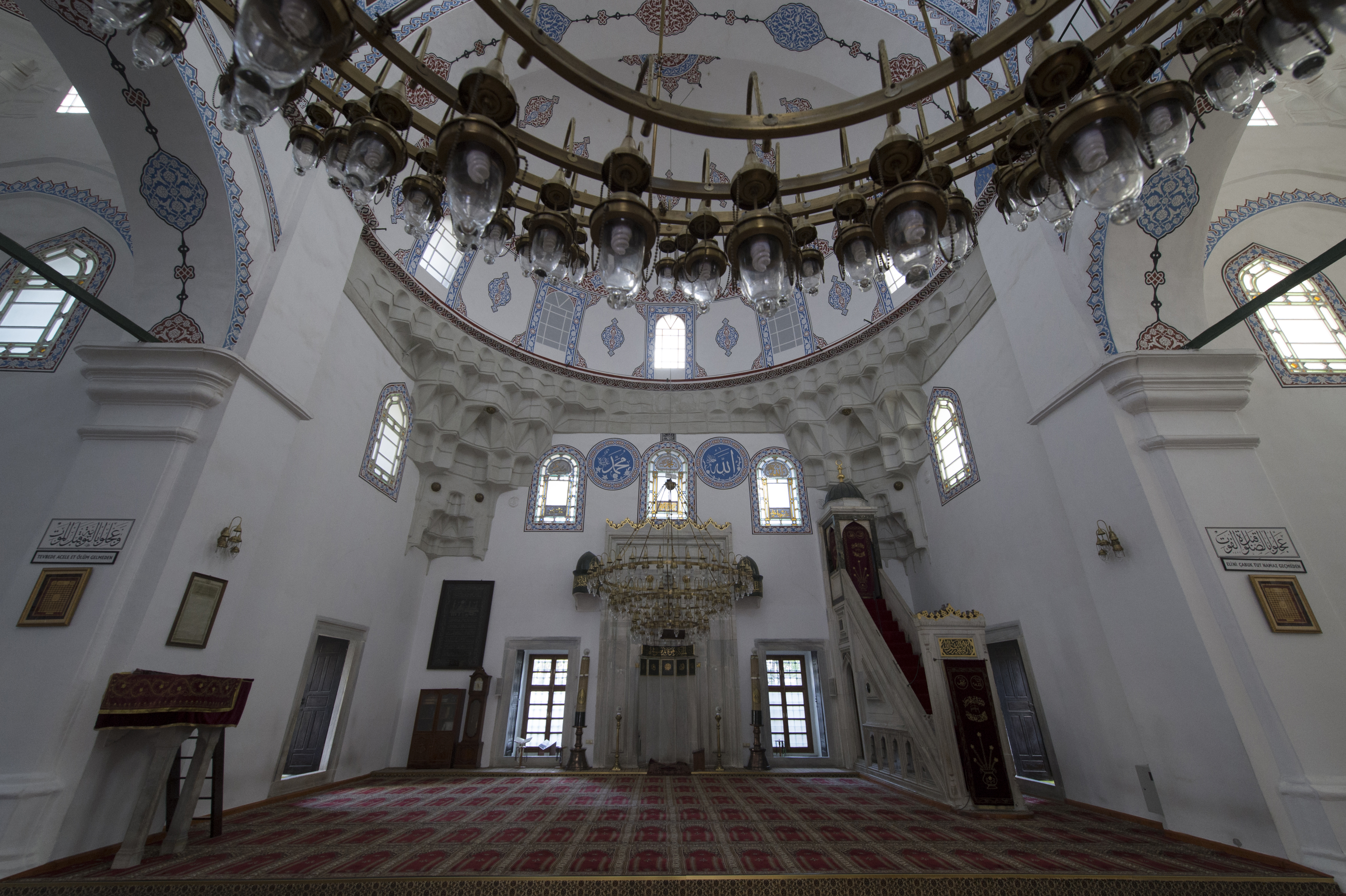
Atik Ali Pasha Mosque interior

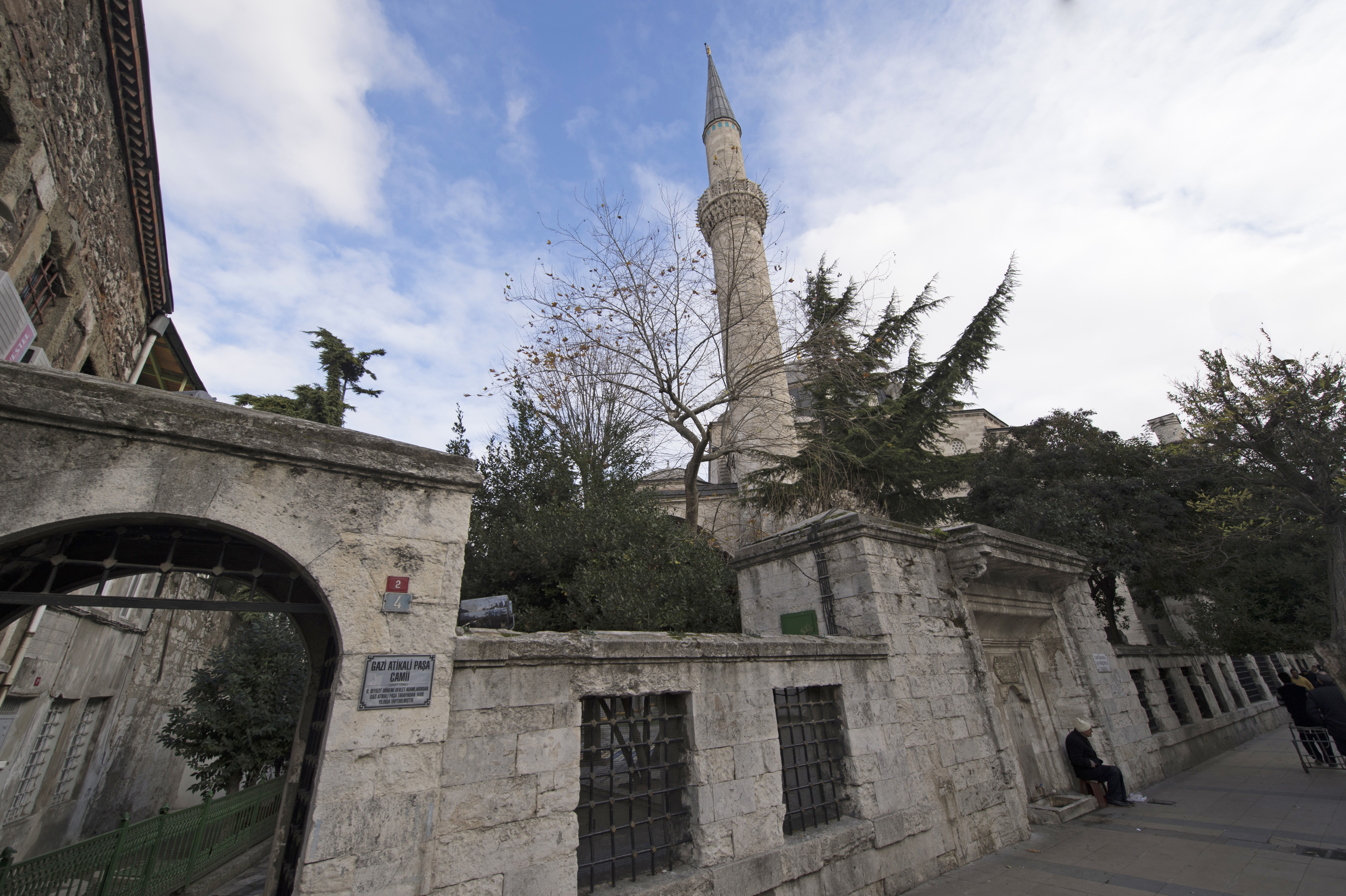
Atik Ali Pasha Mosque from Divan Yolu
