= Drozgometva =

- Village
- Location within Bosnia and Herzegovina
- Coordinates: 43°50′N 18°10′E
- Country: Bosnia and Herzegovina
- Entity: Federation of Bosnia and Herzegovina
- Canton: Sarajevo
- Municipality: Hadžići

Area
  - Total: 1.87 sq mi (4.85 km^{2})

Population (2013)
  - Total: 298
  - Density: 159/sq mi (61.4/km^{2})
- Time zone: UTC+1 (CET)
  - Summer (DST): UTC+2 (CEST)

Drozgometva is a village in the municipality of Hadžići, Bosnia and Herzegovina.

== Demographics ==
According to the 2013 census, its population was 298.

Ethnicity in 2013
Ethnicity	Number	Percentage
Bosniaks	276	92.6%
Croats	3	1.0%
Serbs	2	0.7%
other/undeclared	17	5.7%
Total	298	100%

== History ==
Ottoman grand vizier Hadım Ali Pasha (died in 1511) was a native of Drozgometva.
