= List of acts of the Parliament of Scotland from 1485 =

This is a list of acts of the Parliament of Scotland for the year 1485.

It lists acts of Parliament of the old Parliament of Scotland, that was merged with the old Parliament of England to form the Parliament of Great Britain, by the Union with England Act 1707 (c. 7).

For other years, see list of acts of the Parliament of Scotland. For the period after 1707, see list of acts of the Parliament of Great Britain.

== 1485 ==
Continuing the 13th parliament of James III.

Short title, or popular name	Citation	Royal assent
Long title
Church Act 1485 (repealed)	1485 c. 1 (Note: This is the citation in the Record Edition.) — (Note: This act is not listed in the Duodecimal Edition.)	26 May 1485
Of the fredome of halikirk. Of the freedom of the holy church. (Repealed by Statute Law Revision (Scotland) Act 1906 (6 Edw. 7. c. 38))
England Act 1485 (repealed)	1485 c. 2 —	26 May 1485
Anent the pece now takin betuix our soverane lord and Richard king of Ingland (Note: Richard III of England.)—And the meriage and aliance appunctit to be maid and performyt. Regarding the peace now holding between our sovereign lord and Richard king of England: And the marriage and alliance appointed to be made and performed. (Repealed by Statute Law Revision (Scotland) Act 1906 (6 Edw. 7. c. 38))
Esk Water Act 1485 (repealed)	1485 c. 3 —	26 May 1485
Anent the fischgarth of Esk debatable betuix the Realmes. Regarding the enclosed fishing pool of Esk, contested between the realms. (Repealed by Statute Law Revision (Scotland) Act 1906 (6 Edw. 7. c. 38))
Circuit Courts Act 1485 (repealed)	1485 c. 4; 1483 c. 94 (Note: This is the citation in the Duodecimal Edition.)	26 May 1485
Of Justice airis to be haldin in all partis of the Realme twys in the yer—and of Remissions and Respittis. Of Justice ayres to be held in all parts of the Realm twice in the year: and of Remissions and Respites. (Repealed by Statute Law Revision (Scotland) Act 1906 (6 Edw. 7. c. 38))
Embassy to Pope Act 1485 (repealed)	1485 c. 5 —	26 May 1485
Of an ambassat to our haly fader the paip. Of an embassy to our holy father the pope. (Repealed by Statute Law Revision (Scotland) Act 1906 (6 Edw. 7. c. 38))
Embassy to Pope (No. 2) Act 1485 (repealed)	1485 cc. 6-12 —	26 May 1485
Materis to be put in the Instruccions that salbe gevin to the commissionaris forsaid to be send to the paip. Matters to be put in the Instructions that shall be given to the commissioners aforesaid to be sent to the pope. (Repealed by Statute Law Revision (Scotland) Act 1906 (6 Edw. 7. c. 38))
Ferries Act 1485 (repealed)	1485 c. 13; 1483 c. 95	26 May 1485
Of feriaris that takis duble and trible fraucht. Of ferries that take double and triple fares. (Repealed by Statute Law Revision (Scotland) Act 1906 (6 Edw. 7. c. 38))
Letters to Pope as to Benefices Act 1485 (repealed)	1485 c. 14 —	26 May 1485
Of speciale letteris to be writtin to the paip tuiching benefices elective. Of special letters to be written to the pope touching elective benefices. (Repealed by Statute Law Revision (Scotland) Act 1906 (6 Edw. 7. c. 38))
Fineness of Silver Work Act 1485 (repealed)	1485 c. 15; 1483 c. 96	26 May 1485
For eschewing of the dammage sustenit be the liegis in the mynysyng in the finace of silver werk. For avoiding the damage sustained by the subjects in the reductions of the fineness of silver work. (Repealed by Statute Law Revision (Scotland) Act 1906 (6 Edw. 7. c. 38))
Money Act 1485 (repealed)	1485 c. 16 —	26 May 1485
Of the cours of the money and for the in bringing of bulyone—And anent the plakkis and half plakkis. Of the circulation of the money, and for the importation of bullion: And regarding the placks and half-placks. (Repealed by Statute Law Revision (Scotland) Act 1906 (6 Edw. 7. c. 38))
Barratry Act 1485 (repealed)	1485 c. 17 —	28 May 1485
Anent the execucion of the act (Note: (act of James II?)) aganis the purchessaris of benefices pertening to our soverane lordis presentacioun the sege vacand. Regarding the execution of the act against the purchasing of benefices pertaining to our sovereign lord's presentation during a vacant see. (Repealed by Statute Law Revision (Scotland) Act 1906 (6 Edw. 7. c. 38))

=== Sources ===
- Alexander, William (1841). "Acta Parliamentorum Regis Jacobi Tertii". An Abridgement of the Acts of the Parliaments of Scotland. Edinburgh: Adam and Charles Black. p. 445 – via Google Books.
- Alexander, William (1841). "Acta Parliamentorum Regis Jacobi Tertii". An Abridgement of the Acts of the Parliaments of Scotland. Edinburgh: Adam and Charles Black. p. 445 – via Google Books.
- Chronological Table of the Statutes. London: Her Majesty's Stationery Office. 1972. p. 1323 – via Google Books.
- "Index of Statutes: James III (1460-1488)". Records of the Parliaments of Scotland to 1707. University of St Andrews.

== See also ==
- List of legislation in the United Kingdom
- Records of the Parliaments of Scotland
