= Koca Davud Pasha =

Grand Vizier of the Ottoman Empire from 1482 to 1497

Koca · Damat Davud Pasha

Grand Vizier of the Ottoman Empire
- In office 1482–1497
- Monarch: Bayezid II
- Preceded by: Ishak Pasha
- Succeeded by: Hersekzade Ahmed Pasha

Personal details
- Born: c. 1446 Albania
- Died: 20 October 1498 (aged 51–52) Didymoteicho, Ottoman Empire (present-day Greece)
- Spouse: Fülane Sultan (m. 1489)
- Children: Sultanzade Mehmed Bey

Koca Davud Pasha (Turkish: Koca Davut Paşa; 1446–1498) was n Ottoman Albanian general and grand vizier of the Ottoman Empire from 1482 to 1497, during the reign of Bayezid II. He became a damat ("bridegroom") to the Ottoman dynasty by marrying an Ottoman princess, a daughter of Bayezid II whose name is unknown. They had a son, Sultanzade Mehmed Bey, who married his cousin Fatma Sultan, daughter of Şehzade Ahmed.

== Early life ==
Davud Pasha was a converted Muslim who had been a Christian Albanian. During his childhood he lived in Istanbul and was conscripted into the Ottoman army—his family had sent him there to pursue a career—where he converted to Islam.

== Military campaigns ==
In 1473, as Beylerbey of the Anatolian Eyalet, he was one of the commanders of the Ottoman army in the decisive victory against Ak Koyunlu at the Battle of Otlukbeli. In 1477, Sultan Mehmed II placed him in command of the army advancing toward Shkodër in Albania, directing him to besiege Krujë first. Davud Pasha captured the fortress, the League of Lezhë's last stronghold, thus ending the Ottoman–Albanian Wars. In 1479, he became governor (sanjakbey) of the Sanjak of Bosnia and, as commander of a large force of akıncı cavalry, carried out extensive attacks and raids against the Kingdom of Hungary.

As grand vizier, he led the Ottoman army in the 1487 campaign of the Ottoman–Mamluk War. Initially, Davud Pasha planned an all-out offensive expedition against the Mamluks, but Bayezid II canceled the plan and assigned him to attack the Turgutlu and Varsak tribes. When Davud Pasha reached the Turgut and Varsak territories, the Varsak leaders, including the tribal chief, submitted to him and swore allegiance to the Ottoman Empire.

He died in Didymoteicho on 20 October 1498, leaving behind a large estate, with which several public works were constructed.

== Public works ==
Davud Pasha's public works are mainly found in the Forum Arcadii area of modern Istanbul. There he built a mosque with 108 shops around it, a madrasa, a school, a hospice, a soup kitchen for the poor, and a public fountain dating to 1485. The whole neighborhood was consequently named after him as the Davutpaşa neighborhood, now part of the Fatih district. In the Yenikapı neighborhood he built a palace, a landing stage, eleven shops and public baths. His other public works include a bedestan in Bitola and shops in Skopje and Bursa. Davud Pasha's baths in modern Skopje are the largest baths in the Balkans; they are now used as an art gallery.

== See also ==
- List of Ottoman grand viziers

Political offices
Preceded by Ishak Pasha	Grand Vizier of the Ottoman Empire; 1482–1497	Succeeded by Hersekzade Ahmed Pasha
