= Koca =

Koca (a Turkish word meaning "great" or "large") may refer to:

== People ==
=== Epithet ===
- Koca Barbul Ban (died 1565), Wallachian rebel
- Koca Ragıp Pasha (1698–1763), Ottoman statesman
- Koča Andjelković (1755–1789), Serbian rebel
- Koca Hüsrev Mehmed Pasha (1769–1855), Ottoman admiral
- Koca Mustafa Reşid Pasha (1800–1858), Ottoman statesman
- Koca Yusuf (1857–1898), Turkish professional wrestler
- Koca Mi'mâr Sinân Âğâ (1488/1490-1588), Ottoman architect and civil engineer

=== Surname ===
- Atilla Koca (born 1980), Turkish footballer
- Fahrettin Koca (born 1965), Turkish physician and politician
- Gülcan Koca (born 1990), Turkish-Australian female footballer

== Places ==
- Koca Mustafa Pasha Mosque
