= Ottoman–Mamluk War (1485–1491) =

Conflict between the Ottoman Empire and the Mamluk Sultanate from 1485 to 1491

- Part of the Ottoman wars in the Near East
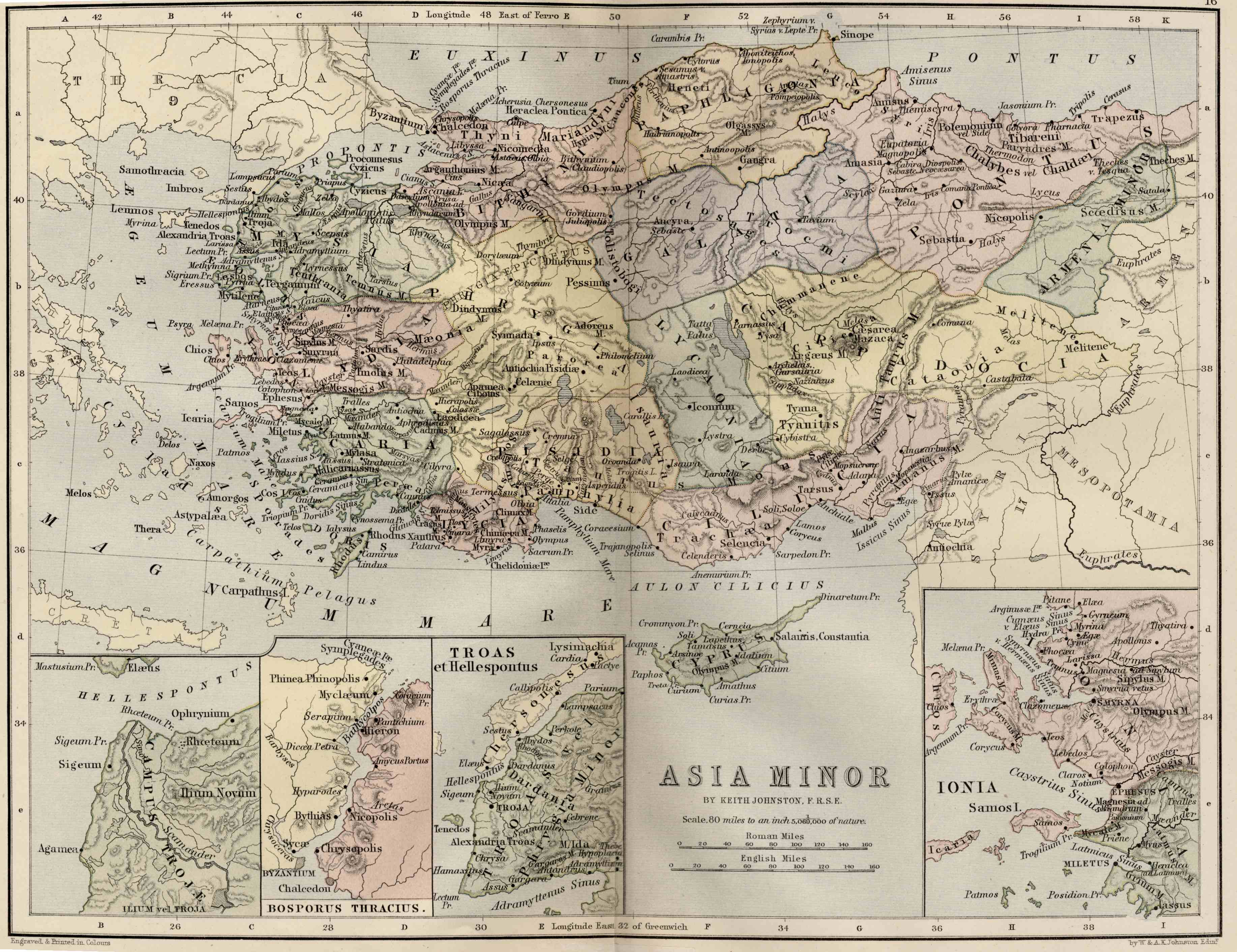
- Map of Asia Minor. Cilicia in light pink in southern Anatolia.
Date	1485–1491
Location	Anatolia, Syria
Result	Mamluk victory
Territorial changes	Status quo ante bellum

Belligerents
Ottoman Empire; Supported By: Dulkadirids: Pro-Ottoman faction (After 1488)	Mamluk Sultanate Supported By: Dulkadirids (After 1488): Pro-Mamluk faction; Ramadanid Emirate; Karamanids (Until 1487)

Commanders and leaders
Bayezid II Commanders: Yakup Bey †; Ferhad Beg †; Prince Şehinşah; Musa Beg †; Mustafa Beg †; Ali Beg; Ahmed Pasha (POW); Mustafa Pasha (POW); Kızıl Ahmed Beg (POW); Ahmed Beg (POW); Süleyman Agha (POW); Karagöz Mehmed Pasha (executed); Hızıroğlu Mehmed Pasha; Sinan Beg; Ahmed Beg; Hadim Ali Pasha (WIA); Turahanoğlu Ömer Bey; Yularkıstı Sinan Bey (POW); Ishak Pasha #; Karacapaşaoğlu Iskender Çelebi (POW); Kızılca Müslim Bey (POW); Mustanzaroglu Mahmud Bey; Arnavut Sinan Pasha †; Yakup Pasha; Evrenosoğlu Isa Bey †; Evrenosoğlu Suleiman Bey †; Evrenosoğlu Iskender Bey; Hussein Bey; Gedikoğlu Yahya Bey; Mihailoğlu İskender Bey (POW); Mihailoğlu Mustafa Pasha †; Beylerbeyi Mustafa Pasha; Oruç Bey †; Ala al-Dawla Bozkurt; Shah Budak (POW) Commanders: Shahqubad Feyyaz (WIA)	Qaitbay Commanders: Bish Beg; Uzbek min Tutuh; Kajmas al-Ishaki; Uzdamur al-Sayfi; Doğan al-Safi (surrendered); Amir Qansuh; Sibay b. Buhtuca (POW); Emir Temruz al-Shamsi; Emir Uzdamur; Kansukh al-Yahyawi; Khalil ibn Ismail; Shayh Jabal Nabulus; Barsbay Kara †; Tagribirdi Tatar †; Amir Sibay min Kanibay al-Tuyūrī al-Zahiri †; Al-Ashraf Qansuh al-Ghawri; Ömer Beg (POW); Gıyâseddîn Halil Bey Commanders: Özeroğlu Mekki Beg; Gündüzoğlu Mehmed Beg †; Turgutoğlu Mahmud Beg Ala al-Dawla Bozkurt Commanders: Shahruh ibn Bozkurt (POW)

Casualties and losses
120,000–180,000	30,000

The Ottoman–Mamluk War of 1485–1491 took place when the Ottoman Sultanate invaded the Mamluk Sultanate's territories of Anatolia and Syria. This war was an essential event in the Ottoman struggle for the domination of the Middle-East. After multiple encounters, the war ended in a Mamluk victory and a peace treaty was signed in 1491, restoring the status quo ante bellum. It lasted until the Ottomans and the Mamluks again went to war in 1516–17; in that war the Ottomans defeated and conquered the Mamluks.

== Background ==
Despite being two Sunni Muslim states, the relationship between the Ottomans and the Mamluks was adversarial: both states vied for control of the spice trade, and the Ottomans aspired to eventually take control of the Holy Cities of Islam. The two states however were separated by a buffer zone occupied by Turkmen states such as Karamanids, Aq Qoyunlu, Ramadanids, and Dulkadirids, which regularly switched their allegiance from one power to the other. Nevertheless, both the Venetian historian Domenico Malipiero and the Ottoman chronicler Tursun Bey report that as early as 1468, Mehmed II planned to campaign against the Mamluks in Syria, which was only averted by the refusal of Uzun Hassan and Karamanids to cooperate, leading to the invasion and eventual annexation of the Karaman Beylik by Mehmed.

When Bayezid II ascended the Ottoman throne in 1481, his brother Cem Sultan, who enjoyed great support in Anatolia, rose up and contended with him for the throne. After he was defeated in battle, he sought refuge first in the Ramadanids, and from there passed into Mamluk domains. Although the Mamluks declined to offer him any military support, this act aroused the hostility of Bayezid, which was further fanned when the Mamluks seized an Ottoman ambassador who was returning from Deccan with an Indian ambassador and gifts for the Ottoman Sultan.

== Operations ==
The conflict began when Bozkurt of Dulkadir (also called Alaüddevle), ruler of Dulkadirids, attacked the Mamluk city of Malatya, with the support of Bayezid. The Mamluks fought back and although they lost the first battle, they would eventually defeat Alaüddevle and his Ottoman allies.

=== 1485 Ottoman offensive ===
Bayezid launched a land and sea attack on the Mamluks in 1485. Led by the new governor of Karaman, Karagöz Mehmed Pasha, the Ottoman forces, largely drawn from provincial troops, subdued the rebellious Turgudlu and Vasak tribes and captured many fortresses in Cilicia. Peyser Mehmed's army was defeated by the Mamluks in battle outside Adana on 9 February 1486. Reinforcements from Istanbul, including Janissaries, were dispatched by Bayezid under his own son-in-law Hersekzade Ahmed Pasha, but the combined Ottoman army was again defeated before Adana on 15 March. Karagöz Mehmed fled the field, while Hersekzade Ahmed was taken captive, and Cilicia returned to Mamluk control.

=== 1487 Ottoman offensive ===
In 1487, the Ottomans again sent a major army consisting of a great number of regular army units and Janissaries, supported by the fleet and the forces of Dulkadir, and led by the Grand Vizier Koca Davud Pasha. Davud Pasha however avoided operations against the Mamluks, instead focusing his troops in suppressing revolts by the Turgudlu and Vasak tribes, securing his rear.

=== 1488 Ottoman offensive ===
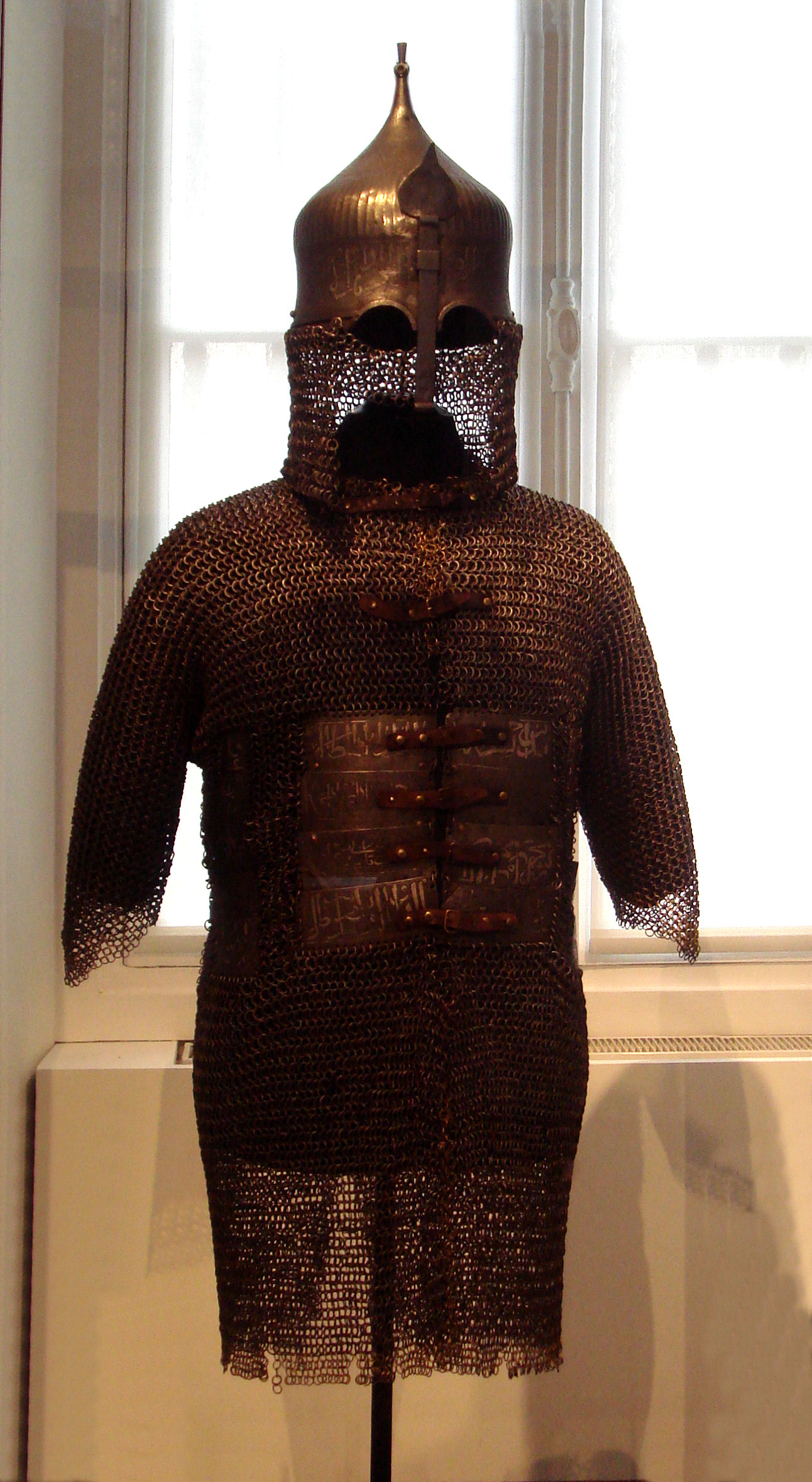
Ottoman armour (1480-1500), Musée de l'Armée.

In 1488, the Ottomans launched a major attack, from both land and sea: the navy was led by Hersekzade Ahmed Pasha, released from captivity, and the army by the governor of Rumeli, Hadim Ali Pasha. On this occasion, the Ottomans requested of the Venetians the use of Famagusta harbour to supply their troops by sea, but the Venetians rejected the request and even dispatched a fleet to Cyprus to guard against an Ottoman landing. The Mamluks also sought naval assistance from Italian powers, but were turned down as well. The Ottoman fleet then moved to Alexandretta, hoping to intercept the Mamluk forces as they came up from Syria, while the Ottoman army, numbering some 60,000 men, secured control of Cilicia. Another great storm however destroyed the fleet, and the Mamluks were able to advance into Cilicia. The two armies met at Ağaçarıyı near Adana on 26 August 1488. Initially, the Ottomans made good progress on their left, but their own right flank was driven back. When the Karaman soldiers fled the battlefield, the Ottomans were forced to retreat, conceding the field and the victory to the Mamluks.

The Ottoman army withdrew to Karaman to regroup, suffering more casualties to attacks by the Turkmen tribes. Most of its provincial commanders were recalled to Constantinople and imprisoned in the Rumeli Hisar. In the meantime, the Mamluks laid siege to Adana, which fell after three months. Hersekzade Ahmed Pasha was able to achieve a minor victory in destroying a Mamluk detachment, but Cilicia was securely in Mamluk hands. More importantly, the Ottomans' Turkmen allies began to turn to the Mamluks, including Alaüddevle, thus restoring a line of Mamluk-oriented buffer states along the border.

=== 1490 Mamluk offensive ===
In 1490, the Mamluks would again return to the offensive, advancing into Karaman and laying siege to Kayseri. As soon as Hersekzade Ahmed Pasha marched against them with a relief army however, they raised the siege and returned to Cilicia. By this time the Mamluks were weary of the war and its heavy financial burden, while the Ottomans grew concerned over a possible Crusade directed against them. Thus both powers were eager to settle the inconclusive conflict. A treaty was signed which fixed their mutual border at the Gülek Pass in the Taurus Mountains, leaving the Cilician plain to the Mamluks.

=== Analysis ===
The Ottomans were able to prevail on the Mamluks at sea, but on land the Mamluks successfully resisted the Ottomans, thanks to their string of fortresses in Anatolia and Syria, and the buffer principalities of Beylik of Dulkadir, led by Bozkurt of Dulkadir centered on Elbistan and Maras. The Ottomans were a stronger military power, but were weakened by internal dissensions and the lack of a strong centralized leadership by the Sultan Bayezid, who remained in Constantinople.

Throughout the conflict, the Mamluk army was characterized by the usage of brilliant nomadic cavalry in addition to a conventional army, whereas the Ottomans relied on a conventional army only, with light cavalry combining with infantry units.

=== Impact on Spain and the Nasrids ===
The Nasrid Dynasty of Granada sought Ottoman assistance against the Spanish, but Sultan Bayezid could only send limited support due to his involvement in the Ottoman-Mamluk conflict. Nasrid–Ottoman relations were established, and a fleet under Kemal Reis was nevertheless dispatched to the coasts of Spain. Ottoman support ended up being insufficient, in part leading to the Fall of Granada in 1492.

== Aftermath ==
With famine and plague spreading, a peace treaty was eventually sealed in May 1491, with the Mamluks remaining a powerful entity against the Ottomans, although they were financially exhausted. The boundaries between the two powers remained essentially unchanged.

The opposition between the Ottomans and the Mamluks remained in stalemate during the beginning of the 16th century, until Mamluk power was dramatically challenged by the incursion of the Portuguese in the Indian Ocean from 1505, thereby threatening Mamluk traditional trade routes and a major source of revenue, and leading to the catastrophic Portuguese-Mamluk War. The Ottoman Empire would ultimately take over the Mamluk Sultanate in 1517, following the Ottoman–Mamluk War of 1516–1517.

== Sources ==
- Brummett, Palmira Johnson (1993). Ottoman Seapower and Levantine Diplomacy in the Age of Discovery. SUNY series in the Social and Economic History of the Middle East. Albany, NY: State University of New York Press. ISBN 978-0-7914-1702-7. LCCN 92-44704. OCLC 613499540.
- Chase, Kenneth Warren (2003). Firearms: A Global History to 1700. Cambridge; New York: Cambridge University Press. ISBN 978-0-521-82274-9. LCCN 2002041026. OCLC 51022846.
- Finkel, Caroline (2006). Osman's Dream: The Story of the Ottoman Empire 1300–1923. London: John Murray. ISBN 978-0-7195-6112-2. LCCN 2008297857. OCLC 65203332.
- Har-El, Shai (1995). Struggle for Domination in the Middle East: The Ottoman-Mamluk War, 1485–1491. The Ottoman Empire and its Heritage. Vol. 4. Leiden; New York: E. J. Brill. ISBN 978-90-04-10180-7. ISSN 1380-6076. LCCN 94-40784. OCLC 31434541.
- Shaw, Stanford J. (1976). History of the Ottoman Empire and modern Turkey: Empire of the Gazis: The Rise and Decline of the Ottoman Empire 1280–1808. Vol. 1. Cambridge: Cambridge University Press. ISBN 978-0-521-29163-7. OCLC 725935950.
- Uyar, Mesut; Erickson, Edward J. (2009). A Military History of the Ottomans: From Osman to Atatürk. Santa Barbara, CA: ABC-CLIO. ISBN 978-0-275-98876-0. LCCN 2009020872. OCLC 435778574.
