= Hadım Ali Pasha =

Grand Vizier of the Ottoman Empire (1501–1503, 1506–1511)

Grand Vizier of the Ottoman Empire
- In office 1506–1511
- Monarch: Bayezid II
- Preceded by: Hersekzade Ahmed Pasha
- Succeeded by: Hersekzade Ahmed Pasha
- In office 1501–1503
- Monarch: Bayezid II
- Preceded by: Mesih Pasha
- Succeeded by: Hersekzade Ahmed Pasha

Personal details
- Born: Drozgometva, Bosnia
- Died: July 1511 Çubukova, between Kayseri and Sivas, Ottoman Empire
- Parent: Radošin, son of Vučihna, son of Ostoja (father)

Military service
- Battles/wars: Şahkulu Rebellion †

Hadım Ali Pasha (Turkish: Hadım Ali Paşa; died July 1511), also known as Atik Ali Pasha (Turkish: Atik Ali Paşa), was an Ottoman statesman and eunuch (hadım means "eunuch" in Turkish) of Ottoman Bosnian origin. He served as governor of Rumeli, and led the Ottoman army in the Ottoman–Mamluk War of 1485–1491, but was defeated at Adana in 1488. He was then named grand vizier from 1501 to 1503, and again from 1509 to 1511. During his latter tenure, he led the suppression of the Alevi-led Şahkulu Rebellion, but died in battle near Sivas along with the rebel leader Şahkulu himself.

== Life ==
He was from Drozgometva village in what is now Bosnia and Herzegovina.

He served as governor of Rumeli, and led the Ottoman army in the Ottoman–Mamluk War of 1485–1491, but was defeated at Adana in 1488. He was then appointed grand vizier in 1501–1503, and again in 1509–1511. During his latter tenure he led the suppression of the Alevi-led Şahkulu Rebellion. Near Sivas he fell in battle, in which the rebel leader Shahkulu was also killed in July 1511.

== Legacy ==
He had two eponymous mosques built in the Fatih district of Istanbul, one being the Gazi Atik Ali Pasha Mosque (completed 1497) in the Çemberlitaş neighborhood and the other being the Vasat Atik Ali Pasha Mosque (completed 1512) in the Karagümrük neighborhood.

== See also ==
- List of Ottoman grand viziers

Political offices
Preceded by Mesih Pasha	Grand Vizier of the Ottoman Empire; 1501–1503	Succeeded by Hersekzade Ahmed Pasha
Preceded by Hersekzade Ahmed Pasha	Grand Vizier of the Ottoman Empire; 1506–1511	Succeeded by Hersekzade Ahmed Pasha
