= Karaman Eyalet =

Administrative division of the Ottoman Empire from 1483 to 1864

ایالت قره‌مان Eyālet-i Ḳaraman
- Eyalet of the Ottoman Empire
- 1483–1864
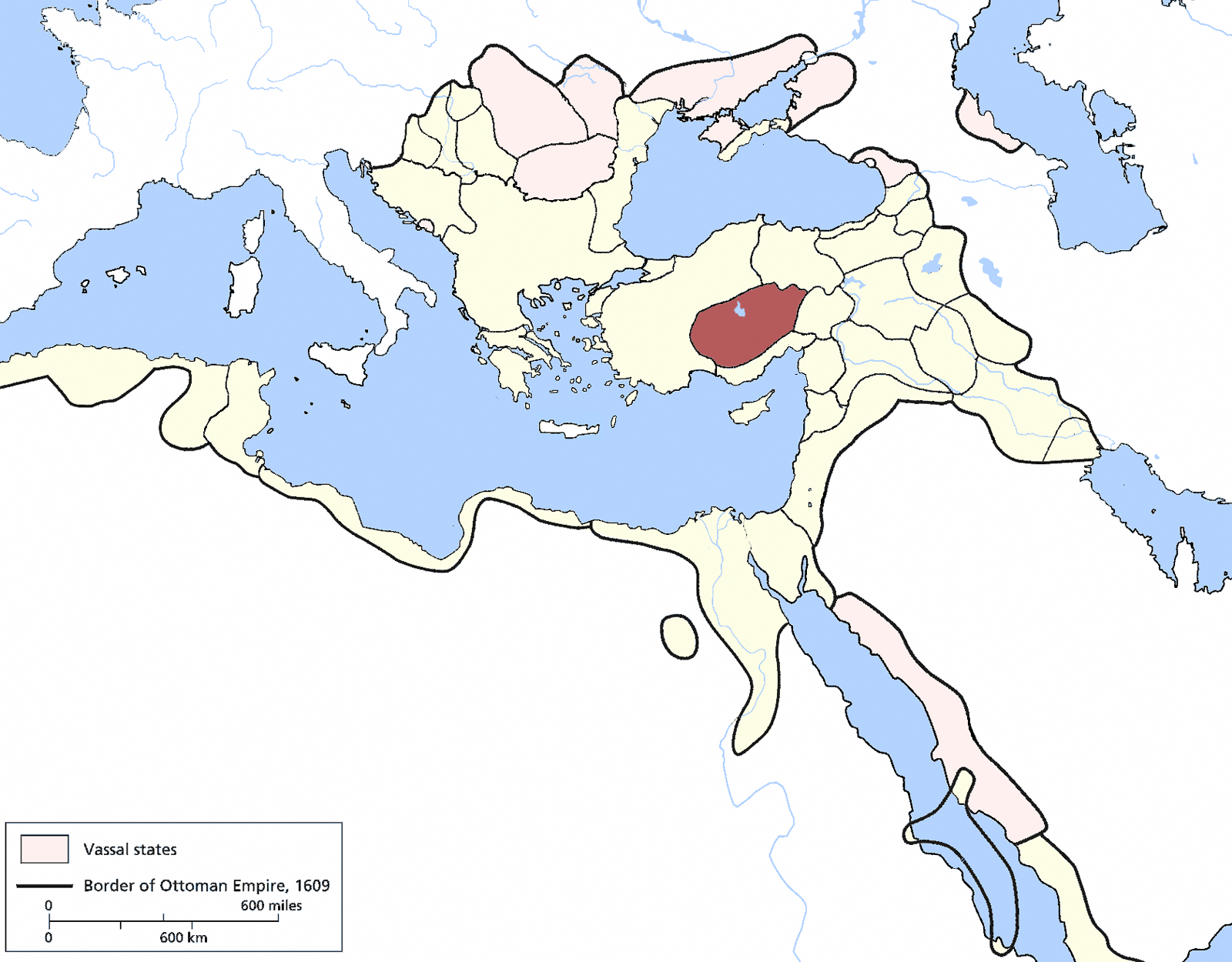
- The Karaman Eyalet in 1609
- Capital: Konya (1483–1522), (1562–1864), Kayseri (1522–1562)
- History
  - Established: 1483
  - Disestablished: 1864
Preceded by	Succeeded by
Karamanids	Konya Vilayet
- Today part of: Turkey

Karaman Eyalet (Ottoman Turkish: ایالت قره‌مان, romanized: Eyālet-i Ḳaraman) was one of the subdivisions of the Ottoman Empire. Its reported area in the 19th century was 30,463 square miles (78,900 km^{2}).

In 1468, the formerly independent principality of Karaman was annexed by the Ottomans; Mehmed II appointed his son Mustafa as governor of the new eyalet, with his seat at Konya.

== Administrative divisions ==
The eyalet consisted of seven sanjaks between 1700 and 1740: Konya, Niğde, Kayseri, Kırşehir, Beyşehir, Aksaray, and Akşehir.

=== Eyalet History ===
The area covered by the Karaman Beylerbeylik in the 17th century was 78.518 ^{km2} . According to today's Republic of Turkey administrative structure, it covered 6 provinces. These are Konya, Aksaray, Niğde, Kayseri, Nevşehir and Kırşehir. In 1468, it had six sanjaks, namely Konya Pasha Sanjak, Beyşehir, Aksaray, İçil (except for 1845-1887 when Ermenek was the center, its center was Silifke), Niğde and Kayseri. Akşehir Sanjak was established in 1518. In 1527, Karaman province; It consisted of the sanjaks of Konya, Kayseri, İçil, Niğde, Beyşehri, Aksaray and Maraş. In 1554, Kırşehri, which was a district of Bozok Sanjak of the Rum Province, was made a sanjak and connected to here. In 1571, the province was divided into 7 sanjaks. These were Konya, Niğde, Kayseri, Aksaray, Akşehir, Beyşehri and Kırşehri. In the same year, İçil sanjak was attached to Cyprus Province'. In 1839, Kayseri sanjak was attached to Bozok Province, the center of which was Yozgat. With the Provincial Organization Regulation accepted in 1864, its name became Konya Province.

== See also ==
- Karaman Province
