= Hersekzade Ahmed Pasha =

Grand Vizier of the Ottoman Empire

Hersekzade / Hersekli ⋅ Damat Ahmed Pasha

Grand Vizier of the Ottoman Empire
- In office 1497–1498
- Monarch: Bayezid II
- Preceded by: Koca Davud Pasha
- Succeeded by: Çandarlı Ibrahim Pasha the Younger
- In office 1503–1506
- Monarch: Bayezid II
- Preceded by: Hadım Ali Pasha
- Succeeded by: Hadım Ali Pasha
- In office 1511–1511
- Monarch: Bayezid II
- Preceded by: Hadım Ali Pasha
- Succeeded by: Koca Mustafa Pasha
- In office 1512 – November 28, 1514
- Monarch: Selim I
- Preceded by: Koca Mustafa Pasha
- Succeeded by: Dukaginzade Ahmed Pasha
- In office 8 September 1515 – 26 April 1516
- Monarch: Selim I
- Preceded by: Dukaginzade Ahmed Pasha
- Succeeded by: Hadım Sinan Pasha

Personal details
- Born: Stjepan Hercegović; 1459 Novi, Kingdom of Bosnia
- Died: 21 July 1517 (aged 57–58) Kızılçöl, Dulkadir Eyalet, Ottoman Empire
- Spouse: Hundi Sultan (m. 1484; died 1511)
- Children: Sultanzade Musa Bey; Sultanzade Mustafa Bey; Kamerşah Sultan; Hümaşah Sultan; Aynışah Hanimsultan; Mahdümzade Hanimsultan
- Parent: Stjepan Vukčić Kosača (father)

Military service
- Allegiance: Ottoman Empire
- Branch/service: Ottoman Navy
- Rank: Kapudan Pasha (grand admiral)

Hersekzade or Hersekli Ahmed Pasha ("Ahmed Pasha, son of the Herzog"; Serbo-Croatian: Ahmed-paša Hercegović; Aхмед-паша Херцеговић; 1459 – 21 July 1517), born as Stjepan Hercegović, was an Ottoman Bosnian general and five-times grand vizier of the Ottoman Empire.

He was the youngest son of the Herceg Stjepan Vukčić. Between late 1473 and early 1474 he departed from Novi (today Herceg Novi) to Constantinople, where he adopted Islam along with the peculiar way of life of the Ottoman court, which made possible his advancement through the Ottoman government and military ranks, eventually occupying top offices of the Empire's government and military as a statesman and navy's grand admiral.

== Early life ==
Stjepan was born into the Kosača family in 1459. He was the third and youngest son of Herceg Stjepan Vukčić, at the time the most powerful Bosnian noblemen. Stjepan's half-siblings from his father's first marriage included Queen Katarina, wife of King Stjepan Tomaš, Vladislav Hercegović, and Vlatko Hercegović, their father's successor. Stjepan's family belonged to the Bosnian Church, but were "shaky Christians" like most of their countrymen. His half-sister, Catherine, converted to Roman Catholicism upon marriage and became pious follower of the church.

Stjepan himself left Novi and departed for Constantinople in early 1474, at the latest, where he adopted Islam and changed his name to Ahmed.

== Career ==
After settling in Constantinople at Bayezid II's court, he assumed various high offices, and after marrying Bayezid II's daughter, Hundi Sultan, he reached the very top of the empire's government and military in a 40-year long career. Hersekli Ahmed Pasha was a five-time Grand Vizier of the Ottoman Empire and Grand Admiral to the sultan, serving five times as Grand Vizier between 1497 and 1515. He died on 21 July 1517 of natural causes, toward the end of the reign of Selim I.

== Family ==
He married Hundi Sultan, a daughter of Sultan Bayezid II by his concubine Bülbül Hatun, in 1484. They had two sons and four daughters:

- Sultanzade Musa Bey
- Sultanzade Mustafa Bey
- Kamerşah Hanımsultan
- Hümaşah Hanımsultan
- Aynışah Hanimsultan
- Mahdümzade Hanimsultan

== See also ==
- List of grand dukes of Bosnia

Political offices
Preceded by Koca Davud Pasha	Grand Vizier of the Ottoman Empire; 1497–1498	Succeeded by Çandarlı Ibrahim Pasha
Preceded by Hadım Ali Pasha	Grand Vizier of the Ottoman Empire; 1503–1506	Succeeded by Hadım Ali Pasha
Preceded by Hadım Ali Pasha	Grand Vizier of the Ottoman Empire; 1511	Succeeded by Koca Mustafa Pasha
Preceded by Koca Mustafa Pasha	Grand Vizier of the Ottoman Empire; 1512 – November 28, 1514	Succeeded by Dukakinzade Ahmed Pasha
Preceded by Dukakinzade Ahmed Pasha	Grand Vizier of the Ottoman Empire; September 8, 1515 – April 26, 1516	Succeeded by Hadim Sinan Pasha
