= Ibrahim I of Ramadan =

Beg of Ramadan from 1354 to 1384

Ibrahim Beg

Beg of Ramadan
- Reign: c. 1354–1384
- Predecessor: Ramadan
- Successor: Ahmed
- Died: 1384; Sis, Mamluk Sultanate
- House: Ramadan
- Father: Ramadan
- Religion: Islam

Sarim al-Din Ibrahim I (died 1384) was Beg of Ramadan in south-central Anatolia from c. 1354 until his death. Following the death of his father Ramadan, Ibrahim came to Damascus to do homage to the Mamluk Sultan who acknowledged him as his father's successor. Soon after, Ibrahim allied himself with Ghars al-Din Khalil (r. 1353–1386), the ruler of the Dulkadirids, in an attempt to seize Sis. The Mamluk governor of Aleppo was assigned to suppress the rebellion but was defeated by other local lords. The Mamluks recognized Ibrahim's authority in 1381 and made him the na'ib (viceroy) of Adana two years later. Ibrahim later again attacked Sis but the local Mamluk na'ib had him captured and executed. His brother Ahmed succeeded him.

== Early life and background ==
Much of southern Anatolia was originally controlled by the Armenian Kingdom of Cilicia, which gradually began losing its domains to the Mamluk Sultanate, allied with local Turkmens, at the turn of the 14th century. During this time, two major Turkmen confederations emerged in the region, one near Lower Cilicia, named Uchok, led by the Ramadanid dynasty, and the neighboring confederation of Bozok near Marash and Elbistan, led by the Dulkadirid dynasty. The Mamluks appointed the Dulkadirid ruler Zayn al-Din Qaraja (r. 1337–1353) as the Emir of Turkmens in 1337.

The Armenian Kingdom of Cilicia prior to rise of the Ramadanids

Ibrahim's father was Ramadan Beg, a chieftain of the Yüregir tribe and the leader of Uchok. (Note: He was referred to as Ramadan al-Turkmani al-Ujoghi (رمضان التركمانى الاوجعى) by contemporary Arab historians.) Ramadan was granted the position Emir of Turkmens by the Mamluk Sultan when Qaraja was dismissed for joining a rebellion in 1352. Ramadan's son Ibrahim was the first well-documented Ramadanid ruler. In June 1354, probably after his father's death, Ibrahim was on a diplomatic mission at the Mamluk sultan's court in Damascus, where he presented his gift of a thousand horses to the sultan and was appointed as the Emir of Turkmens, the position Ramadan Beg previously held.

== Reign ==
Although the Mamluk sultan appointed Ibrahim as the leader of all Turkmens in Mamluk-controlled southern Anatolia, Ibrahim failed to maintain his authority over the neighboring Bozok tribal confederation led by the Dulkadirids. The Mamluk sultan was thus forced to recognize Qaraja's son Ghars al-Din Khalil (r. 1353–1386) as the legitimate Dulkadirid ruler.

In 1365, Khalil captured Harpoot from the Mamluks and refused to hand back the city. Emboldened by Khalil's triumph and the Mamluks' investment in internal struggles, Ibrahim joined an alliance with Khalil in his rebellion as he aimed to capture the city of Sis from the Mamluks. The Mamluk wali (governor) of Aleppo, Timurbay, received a large army under his command from Cairo in 1378–1379. Although a cortege of forty men, including Turkmen dignitaries, traveled to Ayas to plead allegiance to him with many gifts, Timurbay arrested and robbed them. However, Turkmens later defeated and captured him in the passage of Bab al-Malik, near Belen.

Suspicious of the local Turkmens' loyalty, the distinguished Mamluk emir Barquq sent Emir Yunus al-Nawruzi to Aleppo on 13 June 1381 to gather intel. When the plans of Ibrahim and other chieftains to attack Aleppo and Malatya surfaced, Yunus was trusted with the command of the Mamluk army, including Syrian Mamluk na'ibs (viceroys), and allied Turkmen and Arab tribesmen among its ranks. The Mamluk army vanquished the Dulkadirid, Ramadanid, and various other local forces on 6 July 1381 near Marash. Following the defeat, Ibrahim sought to reconcile with the Mamluks and relayed his apology to the governor of Sis, Toruntay, and the Mamluk sultan forgave Ibrahim. In 1381, Ibrahim's authority in the region was acknowledged by the Mamluks, and in 1383, he was appointed as the na'ib of Adana.

Ibrahim was later alleged to be involved in waylaying and robbing merchants and pilgrims in the region as well as having formed an alliance with the Karamanids in order to annex Sis. The Mamluk army led by emir Yalbugha started marching north on 27 December 1383 to subdue Ibrahim and other rebels in Cilicia. Having forced several local Turkmen groups into submission on the way, the main branch of the Mamluk forces arrived in Missis on 11 January. Ibrahim evacuated Adana upon the arrival of the Mamluks. He retreated to the Taurus Mountains and later approached Sis. Tashbogha, the na'ib of Sis, made an unexpected attack and captured Ibrahim's children and consort. This forced Ibrahim to take refuge among the Bayat tribe. However, Ibrahim was unable to escape from the Mamluks for long as he lacked any significant military force. Ibrahim, his brother Kara Mehmed, their mother, sons, and followers were caught in late January by the Mamluk forces of Tashbogha. Yalbugha set off for Sis on 12 February. The Mamluks executed the prisoners in Sis by cutting them in half. The Mamluk army struggled with poor weather and was ambushed by the Turkmens on its way back to Aleppo. Although the ruler of the Ramadanids were killed, the Mamluks failed to fully maintain their authority over the Uchok tribe. Ibrahim was survived by his other brother Ahmed, who succeeded him.

== Bibliography ==
- Bosworth, Clifford Edmund (1996). New Islamic Dynasties: A Chronological and Genealogical Manual. New York: Edinburgh University Press. ISBN 9780231107143. OCLC 35029627.
- Har-El, Shai (1995). Struggle for Domination in the Middle East: The Ottoman-Mamluk War, 1485-91. New York: E.J. Brill. ISBN 9789004101807. OCLC 624096003.
- Sümer, Faruk (2007). "Ramazanoğulları". TDV Encyclopedia of Islam, Vol. 34 (Osmanpazari – Resuldar) (in Turkish). Istanbul: Presidency of Religious Affairs, Centre for Islamic Studies. pp. 442–445. ISBN 978-975-389-456-2.
- Uzunçarşılı, İsmail Hakkı (1969). Anadolu Beylikleri Ve Akkoyunlu, Karakoyunlu Devletleri [Anatolian Beyliks and Aq Qoyunlu, Qara Qoyunlu States] (in Turkish). Ankara: Turkish Historical Society Press. ISBN 9751624576. OCLC 563553149.
- Yiğit, Fatma Akkuş (October 2018). "Ramazanoğulları Beyliği (1352-1608)". İslâm Tarihi ve Medeniyeti (in Turkish). Vol. 11. Istanbul: Siyer Yayınları. ISBN 9786052375495. OCLC 1402618461.
