= Mehmed of Dulkadir =

Beg of Dulkadir from 1399 to 1442

Mehmed Beg

Beg of Dulkadir
- Reign: 2 August 1399 – October 1442
- Predecessor: Sadaqa
- Successor: Suleiman
- Born: Before 1362
- Died: October 1442 (aged over 80)
- Consort: Khadija Khatun
- Issue: Suleiman; Rustam; Dulkadir; Davud; Feyyaz; Emine Hatun; Nefise Hatun
- House: Dulkadir
- Father: Ghars al-Din Khalil
- Religion: Islam

Nasir al-Din Mehmed Beg (Turkish: Nasireddin Mehmed Bey; before 1362 – October 1442) was the ruler of Dulkadir, a state in southern Anatolia, from 1399 until his death. After his father, Ghars al-Din Khalil (r. 1353–1386), died, Mehmed repudiated the reign of his uncle, Shaban Suli (r. 1386–1398) and clashed with him on several occasions, relying on the support of the Mamluk Sultanate that ruled Egypt and Syria. Following Suli's murder, his son, Sadaqa, rose to the throne. Mehmed succeeded in claiming power shortly after with the intervention of the Ottoman Sultan Bayezid I (r. 1389–1402). During the Ottoman Interregnum (1402–1413), Mehmed supported Bayezid's son Mehmed Chelebi, who became the new sultan. While Nasir al-Din Mehmed was involved in sporadic skirmishes with the Mamluks, he enjoyed peace with them towards the end of his reign, marrying his daughter to the Mamluk Sultan Jaqmaq (r. 1438–1453) and commissioning the construction of madrasas and other buildings in Mamluk-controlled regions, such as Jerusalem.

== Background and early life ==
Mehmed's grandfather, Zayn al-Din Qaraja, was one of the Turkmen lords, or begs, dwelling in southern Anatolia and northern Syria in the early fourteenth century who were granted the right to administer part of the region by the Mamluk Sultanate of Egypt and Syria. Qaraja eventually revolted and was executed by the Mamluks in December 1353. His sons and successors, Ghars al-Din Khalil (r. 1353–1386) and Shaban Suli (r. 1386–1398), similarly were in a continuous conflict with the Mamluks and would both be assassinated on the orders of the Mamluk Sultan Barquq (r. 1382–1389, 1390–1399). Mehmed was presumably born sometime before 1362. (Note: Mehmed died in 1442, when, according to historian Refet Yinanç, who cites several Mamluk sources, he was older than eighty.) Following the demise of Mehmed's father, Khalil, Mehmed rejected the authority of his uncle, Suli. Sponsored by Barquq, Mehmed defeated his ruling uncle with the aid of the Mamluk governor of Sis, forcing Suli to flee to Develi in the summer of 1389. Suli later joined the rebellion led by the Mamluk governors of Malatya and Aleppo, Mintash and Yalbugha al-Umari. In this struggle, Mehmed continued to support Barquq, and along with his uncle, Sarim al-Din Ibrahim, marched on the governor of Besni, Toman Timur, who was the brother of Mintash.

Upon the murder of Shaban Suli in 1398, his son Sadaqa inherited the throne and traveled to the Mamluk court in Cairo to receive the manshūr (diploma of investiture). When Sadaqa returned to Elbistan, the capital, Mehmed challenged his authority, starting a bloody fight between the two. Mehmed likely sought help from the Ottoman Sultan Bayezid I (r. 1389–1402), who had recently established control over the lands located to the north of the Dulkadirids and formerly under the sovereignty of Kadi Burhan al-Din (r. 1381–1398). Mehmed was installed by Bayezid on 2 August 1399, who forced Sadaqa out of Elbistan. Bayezid's involvement in the Dulkadirid succession marked the beginning of the Ottoman–Mamluk rivalry, during which Dulkadir formed a buffer region.

== Reign ==
While Mehmed had intermittent conflicts with the Mamluks, he maintained stable relations with the Ottomans. Contrary to his uncle, Suli, Mehmed was fiercely against Timur, a Turco-Mongol leader who was, at the time, conquering vast portions of West Asia. After besieging the Ottoman-ruled city of Sivas in inner Anatolia in 1400, Timur attempted to ransack Elbistan in response to an earlier robbery by the Turkmens, who escaped to the mountains when he arrived. During his return from the Syrian campaign in early 1401, Timur ordered an offensive on the transhumant Dulkadir nomads occupying a kishlak (winter pasture) near Tadmur in central Syria and caught up to 200 thousand sheep.

The Ottoman Sultan Bayezid faced a major loss and subsequent imprisonment by Timur at the Battle of Ankara in July 1402. Following the battle, the Ottoman realm was ravaged by the Ottoman Interregnum (1402–1413), a civil war among Bayezid's claimant sons, ignited by his capture by Timur and death in 1403. Mehmed supported Mehmed Chelebi, who had gained direct control of Rum Eyalet, which were formerly the lands under the sovereignty of Kadi Burhan al-Din and bordered the Dulkadirids. Mehmed established a firm relationship with Mehmed Chelebi by marrying his daughter Emine Hatun to him and having his son Suleiman fight against Mehmed Chelebi's rival sibling Musa Chelebi in the spring of 1413. After the defeat and death of Musa in July 1413, Mehmed Chelebi was enthroned as the new head of the Ottomans.

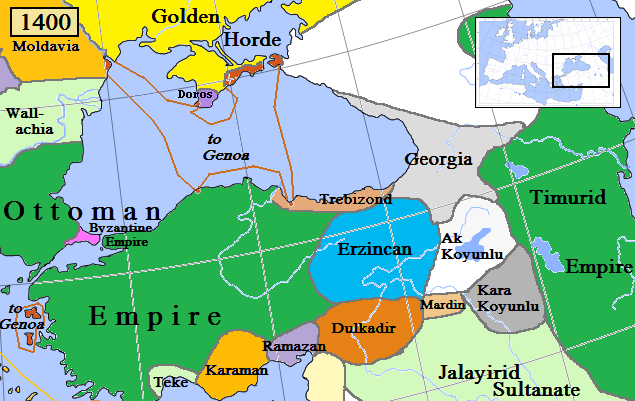
Dulkadir, c. 1400

An unexpected retreat by the Timurid forces in Syria resurrected the internal struggles within the Mamluks, such as the revolts of Tanriverdi and Demirtash, the former Mamluk governors of Aleppo and Damascus, respectively. Mehmed took advantage of the unrest by seizing control of Darende, while Malatya was captured by an allied chieftain, Muhammad bin Kopek. In November 1411, Mehmed was granted control of Aintab as a reward for his support of al-Mu'ayyad Shaykh (r. 1412–1421), who would triumph in claiming the Mamluk throne initially occupied by an-Nasir Faraj (r. 1399–1412). Mehmed's brother Ala al-Din Ali was previously made the city's governor by the Mamluks in July 1402 as an appreciation for his part in the restoration of an-Nasir Faraj's authority in Aleppo. However, Ali had lost control of Aintab before when Mehmed received the city, and in 1414 and the spring of 1417, al-Mu'ayyad Shaykh led two expeditions against the Dulkadirids, the first of which retook Aintab and Darende (which was lost after), and Ala al-Din Ali joined the latter campaign. The Mamluks then trusted Ali and Ali's son Hamza with the administration of Elbistan and Marash, respectively. This lasted a short period as Mehmed restored Dulkadirid rule in Elbistan, but afterwards, Mehmed sought more amicable relations with his relatives and the Mamluks. He appointed his brother Ali as the governor of Marash and participated in the Mamluk campaign against the Karamanids in 1419, which earned him the city of Kayseri in April the same year.

The locations of towns in Anatolia and Mesopotamia.

Through the orders of the Mamluk Sultan Barsbay (r. 1422–1438), Mehmed regained Aintab and Darende, which Ali had been reassigned as the governor of by the previous Mamluk ruler Sayf al-Din Tatar (r. 1421). Although Ali kept Marash, he would soon be executed by Barsbay in June 1426. His son Hamza briefly controlled Marash but would be succeeded by Mehmed's son Fayyaz. Barsbay additionally revoked the administration of Malatya held by Tughrak, Mehmed's cousin's son, and instead dispatched him to administer Homs in inner Syria.

In May 1429, Mehmed lost Harpoot in the east to the Aq Qoyunlu, who parried his and the Mamluk forces' attempt to capture Amid in May 1433. The Mamluks started favoring Ali's son Hamza and replaced Mehmed's son Fayyaz with the former as the ruler of Marash in December 1434, while imprisoning Fayyaz in Cairo. Mehmed shortly sent his wife Khadija Khatun there on a diplomatic mission that succeeded in allowing Fayyaz's return to his former position in Marash but also ensured the continuation of Suleiman's tenure in Kayseri, which Ibrahim II of Karaman was trying to obtain control of by negotiating with the Mamluks. This did not prevent Kayseri's fall to the joint attack conducted by the Karamanids, Ramadanids, as well as others that enacted direct Mamluk administration in July 1435. Parallel to the worsening relations with the Mamluks, Mehmed favored the Mamluk rebel, Janibeg al-Sufi, and arranged the marriage of his daughter, Nafisa Khatun, and Janibeg. Barsbay executed Hamza in October 1436 and initiated two campaigns against Janibeg and Mehmed, which, although futile, caused severe damage in Elbistan. By early 1437, Suleiman returned to governing Kayseri with the intervention of the Ottoman forces.

During the period between Barsbay's death in 1438 and that of Mehmed, Dulkadirid relations with the Mamluks took a positive turn. During the Aleppan Turkoman revolt of 1439 headed by rebel Taghribirmish, the Dulkadirids supported the Mamluk sultan Jaqmaq by providing military assistance. Their intervention helped suppress the uprising and restore Mamluk control in northern Syria. On 31 March 1440, widowed Nafisa Khatun married Jaqmaq. As part of the dowry, Mehmed was paid one million dinars. Moreover, Harpoot was back in Dulkadirid hands when the Mamluks ended the ten years of Aq Qoyunlu rule over the city. Mehmed died in October 1442, over eighty years of age. The throne was inherited by his son Suleiman Beg.

The locations of towns in Syria.

== Patronage ==
Mehmed built many madrasas (schools) in and outside his realm, including the Nasiriyya or Hatuniyya Madrasa in Kayseri and Ghadiriyya in Jerusalem north of the sacred al-Aqsa Mosque. Other examples of his architectural legacy were erected in Aintab, Marash, and outside of Aleppo.

The Ghadiriyya Madrasa was built around November–December 1432, and the construction was overseen by Mehmed's wife and "legally constituted agent" (wakīla) Misr Khatun, details on whose exact identity are unclear. On the way back to Elbistan from Cairo, Mehmed is known to have stopped in Jerusalem on 10 May 1440, where he inspected the madrasa and amended some changes in the documents of the endowment as he was the wāqif (donor). The monetary resources with which the building was constructed came from Mehmed's properties in Aleppo as well as two villages near Marash and Qal'at al-Rum. During the Ottoman rule of Jerusalem, the "titular overseers" of the madrasa continued to be members of the Dulkadir dynasty. During the years 1555–1556, the overseer was Ali Beg bin (the son of) Shah Rukh, who was the governor of Çemişgezek, and almost 20 years later, it was Shah Rukh bin Mehmed Khan. A conflict over the leadership of the madrasa surfaced in 1682, which indicated a condition laid by the founder of the madrasa, Mehmed, that the institution was limited to Turkish immigrants from Anatolia (al-Turk al-afāqiya min al-Arwām).

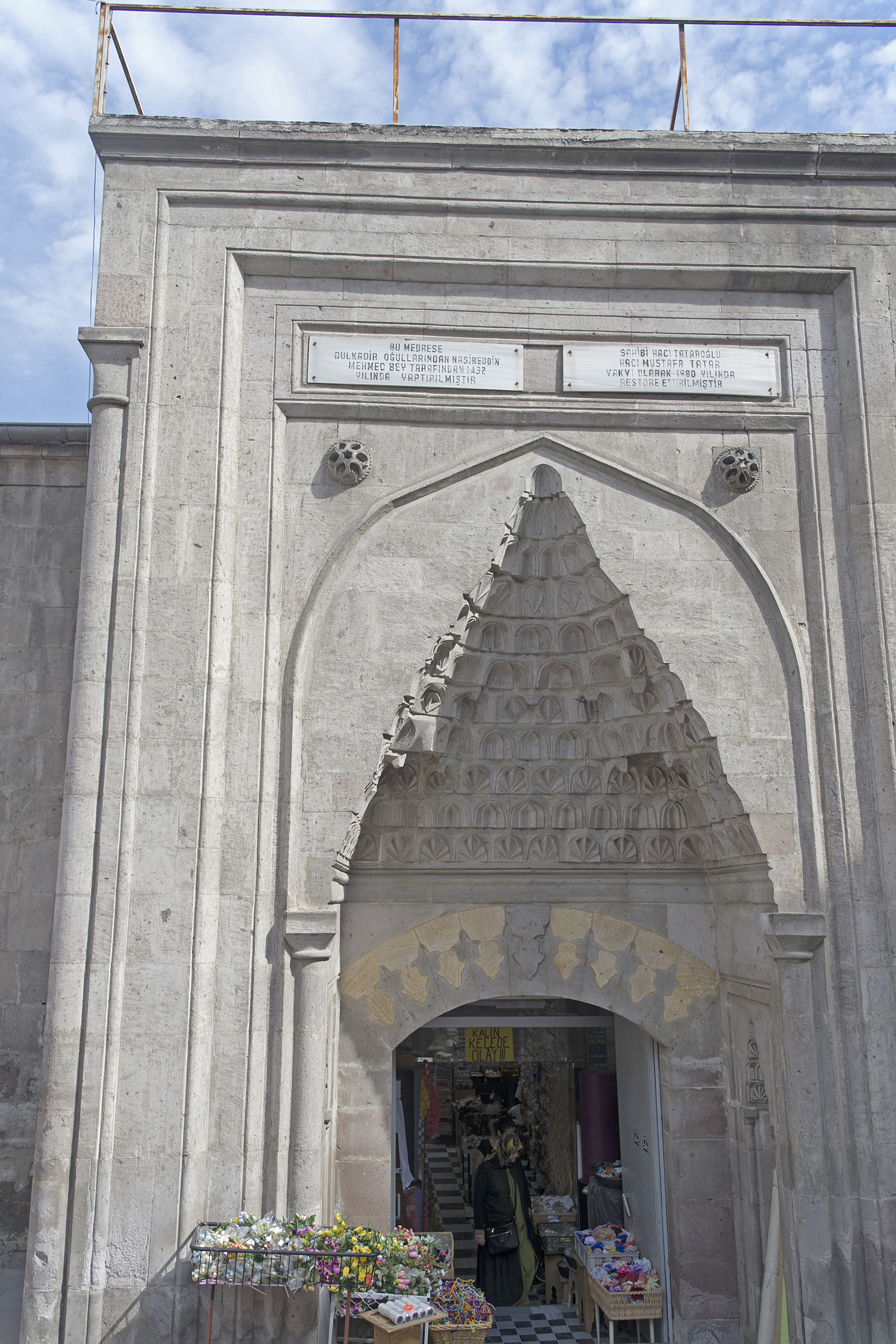
The entrance of Hatuniyya Madrasa, Kayseri in 2017.

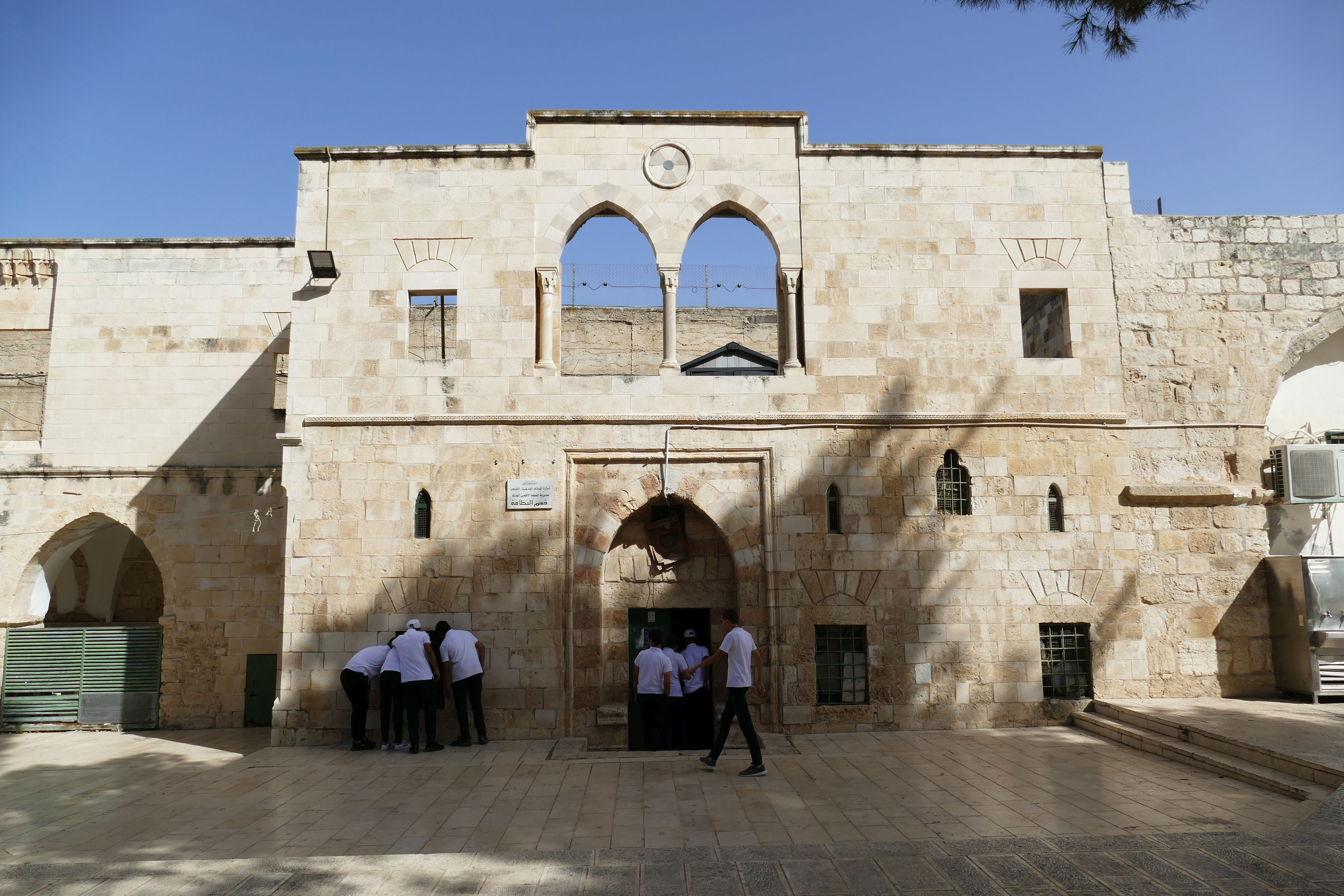
Ghadiriyya Madrasa in 2022.

== Family ==
Mehmed married with Kadi Burhan al-Din's daughter, Khadija Khatun, corresponding to his father's earlier alliance with Kadi Burhan al-Din. His sons included his successor Suleiman, Rustam, Dulkadir, Davud, Feyyaz, while his daughters were Emine and Nefise Hatun. Modern historian Refet Yinanç listed an additional daughter named Misr; however, Margaret Venzke laid doubt to this noting that a waqf (endowment) identified her as the son of Suleiman (therefore Mehmed's granddaughter). Nevertheless, Venzke suggested the possibility that there were two different women in the same family. The Jerusalemite historian Mujir al-Din, who was born 14 years after Mehmed's death, mentioned one Misr Khatun as Mehmed's wife, who oversaw the construction of the Ghadiriyya Madrasa of Jerusalem. Researcher Michael Hamilton Burgoyne explains that there is no evidence to the claim put forward by some historians, including Max van Berchem, that Misr Khatun was the same person as Mehmed's known wife, Khadija Khatun. Nevertheless, there is no other information about Misr Khatun.

Mehmed married his daughter Emine Hatun to the Ottoman Sultan Mehmed I and Nefise Khatun to the Mamluk Sultan Jaqmaq, after she was widowed from her earlier marriage with the Mamluk rebel Janibeg al-Sufi.

== Bibliography ==
- Banister, Mustafa (2026). "Engaging the 'Türkmen question' in Ibn ʿArabshāh's fifteenth-century sketch of east Anatolian relations with the Sultanate of Cairo (786–844/1385–1440)". Journal of the Royal Asiatic Society. Cambridge University Press. ISSN 1356-1863.
- Burgoyne, Michael Hamilton (1987). "Al-Ghādiriyya". Mamluk Jerusalem: An Architectural Study. Council for British Research in the Levant (CBRL), Al Tajir Trust. pp. 526–533. ISBN 9781739730291. JSTOR jj.2299528.71. OCLC 11830040.
- Muslu, Cihan Yüksel (25 July 2014). The Ottomans and the Mamluks: Imperial Diplomacy and Warfare in the Islamic World. I.B.Tauris. ISBN 9780857724762. OCLC 891619689.
- Venzke, Margaret L. (2000). "The Case of a Dulgadir-Mamluk Iqṭāʿ: A Re-Assessment of the Dulgadir Principality and Its Position within the Ottoman-Mamluk Rivalry". Journal of the Economic and Social History of the Orient. 43 (3): 399–474. ISSN 0022-4995. JSTOR 3632448.
- Venzke, Margaret L. (2017). "Dulkadir". In Fleet, Kate; Krämer, Gudrun; Matringe, Denis; Nawas, John; Rowson, Everett (eds.). Encyclopaedia of Islam (3rd ed.). Brill Online. ISSN 1873-9830.
- Yinanç, Refet (1989). Dulkadir Beyliği (in Turkish). Ankara: Turkish Historical Society Press. ISBN 9751601711. OCLC 21676736.
