= Hamza of Ramadan =

Beg of Ramadan from 1418 to 1426

Hamza

Beg of Ramadan
- Reign: 1418 – 1426
- Predecessor: Ibrahim II
- Successor: Mehmed I
- Died: 1426
- House: Ramadanid
- Father: Ibrahim I
- Religion: Islam

Izz al-Din Hamza (died 1426) was Beg of Ramadan from 1418 to 1426.

== Bibliography ==
- Bosworth, Clifford Edmund (1996). New Islamic Dynasties: A Chronological and Genealogical Manual. Edinburgh University Press. ISBN 9780231107143. OCLC 35029627.
- Har-El, Shai (1995). Struggle for Domination in the Middle East: The Ottoman-Mamluk War, 1485-91. E.J. Brill. ISBN 9004101802. OCLC 624096003.
- Sümer, Faruk (2007). "Ramazanoğulları". TDV Encyclopedia of Islam, Vol. 34 (Osmanpazari – Resuldar) (in Turkish). Istanbul: Presidency of Religious Affairs, Centre for Islamic Studies. pp. 442–445. ISBN 978-975-389-456-2.
- Uzunçarşılı, İsmail Hakkı (1969). Anadolu Beylikleri Ve Akkoyunlu, Karakoyunlu Devletleri [Anatolian Beyliks and Aq Qoyunlu, Qara Qoyunlu States] (in Turkish). Turkish Historical Society Press. ISBN 9751624576. OCLC 563553149.
