= Ala al-Din Ali =

Ala al-Din Ali may refer to:

- Ala al-Din Ali, also known as Zia al-Din Ali, last Sultan of the Ghurids
- Ala al-Din Ali of the Eretnids (died 1380), third Sultan of the Eretnids
- Ala al-Din Ali Dulkadir (died 1426), Dulkadirid prince
