= Tohma Canyon =

- Tohma Kanyonu
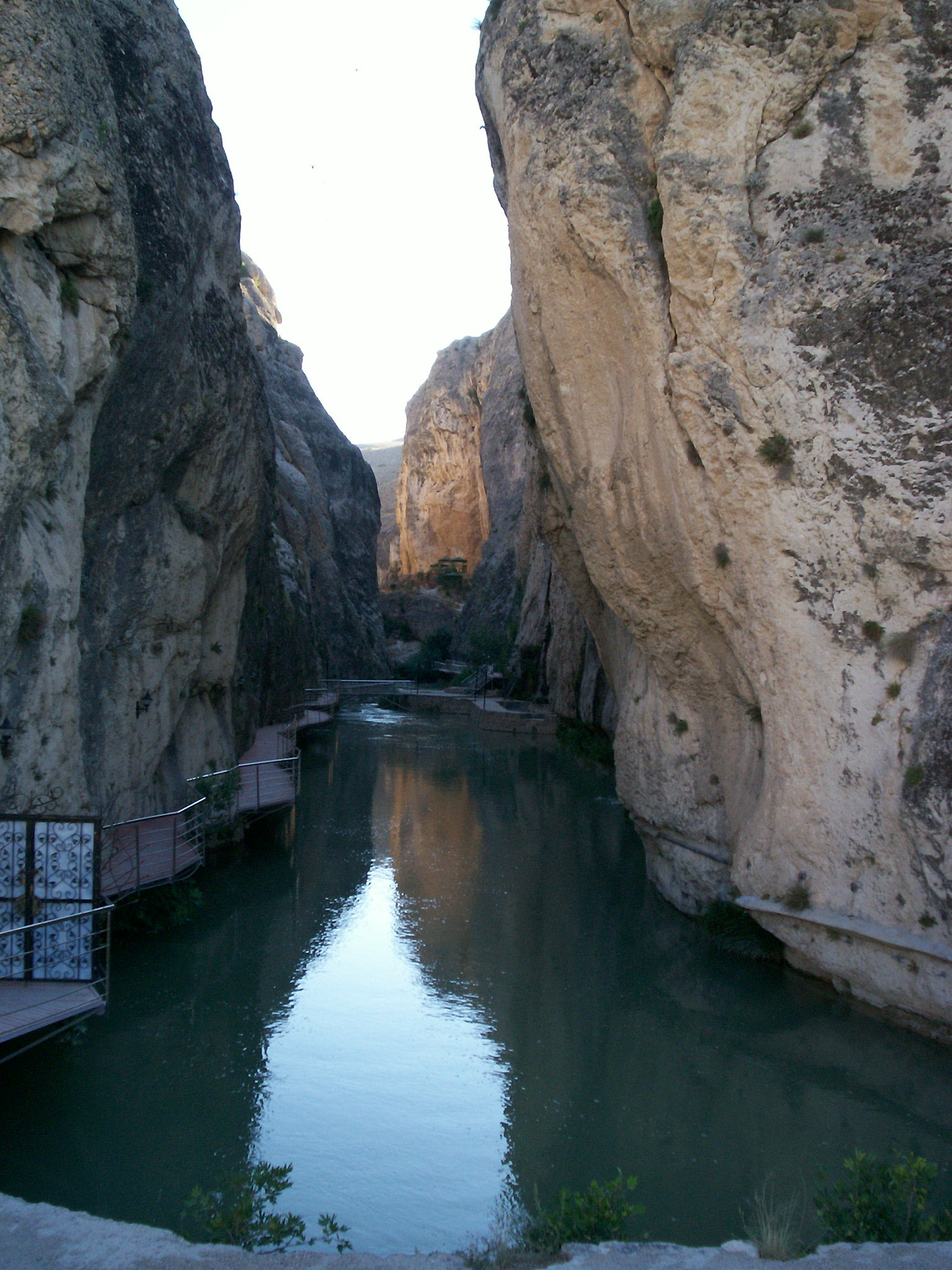
- Tojma Canyon and Tohma Creek

- Location within Turkey

Geography
- Location: Darende, Malatya Province, Turkey
- Coordinates: 38.56907°N 37.49311°E
- Rivers: Tohma Creek
- Interactive map of Tohma Canyon

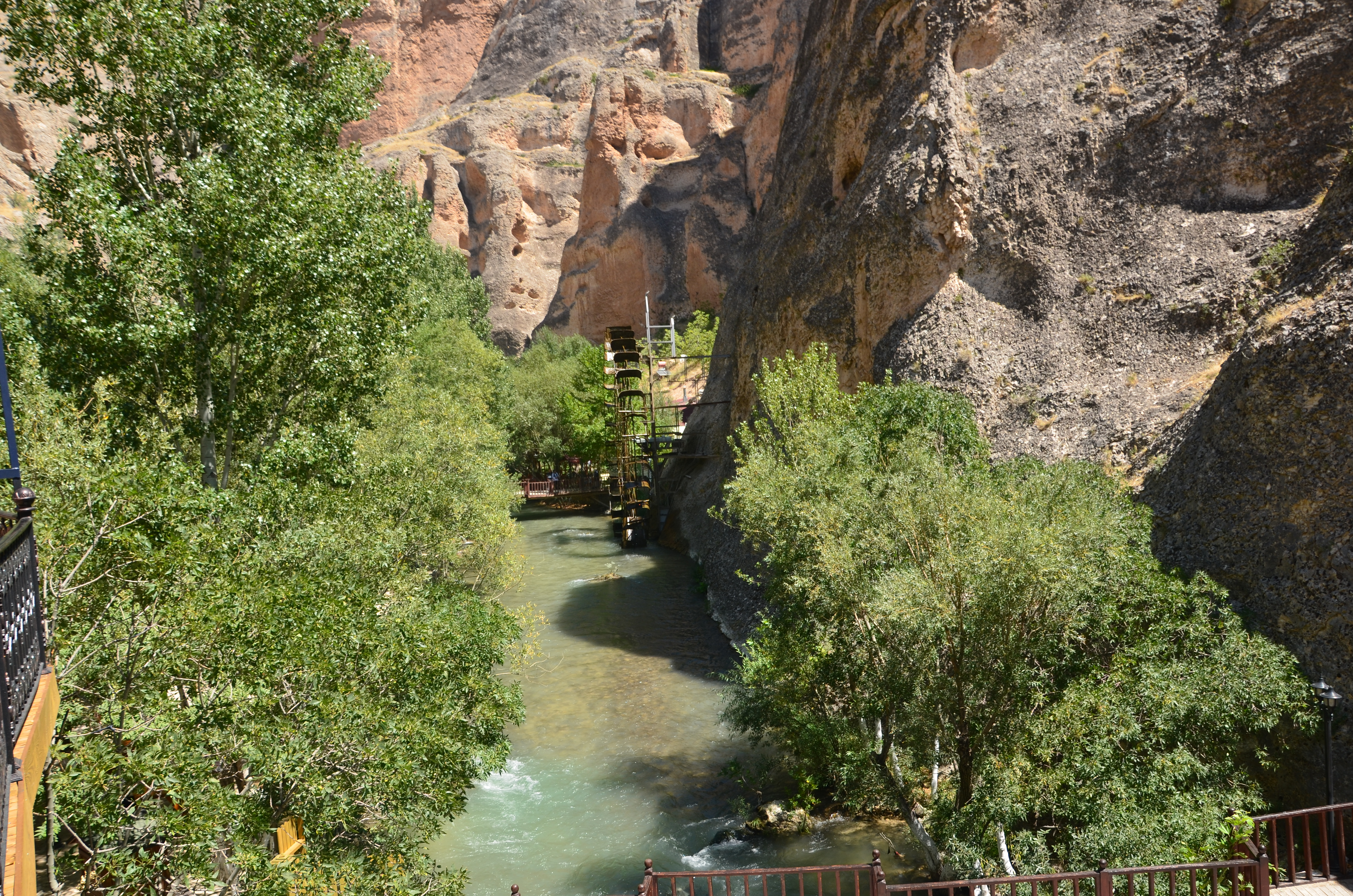
Tohma Canyon

Tohma Canyon (Turkish: Tohma Kanyonu) is a canyon at Darende district of Malatya Province in eastern Turkey.

Vegetation in the canyon consists of cypress, sycamore, willow and fig trees. Timber footbridges, small waterfalls, water wheels, trecking paths and tea gardens make the canyon a tourist attraction.
