= Karabayır, Darende =

Village in Turkey

Karabayır
- Neighbourhood
- Location in Turkey
- Coordinates: 38.440°N 37.667°E
- Country: Turkey
- Province: Malatya
- District: Darende
- Population (2025): 571
- Time zone: UTC+3 (TRT)

Karabayır is a neighbourhood in the municipality and district of Darende, Malatya Province in Turkey. It is populated by Kurds and had a population of 571 in 2025.
