= Ghars al-Din Khalil =

Beg of Dulkadir from 1353 to 1386

Khalil Beg

Beg of Dulkadir
- Reign: 1353–1386
- Coronation: 1355
- Predecessor: Zayn al-Din Qaraja
- Successor: Shaban Suli
- Died: April 1386; A yaylak between Marash and Aintab
- Burial: Zamantu
- Issue: Nasir al-Din Mehmed; Ala al-Din Ali; Hamza
- House: Dulkadir
- Father: Zayn al-Din Qaraja
- Religion: Islam

Ghars al-Din Khalil Beg (Turkish: Garseddin Halil Bey; died April 1386) was the second ruler of the Turkoman Dulkadirid principality, reigning from 1353 to 1386. Having actively taken part in military pursuits during his father Zayn al-Din Qaraja's rule, he further expanded the influence of the Dulkadirids and clashed with the Mamluk suzerainty, contributing to the growing tension between the Mamluks and Dulkadirids. Raids by Khalil in the northern frontier with the Mamluks prompted the Mamluk sultan to provoke dissension in the Dulkadir dynasty. The sultan incited Khalil's brother Sarim al-Din Ibrahim, who sought Mamluk recognition for his domains near Harpoot, to assassinate the ruler, Khalil. Ghars al-Din was killed in an ambush and was succeeded by his other brother Shaban Suli.

== Early life and background ==
Khalil was the son of Zayn al-Din Qaraja, a Turkoman chieftain who, after a series of clashes with other local Turkoman lords and Mamluk governors, was recognized by the Mamluk Sultan Al-Nasir Muhammad as the na'ib of the lands stretching from Marash to Elbistan in 1337. During Qaraja's rule, Khalil actively took part in his father's military campaigns. He captured Elbistan in the name of his father from the rival Turkoman lord Taraqlu Khalil bin Tarafi, in 1335 or 1337, which served as the capital until the fall of the Dulkadirids.

Pre-Dulkadirid southern Anatolia and northern Syria

Qaraja, who had rocky diplomatic relations with the Mamluks, eventually declared independence in 1348. As a result, the Mamluks sacked and occupied Elbistan, prompting Qaraja to escape to the mountains. In order to help his father gain some time, Khalil attacked the Mamluk army with 20 of his men but was captured. In 1353, Qaraja took refuge in the court of the Eretnid ruler Ghiyath al-Din Muhammad, but at the request of the Mamluks Qaraja was sent to Aleppo in chains on 22 September 1353, for which Muhammad was paid 500,000 dinars. One of Qaraja's sons attempted to rescue his father in an unsuccessful attack on Aleppo. This further angered the sultan, Sultan Salih, who demanded Qaraja's transfer to Cairo. There, Qaraja was berated by the sultan, imprisoned in the Citadel of Cairo for 48 days, and tortured to death on 11 December 1353. His corpse was left hanging in Bab Zuweila for 3 days.

== Rise to power ==
After Qaraja's death, Khalil was not recognized as the new ruler by the Mamluks. On 10 June 1354, Ramadan Beg of the Ramadanids visited Cairo with a gift of a thousand horses for the Mamluk sultan, wishing to be granted the right to rule Qaraja's lands. The Mamluks recognized Ramadan as the emir of the Turkomans. The Ramadanids, who led the Üçok tribal confederation in Çukurova, were unable to establish their authority over the neighboring Bozok tribal confederation, which was under the influence of the Dulkadirids and Khalil Beg. When it became clear that the Ramadanids could not consolidate their power and there was the possibility of a clash between the Dulkadirids and the Ramadanids, the Mamluks finally recognized Khalil as the new ruler of the Dulkadirids in 1355.

== Rule ==
During Khalil's rule, the Dulkadirids expanded their borders and frequently interacted with the Mamluks and Kadi Burhan al-Din, who had usurped the rule of the Eretnid Sultanate from Muhammad II Chelebi as his regent in Sivas in 1381. Khalil's domain included Marash, Zamantu, Darende, Tephrike, Melitene, Harpoot, Besni, Amid, and Amuq. Khalil's wish to become independent and increase his influence like his father exacerbated Mamluk-Dulkadirid relations.

In 1352 or 1353, prior to his recognition as ruler, Khalil sought to expand the Dulkadirid lands towards the Euphrates corridor and retaliate for what he considered his father's betrayal. This included an attempt to capture Malatya and the castle of Zamantu. The attack on Malatya was unsuccessful, since the natives secured Mamluk authority in 1360, but Khalil captured Zamantu and incorporated it as a core Dulkadirid territory. The fortress of Harpoot, initially controlled by the Eretnids, changed hands for several times, first surrendering to Khalil in 1364 but returning to the Mamluks in the winter of 1366. Khalil retook Harpoot in September 1378. This victory was followed by a joint Dulkadir-Ramadanid attack on the Mamluk emir Tīmūrbay of Aleppo near Ayas in February 1379 as well as a major Dulkadirid victory near Marash.

As a response to continuous Dulkadirid raids near Aleppo, the Mamluks captured Marash and advanced to Elbistan, which had been left defenseless. These major losses prompted Khalil to seek new alliances. Kadi Burhan al-Din was the Eretnid vizier who overthrew his ruler and took over Eretnid rule. Khalil began cooperating with Burhan al-Din and married his son and heir Mehmed to Burhan al-Din's daughter. With his support, Khalil plundered the Mamluk-controlled towns of Darende and Divriği, also recapturing Elbistan and Marash in 1384 although control of Elbistan and Marash did not last. Barquq, the new Mamluk sultan (r. 1382–1389, 1390–1399), made an effort to thwart Dulkadirid ambitions by provoking conflict between Khalil's brothers and secure Khalil's assassination.

== Assassination ==
The Mamluks commissioned Khalil's brother, Sarim al-Din Ibrahim, to kill Khalil. Ibrahim had earlier traveled to Cairo to seek recognition from the Mamluks as the lord of Harpoot. From Aleppo, Ibrahim deployed his troops to the yaylak between Marash and Aintab, where Khalil was residing and ambushed him in April 1386. Khalil's severed head was sent to Cairo, while his body was buried in the turbe of Malik Ghazi located below the Zamantu Castle. Khalil was aged over sixty when he died.

== Family ==
Khalil had 2 or 3 sons: Mehmed, Ali, and Hamza (who might have been Ali's son instead). Ali became the governor of Elbistan, while Mehmed was the fifth ruler of the principality. During their father's reign, Mehmed and Ali received land around Aleppo from Barquq, although it is unknown whether this was just an honorary rank or if some service was required.

== Bibliography ==
- Alıç, Samet (2020). "The Dulkadir's Emirs Killed by the Mamluks". The Journal of Selcuk University Social Sciences Institute (in Turkish) (43): 83–94.
- Har-El, Shai (1995). Struggle for Domination in the Middle East: The Ottoman-Mamluk War, 1485-91. E.J. Brill. ISBN 9004101802.
- Kaya, Abdullah (2014). "Dulkadirli Beyliği'nin Eratnalılar ile Münasebetleri". Mustafa Kemal University Journal of Graduate School of Social Sciences (in Turkish). 11 (25): 81–97.
- Merçil, Erdoğan (1991). Müslüman-Türk devletleri tarihi (in Turkish). Turkish Historical Society Press.
- Mordtmann, Johannes Heinrich & Ménage, Victor Louis (2012). "Ḏh̲u 'l-Ḳadr". Encyclopaedia of Islam New Edition Online. Leiden: E. J. Brill.
- Özaydın, Abdülkerim (2001). "Kadı Burhâneddin". TDV Encyclopedia of Islam, Vol. 24 (Kāânî-i Şîrâzî – Kastamonu) (in Turkish). Istanbul: Presidency of Religious Affairs, Centre for Islamic Studies. pp. 74–75. ISBN 978-975-389-451-7.
- Sinclair, Thomas Alan (1987). Eastern Turkey An Architectural and Archaeological Survey. Vol. II. Pindar Press.
- Venzke, Margaret L. (2000). "The Case of a Dulgadir-Mamluk Iqṭāʿ: A Re-Assessment of the Dulgadir Principality and Its Position within the Ottoman-Mamluk Rivalry". Journal of the Economic and Social History of the Orient. 43 (3): 399–474. doi:10.1163/156852000511349. JSTOR 3632448.
- Venzke, Margaret L. (2017). "Dulkadir". In Fleet, Kate; Krämer, Gudrun; Matringe, Denis; Nawas, John; Rowson, Everett (eds.). Encyclopaedia of Islam (3rd ed.). Brill Online. ISSN 1873-9830.
- von Zambaur, Eduard Karl Max (1927). Manuel de généalogie et de chronologie pour l'histoire de l'Islam avec 20 tableaux généalogiques hors texte et 5 cartes (in French). H. Lafaire.
- Yinanç, Refet (1988). Dulkadir Beyliği (in Turkish). Ankara: Turkish Historical Society Press.
