= Sadaqa of Dulkadir =

Beg of Dulkadir from 1398 to 1399

Sadaqa Beg

Beg of Dulkadir
- Reign: 1398–2 August 1399
- Predecessor: Shaban Suli
- Successor: Nasir al-Din Mehmed
- House: Dulkadir
- Father: Shaban Suli
- Religion: Islam

Sadaqa Beg (Turkish: Sadaka Bey) was the fourth ruler of the Turkoman Dulkadirid principality, ruling from 1398 to 1399. He rose to the throne after his father Suli Beg was assassinated and the Mamluks issued him the manshūr, the diploma to rule. However, Sadaqa was quickly deposed and forced out of Elbistan by the Ottoman Sultan Bayezid I, who allowed Sadaqa's rival cousin Mehmed to be the new ruler.

== Bibliography ==
- Venzke, Margaret L. (2017). "Dulkadir". In Fleet, Kate; Krämer, Gudrun; Matringe, Denis; Nawas, John; Rowson, Everett (eds.). Encyclopaedia of Islam (3rd ed.). Brill Online. ISSN 1873-9830.
- Venzke, Margaret L. (2000). "The Case of a Dulgadir-Mamluk Iqṭāʿ: A Re-Assessment of the Dulgadir Principality and Its Position within the Ottoman-Mamluk Rivalry". Journal of the Economic and Social History of the Orient. 43 (3): 399–474.
