= Hisarcık, Darende =

Village in Turkey

Hisarcık
- Neighbourhood
- Location in Turkey
- Coordinates: 38.479°N 37.652°E
- Country: Turkey
- Province: Malatya
- District: Darende
- Population (2025): 181
- Time zone: UTC+3 (TRT)

Hisarcık is a neighbourhood in the municipality and district of Darende, Malatya Province in Turkey. It is populated by Kurds and had a population of 181 in 2025.
