= Ibrahim II of Ramadan =

Beg of Ramadan from 1417 to 1418

Ibrahim II

Beg of Ramadan
- Reign: Late 1417 – 1418
- Predecessor: Ahmed
- Successor: Hamza
- Died: January 1427; Cairo, Mamluk Sultanate
- House: Ramadanid
- Father: Ahmed
- Religion: Islam

Sarim al-Din Ibrahim II (died January 1427) was Beg of Ramadan from 1417 to 1418.

== Bibliography ==
- Bosworth, Clifford Edmund (1996). New Islamic Dynasties: A Chronological and Genealogical Manual. Edinburgh University Press. ISBN 9780231107143. OCLC 35029627.
- Har-El, Shai (1995). Struggle for Domination in the Middle East: The Ottoman-Mamluk War, 1485-91. E.J. Brill. ISBN 9004101802. OCLC 624096003.
- Sümer, Faruk (2007). "Ramazanoğulları". TDV Encyclopedia of Islam, Vol. 34 (Osmanpazari – Resuldar) (in Turkish). Istanbul: Presidency of Religious Affairs, Centre for Islamic Studies. pp. 442–445. ISBN 978-975-389-456-2.
- Uzunçarşılı, İsmail Hakkı (1969). Anadolu Beylikleri Ve Akkoyunlu, Karakoyunlu Devletleri [Anatolian Beyliks and Aq Qoyunlu, Qara Qoyunlu States] (in Turkish). Turkish Historical Society Press. ISBN 9751624576. OCLC 563553149.
