= Balaban, Darende =

Village in Turkey

Balaban
- Neighbourhood
- Location in Turkey
- Coordinates: 38.467°N 37.585°E
- Country: Turkey
- Province: Malatya
- District: Darende
- Population (2025): 1,483
- Time zone: UTC+3 (TRT)

Balaban is a neighbourhood in the municipality and district of Darende, Malatya Province in Turkey. It is populated by Kurds and by Turks and had a population of 1,483 in 2025.
