= Ala al-Din Ali Dulkadir =

Dulkadirid prince (died 1426)

Ala al-Din Ali Beg (died June 1426) was a Dulkadirid prince who served the Mamluk Sultanate of Egypt and Syria.

During the reign of his father, Khalil (r. 1353–86), Ali received land around Aleppo from the Mamluk Sultan Barquq (r. 1382–89, 1390–99), although it is unknown whether this was just an honorary rank or if some service was required. The Mamluk Sultanate an-Nasir Faraj (r. 1399–1412) appointed Ali as the governor of Aintab in July 1402, which he later lost on an unknown date. The new sultan al-Mu'ayyad Shaykh (r. 1412–21) instead transferred the city's rule to Ali's brother Nasir al-Din Mehmed in November 1411, the leader of the Dulkadirids as an appreciation of Mehmed's support for his rise to power.

However, in the spring of 1417, al-Mu'ayyad Shaykh led two expeditions against the Dulkadirids, the first of which retook Aintab and Darende (which was lost after), and Ala al-Din Ali joined the latter campaign. The Mamluks then trusted Ali and Ali's son Hamza with the administration of Elbistan and Marash, respectively. This lasted a short period as Mehmed restored Dulkadirid rule in Elbistan. Afterwards, Mehmed sought more amicable relations with his relatives and the Mamluks, appointing Ali as the governor of Marash. Through the orders of the Mamluk Sultan Barsbay (r. 1422–38), Mehmed regained Aintab and Darende, which Ali had been reassigned as the governor of by the previous Mamluk ruler Sayf al-Din Tatar (r. 1421). Although Ali kept Marash, he was executed by Barsbay in June 1426. His son Hamza briefly controlled Marash but was succeeded by Mehmed's son Fayyaz.

== Bibliography ==
- Venzke, Margaret L. (2000). "The Case of a Dulgadir-Mamluk Iqṭāʿ: A Re-Assessment of the Dulgadir Principality and Its Position within the Ottoman-Mamluk Rivalry". Journal of the Economic and Social History of the Orient. 43 (3): 399–474. ISSN 0022-4995. JSTOR 3632448.
- Venzke, Margaret L. (2017). "Dulkadir". In Fleet, Kate; Krämer, Gudrun; Matringe, Denis; Nawas, John; Rowson, Everett (eds.). Encyclopaedia of Islam (3rd ed.). Brill Online. ISSN 1873-9830.
- Yinanç, Refet (1989). Dulkadir Beyliği (in Turkish). Ankara: Turkish Historical Society Press. ISBN 9751601711. OCLC 21676736.
