= Ayvalı, Darende =

Village in Turkey

Ayvalı
- Neighbourhood
- Location in Turkey
- Coordinates: 38.732°N 37.614°E
- Country: Turkey
- Province: Malatya
- District: Darende
- Population (2025): 1,761
- Time zone: UTC+3 (TRT)

Ayvalı is a neighbourhood in the municipality and district of Darende, Malatya Province in Turkey. It is populated by Kurds and by Turks and had a population of 1,761 in 2025.
