= Shaban Suli =

Beg of Dulkadir from 1386 to 1398

Suli Beg

Beg of Dulkadir
- Reign: 1386–1398
- Predecessor: Ghars al-Din Khalil
- Successor: Sadaqa
- Died: May 1398; A yaylak near Marash
- Issue: Sadaqa
- House: Dulkadir
- Father: Zayn al-Din Qaraja
- Religion: Islam

Shaban Suli Beg (Turkish: Şaban Süli Bey; died May 1398), also known as Sevli Beg, was the third ruler of Dulkadir from 1386 to 1398. Suli's father was Zayn al-Din Qaraja (r. 1337–1353), a Turkoman chieftain, who founded the state of Dulkadir in southern Anatolia and northern Syria as a client of the Mamluk Sultanate. Suli succeeded his older brother Ghars al-Din Khalil (r. 1353–1386), who was assassinated on the orders of the Mamluk Sultan Barquq (r. 1382–1389, 1390–1399). Suli was involved in a series of clashes with the Mamluks, in which he was initially victorious, forcing Barquq to recognize him as the new ruler. Barquq continued supporting Suli's rivals, and in 1389, Suli joined a rebellion against the state. He was pardoned in January 1391 but this time allied himself with Timur (r. 1370–1405), perpetrating an invasion of Syria. Suli faced a major loss at the hands of the Mamluks in March 1395 and was assassinated in May 1398 on the order of Barquq. The throne was inherited by his son, Sadaqa (r. 1398–1399).

== Early life and background ==
The region around Marash in southern Anatolia came under the dominion of the Mamluk Sultanate of Egypt in 1298. Suli's father and the leader of his tribe, Zayn al-Din Qaraja (r. 1337–1353), was one of the Muslim Turkoman lords, or begs, dwelling there. In 1337, the Mamluks granted him the right to administer the area around Marash and Elbistan, the capital. Qaraja ultimately revolted against the Mamluks but was caught and executed on 11 December 1353.

During the reign of Ghars al-Din Khalil (r. 1353–1386), Qaraja's son and Suli's brother, the Dulkadirids considerably expanded their borders. Khalil's wish to become independent and increase his influence like his father exacerbated Mamluk-Dulkadirid relations. Along with his brother, Suli took part in the defense against Mamluk forces near Marash in 1381. Suli had to relocate to Harpoot following a defeat there. He fell out with Khalil and fled to the court of the governor of Aleppo, similar to his other brothers, Ibrahim, Isa, and Osman, who took refuge in Cairo. The Mamluks quickly advanced to Elbistan, which was left defenseless. These major losses prompted Khalil to seek new alliances. Kadi Burhan al-Din (r. 1381–98) was a rising figure who usurped the Eretnid throne as the former vizier. With Burhan al-Din's support, Khalil plundered several Mamluk-controlled towns. In order to thwart Dulkadirid activity, the new Mamluk sultan, Barquq, took advantage of rivalries between Khalil's brothers and commissioned Khalil's brother, Sarim al-Din Ibrahim, to assassinate Khalil. Ibrahim ambushed and murdered his brother in April 1386.

== Reign ==
Suli rose to the throne after Khalil's death. The Mamluk Sultan Barquq (r. 1382–1389, 1390–1399) dispatched the Syrian Mamluk army towards Elbistan. However, a defeat at Göksun forced him to grant Suli the manshūr (diploma), recognizing him as a legitimate ruler. Despite that, Barquq's rivalry persisted such that he kept Suli's brother and claimant to the throne, Da'ud, in Cairo and bestowed upon him the title amīr ʿashara (lit. 'emir of ten'). He also released Ibrahim and Osman to initiate an internal conflict within the dynasty. In May 1387 near Marash, Suli defeated Ibrahim bin Yaghmur, a local lord supported by the Mamluks, on the battlefield. Barquq then sponsored Suli's nephew Nasir al-Din Mehmed, who forced Suli to flee to Develi with the aid of the Mamluk governor of Sis in the summer of 1389. That year, Suli joined the rebellion of the Mamluk governors of Malatya and Aleppo, Mintash and Yalbugha al-Umari, for an independent Syria. This rebellion would continue until 1393. In late September 1390, Suli and his brother Osman occupied the town of Aintab with a force of 10,000 troops, although they could not capture the fortress. Badr al-Din al-Ayni produced a firsthand description of the damage caused by the siege, during which al-Ayni and his brother hid in the citadel.

Suli sought a pardon for his disloyalty to the Mamluks in January 1391, and Barquq recognized Suli once again. Conversely, Suli attempted to provoke Timur (r. 1370–1405) into invading Syria, which ignited another war with the Mamluk authorities, who overpowered Suli in March 1395. Suli had barely avoided getting caught in this struggle, after which he stopped raiding Syria. Meanwhile, he allowed the Turkmens under his rule to ransack Kadi Burhan al-Din's lands to the north such that Burhan al-Din had to construct two fortresses on his sou+thern borders as a protection against the Ağaçeri tribe. Constant raids of merchants from Sivas by Turkmens ignited a new conflict with Kadi Burhan al-Din in 1398. Burhan al-Din threatened Suli and demanded the repayment for the damages caused. However, this did not come to fruition, since both rulers would be killed the same year.

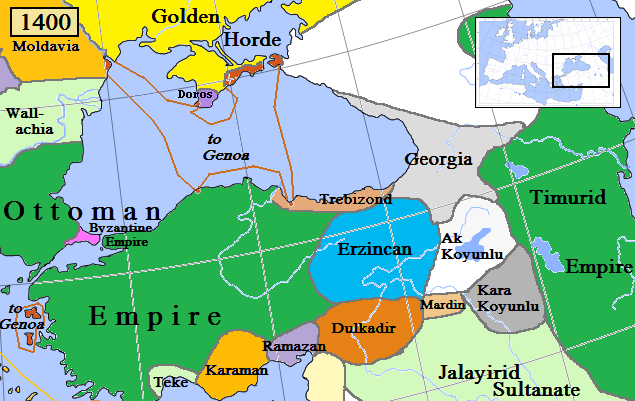
Dulkadir, c. 1400

Arab historians of that era, who dubbed him Haykal al-Turkman (lit. 'temple of the Turkmens'), described Shaban Suli as just to his subjects but cruel to his enemies. According to al-Ayni, Suli liked torturing people and was always intoxicated.

== Assassination ==
Suli was stabbed to death when he was sleeping in his tent on the way to the yaylak (summer highland pasture) near Marash in May 1398. His assassination was carried out by a member of his son and successor Sadaqa's retinue, Ali Khan, on the orders of Barquq. Ali Khan managed to escape and received numerous gifts from Barquq. He was further appointed as the amīr ʿashara of Antakya.

Al-Maqrizi deviates from other historians by narrating that Ali Khan was a relative of Suli who escaped to Aleppo after a disagreement with Suli. According to al-Maqrizi, Ali Khan sent his servant Ali Kassir north, who managed to stay in Suli's encampment by lying that he was beaten badly by his master Ali Khan. Suli is explained to have passed out drunk in his tent and would then be murdered by Ali Kassir. Al-Maqrizi notes that Barquq granted Ali Kassir the rank amīr ʿashara (lit. 'emir of ten') and Ali Khan amīr al-ṭabl (lit. 'emir of the drums').

== Family ==
Apart from his son and successor Sadaqa, Shaban Suli had three daughters, one married to Rahat oghlu Ala al-Din Ali of Sivas, another married to Kadi Burhan al-Din, and reputedly Devlet Hatun, consort of Bayezid I (r. 1389–1402) of the Ottomans.

== Bibliography ==
- Alıç, Samet (2020). "The Dulkadir's Emirs Killed by the Mamluks". The Journal of Selcuk University Social Sciences Institute (in Turkish) (43): 83–94. ISSN 2667-4750.
- Öztuna, Yılmaz (2005). Devletler ve hanedanlar: Türkiye (1074-1990) (in Turkish). Ministry of Culture. ISBN 9751704693. OCLC 949531568.
- Peirce, Leslie (2003). Morality Tales: Law and Gender in the Ottoman Court of Aintab. University of California Press. ISBN 9780520228924. OCLC 52471062.
- Venzke, Margaret L. (2000). "The Case of a Dulgadir-Mamluk Iqṭāʿ: A Re-Assessment of the Dulgadir Principality and Its Position within the Ottoman-Mamluk Rivalry". Journal of the Economic and Social History of the Orient. 43 (3): 399–474. doi:10.1163/156852000511349. ISSN 0022-4995. JSTOR 3632448.
- Venzke, Margaret L. (2017). "Dulkadir". In Fleet, Kate; Krämer, Gudrun; Matringe, Denis; Nawas, John; Rowson, Everett (eds.). Encyclopaedia of Islam (3rd ed.). Brill Online. ISSN 1873-9830.
- Yinanç, Refet (1989). Dulkadir Beyliği (in Turkish). Ankara: Turkish Historical Society Press. ISBN 9751601711. OCLC 21676736.
- Yinanç, Refet (1994). "Dulkadiroğulları". TDV Encyclopedia of Islam, Vol. 9 (Dârüsaâde – Dulkadi̇roğulları) (in Turkish). Istanbul: Presidency of Religious Affairs, Centre for Islamic Studies. pp. 553–557. ISBN 978-975-389-436-4.
