= Zayn al-Din Qaraja =

Beg of Dulkadir from 1337 to 1353

Qaraja Beg
- al-Malik al-Zāhir (Note: lit. 'The Apparent King'); al-Malik al-Qāhir (Note: lit. 'The Victorious King')

Beg of Dulkadir
- Reign: 1337–1353
- Coronation: 1337
- Predecessor: Position established
- Successor: Ghars al-Din Khalil
- Born: c. 1279 (Note: Based on the erroneous belief by the Ottoman writers Halil Edhem and Ahmed Arifi Pasha that he died 100 years old in 1378–9.)
- Died: 11 December 1353; Cairo, Mamluk Sultanate
- Issue: Ghars al-Din Khalil; Sarim al-Din Ibrahim; Isa; Shaban Suli; Osman; Davud
Names
- Ḏulkadiroglu Zayn-al-Dīn Qarāja at-Turkmānī
- House: Dulkadir
- Father: Dulkadir
- Religion: Islam

Zayn al-Din Qaraja Beg (Turkish: Zeyneddin Karaca Bey; c. 1279 – 11 December 1353) was a Turkoman chieftain who founded the Dulkadirid principality in southern Anatolia and northern Syria, ruling from 1337 to 1353. Before his ascendance, Qaraja competed with Taraqlu, another local Turkoman warlord, over the administration of the northern frontier of the Mamluks. After gaining recognition from the Mamluk Sultan Al-Nasir Muhammad, he became the head of a client state on their Anatolian extremity. During his rule, Qaraja grew more ambitious and clashed with various Mamluk governors who were against his expanding influence. Qaraja took advantage of the political turmoil within the Mamluks and declared independence in 1348. However, this led to his imprisonment and subsequent execution in 1353.

== Early life and background ==
During the thirteenth century, the region around Marash in southern Anatolia was ruled by the Armenian Kingdom of Cilicia. The region came under the dominion of the Mamluk Sultanate of Egypt in 1298. Qaraja was one of the Turkoman lords, or begs, dwelling there who were granted the right to administer part of the region by the Mamluks. Qaraja founded the Dulkadirid principality around the same time the Eretnids emerged in central and eastern Anatolia, which was a breakaway state from the Ilkhanids led by the Turco-Mongol officer Eretna.

Pre-Dulkadirid southern Anatolia and northern Syria

Qaraja likely belonged to the Bayat tribe. He became the leader of the Bozok tribal confederation in northern Syria after his father died in 1310 or 1311. The first mention of him in sources is thought to be from 1317, when the Mamluk Sultan Al-Nasir Muhammad granted a Turkoman lord residing in Birga (Note: Historically known by names such as Bile, Birtha, and Birah, and in modern times as Birecik.) the title emir.

== Rise to power ==
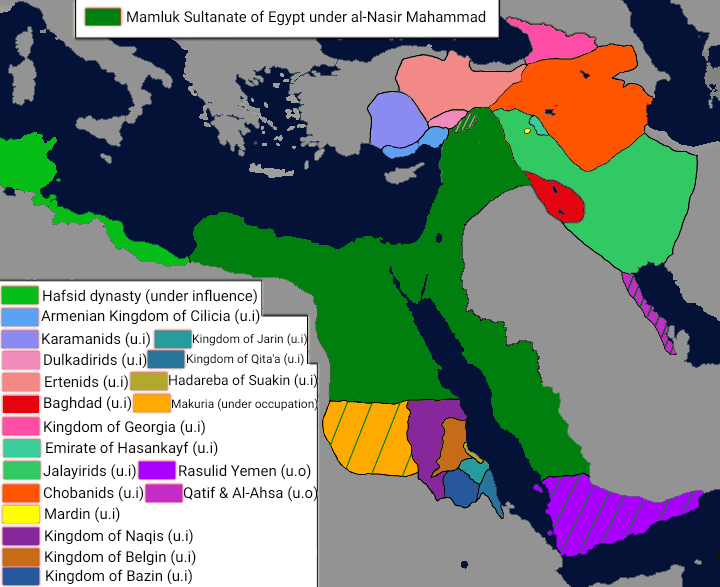
Rough borders of the Mamluk Sultanate under Al-Nasir Muhammad's rule (1310–1341) and the neighbors of the Mamluks, including the Dulkadirids.

Another local ruler, Taraqlu Khalil bin Tarafi, had earlier captured Elbistan from the Eretnids. In order to expand his authority over the region by pledging allegiance to the Mamluks, Taraqlu sent a gift of 100 horses to the emir of Aleppo, Altunbogha, and visited the sultan in Cairo. As a response to this threat to his political presence, Qaraja sent his son Khalil to lead an offensive against Taraqlu. Elbistan was captured by the Dulkadirids in 1335 or 1337. Taraqlu's ally, Altunbogha, threatened Qaraja and demanded that he come to Aleppo. Instead, Qaraja allied himself with Tankiz, the governor of Damascus and rival of Altunbogha. Meanwhile, Qaraja faced another threat; Tashgun, another local emir backed by Altunbogha, started raiding and harassing the Dulkadirids, though Tashgun was eventually caught with the intervention of Tankiz.

The Sultan finally summoned the governors, Taraqlu, and Qaraja. Tankiz defended Qaraja and recommended to the sultan that Qaraja would be better able to maintain Mamluk authority over the region, insisting that Taraqlu possessed no more than a thousand horsemen. Al-Nasir Muhammad thus recognized Qaraja as the Emir of the Turkomans and the na'ib of the lands stretching from Marash to Elbistan in 1337. The next year, Qaraja also captured Harpoot, Darende, Gemerek, and Gürün from the Eretnids.

== Downfall and execution ==
Qaraja's ambition to become an independent ruler manifested after al-Nasir Muhammad's death in 1341 and the consequent unrest in Egypt. He tried to gain Eretna's trust in order to organize a joint campaign to take over Aleppo. Emir Tashtimur of Aleppo requested assistance from Egypt, but this proved to be futile as Cairo was facing internal power struggles. The prominent Mamluk emir Qawsun overthrew Al-Mansur Abu Bakr and installed Abu Bakr's seven-year-old brother Al-Ashraf Kujuk on the Mamluk throne. This led to Tashtimur's rebellion, who now found his situation reversed as he was pursued by the Mamluks and escaped to Eretna in the north with the protection of Qaraja. When An-Nasir Ahmad briefly came to power amidst the political vacuum and invited Tashtimur, who supported him, to Cairo for a new appointment, Qaraja escorted him there. But Tashtimur was instead jailed and executed for unknown reasons, while Qaraja swiftly returned north.

Qaraja's relations with the Mamluks further deteriorated in 1343, when the Dulkadir Turkomans robbed a caravan containing Eretna's gifts to the Mamluk emir Yalbugha, though Qaraja was able to get a pardon from the sultan. He led several incursions into the Armenian Kingdom of Cilicia, looting the region and occupying Androun and Kapan in 1345. In 1348, gaining confidence from his victories, he declared independence as Malik al-Qāhir. Qaraja further joined emir Baybugha's revolt against the Mamluk state and defeated Yalbugha. In response, Mamluk governors of Syria and rival Turkoman tribal leaders joined forces, supposedly raising 10 to 25 thousand troops. They ransacked Elbistan as well as the nearby villages, while Qaraja fled to Mount Düldül. Two of his sons, including his successor Ghars al-Din Khalil Beg, tried to fend off the Mamluk forces but were defeated and captured.

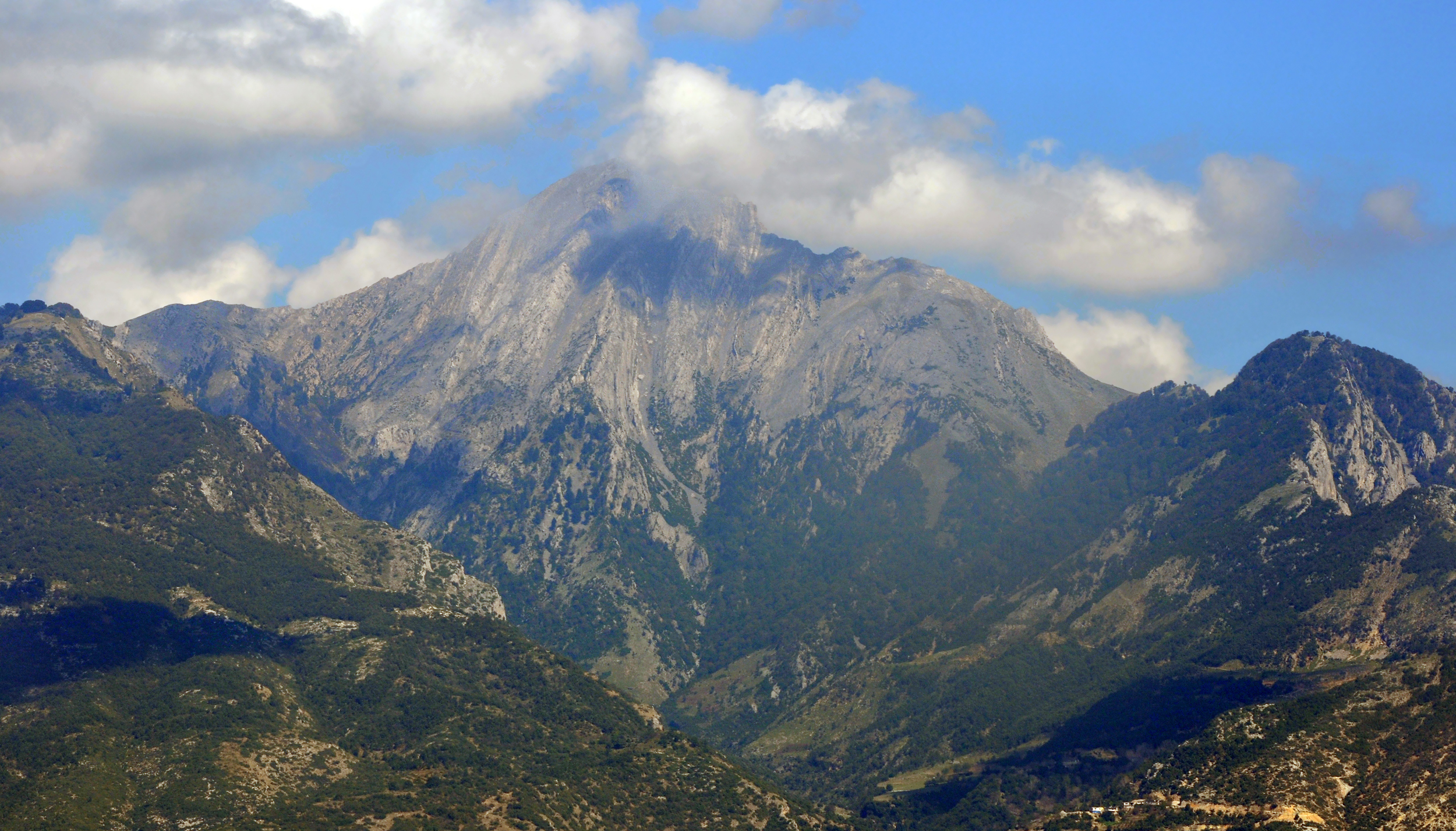
Mount Düldül is located southwest of Marash.

In 1353, Qaraja took refuge in the court of the Eretnid ruler Ghiyath al-Din Muhammad I, but at the request of the Mamluks he was chained and sent to Aleppo on 22 September 1353, for which Muhammad was paid 500 thousand dinars. One of Qaraja's sons agreed with the Bedouin leader Jabbar bin Muhanna to attack Aleppo in order to save his father. This was unsuccessful and further angered Sultan Salih, who demanded Qaraja's transfer to Cairo. Sultan Salih scolded him in person and kept him in the Citadel of Cairo. After being imprisoned for 48 days, he was tortured to death on 11 December 1353. His corpse was left hanging in Bab Zuweila for 3 days.

Although disproven by medieval Arab historians, late Ottoman sources, such as Halil Edhem and Ahmed Arifi Pasha, popularly believed that Qaraja continued to resist the Mamluks until he died of old age at around 100 in 1378 or 1379.

== Family ==
Qaraja had 6 sons: Khalil, Ibrahim, Isa, Suli, Osman, and Davud. Ghars al-Din Khalil succeeded Qaraja as the second ruler of the Dulkadirids. Suli was the third ruler of the Dulkadirids. Sarim al-Din Ibrahim became the lord of Harpoot and was appointed by the Mamluks as amīr ṭablkhāna (lit. 'amir of the band') of Damascus as a gesture of goodwill to keep his father, Qaraja, as an ally. Qaraja is known to have had a brother and cousin, both of whom were given land by the Mamluk sultan in 1344 or 1345.

== See also ==
- al-Maqrizi, one of the medieval historians who wrote about Zayn al-Din
- Ramadanids, neighboring Turkoman principality

== Bibliography ==
- Alıç, Samet (2020). "Memlûkler Tarafından Katledilen Dulkadir Emirleri" [The Dulkadir's Emirs Killed by the Mamluks]. The Journal of Selcuk University Social Sciences Institute (in Turkish) (43): 83–94.
- Bosworth, Clifford Edmund (1996). New Islamic Dynasties: A Chronological and Genealogical Manual. Edinburgh University Press.
- Har-El, Shai (1995). Struggle for Domination in the Middle East: The Ottoman-Mamluk War, 1485-91. E.J. Brill. ISBN 9004101802.
- Kaya, Abdullah (2014). "Dulkadirli Beyliği'nin Eratnalılar ile Münasebetleri" [Relations between Dulkadirli Beylik and the Eretnids]. Mustafa Kemal University Journal of Graduate School of Social Sciences (in Turkish). 11 (25): 81–97.
- Merçil, Erdoğan (1991). Müslüman-Türk devletleri tarihi [A history of Muslim-Turkish states] (in Turkish). Turkish Historical Society Press.
- Oberling, Pierre (1995). "Ḏu'l-Qadr". In Yarshater, Ehsan (ed.). Encyclopædia Iranica. Vol. VII/6: Drugs–Ebn al-Aṯir. London and New York: Routledge & Kegan Paul. pp. 573–574. ISBN 978-1-56859-024-0.
- Sinclair, Thomas Alan (1987). Eastern Turkey An Architectural and Archaeological Survey. Vol. II. Pindar Press.
- Toursarkisian, Garabed (1897). "Histoire de Zeïtoun" [A history of Zeytun (now Süleymanlı)]. Mercure de France (in French): 25–175.
- Venzke, Margaret L. (2000). "The Case of a Dulgadir-Mamluk Iqṭāʿ: A Re-Assessment of the Dulgadir Principality and Its Position within the Ottoman-Mamluk Rivalry". Journal of the Economic and Social History of the Orient. 43 (3): 399–474. doi:10.1163/156852000511349. JSTOR 3632448.
- Venzke, Margaret L. (2017). "Dulkadir". In Fleet, Kate; Krämer, Gudrun; Matringe, Denis; Nawas, John; Rowson, Everett (eds.). Encyclopaedia of Islam (3rd ed.). Brill Online. ISSN 1873-9830.
- von Zambaur, Eduard Karl Max (1927). Manuel de généalogie et de chronologie pour l'histoire de l'Islam avec 20 tableaux généalogiques hors texte et 5 cartes [Handbook of genealogy and chronology for the history of Islam: with 20 additional genealogical tables and 5 maps] (in French). H. Lafaire.
- Yinanç, Refet (1988). Dulkadir Beyliği (in Turkish). Ankara: Turkish Historical Society Press.
