= Darende =

- District and municipality
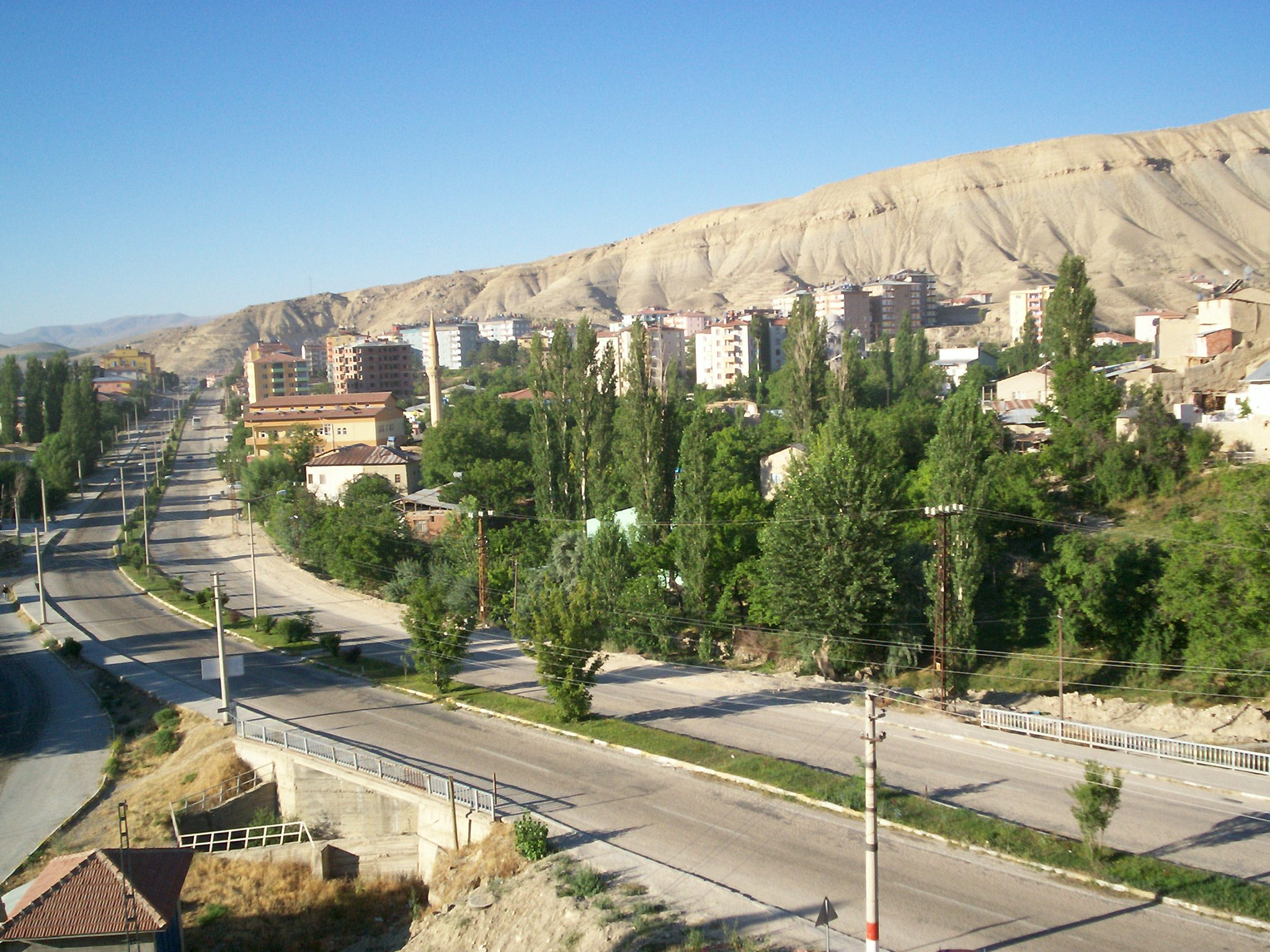

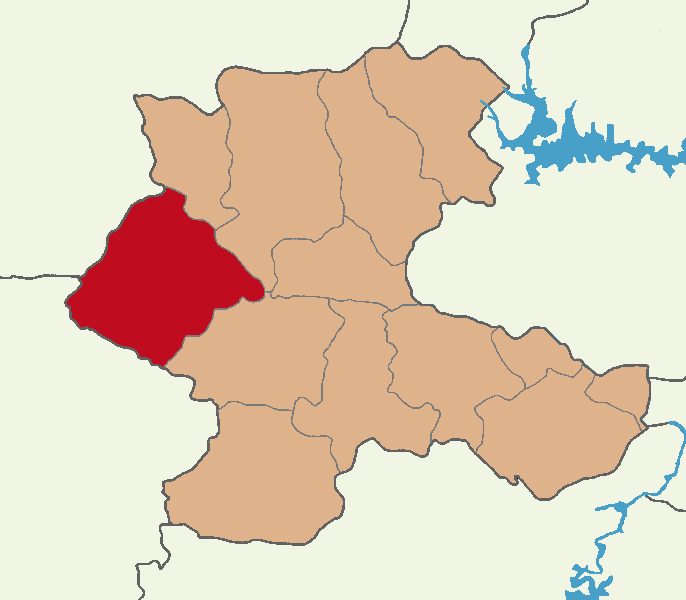
- Map showing Darende District in Malatya Province

- Location within Turkey
- Coordinates: 38°32′50″N 37°30′40″E
- Country: Turkey
- Province: Malatya

Government
  - Mayor: İsa Özkan (AKP)
- Area: 1,482 km^{2} (572 sq mi)
- Elevation: 958 m (3,143 ft)
- Population (2022): 24,588
  - Density: 16.59/km^{2} (42.97/sq mi)
- Time zone: UTC+3 (TRT)
- Postal code: 44700
- Area code: 0422
- Website: www.darende.bel.tr

Darende (Turkish: Darende [daɾændæ]) is a municipality and district of Malatya Province, Turkey. Its area is 1,482 km^{2}, and its population is 24,588 (2022). It lies 74 kilometres (46 mi) to the northwest of Malatya, 140 kilometres (87 mi) south of Sivas, 180 kilometres (110 mi) east of Kayseri.

== History ==
Darende had been known by various names including Taranda/Daranda, and Derindere. It has been presumed that the district had been inhabited since 7000-5000 BC due to the estimations made for the nearby archaeological sites such as Arslantepe and Cafer Höyük.

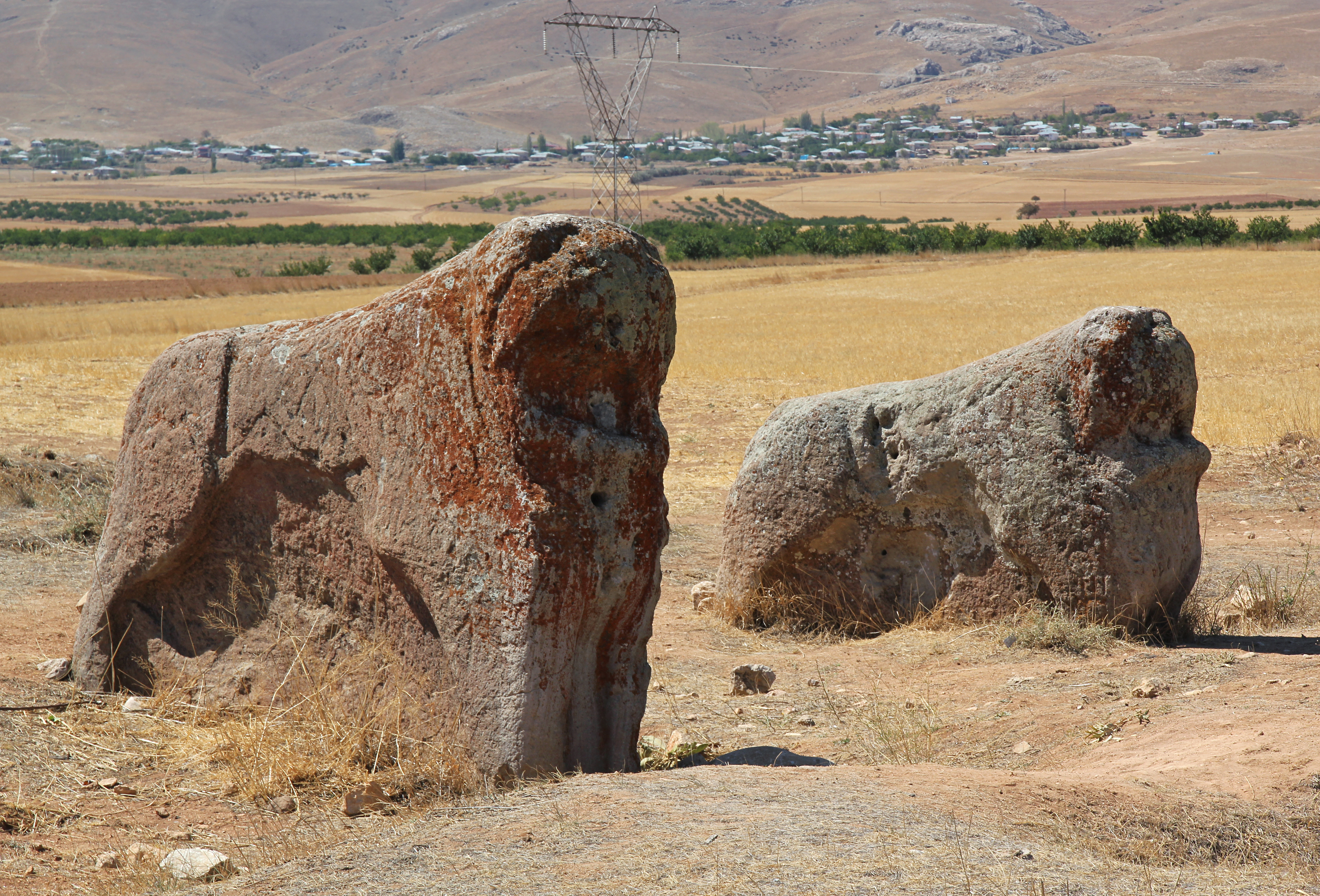
Hittite lion statues

The first known administrative unit in Darende was reportedly established by Hittites. One of the Hittites remains within the district is a pair of lion statues residing around Arslantaş region, the west of Darende. In chronological order, the governance to date was controlled by Hittites, Mitanni, Assyrians, Achaemenids, Romans, Byzantines, Umayyads, Abbasids, Seljuks, Danishmends, Rum Seljuks, Ilkhanids, Eretnids, Dulkadirids, Mamluks and Ottomans.

Due to the configuration of the natural canyons surrounding the district (e.g. Tohma Canyon), the district has been reported to be one of the hops residing on trade, migration and military routes connecting various neighbouring regions; as an example, Šuppiluliuma I, who expanded Hittites across the Mediterranean and the Mesopotamia against Egyptian Empire, had been using the district to access the south, and Basil I had been carried out his expeditions against Muslims over the district.

During the Roman reign of 200 AD, Darende was one of the Roman settlements which was deduced from the records that the Roman Emperor Trajan had transformed the neighbouring encampment of Melitene into a municipium against the Parthian Empire during the same period. One of the Roman sites within the district is the Ozan Monument which is a single-chamber mausoleum dating back either 200 AD or 50 AD, presumably a popular monument style in Anatolia during the Hellenistic Period.

Early Muslim conquests reached the region during Caliph Omar's reign and the district was conquered by Habib ibn Maslama for a short period of time, and it was reconquered by the same commander during Mu'awiya I's reign around 653–654. Between 7th and 12th centuries, the administration of the district had changed hands rather frequently; however, Darende seems not to be noted until, for the first time, Taranta had been registered as a bishop under the metropolitan bishop of Melitene in the 13th Notitiae Episcopatuum (12th century).

== Composition ==
There are 67 neighbourhoods in Darende District:

- Ağılbaşı
- Ağılyazı
- Akbaba
- Akçatoprak
- Akova
- Aşağıulupınar
- Ayvalı
- Balaban
- Barındır
- Başkaya
- Baytarbağı
- Beybağı
- Çaybaşı
- Çınar
- Çukurkaya
- Gaziköy
- Gökçeören
- Gökyar
- Göllüce
- Güdül
- Günerli
- Günpınar
- Hacı Derviş
- Hacılar Şeyhli
- Hacılar Sıragoz
- Hacolar
- Heyiketeği
- Hisarcık
- Hisarkale
- İbrahimpaşa
- Ilıca
- Irmaklı
- Kaldırım
- Karabacak
- Karabayır
- Karaoğuz
- Kavak
- Kaynak
- Kerimli
- Kılıçbağı
- Kölükler
- Kurudere
- Kuzpınar
- Medişeyh
- Mehmetpaşa
- Mollauşağı
- Nadir
- Nurkuyusu
- Ozan
- Palanga
- Sakarya
- Sandıkkaya
- Sayfiye
- Şendere
- Şuğul
- Sungur
- Üçpınar
- Uzunhasan
- Yarımca
- Yavuzlar
- Yazıköy
- Yenice
- Yeniköy
- Yenipınar
- Yeşiltaş
- Yukarıulupınar
- Zaviye

== Demographics ==
Evliya Çelebi claimed that the town's population was wholly made up of Armenians and Turkomans at the time of his travels.

== Culture ==
=== Folk music ===
A metadata analysis on Turkish folk music in Darende has reported twelve ballads of the district:

Darende ballads
Ballad	Turkish makam	Compiler
Arpa derdim süt iken	Hüseyni	Muzaffer Sarısözen
Çık daldan erik devşir	Uşşâk	Nazmi Özalp
Değirmenin postu dar	Hüseyni	Muzaffer Sarısözen
Değirmen üstü çiçek	Muhayyer	Ahmet Yamacı/Turhan Karabulut
Dereden duman galktı	Hüseyni	Yücel Paşmakçı
Elinde de şişe	Hüseyni	Muzaffer Sarısözen
Eğer yârin sana yaran olursa	Muhayyer	Yücel Paşmakçı
Kırmızı gül goncasını	Nikriz	Turhan Karabulut
Sabahınan sabahınan	Hüseyni	Muzaffer Sarısözen
Su içtim yudum yudum	Hüseyni	Nazmi Özalp
Su gelir lüle lüle	Muhayyer	Muzaffer Sarısözen
Sarı çiçek sarardıyı dağları	Hüseyni	Nazmi Özalp

=== Language of Hazeyince ===
Within the circles of craftsman and little artisan of Darende, a cryptolect (mini secret language) called Hazeyince/Hazeynce had been emerged and being used to date. The vocabulary of the cant fetched words from various languages such as Arabic, Persian and Russian, and merged into the Turkish grammar in order to exclude people outside of the circle during communications when necessary.

=== Festivals ===
One of the traditional-summer festivals being held in Darende is the Zengibar Karakucak Wrestling Festival, which is a Oguz-Turkic folk wrestling style.

== Notable people ==
- Somuncu Baba (1331–1412), Ascetic Islamic preacher
- Darendeli Cebecizade Mehmed Pasha (1714-1784), Grand Vizier of the Ottoman Empire
- Darendeli Topal Izzet Mehmed Pasha (1723-1784) Grand Vizier of the Ottoman Empire
- Topal Izzet Mehmed Pasha (1792–1855), Grand Vizier of the Ottoman Empire
