= Beylik of Dulkadir =

Turkish principality in Anatolia, between 1337-1522

Dulkadirids
- 1337–1522
- An anachronistic map of the Anatolian beyliks in around 1330
- Capital: Elbistan (1337–1507); Marash (1507–1522)
- Religion: Islam (Sunni and Shia), Christianity
- Government: Beylik
- Beg
  - 1337: Zayn al-Din Qaraja
  - 1522: Ali
- Historical era: Late Medieval
  - Established: 1337
  - Disestablished: 1522

Area
- 70,000 km^{2} (27,000 sq mi)
Preceded by	Succeeded by
Ilkhanate; Mamluk Sultanate	Dulkadir Eyalet

The Beylik of Dulkadir (Turkish: Dulkadiroğulları Beyliği) was one of the Turkish Anatolian beyliks (principality) established by the Oghuz Turk clans Bayat, Afshar, and Begdili after the decline of Seljuk Sultanate of Rûm.

== Etymology ==
The meaning of Dulkadir is unclear. It was later Arabized or reinterpreted according to folk tradition as Dhu'l-Qadr, which means 'powerful' or 'mighty'. According to 16th-century German historian Johannes Leunclavius, Dulkadir was a corruption of the Turkic name Torghud. Franz Babinger considered it very probable, as the name was likely derived from some Turkish name, further suggesting that this would also mean the dynasty of Dulkadir is related to the Turkoman Turghudlu tribe. On the other hand, Annemarie von Gabain proposed tulga-dar (lit. 'helmet-bearer') as the original Turkic word it sprang from. According to Turkologist Louis Bazin, the name may be rooted in the term "dolga," which means "to hurt" or "to agonize". Historian Faruk Sümer suggested that Dulkadir could be the Turkmen pronunciation of the Muslim given name Abdul Qadir, parallel to how the Ilkhanate ruler Abu Sa'id (r. 1316–35) was known as "Busad" by his Turkmen subjects. Another historian, Refet Yinanç, supported Sümer's view.

Medieval Armenian authors referred to the Dulkadirids as Tulgharts'i, Tulgharats'i, Dulgharats'i, Tulghatarts'i, or Dulghatarts'i. While Persian sources spelled Dulkadir as Zulkadir, Arabic sources spelled it as Dulgadir or Tulgadir. Ottoman sources used a combination of Zulkadir and Dulkadir.

== History ==
The principality was founded by Zayn al-Din Qaraja, a Turkoman chieftain, likely from the Bayat tribe, who established himself in the region of Elbistan in 1335, taking the town in 1337 and obtaining the title of na'ib from the Mamluk Sultan Al-Nasir Muhammad. In 1515, after the Battle of Turnadağ, the principality was conquered by the Ottoman Sultan Selim I and his grand vizier Hadım Sinan Pasha and converted into a sanjak.

== Society ==
=== Gender relations ===
Fifteenth-century Burgundian traveler Bertrandon de la Broquière attested to female soldiers living in Dulkadir. Bohemian traveler Hans Dernschwam mentioned that the local women rode horses well comparable to men, whereas the women in Constantinople were low profile in contrast. However, the Dulkadir Kanunname (code of law) maintained a militantly masculine approach to gender relations similar to its Ottoman counterpart.

== List of rulers ==
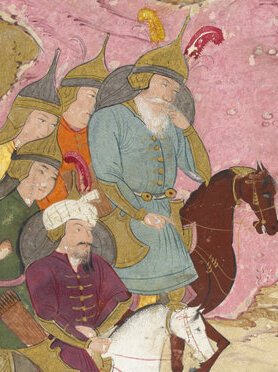
'Ala' al-Dawla Dhu'l-qadr with his troops. Painted circa 1650. British Museum, Or. 3248

No.	Rulers	Regin Start	Regin End
1.	Zayn al-Din Qaraja	1337	1353
2.	Ghars al-Din Khalil	1353	1386
3.	Shaban Suli	1386	1398
4.	Sadaqa Beg	1398	1399
5.	Nasir al-Din Mehmed Beg	1399	1442
6.	Suleiman Beg	1442	1454
7.	Sayf al-Din Malik Arslan	1454	1465
8.	Shah Budak	1st.1465 2nd.1472	1st.1466 2nd.1480
9.	Shah Suwar Al-Muzaffar	1466	1472
10.	Ala al-Dawla Bozkurt	1480	1515
11.	Ali Beg	1515	1522

== Bibliography ==
- Alıç, Samet (2020). "Memlûkler Tarafından Katledilen Dulkadir Emirleri" [The Dulkadir's Emirs Killed by the Mamluks]. The Journal of Selcuk University Social Sciences Institute (in Turkish) (43): 83–94.
- Babinger, Franz (2012). "Ṭorg̲h̲ud-eli". In Houtsma, M. Th.; Arnold, T. W.; Basset, R.; Hartmann, R. (eds.). Encyclopaedia of Islam. Vol. I. Brill.
- Bosworth, Clifford Edmund (1996). New Islamic Dynasties: A Chronological and Genealogical Manual. Edinburgh University Press.
- Har-El, Shai (1995). Struggle for Domination in the Middle East: The Ottoman-Mamluk War, 1485-91. E.J. Brill. ISBN 9004101802.
- Mordtmann, Johannes Heinrich & Ménage, Victor Louis (2012). "Ḏh̲u 'l-Ḳadr". Encyclopaedia of Islam New Edition Online. Leiden: E. J. Brill. doi:10.1163/1573-3912_islam_SIM_1828.
- Öztuna, Yılmaz (2005). Devletler ve hanedanlar: Türkiye (1074-1990) (in Turkish). Ministry of Culture. ISBN 9751704693. OCLC 949531568.
- Peirce, Leslie (2010). "Domesticating Sexuality: Harem Culture in Ottoman Imperial Law". In Booth, Marilyn (ed.). Harem Histories: Envisioning Places and Living Spaces. Duke University Press. ISBN 9780822348696. OCLC 876167090.
- Sanjian, Avedis K. (5 February 1969). Colophons of Armenian Manuscripts, 1301-1480, A Source for Middle Eastern History (PDF). Cambridge, Massachusetts: Harvard University Press. ISBN 9780674432611. OCLC 54310.
- Venzke, Margaret L. (2017). "Dulkadir". In Fleet, Kate; Krämer, Gudrun; Matringe, Denis; Nawas, John; Rowson, Everett (eds.). Encyclopaedia of Islam (3rd ed.). Brill Online. ISSN 1873-9830.
- Yinanç, Refet (1989). Dulkadir Beyliği (in Turkish). Ankara: Turkish Historical Society Press. ISBN 9751601711. OCLC 21676736.
