= Euphrates-Tigris Expedition =

- Part of Ottoman–Persian War (1505–1517) and Ottoman–Mamluk War (1516–1517)
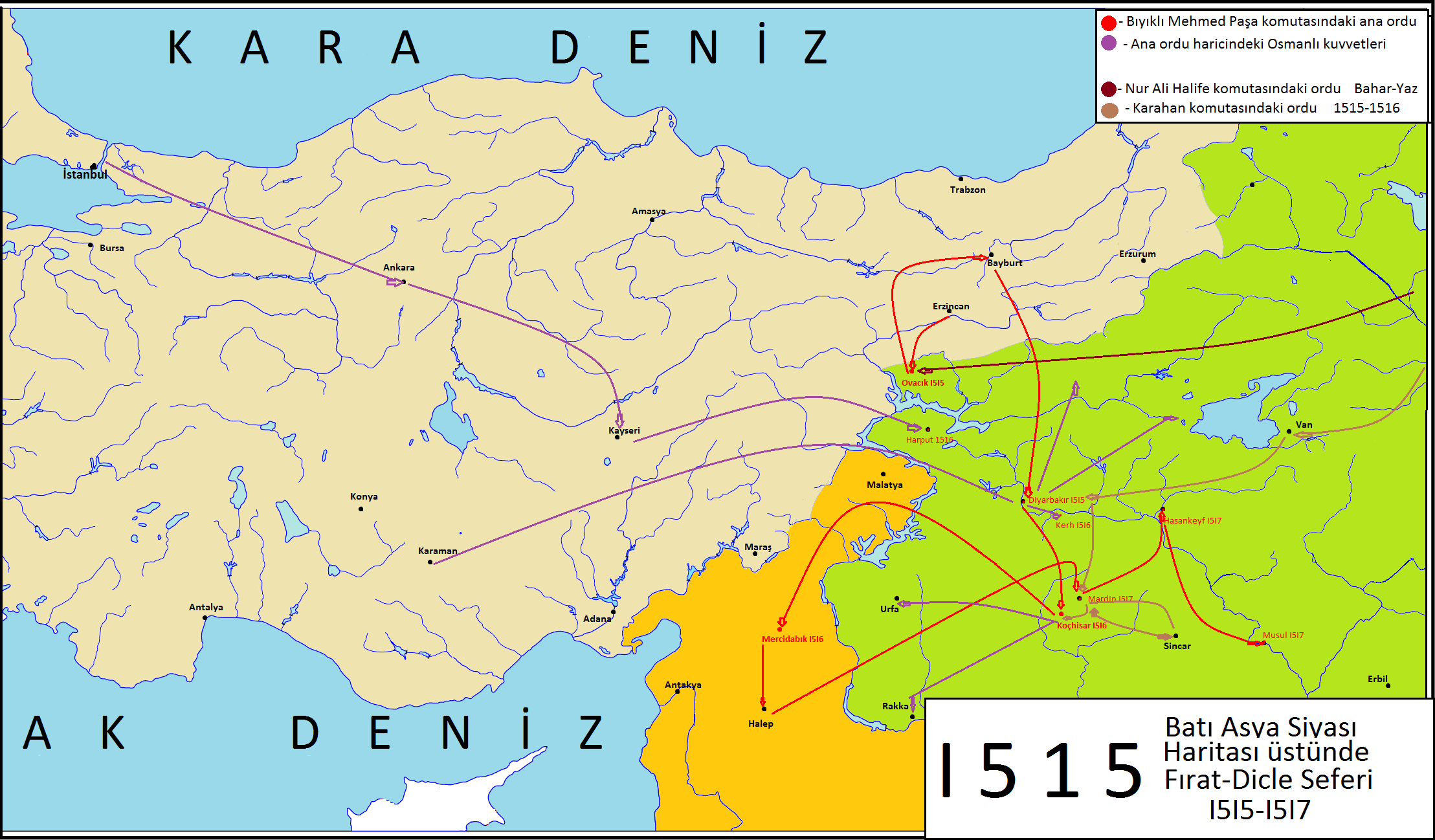
- The Euphrates-Tigris Expedition
Date	Spring 1514 – Summer 1516
Location	Iraq, Syria, Middle East
Result	Ottoman victory
Territorial changes	Southeastern Anatolia, Northern Iraq, and Northern Syria came under Ottoman rule

Belligerents
Ottoman Empire	Safavid Iran Mamluk Sultanate

Commanders and leaders
(Ottoman Empire) Selim I (Ottoman Empire) Bıyıklı Mehmed Pasha (Ottoman Empire) Deli Husrev Pasha (Ottoman Empire) Idris Bitlisi	Ismail I Qara Khan Ustajlu; Nur-Ali Khalifa †; Suleiman Ustajlu †; Durmush Beg Qansuh II al-Ghuri †; Pîr Budakoğlu Arslan †; Amir Tarabay †; Amir Akbay †

The Euphrates-Tigris Expedition was a military expedition conducted by the Ottoman army against the Safavids and the Mamluks. It resulted in a victory for the Ottoman Empire.

== Background ==
In 1514, Selim I attacked the Safavid Empire to stop the spread of Shiism into Ottoman dominions. Selim and Ismā'il had exchanged a series of belligerent letters prior to the attack. On his march to face Ismā'il, Selim had 50,000 Alevis massacred, seeing them as enemies of the Ottoman Empire.

Selim I defeated Ismā'il at the Battle of Chaldiran in 1514. Ismā'il's army was more mobile and his soldiers better prepared, but the Ottomans prevailed due in large part to their efficient modern army, possession of artillery, black powder and muskets. Ismā'il was wounded and almost captured in battle, and Selim I entered the Iranian capital of Tabriz in triumph on 5 September, but did not linger. The Battle of Chaldiran was of historical significance: the reluctance of Shah Ismail to accept the advantages of modern firearms and the importance of artillery proved decisive. After the battle, Selim, referring to Ismail, stated that his adversary was: "Always drunk to the point of losing his mind and totally neglectful of the affairs of the state".

== Expedition ==
Following their victory, the Ottomans captured the Safavid capital city of Tabriz on 7 September, which they first pillaged and then evacuated. That week's Friday sermon in mosques throughout the city was delivered in Selim's name. Selim was however unable to press on after Tabriz due to the discontent amongst the janissaries. The Ottoman Empire successfully annexed Eastern Anatolia (encompassing Western Armenia) and Upper Mesopotamia from the Safavids. These areas changed hands several times over the following decades; however, the Ottoman hold would not be set until the 1555 Peace of Amasya following the Ottoman–Safavid War (1532–1555). Effective governmental rule and eyalets would not be established over these regions until the 1639 Treaty of Zuhab.

Ottoman reinforcements (1515–1516)
Commander	Date of dispatch	Strength	Troop type
Deli Husrev Pasha	25 November	12,000	Sipahi and subaşı
Kethüda Mehmet Çelebi	26 November	400	Unknown
Garip Mehmet Bey	27 November	500	Ulufeci
Unknown	Unknown	1,000	Janissaries (musketeers)
Sinan and Bali Aghas	Unknown	5,000	Unknown

Selim I launched an attack on the Mamluks in 1516. The Ottoman army and the Mamluk army met near Marj Dabiq. The Mamluk army advanced and on 20 August made camp at the plain of Marj Dabiq, a day's journey north of Aleppo. There, al-Ghawri and his men awaited the enemy's approach on this plain, where the sultanate's fate would soon be decided.

According to the History of Egypt composed by Muḥammad ibn Aḥmad ibn Iyas, the Mamluks arranged themselves with the Sultan occupying the center column. Sibay, the Governor of Damascus, commanded the right flank, and Khai'r Bey, governor of Aleppo, took the left.

The marshal Sûdûn Adjami was the first to enter combat, followed by Sibay, leading an experienced corps of veteran Mamluk warriors. They rushed into battle and managed to kill several thousand Ottoman soldiers in the first hours of fighting. This advantage forced the opposite Ottoman wing to begin a withdrawal, and the Mamluk forces under Sibay succeeded in taking several pieces of artillery and capturing some fusiliers. Selim considered retreat or requesting a truce.

It was at this point that the battle turned against the Mamluks. A rumor began to spread that al-Ghawri had ordered the recruits to hold their position, avoid combat, and leave the fighting to the veteran soldiers who were already engaged in battle. When Marshall Sûdûn Adjami and Sibay, who were leading the attack, were suddenly killed, panic broke out in the Mamluks' advancing right flank. Meanwhile, Khai'r Bey, in command of the left flank, called for a retreat. The fact that his forces were the first to quit the field was considered evidence of the man's betrayal.

Ibn Iyas offered the following account of the Mamluk defeat:

The sultan stood under his standard and called to his soldiers: "Aghas! This is the moment to take heart! Fight, and I will reward you!" But no one listened and the men fled from the battle. "Pray to God to give us victory!" Called al-Ghawri. This is the moment for prayer." But he found neither support nor defenders. He then began to feel an unquenchable fire. This was a particularly hot day, and an unusual fog of dust had risen between the armies. It was the day of God's anger directed against the Egyptian army, which stopped fighting. At the worst moment, and with the situation growing worse, the emir Timur Zardkash feared for the safety of the battle standard, lowered and stowed it, then came to find the sultan. He said to him: "Lord Sultan, the Ottoman army has defeated us. Save yourself and flee to Aleppo." When the sultan realized this, he was gripped by a sort of paralysis that affected the side of his body, and his jaw dropped open. He asked for water, which was brought to him in a golden goblet. He drank some, turned his horse to flee, advanced two paces, and fell from his saddle. After that, little by little, he surrendered his soul.

Selim I, welcomed by the inhabitants as a deliverer from the excesses of the Mamluks, entered Aleppo in triumph. He received the Abbasid caliph warmly, but upbraided the Islamic judges and jurists for their failure to check Mamluk misrule. Joined by Khai'r Bey and other Egyptian officers, he proceeded to the Citadel.

From Aleppo, he marched with his forces to Damascus, where terror prevailed. Beyond some attempts to protect the city by flooding the plain around, the remnants of the Mamluk forces had done nothing substantial to oppose the enemy. Discord amongst the emirs had paralyzed the army and prevented any decisive action that might have affected the subsequent course of events. Some of al-Ghawri's lieutenants supported Emir Janberdi Al-Ghazali as the new sultan, but others favoured the deceased ruler's son. As the Ottomans approached, however, resistance dissolved, as the remaining forces either went over to their side or fled to Egypt. Selim I entered Damascus in mid-October, and the inhabitants readily surrendered to the conquerors.

== Aftermath ==
Of the territories captured during this campaign, none, with the exception of Northern Iraq, ever left Turkish control again. Although Mosul was briefly lost in the 16th century, it was quickly recaptured and remained under Turkish rule until World War I. Most of the Kurdish chieftains who participated in the campaign had been displaced from their lands by Shah Ismail. Therefore, they joined the campaign, and as a reward, their former homelands were returned to them as privileged provinces by Yavuz Sultan Selim.

== List of conflicts ==
Euphrates–Tigris campaign (1515–1517)
Name	Location	Date	Ottoman commander	Safavid / Mamluk commander	Result
Battle of Urfa (1514)	Urfa, Turkey	1514	Murad Bey †	Eçe Sultan Qajar	Safavid victory
Battle of Ovacık (1515)	Tunceli, Turkey	June 1515	Bıyıklı Mehmet Pasha	Nur-Ali Khalifa †	Ottoman victory
Siege of Diyarbakir	Diyarbakır, Turkey	10 September 1515	Bıyıklı Mehmet Pasha	Ustaclu Kara Khan	Ottoman victory
Siege of Harput (1516)	Elazığ, Turkey	26 March 1516	Karaçin Ahmet Bey	Unknown	Ottoman victory
Battle of Sinjar	Sinjar, Iraq	Spring 1516	Seyyid Ahmed Bey	Çuka Sultan	Ottoman victory
Battle of Kerh	Diyarbakır, Turkey	April 1516	Çerkez Hüseyin Bey †	Ustaclu Kara Khan	Safavid victory
Battle of Koçhisar	Mardin, Turkey	May 1516	Bıyıklı Mehmet Pasha	Ustaclu Kara Khan †	Ottoman victory
Battle of Marj Dabiq	Aleppo, Syria	24 August 1516	Selim I	Kansuh al-Ghawri †	Ottoman victory
Siege of Mardin	Mardin, Turkey	March 1517	Bıyıklı Mehmet Pasha	Ustaclu Suleiman Bey †	Ottoman victory
Siege of Hasankeyf (1517)	Batman, Turkey	Spring 1517	Bıyıklı Mehmet Pasha	Sharaf Bey (surrendered) Mehmed Bey (surrendered); Davud Bey (surrendered)	Ottoman victory
Battle of Mosul (1517)	Mosul, Iraq	1517	Bıyıklı Mehmet Pasha	Ahmed Bey Afshar (surrendered)	Ottoman victory

== Sources ==
- Karagoz, Huseyn Mirza (2017). "Alevism in Turkey: Tensions and patterns of migration". In Issa, Tözün (ed.). Alevis in Europe: Voices of Migration, Culture and Identity. Routledge.
- Mikaberidze, Alexander (2015). Historical Dictionary of Georgia (2nd ed.). Rowman & Littlefield. ISBN 978-1442241466.
- Mikhail, Alan (2020). God's Shadow: Sultan Selim, His Ottoman Empire, and the Making of the Modern World. Liveright. ISBN 978-1-631-49239-6.
- Muir, Sir William (1896). The Mameluke; or, Slave dynasty of Egypt, 1260–1517, A. D. Smith, Elder.
- Göyünç, Nejat (1969). Bölüm I (in Turkish). İstanbul Üniversitesi Edebiyat Fakültesi Basımevi. ISBN 975-16-0402-8.
