= Capture of Tabriz (1514) =

Ottoman victory over Safavid Persia

- Part of Ottoman–Persian War (1505–1517)
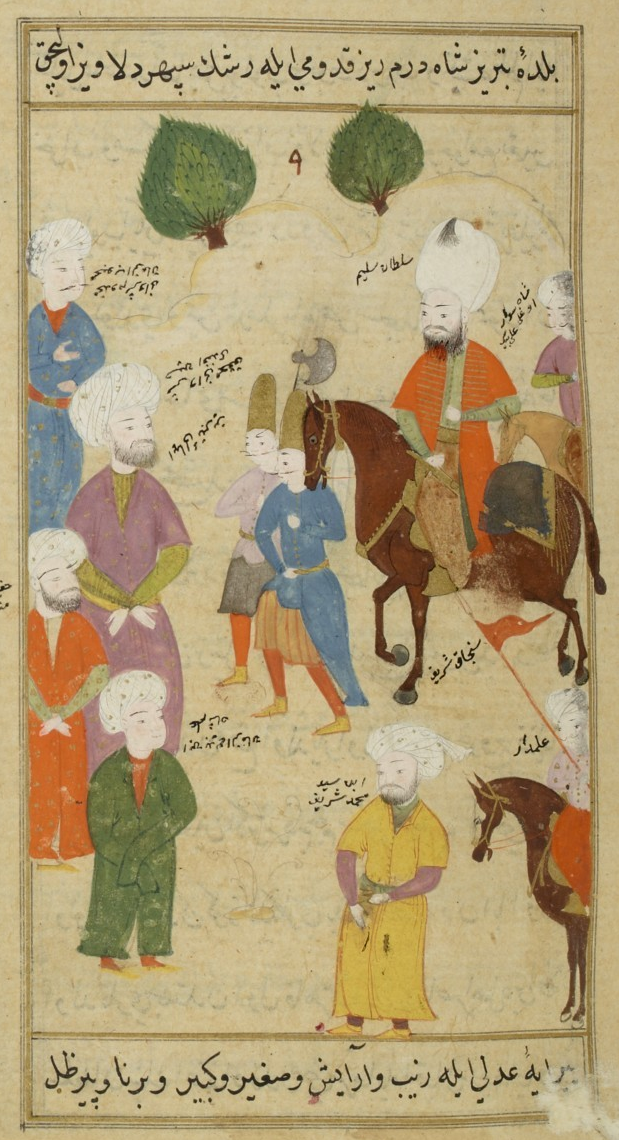
- Selim entering Tabriz
Date	September 1514
Location	Tabriz, Safavid Iran
Result	Ottoman victory
Territorial changes	Tabriz captured by the Ottomans after the Battle of Chaldiran; Fall of the Safavid capital in 1514

Belligerents
Ottoman Empire	Safavid Empire (Ottoman Empire) Forces of Şehzade Murad

Commanders and leaders
(Ottoman Empire) Selim I (Ottoman Empire) Dukaginzade Ahmed Pasha (Ottoman Empire) Piri Çelebi (Ottoman Empire) Idris Bitlisi	(Ottoman Empire) Şehzade Murad

the Capture of Tabriz (1514) was a phase in the Ottoman–Persian War of 1505–1517. The Ottomans, Having inflicted a heavy defeat on the Safavid army under the command of Shah Ismail in the Battle of Chaldiran on 23 August 1514, Ottoman army under the command of Yavuz Sultan Selim continued its forward operations and entered the Safavid capital Tabriz on 6 September 1514.

== Capture of Tabriz ==
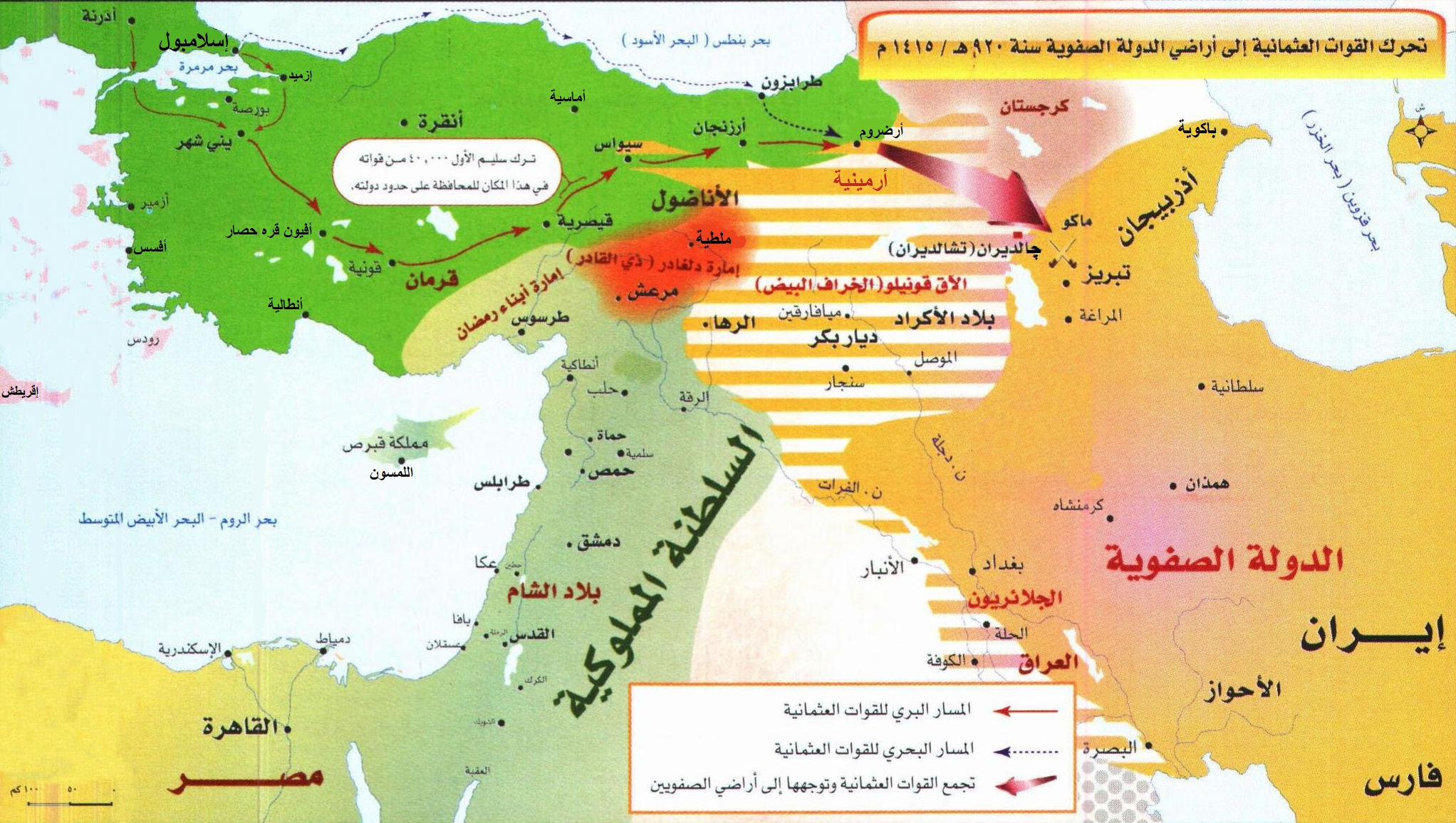
The Progress of the Ottoman Army in the 1514 Iran Campaign

The Ottoman army under the command of Yavuz Sultan Selim advanced towards Tabriz on 25 August 1514, after the Chaldiran victory.

Dukaginoğlu Ahmet Pasha, Defterdar Piri Çelebi and (chronicler) İdris-i Bitlisî were sent to Tabriz as a vanguard with a reserve unit. This vanguard unit took over the city and preparations were started to welcome it. The people of Tabriz covered the road with shawls and precious fabrics until Surhab outside Tabriz. The soldiers and the people lined up on the route applauded Yavuz Sultan Selim and the Ottoman army who entered the city on 6 September 1514.

On Friday 8 September 1514, the Friday greeting was performed at the Sultan Yakub Mosque (in some sources, at the Hasan Han Mosque) and a sermon was read in the name of Yavuz Sultan Selim. Selim also ordered the repair of mosques that had been ruined due to neglect.

On 12 September some 1000 scientists and artists began to be sent from Tabriz to Istanbul. On 15 September, the Ottoman army left Tabriz and advanced towards Karabakh. The Janissaries, who opposed the idea of Yavuz Sultan Selim staying in Tabriz, also rebelled against the idea of Selim wintering in Karabakh and then marching on Iran again during the following campaign season (sources record that the Janissaries shouted around the Sultan by attaching their torn shoes and clothes to the tips of their spears, and even fired bullets into the Sultan's tent).
