= Battle of Koçhisar =

1516 battle

- Part of Ottoman–Persian War (1505–1517)
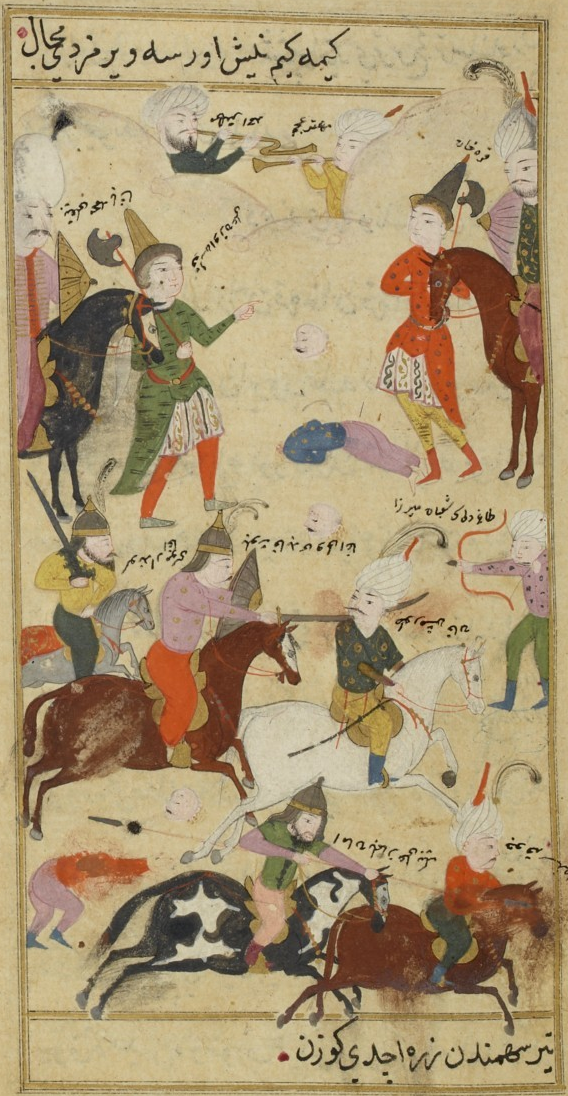
Date	1516
Location	Mardin, Kızıltepe
Result	Ottoman victory: After Mardin, Urfa was annexed by the Ottomans.

Belligerents
Ottoman Empire	Safavid Iran

Commanders and leaders
Bıyıklı Mehmed Pasha; Deli Husrev Pasha; Karaçin Ahmed Bey; Pir Hüseyin Beg; Idris Bitlisi; Halil Eyyubi; Çavuş Ahmed Beg; Atak Ahmed Beg	Karahan Ustaculı †; Kangırıl Sultan; Çuka Sultan †; Velihan Beg †; Yegan Beg †; Hüseyin Beg; Saru Beg †; Durmuş Beg

Strength
20,000	At least 12,000

Casualties and losses
500	10,000

The Battle of Koçhisar took place in May 1516 at the DedeKargın location near Mardin Kızıltepe, between Ottoman army under the command of Bıyıklı Mehmed Pasha and the Safavid army under the command of Ustaclu Kara Han.

== Before the battle ==
=== Ottomans ===
In the center were 2,000 Janissaries with rifles and Bıyıklı Mehmet Pasha with his artillery. On the right wing were 6,000 Sipahis and Karaman Governor Hüsrev Pasha. On the left wing were 4,000 to 6,000, mostly irregular Kurdish cavalry. The plan was to defend against the Safavid cavalry with firepower, as in the Battle of Chaldıran, and then counterattack with cavalry after the enemy's formation was broken.

=== Safavids ===
Ustaclu Kara Han divided his army into two and took the left wing himself. He gave the Baghdad Governor Kangırıl Sultan to the right wing. Realizing that he would not be able to face the Ottoman artillery and the Janissaries with rifles, Kara Han intended to repel the wing cavalry and take the center in a pincer.
