= Khusrawiyya Mosque =

Former mosque in Aleppo, Syria

- جَامِع الْخُسْرَوِيَّة
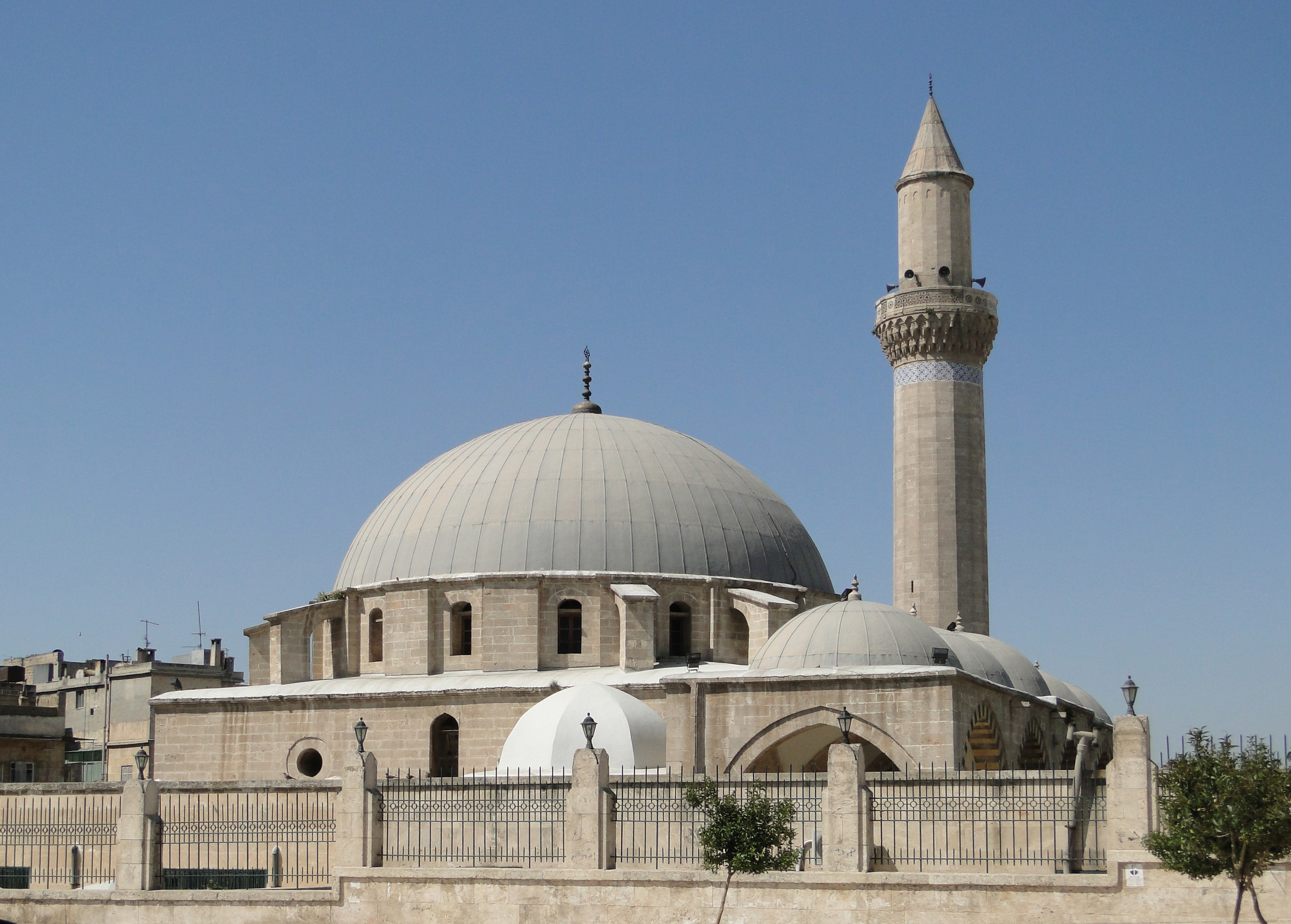
- The mosque in 2010, prior to its destruction

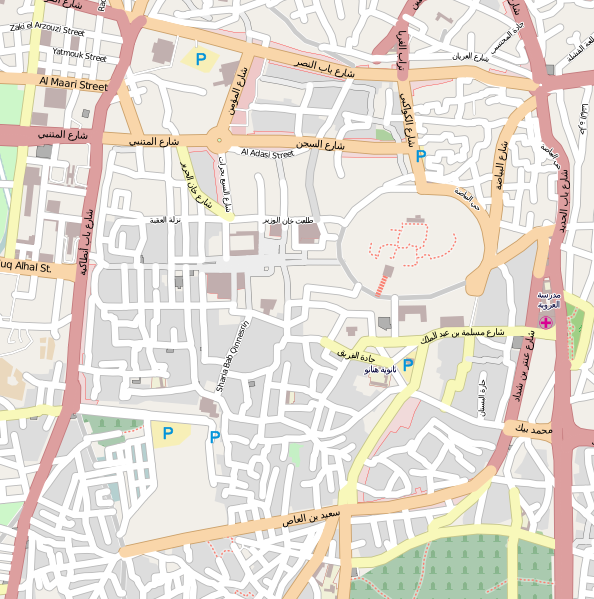
- Location of the destroyed mosque in the Ancient City of Aleppo

Religion
- Affiliation: Islam (former)
- Ecclesiastical or organisational status: Mosque (1547–2014); Madrasa; Mausoleum
- Status: Destroyed (in 2014)

Location
- Location: Aleppo
- Country: Syria
- Interactive map of Khusrawiyya Mosque
- Coordinates: 36°11′49″N 37°09′38″E

Architecture
- Architect: Mimar Sinan
- Type: Islamic architecture
- Style: Ottoman
- Founder: Deli Husrev Pasha
- Completed: 1547 CE
- Destroyed: August 2014 (in the Battle of Aleppo)

Specifications
- Dome: 1
- Minaret: 1
- Materials: Stone
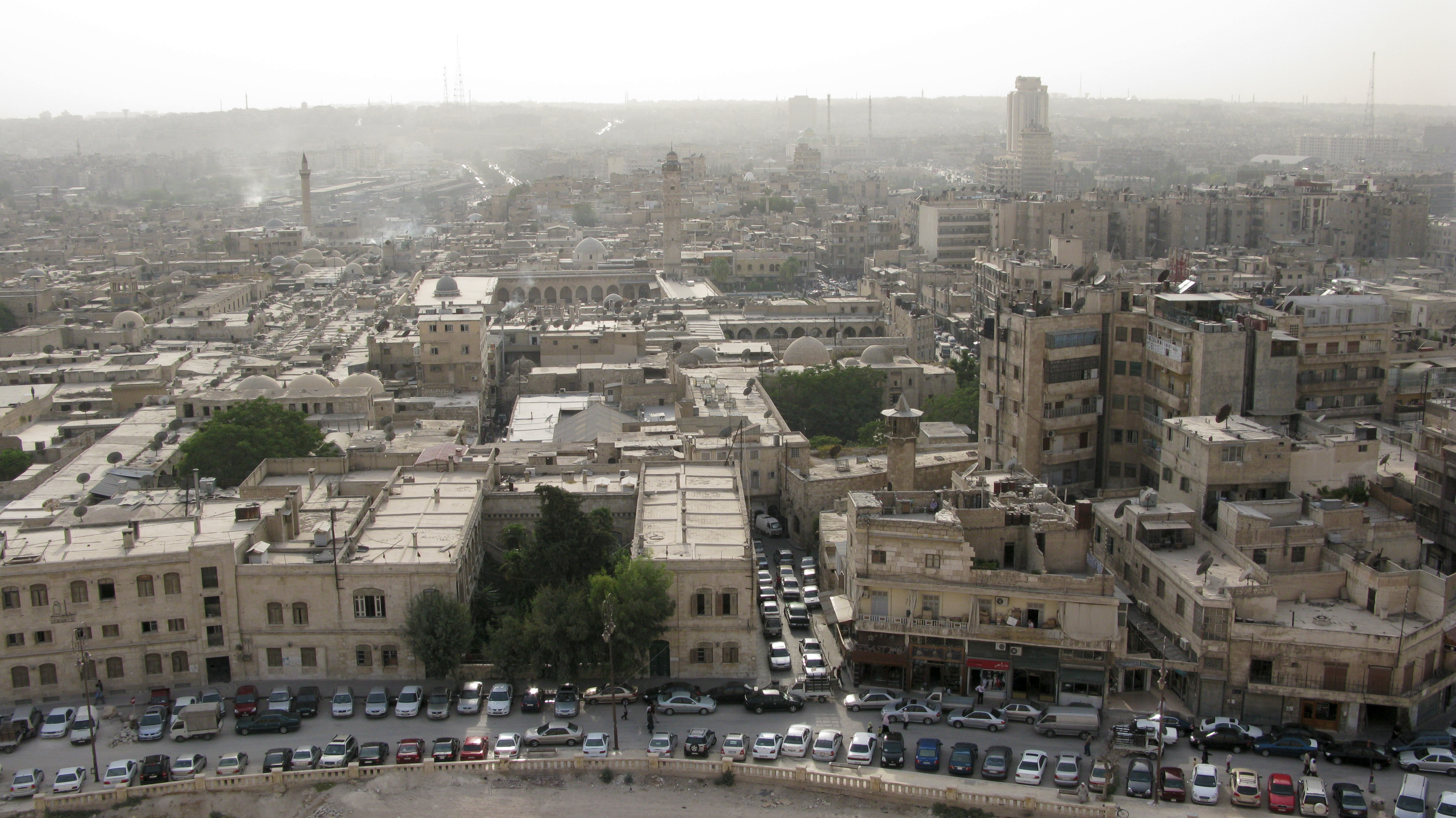
- Ancient Aleppo

UNESCO World Heritage Site
- Official name: Ancient City of Aleppo
- Location: Aleppo, Syria
- Includes: Citadel of Aleppo, Al-Madina Souq
- Criteria: Cultural: (iii), (iv)
- Reference: 21
- Inscription: 1986 (10th Session)
- Endangered: 2013–2020
- Area: 364 ha (1.41 sq mi)

The Khusrawiyya Mosque (Arabic: جَامِع الْخُسْرَوِيَّة, romanized: Jāmiʿ al-Ḵusrawiyya), also known as the Khusraw Mosque, was a mosque complex in Aleppo, Syria. It was located southeast of the Citadel, in the Ancient City of Aleppo, a World Heritage Site. The mosque was commissioned by Husrev Pasha while he was governor of Aleppo under Sultan Suleiman I.

The mosque, which was left neglected during the Syrian Civil War was completely destroyed during the Battle of Aleppo in August 2014 with dynamites.

== Architecture ==
The complex consisted of a mosque, a madrasa, rooms for travellers, a public kitchen, shops and other facilities. The Khusrawiyya complex was designed by the renowned court architect Mimar Sinan.

== Gallery ==
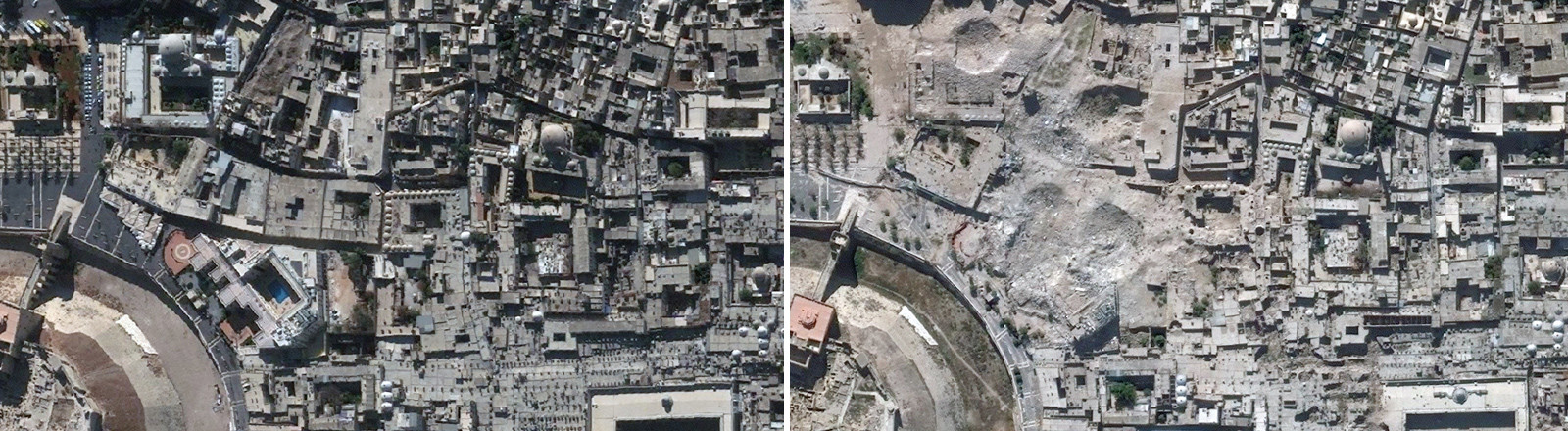
Side-by-side satellite image of Aleppo, 2010 and 2014, showing destruction of the mosque complex, top right. (Source: US Department of State, Humanitarian Information Unit, 2014.)

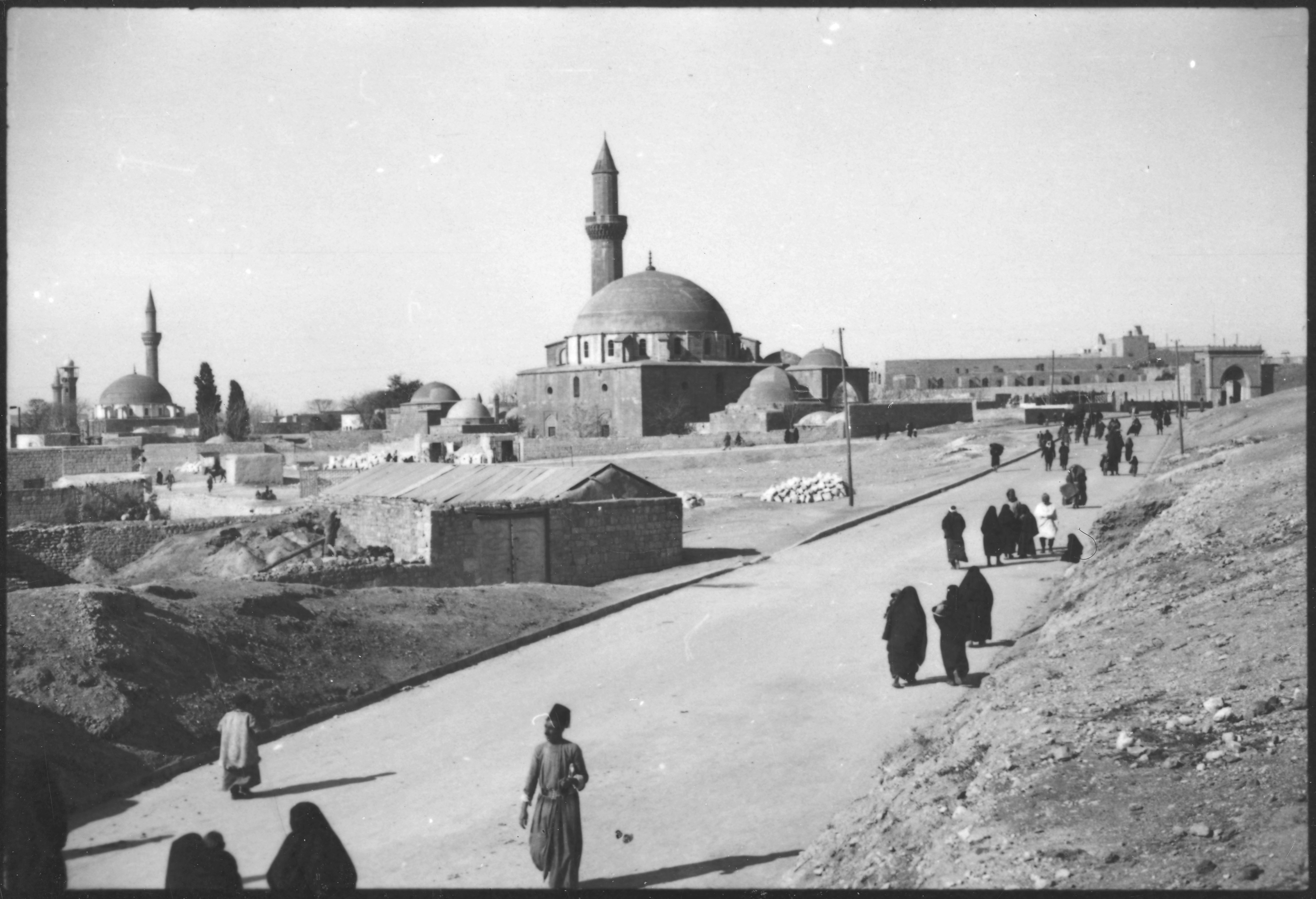
The mosque in c. 1933

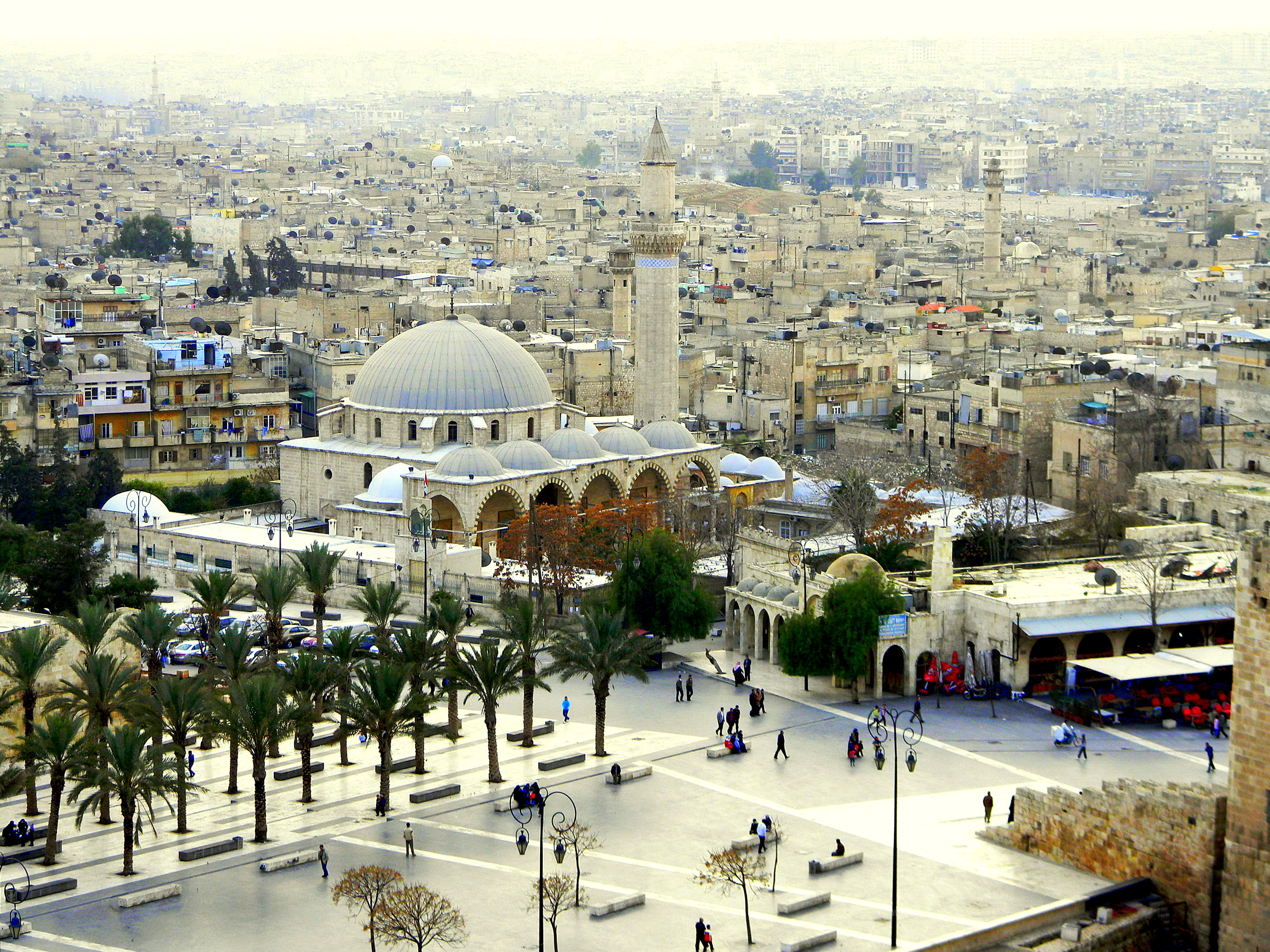
View from the Citadel in 2011

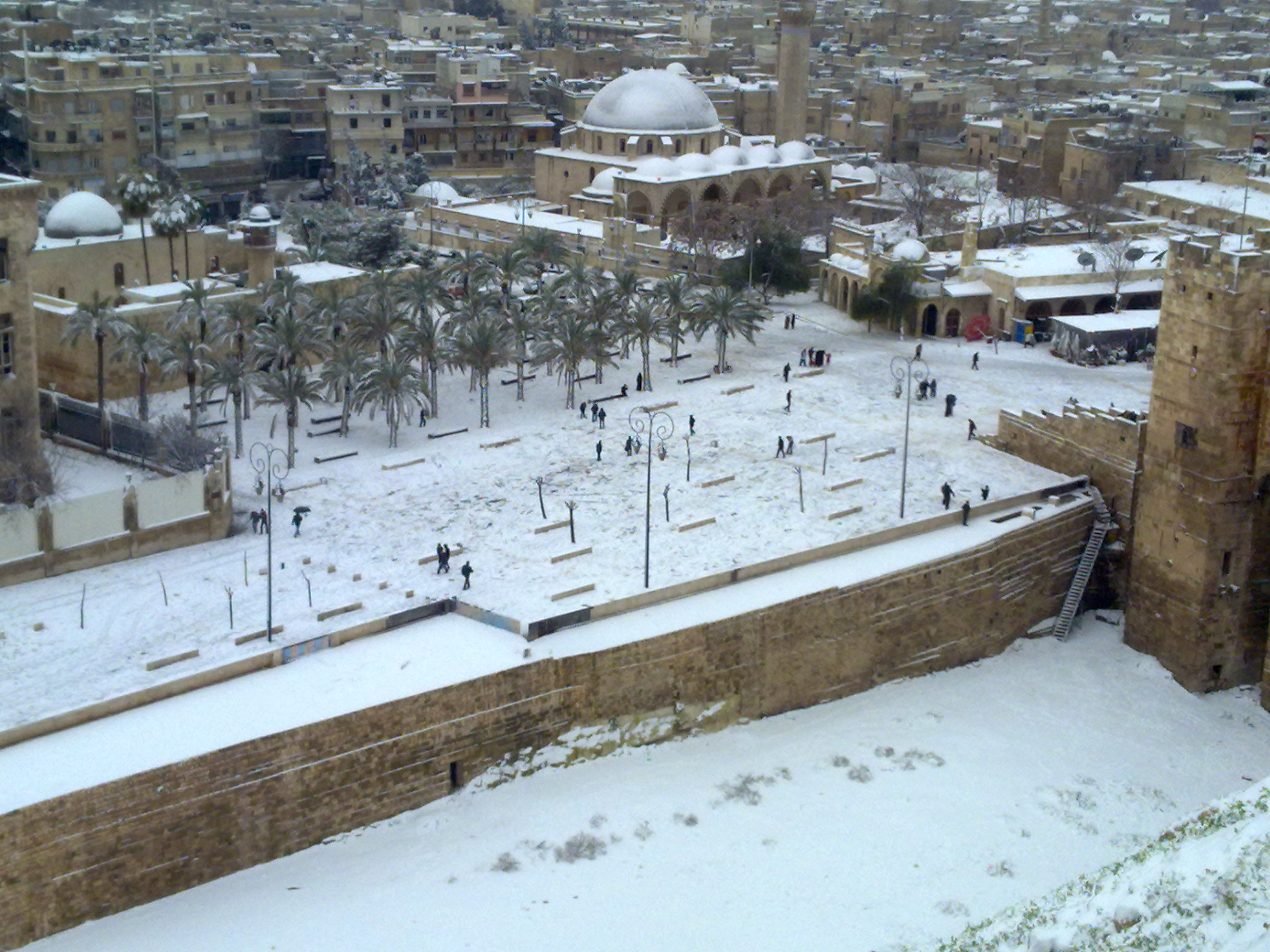
Winter 2012

== See also ==
- Islam in Syria
- List of mosques in Aleppo
- List of mosques in Syria

== Sources ==
- de Laet, Sigfried J.; Dani, Ahmad Hasan; Lorenzo, José Luis (1994). History of Humanity.
- Watenpaugh, Keith David (2014). Being Modern the Middle East.
