= Acheh Soltan Qajar =

Safavid governor of Urfa

Qadurmish Khan Acheh Soltan Qajar
- آچه سلطان قاجار

Governor of Urfa
- In office 1514–1517
- Monarch: Ismail I
- Preceded by: ?
- Succeeded by: Ottoman Rule

Personal details
- Tribe: Qajar

Military service
- Allegiance: Safavid Iran
- Battles/wars: Ottoman–Persian War (1505–1517)

Acheh Soltan Qajar was a Turkoman military officer from the Qajar tribe, who served as the Safavid governor of Urfa (also known as Orfah, Orufah, or Orufah-ye Diyarbekr) from 1514 to 1517.

On his appointment as governor, Acheh Soltan was given the honorary name Qadurmish Khan, as he had been responsible for killing Morad Mirza of the Ak Koyunlu, Ismail I's rival.

Acheh Soltan Qajar is apparently one of the only two attested individuals from the Qajar tribe (the other one being Piri Beg Qajar) who held stature during the reign of Ismail I. Nevertheless, neither Acheh Soltan nor Piri Beg were leading amirs "in the sense of holding high office in the early Safavid administration".

== Sources ==
- Daniel, Elton L., ed. (2002). Society and Culture in Qajar Iran: Studies in Honor of Hafez Farmayan. Costa Mesa, California: Mazda Publishers. ISBN 978-1568591384.
- Floor, Willem M. (2008). Titles and Emoluments in Safavid Iran: A Third Manual of Safavid Administration, by Mirza Naqi Nasiri. Washington, DC: Mage Publishers. ISBN 978-1933823232.

Preceded by ?	Governor of Urfa; 1514 – 1517	Succeeded by Ottoman rule
