= Battle of Ovacık (1515) =

16th century battle between Ottomans and Safavids

- Part of Ottoman–Persian War (1505–1517)
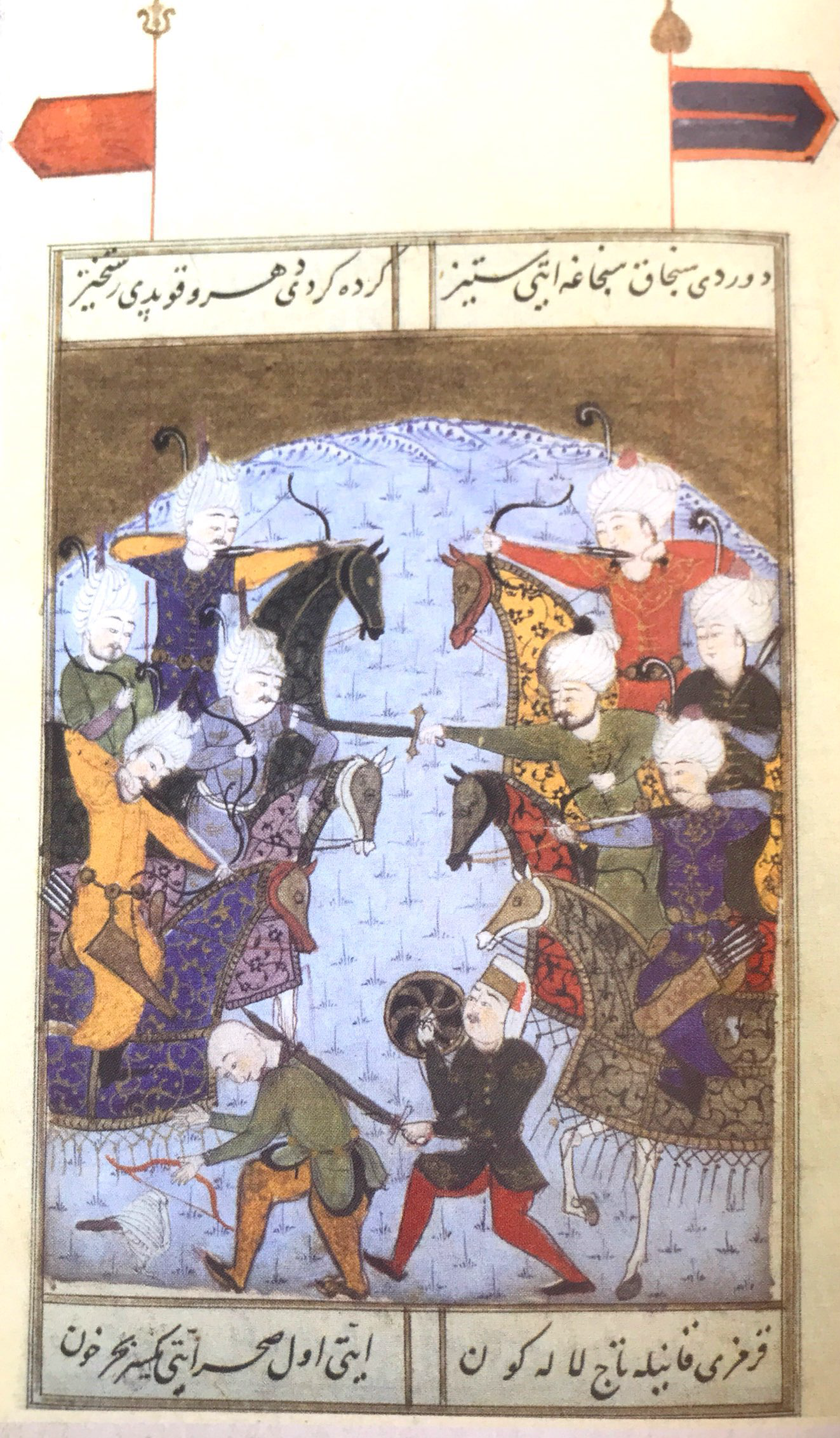
Date	1515
Location	Tunceli, Ovacık
Result	Ottoman victory

Belligerents
Ottoman Empire	Safavid Iran

Commanders and leaders
Bıyıklı Mehmed Pasha; Hüseyin Bey	Nur Ali Khalifa †

Strength
10,000	800

The Battle of Ovacık took place between the Ottoman army under the command of Bıyıklı Mehmed Pasha and the Safavid army under the command of Nur Ali Khalifa, and ended the life of Nur Ali along with the rebellion.

== Battle ==
When Nur Ali Khalifa first entered Çemişgezek, the local ruler of the region, Rüstem Bey, did not resist Shah Ismail's forces and swore allegiance. Rüstem Bey, who fought against Yavuz in Chaldıran, sought refuge with the Ottoman Sultan after the battle, but his request was not accepted and he was executed. His son Hüseyin Bey's request for asylum was accepted and he was ordered to join Bıyıklı Mehmet Pasha with his forces.

The Safavid army, learning that Bıyıklı Mehmet Pasha was approaching them, decided to confront him despite their surprise. The two armies met on the Tekir plateau of Ovacık in mid-June. In the fierce battle, the Safavid attacks against superior firepower did not yield any results.

The Safavid army, which suffered heavy losses, began to disperse when they saw Nur Ali's lifeless head hanging.

The Ottoman army, which acted with discipline, almost destroyed the Safavid army.

== After ==
The death of Nur Ali and the disintegration of the Safavid army in the region opened the gates of Tunceli to the Ottoman army. In a short time, some of the surrounding castles fell and some surrendered. The conquered region was turned into a privileged sanjak and was assigned to Hüseyin Bey, the homeland of his ancestors.

Bıyıklı Mehmet Pasha, who successfully completed the expedition and ended Nur Ali Caliph and his rebellion, which had been wreaking havoc in Eastern Anatolia for three years; restored order and moved to Bayburt with his army. While all this was happening, the people of Diyarbakır turned their backs on the Safavid State and asked for help from the Ottoman Sultan.

Shah Ismail, on the other hand, could not tolerate this as he had completely lost his control in Eastern Anatolia and sent an army under the command of Ustaclu Kara Han, the brother of the former Governor of Diyarbakır, to Diyarbakır.
