= Şehzade Murad (son of Şehzade Ahmed) =

Ottoman prince (1495–1519)

- Born: 1495
- Died: 16 October 1519 (aged 23–24)
- Issue: Şehzade Mustafa; Şehzade Mehmed; Asitanşah Sultan
- Dynasty: Ottoman
- Father: Şehzade Ahmed

Şehzade Murad (Ottoman Turkish: شہزادہ مراد; 1495 Amasya – c. 16 October 1519, Kashan or Isfahan) was an Ottoman prince (şehzade), a son of Şehzade Ahmed and a grandson of Sultan Bayezid II. He was involved in the chaos that surrounded the succession to Sultan Bayezid II (r. 1481–1512).

Murad's father, Ahmed, had fought against his half-brother Şehzade Selim (later Selim I) for their father throne; during this struggle, Ahmed received support from Shah Ismail I (r. 1501–1524) of the neighboring Safavid Empire. When Ahmed was put to death by the victorious Selim, Şehzade Murad was subsequently given support by Ismail I as claimant to the throne. Ismail I wanted to use Murad to mobilize opposition against Selim. In 1512, during Nur-Ali Khalifa's large-scale campaign in Anatolia, Murad joined his campaign, and even "girded the Qizilbash crown". According to information Selim received from his spies (December 1512/January 1513), Ismail I allegedly wanted to conquer Anatolia, give the Rum beylerbeylik to Murad, while the rest of the territory would be ruled by the Qizilbash. However, when the Safavid support meant for Murad failed to materialize, the scheme was abandoned, and Murad migrated to the Safavid Empire where he was given asylum. He died of natural causes on 16 October 1519, at Kashan, or Isfahan.

Ismail I's support to these rivals of Selim I formed one of the main casus belli that led to the decisive Battle of Chaldiran (1514).

== Issue ==
No concubine of Murad is known, but he had at least two sons and a daughter:

- Şehzade Mustafa (killed by Selim I, 14 May 1513, Amasya)
- Şehzade Mehmed (killed by Selim I, September or October 1512, Amasya)
- Asitanşah Sultan

== Sources ==
- McCaffrey, Michael J. (1990). "ČĀLDERĀN". Encyclopaedia Iranica, Vol. IV, Fasc. 6. pp. 656–658.
- Savory, Roger; Karamustafa, Ahmet T. (1998). "ESMĀʿĪL I ṢAFAWĪ". Encyclopaedia Iranica, Vol. VIII, Fasc. 6. pp. 628–636.
- Savory, Roger (2007). Iran Under the Safavids. Cambridge: Cambridge University Press. ISBN 978-0521042512.
- Faroqhi, Suraiya; Fleet, Kate, eds. (2012). The Cambridge History of Turkey (Vol. 2): The Ottoman Empire as World Power, 1453-1603. Cambridge: Cambridge University Press. pp. 1–723. ISBN 978-1316175545.
