= Bıyıklı Mehmed Pasha =

Ottoman military commander and governor

Fatih (Conqueror) Mehmed Pasha
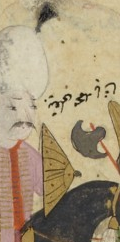

Ottoman Governor of Diyarbekir
- In office 4 November 1515 – 24 December 1521
- Monarchs: Selim I Suleyman I
- Preceded by: Position established
- Succeeded by: Divane Hüsrev Pasha

Governor of Trebizond Sanjak
- In office 1514 – 23 October 1514
- Monarch: Selim I
- Preceded by: Sunguroglu Ahmed Pasha
- Succeeded by: Mirza Mehmed Bey

Personal details
- Died: 24 December 1521 Diyarbekir Eyalet, Ottoman Empire
- Children: Mustafa Pasha
- Education: Enderun School

Military service
- Allegiance: Ottoman Empire
- Branch/service: Ottoman Army
- Years of service: Until his death
- Rank: Serdar
- Battles/wars: Ottoman Civil War (1509–1513); Battle of Yenişehir; Ottoman–Persian War (1505–1517); Battle of Chaldiran; Siege of Kiğı (1514); Siege of Bayburt (1514); Siege of Kemah (1515); Battle of Ovacık (1515); Battle of Koçhisar (1516); Siege of Harput (1516); Siege of Mosul (1517); Ottoman–Mamluk War (1516–17); Battle of Marj Dabiq

Bıyıklı Mehmed Pasha (Ottoman Turkish: بیقلی محمد پاشا; died 24 December 1521) known as Fatih Pasha, was an Ottoman serdar and governor of Diyarbakır.

== Early life ==
There is little information about his origin and early life, but there is claim that he was descended from the Turkoman Aq Qoyunlu tribe. He was probably educated in the Enderûn.

== Military career ==
After the Battle of Chaldiran (1514), he commanded the East Front against the Safavids from 1515 to 1521. In this campaign, he captured the Diyarbakır, Mardin, Raqqa, Mosul and other important cities of the Southeastern Anatolia and Northern Mesopotamia regions. He defeated the Safavid army twice in the Battle of Ovacık (1515) and the Battle of Koçhisar (1516). He commanded the Ottoman left flank at the Battle of Marj Dabiq against the Mamluk army. After this battle, he returned to the eastern front to continue his campaign against the Safavids. During his campaign, he became a Vizier Governor of Diyarbakır after the siege and capture of Diyarbakır. He commanded this front until his death in 1521.

Political offices
Preceded by office established	Vizier Governor of the Diyarbakır; 4 October 1515 – 24 December 1521	Succeeded by Divane Husrev Pasha
