= Sayyed Sharif al-Din Ali Shirazi =

16th-century Persian cleric

- شریف الدین علی شیرازی

Sadr
- In office 1508–1510; 1512–1514

Personal details
- Born: 15th century Shiraz, Fars, Safavid Iran
- Died: 23 August 1514 Chaldiran plain, Azerbaijan, Safavid Iran
- Cause of death: In battle at Chaldiran
- Children: Mir Sharif Shirazi
- Relatives: Sharif Jurjani (grandfather)

Sayyed Sharif al-Din Ali Shirazi (Persian: سید شریف الدین علی شیرازی; died 23 August 1514, Chaldiran) was a Persian cleric, who served as sadr in Safavid Iran during 1508–1510 and later from 1512 until his death in the battle of Chaldiran in 1514. He was a grandchild of Sharif Jurjani, and was the father of the prominent bureaucrat and grand vizier, Mir Sharif Shirazi.

== Sources ==
- Newman, Andrew J. (2008). Safavid Iran: Rebirth of a Persian Empire. I.B.Tauris. pp. 1–281. ISBN 9780857716613.
- Mitchell, Colin P. (2009). The Practice of Politics in Safavid Iran: Power, Religion and Rhetoric. I.B.Tauris. pp. 1–304. ISBN 978-0857715883.

Preceded by Qadi Mohammad Kashani	Sadr; 1508–1510	Unknown
Unknown	Sadr; 1512–1514	Unknown
