= Sorkheh Lijeh =

Sorkheh Lijeh سرخه ليجه
- Village
- Location within Iran
- Coordinates: 33°43′11″N 47°03′59″E
- Country: Iran
- Province: Ilam
- County: Chardavol
- Bakhsh: Helilan
- Rural District: Helilan

Population (2006)
  - Total: 234
- Time zone: UTC+3:30 (IRST)
  - Summer (DST): UTC+4:30 (IRDT)

Sorkheh Lijeh (Persian: سرخه ليجه, also Romanized as Sorkheh Lījeh; also known as Kazābād and Sar Khalījeh) is a village in Helilan Rural District, Helilan District, Chardavol County, Ilam Province, Iran. At the 2006 census, its population was 234, in 54 families. The village is populated by Kurds.
