= Battle of Sinjar =

Battle of Sinjar may refer to a number of events which took place in the vicinity of Sinjar, northern Iraq, in the 2014-2015 timeframe:

- Sinjar massacre, the massacre of 5,000 Yazidi men in the Sinjar District in August 2014
- December 2014 Sinjar offensive
- November 2015 Sinjar offensive
