= Nur-Ali Khalifa =

16th-century Safavid military officer

Governor of Erzincan
- In office c. 1511–1515
- Monarch: Ismail I
- Preceded by: ?
- Succeeded by: Ottoman rule

Personal details
- Died: Ovacık District, Tunceli
- Occupation: Military leader, official

Military service
- Allegiance: Safavid Iran
- Battles/wars: Ottoman–Persian War (1505–1517); Battle of Chaldiran; Nur Ali Khalifa rebellion; Battle of Ovacık (1515) †

Nur-Ali Khalifa, also known as Nur-Ali Khalifa Rumlu (Persian: نورعلی خلیفه روملو), was an early 16th-century Iranian military leader and official from the Turkoman Rumlu tribe. He served as the governor of Erzincan from c. 1511 to 1515 during the reign of Safavid Shah Ismail I (r. 1501–1524).

Nur-Ali Khalifa was a pivotal figure in the early days of the Safavid Empire. His large-scale campaign in Anatolia in 1512, with troops levied on the spot from Sufis belonging to the Safavid order and which coincided with the ascension of Selim I (r. 1512–1520) to the throne, was one of the casus belli that led to the Battle of Chaldiran (1514). This Safavid force led by Nur-Ali Khalifa penetrated deep into Anatolia, captured and sacked the town of Tokat, had the khotbeh read there in Ismail I's name, and managed to defeat an Ottoman army led by Sinan Pasha that was sent after them.

During the decisive Chaldiran battle, Nur-Ali Khalifa and Mohammad Khan Ustajlu were Ismail I's (r. 1501–1524) commanders who had first-hand experience with the Ottoman ways of warfare. They both advised to attack at once, in order to prevent the Ottoman's from establishing their proper defensive positions, but were rudely rebuffed by Durmish Khan Shamlu. Durmish Khan considered it "cowardly to engage an unprepared enemy". Ismail I chose to endorse Durmish Khan Shamlu's suggestion for the attack and thus the Ottomans were allowed to prepare their defenses at their leisure; this would prove costly, contributing to the sound Safavid defeat at Chaldiran.

== Sources ==
- McCaffrey, Michael J. (1990). "Čālderān". In Yarshater, Ehsan (ed.). Encyclopædia Iranica. Vol. IV/6: Burial II–Calendars II. London and New York: Routledge & Kegan Paul. pp. 656–658. ISBN 978-0-71009-129-1.
- Floor, Willem M. (2008). Titles and Emoluments in Safavid Iran: A Third Manual of Safavid Administration, by Mirza Naqi Nasiri. Washington, DC: Mage Publishers. ISBN 978-1933823232.
- Savory, Roger; Karamustafa, Ahmet T. (1998). "EsmāʿĪl I Ṣafawī". In Yarshater, Ehsan (ed.). Encyclopædia Iranica. Vol. VIII/6: Eršād al-zerāʿa–Eʿteżād-al-Salṭana. London and New York: Routledge & Kegan Paul. pp. 628–636. ISBN 978-1-56859-055-4.
- Savory, Roger (2007). Iran Under the Safavids. Cambridge: Cambridge University Press. ISBN 978-0521042512.

Preceded by ?	Governor of Erzincan c. 1511–1515	Succeeded by Ottoman rule
