= Deli Husrev Pasha =

Personal details
- Born: c. 1495 Sanjak of Bosnia, Ottoman Empire
- Died: 1544 (aged 48–49) Constantinople, Ottoman Empire
- Relations: Mustafa Pasha (brother)

Deli Husrev Pasha (Serbo-Croatian: Deli Husrev Paša, Turkish: Deli Hüsrev Paşa, Divane Hüsrev Pasha) (c. 1495 – 1544) was an Ottoman Bosnian statesman from the Sanjak of Bosnia. His epithet "deli" means "crazy" in Ottoman Turkish, which was ascribed to him because of his quick temper.

== Biography ==
He was born in 1495 as one of the early members of the Sokolović family (which would go on to spawn some of the greatest statesmen of the Empire). His exact birthplace is unknown. Some historians place it near the Glasinac Plateau near Sarajevo, while others put it more eastward, to the Podrinje region of Bosnia. His younger brother was Lala Mustafa Pasha.

He was appointed sanjak-bey of Konya in 1516. He participated in the Ottoman–Mamluk War (1516–17) and personally fought in the siege of the city of Harput. He also attended the expedition to Egypt shortly after.

In 1520, he took part in the suppression of the Qizilbash uprising. In 1521, he was appointed beylerbey of the Diyarbekir Eyalet, following the death of its former governor, Sakalli Mehmed Pasha, only to suppress a local rebellion in his eyalet in 1526. During his governorship of the province, he was accused of bribery and even money falsification by an unknown statesman, but the charges were never investigated.

In 1531, a Safavid Empire statesman named Ulama Pasha defected to the Ottomans, however, Husrev was suspicious of his true intentions and had a conflict with him. As a result, he was deposed from his position.

In 1532, he personally came to the Ottoman capital Constantinople and visited Sultan Suleyman bearing gifts with him. The Sultan brought Husrev with him during the military campaign on Austria the same year. Immediately after his return, he was named beylerbey of Aleppo. During his tenure as governor of Aleppo, he commissioned the building of the Khusruwiyah Mosque which is named after him.

In 1534, he became beylerbey of Damascus, and, in 1535 governor of Egypt. During his service in Egypt, the province saw such an economic blossoming that it even became suspicious to some. It is speculated that Husrev Pasha increased local taxes without notifying his superiors, although this too was never proved.

He was named third vizier in 1536/37 and later second vizier in 1538. When the grand vizier Lütfi Pasha was deposed in 1541, Husrev, as second vizier expected the post for himself. He was surprised when the third vizier, Hadım Suleiman Pasha was chosen instead. When the latter died in 1544, Husrev was again expecting to get his post. However, during a divan meeting, he apparently drew a dagger and threatened then-third vizier Rustem Pasha. After the Sultan heard of this, he appointed Rustem Pasha as Grand Vizier instead. Husrev was apparently so disappointed and depressed with being skipped for the post a second time, that he didn't eat or drink for days (some sources even say weeks). As a result, he soon got ill and died.

== Legacy ==
Mimar Sinan erected a tomb for Husrev Pasha in 1545. During his career, Husrev Pasha built several mosques, schools, fountains and other important buildings in the areas he governed, mostly Egypt, Aleppo and Damascus.
