= Idris Bitlisi =

Ottomon civil servant

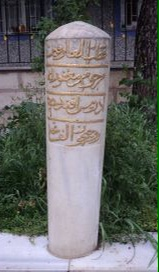
- The tombstone of Idris Bitlisi in Eyüp Sultan
- Born: 18 January 1457; Sulaqan, Ray, Iran
- Died: 15 November 1520 (aged 63); Constantinople (now Istanbul), Ottoman Empire
- Occupations: Historian, Scholar, Administrator

Academic work
- Era: 15th-16th century
- Sub-discipline: Ottoman Empire, Kurdish history
- Notable works: Hasht Bihisht, Selim Şahname

Idris Bitlisi (Persian: ادریس بدلیسی; c. 18 January 1457 – 15 November 1520), sometimes spelled Idris Bidlisi, Idris-i Bitlisi, or Idris-i Bidlisi ("Idris of Bitlis"), and fully Mevlana Hakimeddin İdris Mevlana Hüsameddin Ali-ül Bitlisi (Persian: مولانا حکیم‌الدین ادریس بن حسام‌الدین علی البدلیسی), was an Ottoman Kurdish religious scholar and administrator.

Even though many scholarly works mention Bitlis as Bitlisi's place of birth, a new research states that he was actually born in the district of Sulaqan in Ray in northern Iran.

He wrote a major Ottoman literary work in Persian, named Hasht Bihisht, which began in 1502 and covered the reign of the first eight Ottoman rulers.

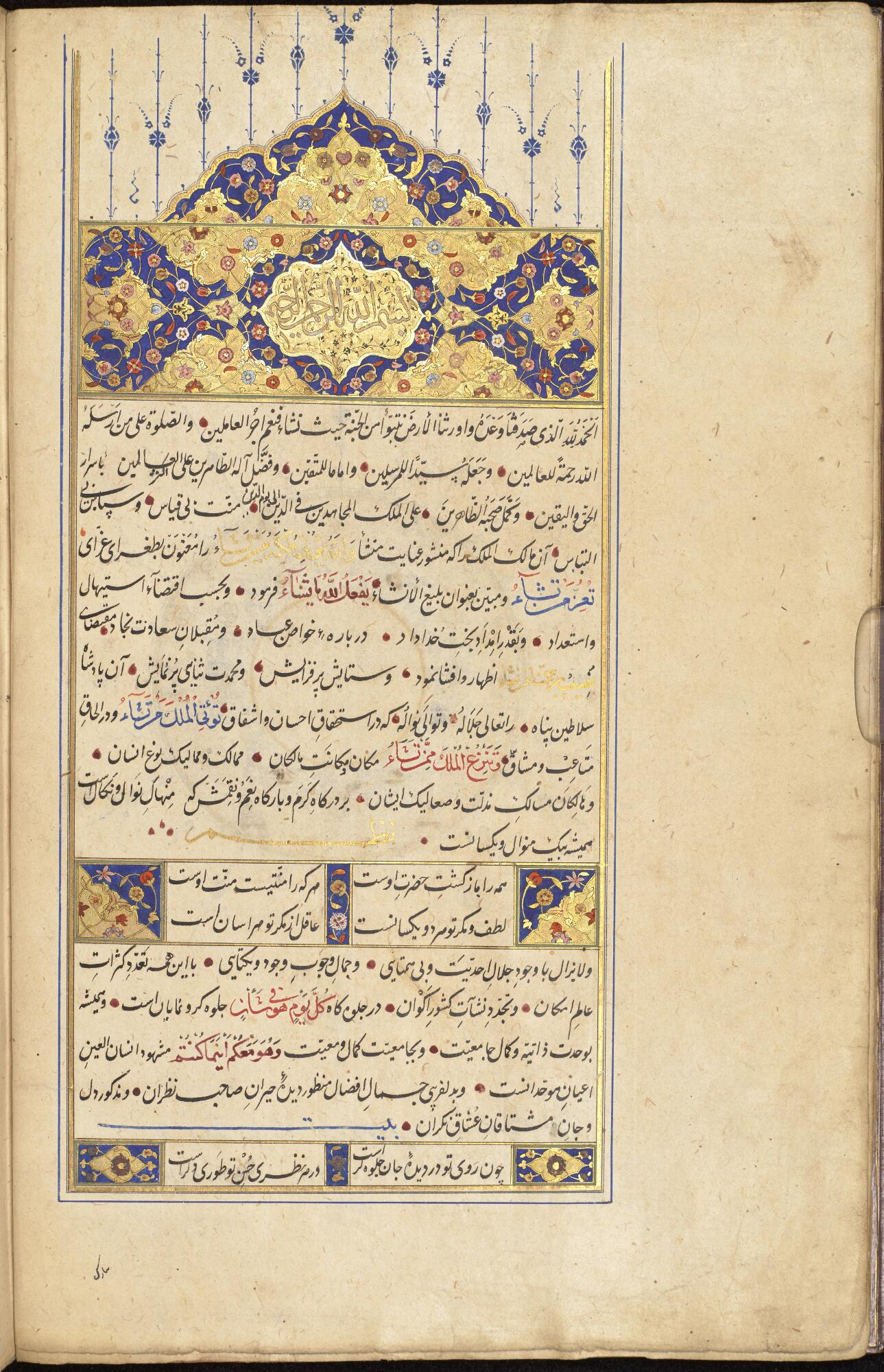
One of the earliest extant copies of Bitlisi's Salīm-Shāhnāmah, completed after 1567 but before 1574. Persian MS 47, John Rylands Library (University of Manchester)

== Biography ==
Bitlisi's father, Hosam al-Din Ali Bitlisi, was a Sufi author strongly affiliated with the Sufi Nurbakhshi sect. Like his father, Idris Bitlisi began his career in the Aq Qoyunlu court, in the service of Yakup Bey, son of Uzun Hasan. He attracted the attention of the Ottoman sultan Selim I and served under him for much of the rest of his life. He joined Selim I in his campaigns against the Mamluks and the Safavids. In 1514 he led the Kurdish forces who captured Diyarbakır from the Safavids. Following the success of the military campaign led by him, he was able to form an alliance between the Kurdish notables and the Ottoman Empire. Selim I entrusted Bitlisi to persuade the Kurds to maintain the alliance between the Kurdish notables and the Ottoman Empire by delivering him with an exceptional authority to deposit territories to the Kurdish notables within the Ottoman Empire to govern over them with an extended autonomy. Bitlisi also assisted the sultan in establishing an Ottoman administration in Egypt, now the Egypt Eyalet (province) of the Ottoman Empire, after its conquest in 1517. He was appointed to numerous administrative positions of significant responsibility including Kazasker (district supreme administrative judge) of Diyarbekir and Arabia.

Bitlisi was instrumental in the incorporation of the territories of Urfa and Mosul into the Ottoman Empire without a war, and of Mardin after a long siege. He played a key role in driving the Alevi Turkomans from the whole region and the assimilation and Ottomanization of the remaining Sunni Kurds.

He died in Constantinople on 15 November 1520, shortly after the death of his longtime benefactor, Sultan Selim I. Bitlisi was buried in Eyüp neighborhood of Constantinople, in the garden of the complex known as "İdris Köşkü" (Idris Mansion) or "İdris Çeşmesi" (Idris Fountain), built by his wife Zeynep Hatun.

Bitlisi wrote extensively towards the end of his life; his best known work is "Selim Şahname", an epic history of Selim I's reign. Bitlisi's Persian Hasht Bihist (also spelled Hasht Behest or Heşt Behişt) was written making explicit use of the stylistic and organizational models of Persianate historiography. Most of the work's content derives best-known written by earlier Ottoman chroniclers.

Opinions on Idris Bitlisi were divided into two general camps, with one seeing him as a strategist who saved Kurdish tribes and played a role in the Ottoman expansion, and the other seeing him as a traitor who brought the Kurds under Ottoman domination. Uluçay wrote that his legacy alone, whether as a hero or a traitor, was its own topic. Turkish historiography generally considered Idris Bitlisi a great Islamic scholar who served the Ottoman state. Kurdish nationalists were divided on him, as some argued that he had acted in pursuit of national interests and was an early example of national consciousness, and others argued that he failed to serve national interests, or outright betrayed them. His Kurdish critics considered him "a symbol of religious fanaticism, egoism, and betrayal of one's own people." They also criticized his pursuance of Ottoman subjection over sovereignty. Among his Kurdish critics were Nuri Dersimi who denounced him as a "traitor", and Abdullah Öcalan who compared him to later traitors in the independence movement. The PKK also portrayed him as a facilitator of the Turkish colonization project.

== See also ==
- List of Kurdish scholars

== Bibliography ==
- Uğur, Ahmet (1991). İdris-i Bitlisi ve Şükri-i Bitlisi (in Turkish). Kayseri, Turkey: Erciyes Üniversitesi Yayınları. ISBN 978-975-7598-17-6.
- Bayraktar, Mehmet (2006). Kutlu Müderris İdris-i Bitlisi (in Turkish). Istanbul, Turkey: Biyografi Net Yayınları. ISBN 978-975-00394-7-8.
- Kirlangic, Hicabi (2001). Selim Şahname (in Turkish). Ankara, Turkey: Works on Culture Series, Turkish Ministry of Culture. ISBN 975-17-2588-7.
- Yazici, Tahsin (2004). "ḤOSĀM-AL-DIN ʿALI BEDLISI". Encyclopaedia Iranica, Vol. XII, Fasc. 5. p. 490.
