= List of mosques commissioned by the Ottoman dynasty =

The list below contains some of the most important mosques in modern-day Turkey, as well as one in Syria and another in Saudi Arabia, that were commissioned by the members of Ottoman imperial family. Some of these major mosques are also known as a selatin mosque, imperial mosque, or sultanic mosque, meaning a mosque commissioned in the name of the sultan and, in theory, commemorating a military triumph. Some mosques were commissioned by or dedicated to other members of the dynastic family, especially important women such as the mothers or wives of sultans. Usually, only a sultanic mosque or a mosque commissioned by a queen mother (valide) was granted the privilege of having more than one minaret.

== The table ==
In the table below the first column shows the name, the second column shows the location, the third column shows the commissioner, the fourth column shows the architect and the fifth column shows the duration of construction.

Name	Location	Commissioner	Architect	Number of Minarets	Years
Hüdavendigar Mosque	Bursa	Murad I		1	1365–1385
Beyazıt I Mosque	Bursa	Bayezid I		2	1391–1395
Bursa Grand Mosque	Bursa	Bayezid I		2	1396–1400
Eski Mosque (Old Mosque)	Edirne	Süleyman Çelebi (Note: Süleyman Çelebi: A contestant of throne during Ottoman Interregnum); Mehmet I	Haci Alaeddin; Ömer İbrahim	2	1402–1414
Yeşil Mosque (Green Mosque)	Bursa	Mehmet I	Hacı İvaz	2	1419–1421
Muradiye Complex (Note: Turkish: Külliye)	Bursa	Murat II		2	1426
Darül Hadis Mosque	Edirne	Murat II		1	1435
Muradiye Mosque	Edirne	Murat II		1	1435–1436
Üç Şerefeli Mosque	Edirne	Murat II		4	1438–1447
Eyüp Sultan Mosque (Note: Dedicated to Abu Ayyub al-Ansari, one of the earliest followers of Prophet who died during Arabic campaign to Istanbul)	Istanbul	Mehmet II		2	1458
Fatih Mosque	Istanbul	Mehmed II	Atik Sinan	2	1463–1471
Bayezid Complex	Edirne	Bayezid II	Hayrettin	2	1484–1488
Bayezid Complex	Amasya	Şehzade Ahmet (Note: Bayezid's son (when he was a sanjak ruler))		2	1486
Bayezid II Mosque	Istanbul	Bayezid II	Yakup	2	1501–1506
Gülbahar Hatun Mosque (Note: Dedicated to Selim's mother Gülbahar Hatun)	Trabzon	Selim I		1	?–1514
Yavuz Selim Mosque	Istanbul	Selim I-Süleyman I	Alaüddin (Acem Alisi)	2	1520/21–1527/8
Sultan Mosque (Manisa)	Manisa	Hafsa Sultan (Note: Hafsa: Mother of Süleyman I)		2	1522
Şah Sultan Mosque	Istanbul	Şah Sultan (Note: Şah: Daughter of Selim I and Ayşe Hatun)	Mimar Sinan	1	1533
Haseki Sultan Mosque	Istanbul	Hürrem Sultan (Note: Hürrem: Mother of Selim II)	Mimar Sinan	1	1538–1539, complex completed 1551, expanded 1612–13
Şehzade Mosque (Note: Dedicated to Süleyman's son Şehzade Mehmed who died young)	Istanbul	Süleyman I	Mimar Sinan	2	1543–1548
Mihrimah Sultan Mosque (Üsküdar)	Istanbul (Üsküdar)	Mihrimah Sultan (Note: Mihrimah: Daughter of Süleyman I and Hürrem Sultan)	Mimar Sinan	2	1543/4–1548
Süleymaniye Mosque	Istanbul	Süleyman I	Mimar Sinan	4	1548–1559
Sulaymaniyya Takiyya Mosque	Damascus	Süleyman I	Mimar Sinan	2	1559
Rüstem Pasha Mosque	Istanbul	Rüstem Pasha (Note: Rüstem: Husband of Mihrimah Sultan, son-in-law of Süleyman I and Hürrem Sultan)	Mimar Sinan	1	1561–1563
Mihrimah Sultan Mosque (Edirnekapı) (Note: She commissioned two mosques, the first on the Asiatic and the second on the European sides of the Bosphorous)	Istanbul (Edirnekapı)	Mihrimah Sultan	Mimar Sinan	1	c. 1563–1570
Sokollu Mehmet Pasha Mosque	Istanbul (Kadırga)	Ismihan Sultan (Note: Ismihan: Daughter of Selim II and Nurbanu Sultan, wife of grand vizier Sokollu Mehmed Pasha)	Mimar Sinan	1	c. 1556/68–1571/72
Selimiye Mosque	Edirne	Selim II	Mimar Sinan	4	1568–1574
Selimiye Mosque	Karapınar	Selim II	Mimar Sinan	2	1563
Selimiye Mosque	Konya	Selim II	Mimar Sinan (?)	2	1570
Atik Valide Camii (Old Valide Mosque)	Istanbul (Üsküdar)	Nurbanu Sultan (Note: Nurbanu: Mother of Murat III)	Mimar Sinan	2	1571–1583, expanded 1584–85/86
Muradiye Mosque	Manisa	Murat III	Mimar Sinan	2	1583–1586/87, complex completed 1590
Yeni Camii (New Mosque)	Istanbul (Eminönü)	Safiye Sultan (Note: Safiye: Mother of Mehmet III) Turhan Sultan (Note: Turhan Hatice: Mother of Mehmet IV)	Mimar Davut Ağa; Mustafa Ağa Dalgıç Ahmed Çavuş	2	1597–1665
Sultan Ahmet Mosque (Blue Mosque)	Istanbul	Ahmet I	Sedefkar Mehmet Agha	6	1609–1616
Çinili Mosque	Istanbul (Üsküdar)	Kösem Sultan	Koca Kasım Ağa	1	1638–1640
Yeni Valide Camii (New Valide Mosque)	Istanbul (Üsküdar)	Gülnuş Sultan (Note: Gülnuş: Mother of Ahmet III)	Hazerfan Mehmet	2	1708–1710
Nuruosmaniye Mosque	Istanbul	Mahmut I Osman III	Mustafa Ağa; Simon Kalfa	2	1749–1755
Ayazma Mosque	Istanbul	Mustafa III		1	1757–1761
Lâleli Mosque	Istanbul	Mustafa III	Mehmet Tahir Ağa	2	1760–1783
Sultan Mustafa Mosque	Istanbul	Mustafa III		1	1763
Zeynep Sultan Mosque	Istanbul	Zeynep Sultan (Note: Zeynep: Daughter of Ahmet III)	Mehmet Tahir Ağa	1	1769
Beylerbeyi Mosque	Istanbul	Abdülhamit I	Mehmet Tahir Ağa	2	1777–1778
Emirgan Mosque	Istanbul	Abdülhamit I		1	1781
Teşvikiye Mosque	Istanbul	Selim III; Abdülmecit I	Krikor Balyan	1	1794–1854
Selimiye Mosque	Istanbul	Selim III		2	1805
Nusretiye Mosque	Istanbul	Mahmut II	Krikor Balyan	2	1823–1826
Hırka'i Şerif Mosque (Note: Holy Mantle is kept in this mosque)	Istanbul	Abdülmecit I		2	1847–1851
Dolmabahçe Mosque	Istanbul	Abdülmecit I - Bezmiâlem Sultan (Note: Bezmialem: Mother of Abdülmecit)	Garabet Balyan	2	1853–1855
Ortaköy Mosque	Istanbul	Abdülmecit I	Garabet Balyan; Nigoğayos Balyan	2	1854–1856
Pertevniyal Mosque	Istanbul	Pertevniyal Sultan (Note: Pertevniyal: Mother of Abdülaziz)	Montani or Sarkis Balyan	2	1869–1871
Aziziye Mosque (Konya)	Konya	Pertevniyal Sultan		2	1872–1874
Yıldız Hamidiye Mosque	Istanbul	Abdul Hamid II	Sarkis Balyan	1	1884–1886
Anbariya Mosque	Medina	Abdul Hamid II		2	1907–1908

== Mosques on the hills of Istanbul ==
Among those mosques in Istanbul some of them have been built on the traditional seven hills of the city (The numbers refer to the number of the hill.).

1. Sultan Ahmed Mosque
2. Nuruosmaniye Mosque
3. Süleymaniye Mosque
4. Fatih Mosque
5. Yavuz Selim Mosque
6. Mihrimah Sultan Mosque

== Bibliography ==
- Goodwin, Godfrey (1971). A History of Ottoman Architecture. Thames & Hudson. ISBN 0-500-27429-0.
- Necipoğlu, Gülru (2005). The Age of Sinan: Architectural Culture in the Ottoman Empire. London: Reaktion Books. ISBN 978-1-86189-253-9.
- Rüstem, Ünver (2019). Ottoman Baroque: The Architectural Refashioning of Eighteenth-Century Istanbul. Princeton University Press. ISBN 9780691181875.
