= Beyhan Sultan =

Beyhan Sultan may refer to:

- Beyhan Sultan (daughter of Selim I) (1497 –1559), Ottoman princess
- Beyhan Sultan (daughter of Mehmed III), Ottoman princess
- Beyhan Sultan (daughter of Ibrahim) (1645–1700), Ottoman princess
- Beyhan Sultan (daughter of Mustafa III) (1766–1824), Ottoman princess
