= Hatice Sultan (daughter of Selim I) =

Ottoman princess, daughter of Sultan Selim I

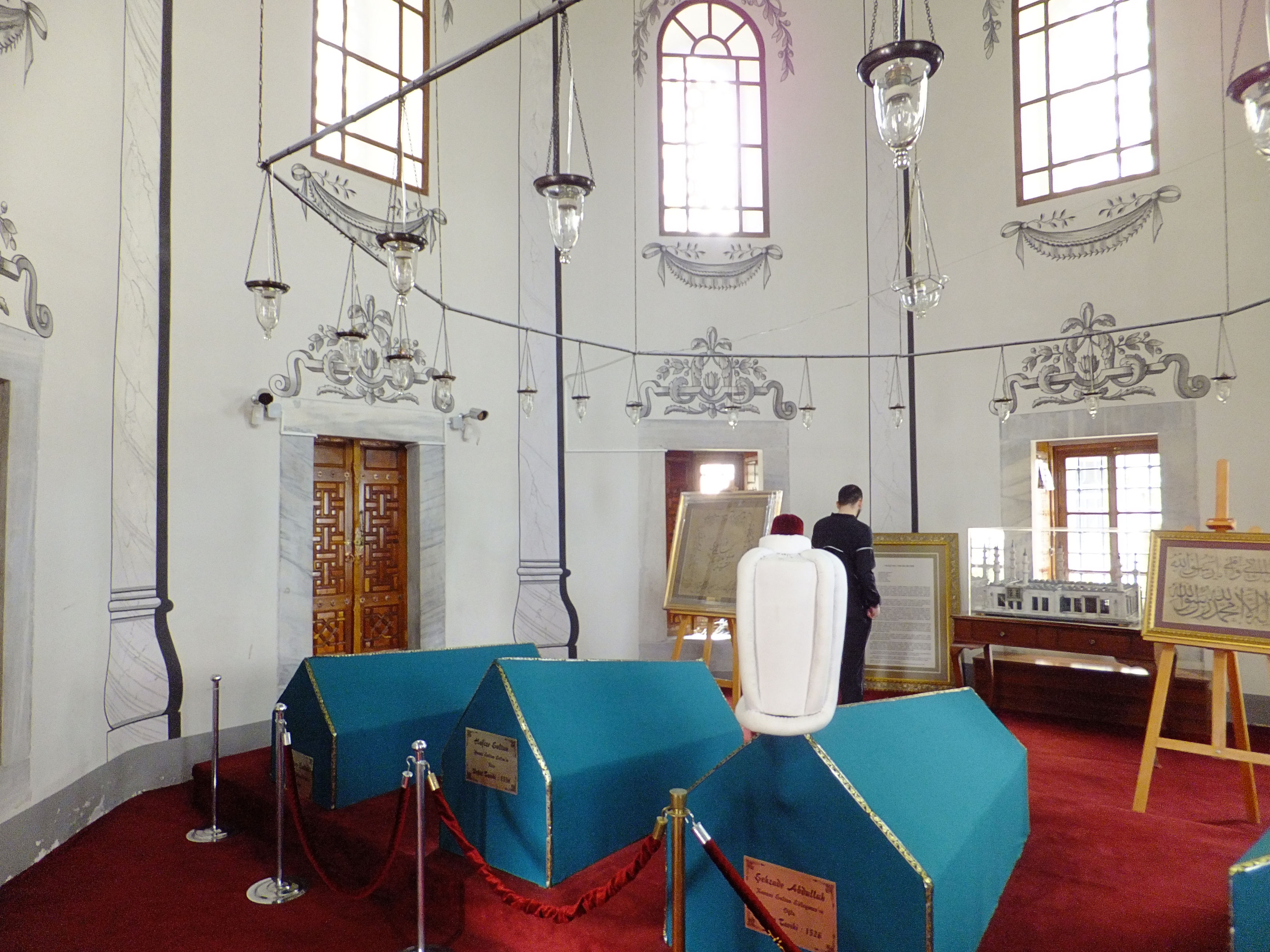
- Hatice Sultan's tomb is located in the Tomb of the Princes (on the left) within the Yavuz Selim Mosque in Istanbul.
- Born: after 1495; Trabzon, Ottoman Empire
- Died: post 1543/44; Constantinople, Ottoman Empire, (now Istanbul, Turkey)
- Burial: Yavuz Selim Mosque, Istanbul
- Spouse: Kapudan Iskender Pasha (m. 1509; died 1515) Çoban Mustafa Pasha (m. 1517; died 1529)
- Issue: First marriage: Sultanzade Mehmed Bey; Sultanzade Süleyman Bey; Sultanzade Ali Bey; Kara Osman Şah Bey; Nefise Hanımsultan; Second marriage; Sultanzade Mehmed Şah Bey; Hanım Hanımsultan; Fülane Hanımsultan
- Dynasty: Ottoman
- Father: Selim I
- Mother: Hafsa Sultan
- Religion: Sunni Islam

Hatice Sultan (Ottoman Turkish: خدیجه سلطان; sometimes called Hatice Hanım Sultan; after 1495 – post 1543/44) was an Ottoman princess, daughter of Sultan Selim I and Hafsa Sultan. She was the sister of Suleiman the Magnificent.

== Biography ==
Hatice's birth date is unknown, but she was born after 1495. She was the daughter of Şehzade Selim (the future Selim I) and his concubine Hafsa Sultan. She married Damat Iskender Pasha in 1509, an Ottoman governor and later admiral who was executed in 1515 Hatice Sultan is believed to have married Çoban Mustafa Pasha in 1517, following the death of her sister, Şahzade Sultan, who had previously been married to Çoban Mustafa Pasha. Although Peçevî states that Kara Osman Şah Bey was the son of Kara Mustafa Pasha (Çoban Mustafa Pasha) (Tarih-i Peçevî, I, p. 45), İsmail Hakkı Uzunçarşılı notes that this was erroneous and that Osman Şah Bey was the son of İskender Pasha, as confirmed by his vakfiye; nevertheless, Peçevî's account preserves an early identification of Osman Şah Bey with Mustafa Pasha's family, which can be considered alongside the evidence concerning Hatice Sultan's later marriage to Çoban Mustafa Pasha.

For a long time, it was believed that Hatice Sultan subsequently married the Grand Vizier Pargalı Ibrahim Pasha. However, research conducted by the historian Ebru Turan in the late 2000s revealed that this claim was not based on solid evidence, and that in fact no such marriage took place between them. As a result, historians now agree that Ibrahim married another woman, Muhsine Hatun, and not Hatice.

Hatice Sultan commissioned the architect Mimar Sinan to build a mosque in her name in Aksaray in 1543–44. The mosque was demolished in the 1950s as part of the urban redevelopment works carried out in Istanbul under the government of Adnan Menderes and has not survived to the present day. She was buried in a separate tomb next to her parents in the Şehzadeler Türbesi, in the graveyard of the Yavuz Sultan Selim Mosque. She was buried next to her sister Hafize Sultan.

== Issue ==
Hatice Sultan had five sons and at least three daughters.

By her first marriage, Hatice had four sons and a daughter:

- Sultanzade Mehmed Bey;
- Sultanzade Süleyman Bey;
- Sultanzade Ali Bey;
- Sultanzade Osman Şah Bey. He commissioned the Osman Shah Mosque;
- Nefise Hanımsultan. Buried in the Şehzade Mosque with at least one of her brothers;

By her second marriage, Hatice had a son and at least two daughters:

- Sultanzade Mehmed Şah Bey;
- Hanım Hanımsultan (died 1582). Buried in Hürrem Sultan's Türbesi;
- Fülane Hanımsultan;

== Depictions in literature and popular culture ==
In the TV series Muhteşem Yüzyıl, Hatice Sultan is played by Turkish-German actress Selma Ergeç.

== Bibliography ==
- Necdet Sakaoğlu, Bu mülkün kadın sultanları: Vâlide sultanlar, hâtunlar, hasekiler, kadınefendiler, sultanefendiler, Oğlak Yayıncılık, 2008
- Leslie Peirce, The Imperial Harem: Women and Sovereignty in the Ottoman Empire, Oxford University Press, Oxford, 1993
- Ebru Turan, The Marriage of Ibrahim Pasha (ca. 1495–1536): The Rise of Sultan Süleyman's Favorite to the Grand Vizierate and the Politics of the Elites in the Early Sixteenth-Century Ottoman Empire, Turcica, 2009

== See also ==
- Ottoman family tree
- Ottoman Emperors family tree (simplified)
