= Sultan Mosque, Manisa =

Mosque in Manisa, Turkey

Sultan Mosque
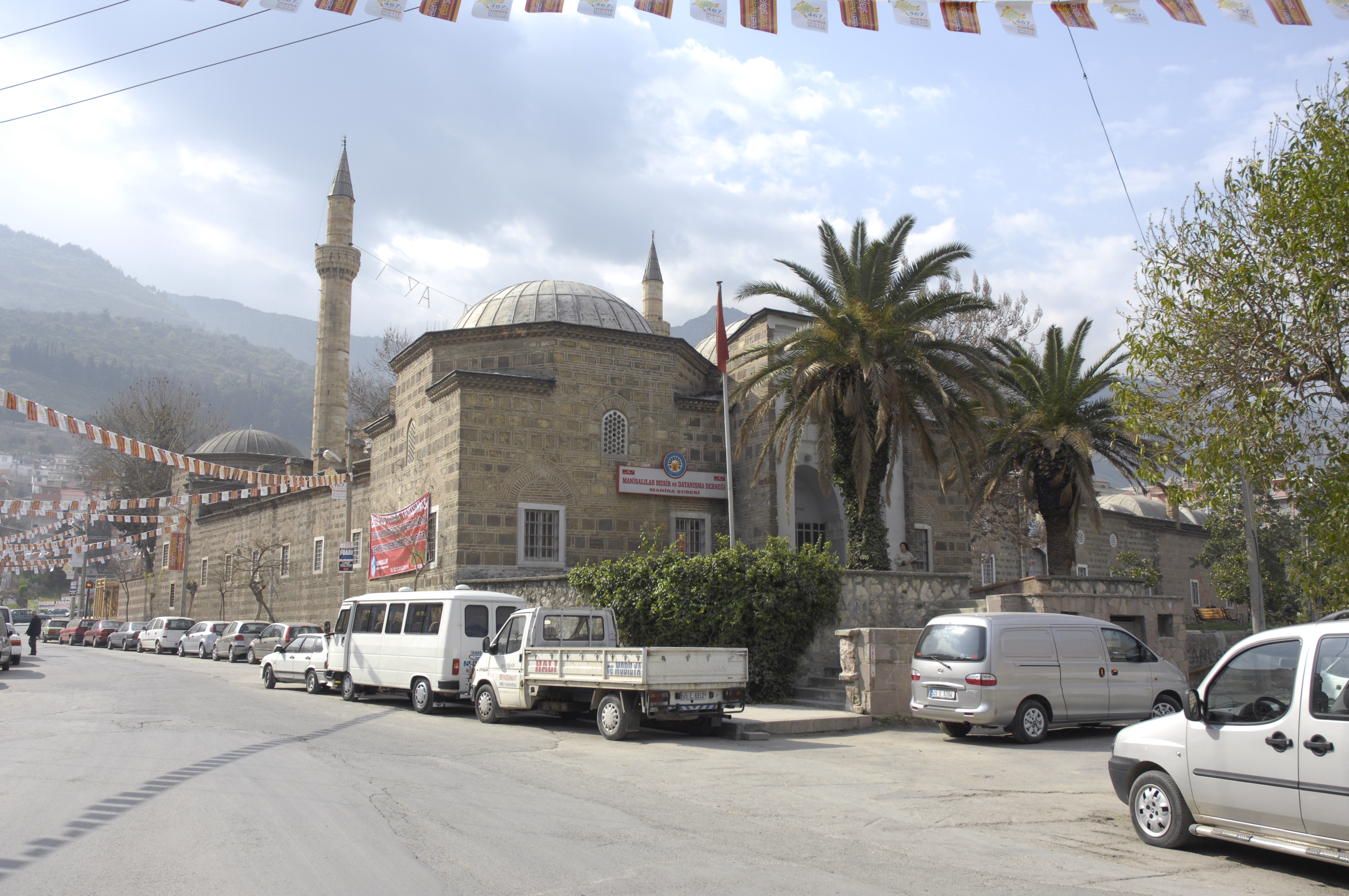

Religion
- Affiliation: Islam

Location
- Location: Manisa, Turkey
- Interactive map of Sultan Mosque
- Coordinates: 38°36′38.3″N 27°25′38.3″E

Architecture
- Type: Mosque
- Style: Islamic, Ottoman architecture
- Completed: 1522
- Minaret: 2

Sultan Mosque also called Hafsa Sultan Mosque is a 16th-century Ottoman mosque in Manisa, Turkey.

== Mosque ==
The mosque and the adjoining religious complex (külliye) were built in Manisa by Hafsa Sultan, the wife of Sultan Selim I and mother of Suleiman the Magnificent, in 1522. The mosque complex consists of the mosque, a madrasa, a hospice, an elementary school, a double bath, and a hospital. The mosque is covered by one central dome and has two minarets.

== Sources ==
- Necipoğlu, Gülru (2005). The Age of Sinan: Architectural Culture in the Ottoman Empire. London: Reaktion Books. ISBN 978-1-86189-253-9.
