= Beyhan Sultan (daughter of Selim I) =

Ottoman princess, daughter of Sultan Selim I

- Born: ante 1494; Trabzon, Ottoman Empire
- Died: 1559; Skopje
- Burial: Yavuz Selim Mosque, Istanbul
- Spouse: Ferhad Pasha (m. 1513; died 1524)
- Issue: Esmehan Hanımsultan; Another child
- Dynasty: Ottoman
- Father: Selim I
- Mother: Hafsa Sultan
- Religion: Sunni Islam

Beyhan Sultan (Ottoman Turkish: بیخان سلطان; ante 1494 – 1559), also known as Peykhan Sultan, was an Ottoman princess, daughter of Selim I and Hafsa Sultan. She was the sister of Sultan Suleiman the Magnificent.

== Marriage ==
Beyhan married Ferhad Pasha in 1513. Ferhad, initially served as the third vizier, and contributed essential military expertise to Suleiman during the early years of his reign. However, a turning point emerged upon Suleiman's return from Rhodes in 1523, triggering accusations against Ferhad, ranging from misappropriation of property to mismanagement of the sultan's troops. Rather than opting for execution, Suleiman, potentially influenced by intercession from Hafsa and Beyhan, chose to demote Ferhad to the distant district governorship of Semendire. This geographical separation aimed to mitigate perceived threats to Constantinople, but Ferhad's fortunes further soured when his forces suffered a defeat by the Hungarians near Semendire in August 1523, leading to his dismissal from all positions.

Despite these setbacks, Hafsa and Beyhan's persistent intercession secured an audience for Ferhad with Suleiman in November 1524, in Edirne. Unfortunately, Ferhad's efforts to convince Suleiman of his innocence proved futile. Frustration boiled over during the meeting, with Ferhad vehemently declaring himself a victim of a high-level conspiracy. Suleiman, compelled to act, ordered Ferhad's removal. Ferhad's continued protests, combined with the brandishing of a dagger, escalated the situation, resulting in his imprisonment and eventual execution by decapitation. Suleiman, reportedly intending only imprisonment, found himself forced into a more severe response due to Ferhad's violent behavior. The aftermath of Ferhad's execution left Beyhan inconsolable, severing ties with Suleiman as she chose seclusion, marking the beginning of a permanent estrangement between them. Refusing to remarry, she lived in self-exile from Constantinople., but according to some sources she was later forced by Suleiman to remarry Mehmed Pasha.

== Death and burial ==
Beyhan Sultan died at her palace in Skopje in 1559. Her resting place is located inside the türbe of her father Selim I in Yavuz Selim Mosque.

== Issue ==
By Ferhad, Beyhan had at least two children:

- Esmehan Hanımsultan. She married Koca Sinan Pasha and had a son, Mehmed Pasha, and three daughters, Emine Hanım, Hatice Hanım and Hüma Hanım.
- Another child. Documents relating to Ferhad Pasha's execution mention his and Beyhan's children when they talk about his family's grief, but without specifying their name, number or gender.

== Depictions in literature and popular culture ==
In the TV series Muhteşem Yüzyıl, Beyhan Sultan is portrayed by Turkish actress Pınar Çağlar Gençtürk.
