= Yavuz Selim Mosque =

16th-century mosque in Istanbul, Turkey

Yavuz Sultan Selim Mosque Selim I Mosque
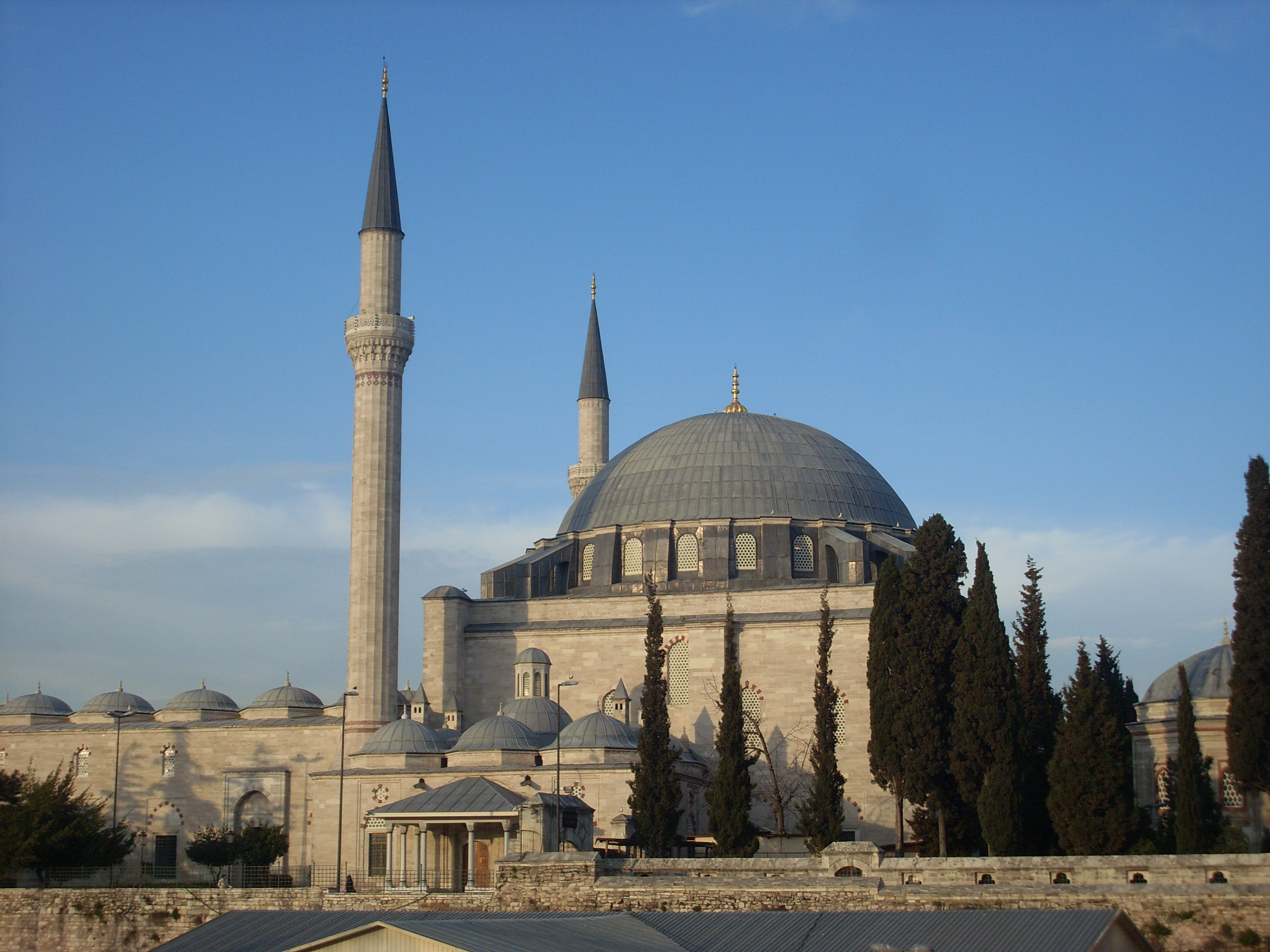

- Location in the Fatih district of Istanbul

Religion
- Affiliation: Sunni Islam

Location
- Location: Istanbul, Turkey
- Coordinates: 41°01′35.6″N 28°57′4.8″E

Architecture
- Type: Mosque
- Groundbreaking: 1520/21
- Completed: 1527/28

Specifications
- Height (max): 32.5 m (107 ft)
- Dome dia. (outer): 24.5 m (80 ft)
- Minaret: 2
- Minaret height: 45 m (148 ft)?
- Materials: cut stone, granite, marble

The Yavuz Selim Mosque, also known as the Selim I Mosque and the Yavuz Sultan Selim Mosque (Turkish: Yavuz Selim Camii) is a 16th-century Ottoman imperial mosque located at the top of the 5th hill of Istanbul, Turkey, in the neighborhood of Çukurbostan, overlooking the Golden Horn. Its size and geographic position make it a familiar landmark on the Istanbul skyline.

== History ==
The Yavuz Selim Mosque is the second oldest extant imperial mosque in Istanbul. It was commissioned by the Ottoman sultan Suleiman the Magnificent in memory of his father Selim I who died in 1520. The architect was Alaüddin (Acem Alisi). The mosque was completed in 1527/8. Attempts have been made to associate the structure with the famous imperial architect Mimar Sinan, but there is no supporting documentary evidence, and the date of the mosque is too early. However, one of the türbe in the garden of the mosque is a work of Sinan (see below).

== Architecture ==
=== Exterior ===
The mosque was built on a terrace overlooking the Cistern of Aspar, the largest of the three Roman reservoirs in Constantinople. The large courtyard (avlu) has a colonnaded portico with columns of various types of marble and granite. The mosque has panels of coloured tiles that were decorated using the cuerda seca technique. These are similar to the lunette panels above the windows on either side of the fireplace in the Circumcision Room (Sünnet Odası) of the Topkapı Palace and were almost certainly made by the same group of Iranian craftsmen working for the Ottoman court. The mosque is flanked by twin minarets.

=== Interior ===
The interior plan of the mosque is a simple square room, 24.5 metres (80 ft) on each side, covered by a shallow dome 32.5 metres (107 ft) in height. As with the Hagia Sophia, the dome is much shallower than a full hemisphere. The windows are decorated with lunette panels of polychrome cuerda seca tiles. To the north and south of the main room, domed passages led to four small domed rooms which were intended to function as hospices for traveling dervishes.

== Tombs ==
Located in the garden behind the mosque and overlooking the Golden Horn is the türbe of Sultan Selim I which was completed in 1523. The building is externally octagonal, and has a porch decorated with panels of tiles of unique design.

A second octagonal türbe with a long inscription carved into the stonework of the exterior contains the tombs of three sons of Suleiman the Magnificent (Mahmud, Murad and Abdullah) and two daughters of Selim I (Hafize Hafsa and Hatice). It dates from 1556, and is attributed to Mimar Sinan. The third türbe in the garden is that of Sultan Abdülmecid I, built shortly before his death in 1861.

== Gallery ==
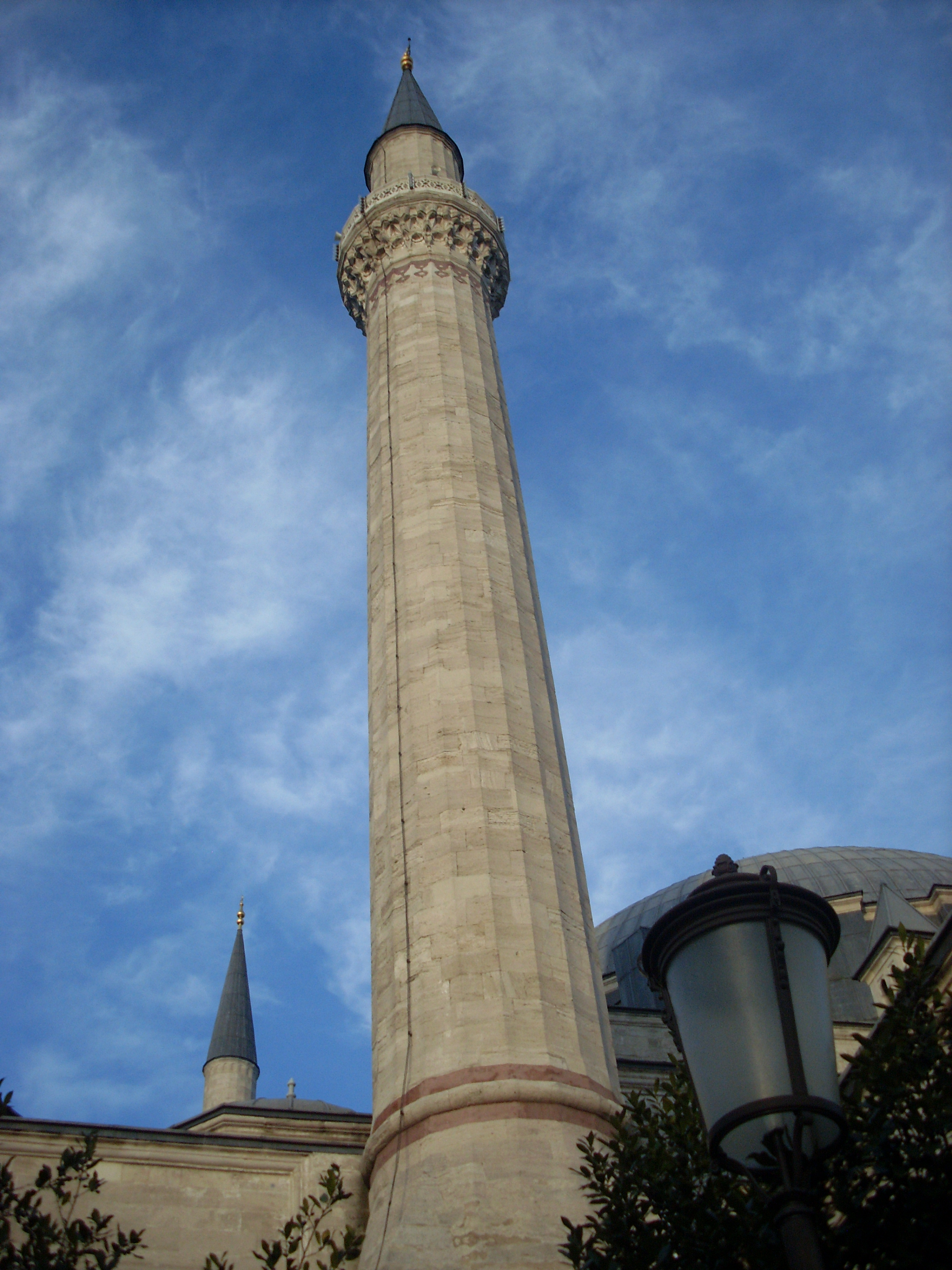
One of the twin minarets

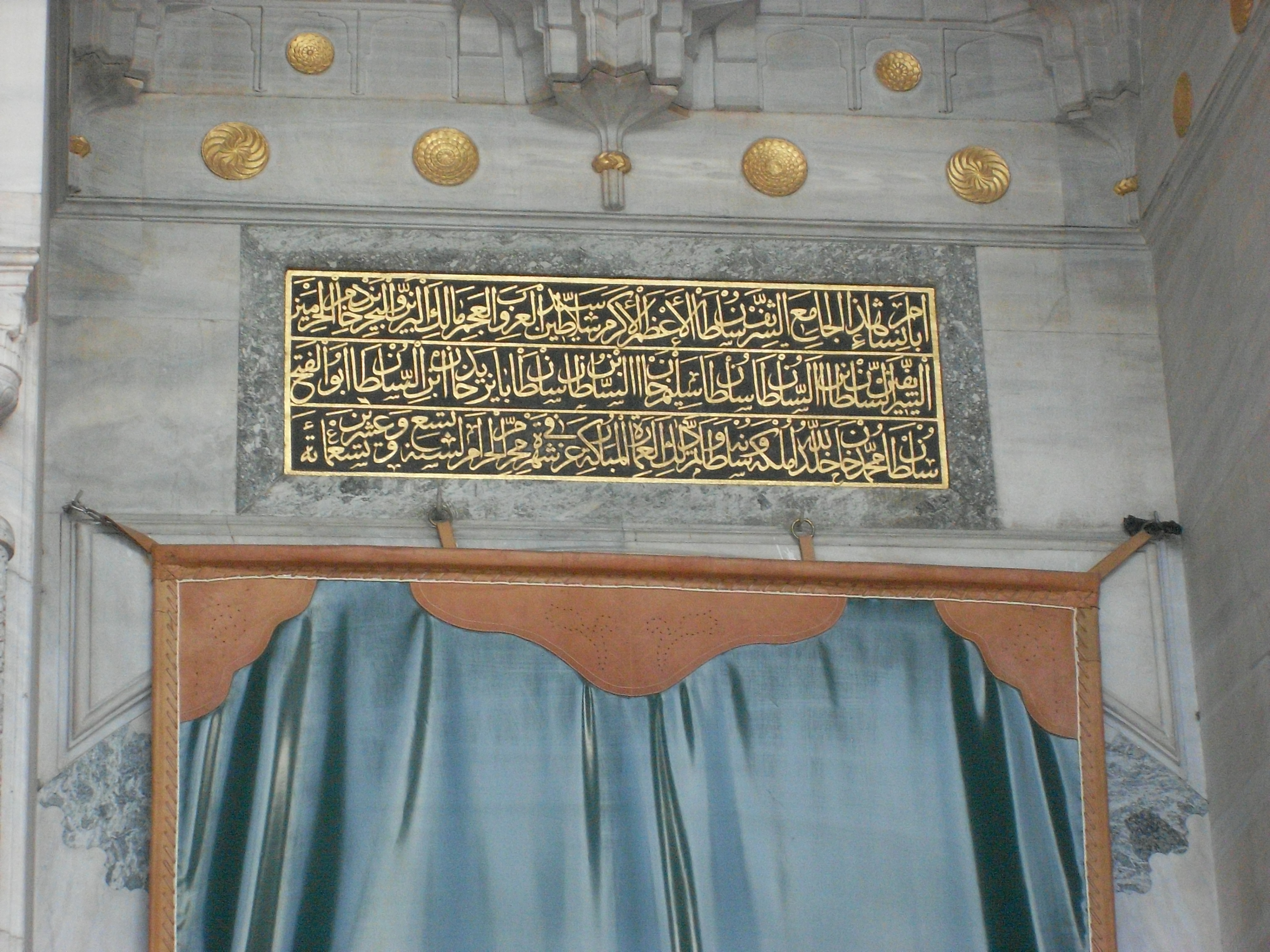
Arabic inscription at the entrance commemorating the construction of the mosque

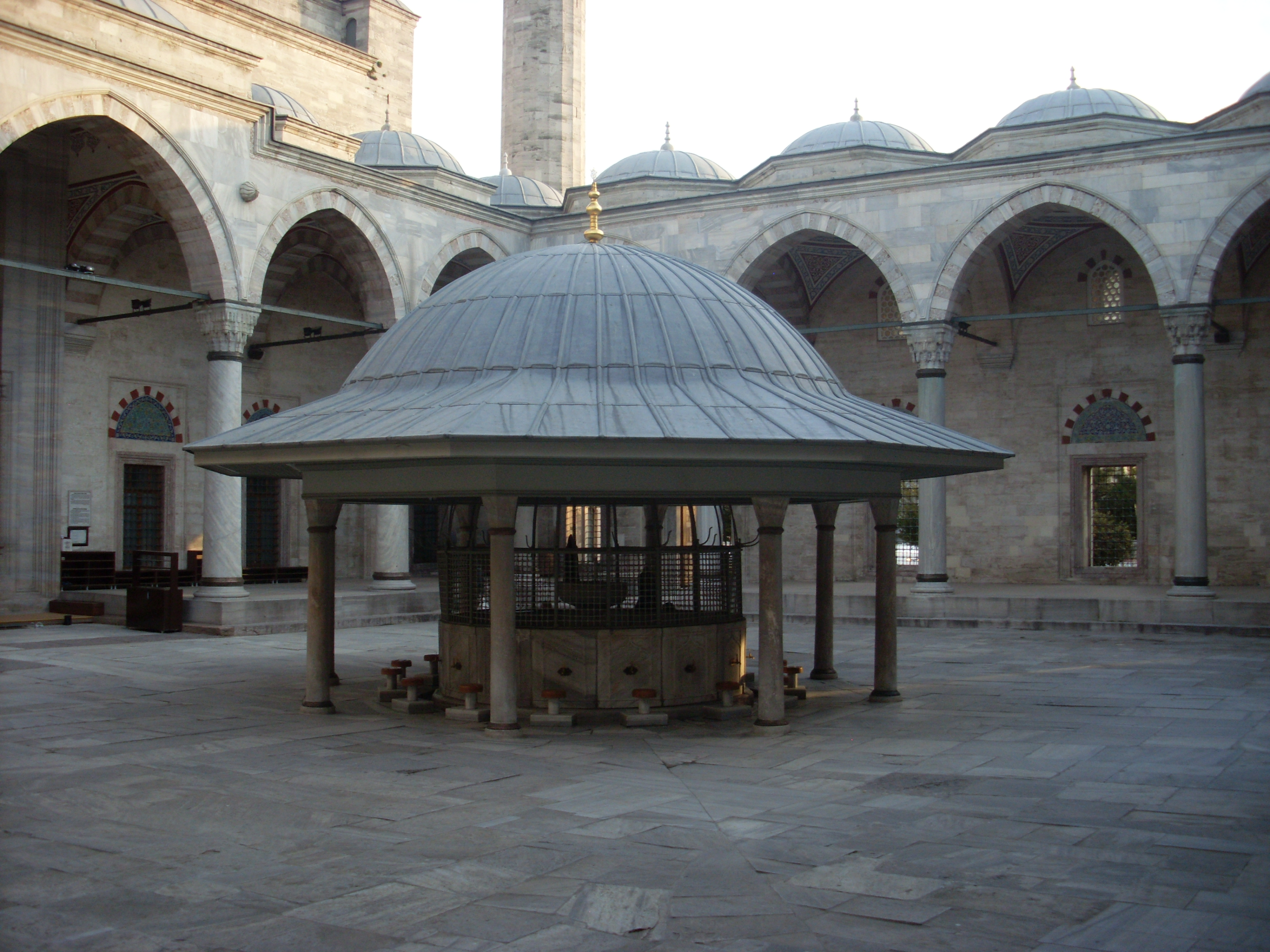
The ablution fountain in the courtyard

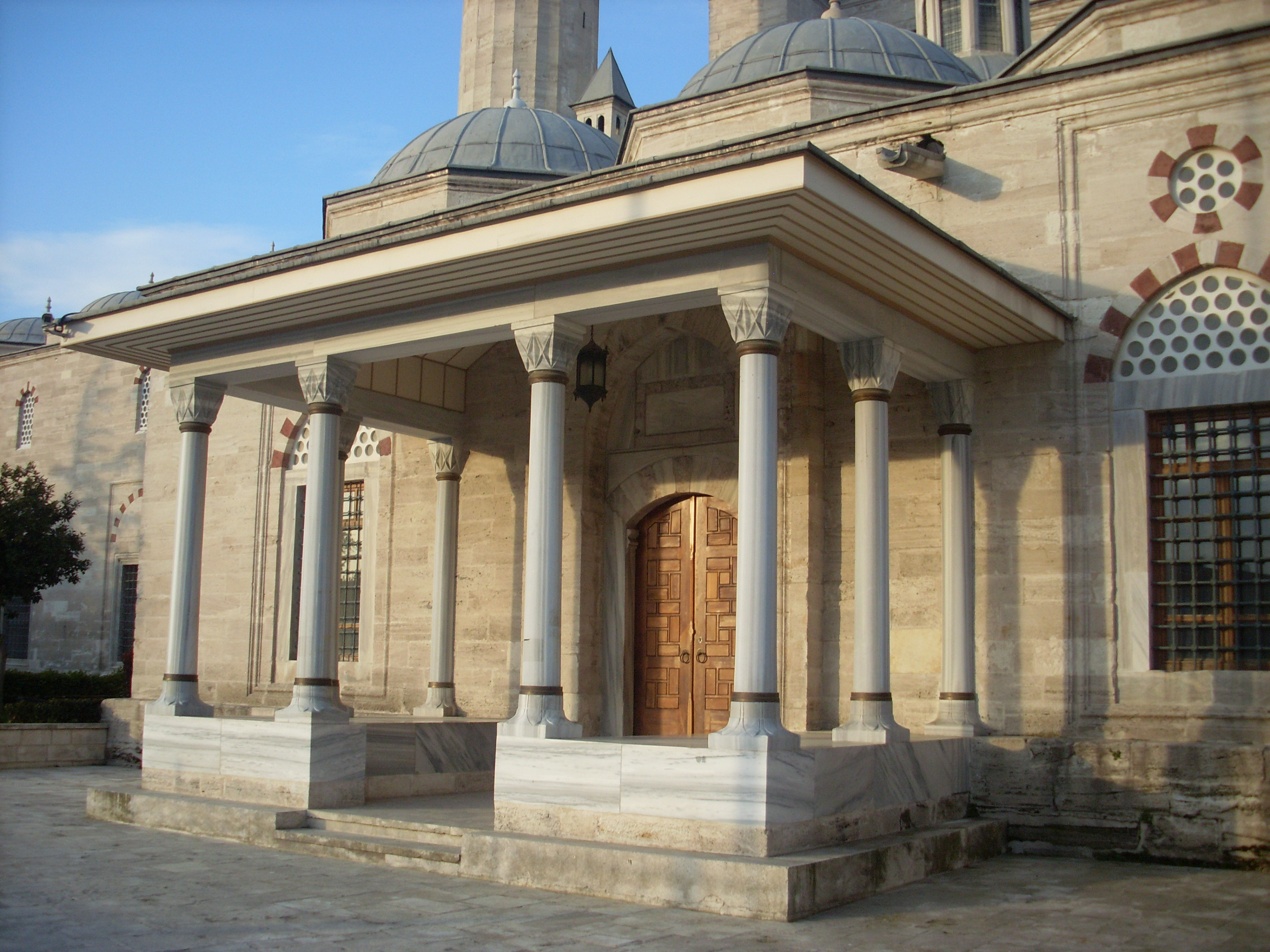
Side entrance door

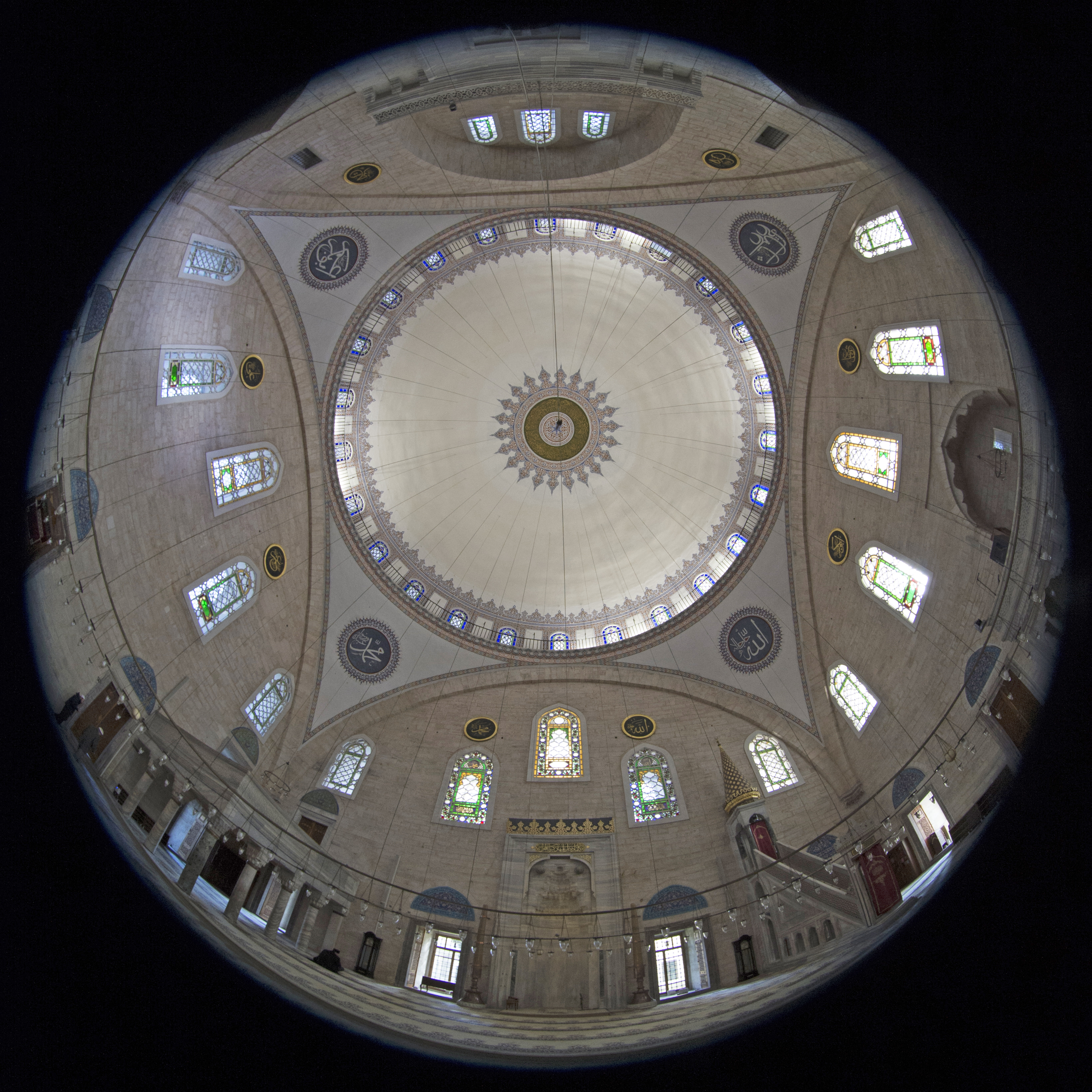
Yavuz Selim Sultan Mosque 9489 01

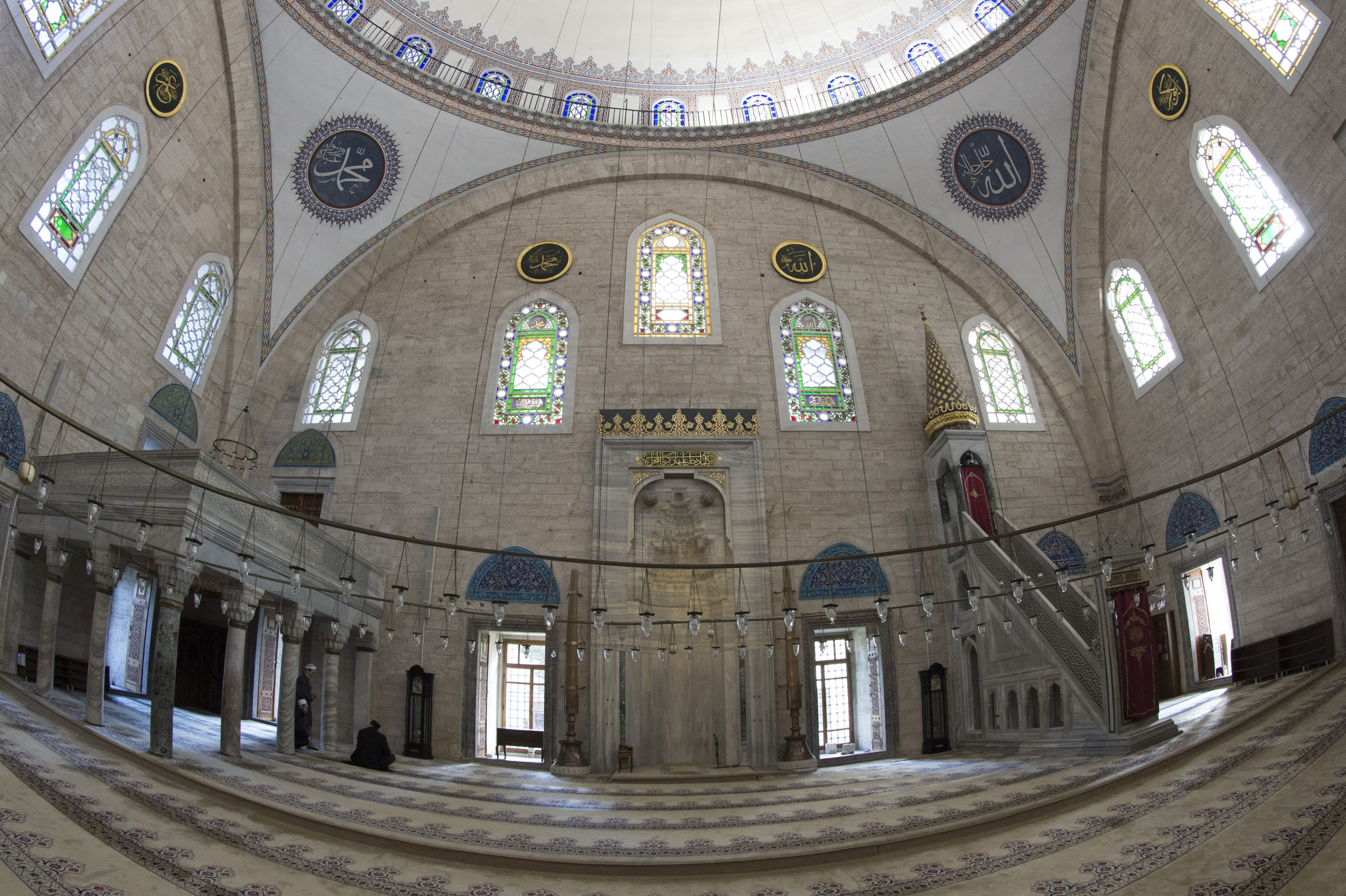
Yavuz Selim Sultan Mosque 9489 02

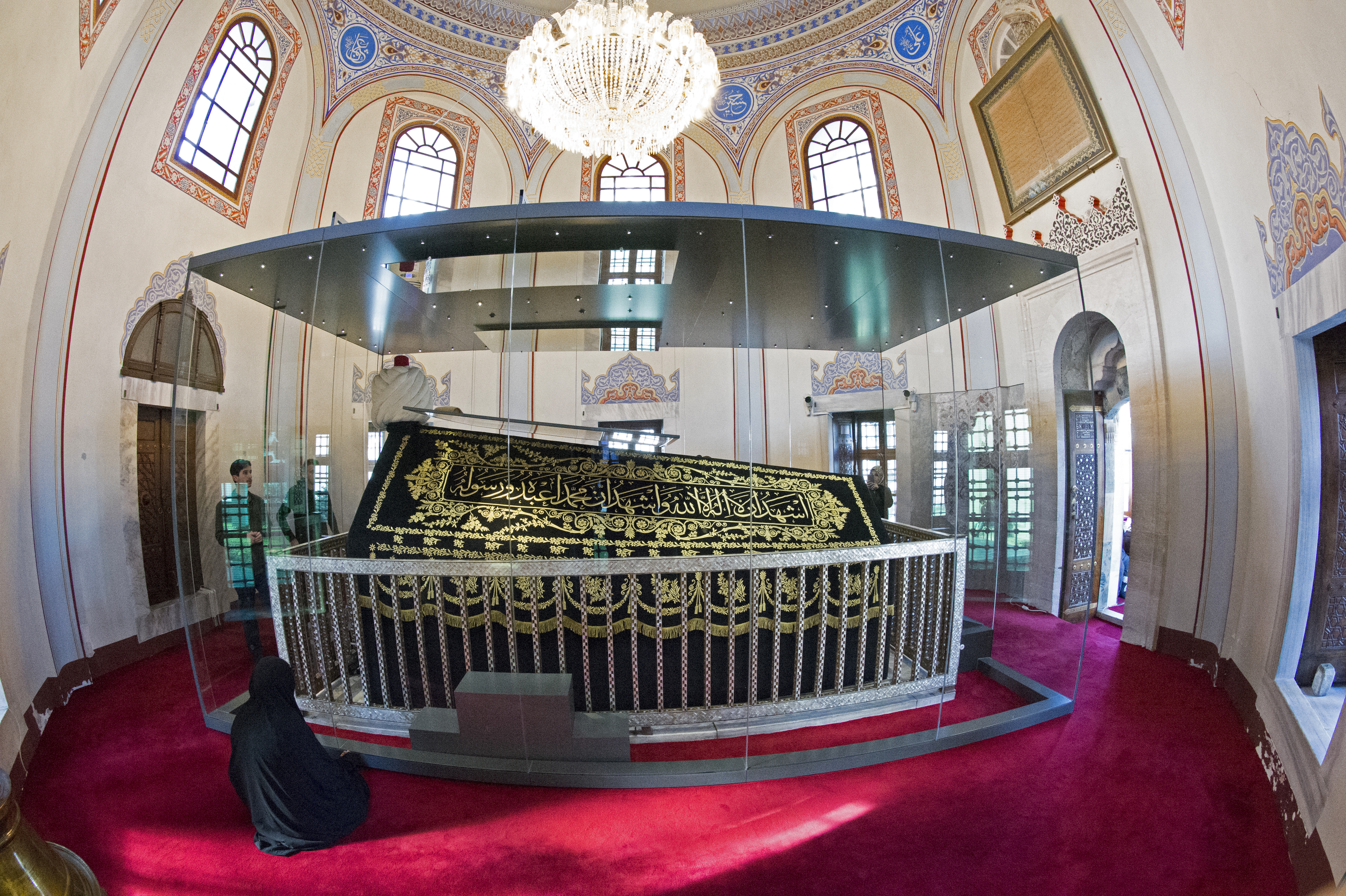
Mausoleum of Yavuz Selim Sultan Mosque 9495

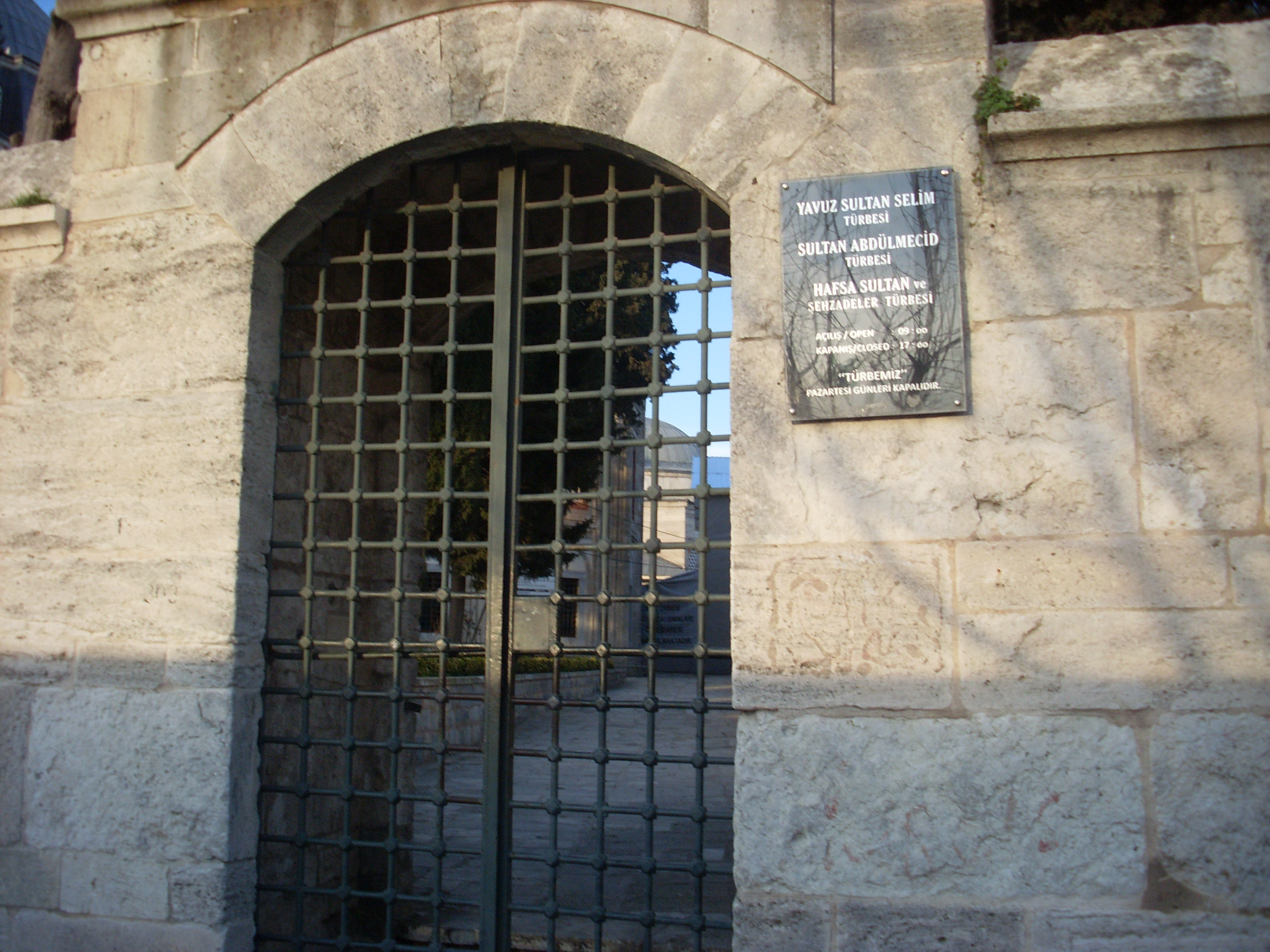
The entrance for the türbes of Yavuz Sultan Selim, Hafsa Sultan and Sultan Abdülmecid

== See also ==
- List of mosques
- Ottoman architecture
- Mosques commissioned by the Ottoman dynasty

== Sources ==
- Carswell, John (2006) [1998]. Iznik Pottery. London: British Museum Press. ISBN 978-0-7141-2441-4.
- Goodwin, Godfrey (2003) [1971]. A History of Ottoman Architecture. London: Thames & Hudson. ISBN 0-500-27429-0.
- Necipoğlu, Gülru (1990). "From International Timurid to Ottoman: a change of taste in sixteenth-century ceramic tiles". Muqarnas. 7: 136–170. doi:10.2307/1523126. JSTOR 1523126. Archived from the original on 2021-07-30.
- Necipoğlu, Gülru (2005). The Age of Sinan: Architectural Culture in the Ottoman Empire. London: Reaktion Books. ISBN 978-1-86189-253-9.
