= Hafize Sultan =

Ottoman princess, daughter of Sultan Selim I

- Born: ante 1494; Trabzon, Ottoman Empire
- Died: 10 July 1538; Constantinople, Ottoman Empire (present day Istanbul, Turkey)
- Burial: Yavuz Selim Mosque, Istanbul
- Spouse: Dukaginzade Ahmed Pasha (m. 1511; died 1515)
- Dynasty: Ottoman
- Father: Selim I
- Mother: Hafsa Sultan
- Religion: Sunni Islam

Hafize Hafsa Sultan (Ottoman Turkish: حافظة حفصة سلطان; ante 1494 – 10 July 1538) was an Ottoman princess, daughter of Selim I and his favorite Hafsa Hatun. She was the sister of Suleiman the Magnificent.

== Origins ==
Hafize, also called Hafsa, Hafife, Hafisa or Hafiza in the sources, was born before 1494 in Trebizond, on the Black Sea, by the then Şehzade Selim, son of Bayezid II and governor of the province. Her mother was Hafsa Hatun, Selim's favorite, who in 1494 give birth Selim's successor, Suleiman.

In 1512, her father became Sultan, while Hafize was already married in 1511 and lived with her husband. When her husband became Grand Vizier, she moved with him to Constantinople.

== Marriage ==
Hafize Sultan married once. Her husband was Grand Vizier Dukaginzade Ahmed Pasha, executed in 1515. Hafize was his third wife, and Ahmed Pasha was no stranger to dynastic marriages: he had previously been married to Hafize's cousin, Gevherşah Hanimsultan, and both his sons from his first and second marriages also married members of the dynasty.

== Death ==
Hafize died on 10 July 1538 in Constantinople (İstanbul). She was buried in the Şehzadeler türbesi in the Yavuz Selim Mosque.

== Bibliography ==
- Peirce, Leslie P., The Imperial Harem: Women and Sovereignty in the Ottoman Empire, Oxford University Press, 1993, ISBN 0-19-508677-5.
- Uluçay, M. Çağatay (1992). Padişahların kadınları ve kızları. Ötüken.
- Yılmaz Öztuna - Yavuz Sultan Selim
- Necdet Sakaoğlu - Bu Mülkün Kadın Sultanları
