= Hafsa Sultan =

First Valide Sultan of the Ottoman Empire from 1520 to 1534

- Valide Sultan
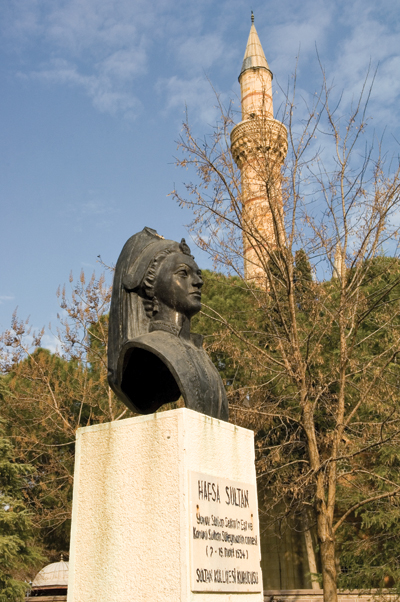
- Bust of Hafsa Sultan, Manisa, Turkey

Valide Sultan of the Ottoman Empire
- Tenure: 22 September 1520 – 19 March 1534
- Predecessor: Gülbahar Hatun (as Valide Hatun)
- Successor: Nurbanu Sultan
- Born: 1478/1479
- Died: 19 March 1534; Eski Saray, Constantinople, Ottoman Empire
- Burial: Yavuz Selim Mosque, Fatih, Constantinople
- Consort of: Selim I
- Issue: Hatice Sultan; Fatma Sultan; Hafize Sultan; Beyhan Sultan; Suleiman I
Names
- English: Hafsa Sultan; Ottoman Turkish: حفصه سلطان
- House: Ottoman
- Religion: Sunni Islam (converted)

Ayşe Hafsa Sultan (Ottoman Turkish: حفصه سلطان; 1478/1479 – 19 March 1534), was a concubine of Selim I and the mother of Suleiman the Magnificent and at least four princesses, incluiding Beyhan Sultan. She was the last title holder of Valide Hatun and the unofficial first Valide Sultan of the Ottoman Empire and during the period between her son's enthronement in 1520 until her death in 1534, she was one of the most influential women in the Ottoman Empire.

== Erroneous identification ==
The traditional and widely accepted view held that Hafsa Sultan was a daughter of Meñli I Giray (1445–1515), the Khan of the Crimean Tatars. This identification appeared in numerous early modern Western accounts and was subsequently adopted by generations of Turkish and Western historians.

However, modern Ottoman historians have against this traditional view based on Ottoman documentary evidence. Scholars such as Alan Fisher, Leslie Peirce, and Feridun Emecen have concluded that Hafsa Sultan was actually of slave origin, rather than a member of the Crimean royal family.

According to Fisher and other modern scholars, this long-standing misconception likely arose from a historical conflation of Hafsa Sultan with another of Selim I's consorts, Ayşe Hatun, who was the actual daughter of Meñli I Giray. Historians Ilya Zaytsev and Esin Atıl also explicitly identify Ayşe Hatun as the Crimean princess, distinguishing her lineage from that of Hafsa Sultan.

== Early life ==
Around sixteen, Hafsa became one of the many concubines of Selim, when he was a prince and the governor of Trabzon from 1487. With him, she had at least four daughters, Hatice Sultan, Fatma Sultan, Hafize Sultan and Beyhan Sultan and, in 1494, one son, Suleiman.

According to Turkish tradition, all princes were expected to work as provincial governors as a part of their training. Hafsa joined Suleiman during his early princely assignments, initially in Kefe in 1509, and later in Manisa in 1513. She was supervisor and manager of the inner household and of Suleiman's personal life. Within his court in Kefe, she was granted a monthly stipend of 1,000 aspers, compared to Suleiman's 600 aspers. In 1513, as the mother of the heir apparent, Hafsa received a stipend of 150 aspers a day. In Manisa, where she became the eldest member of the household, she received a further raise, being granted a monthly stipend of 200 aspers a day. This stipend totalling 6,000 aspers a month surpassed that of anyone else on the princely payroll and was triple that of the prince himself.

During Suleiman's time in the provinces, Hafsa was his closest and most constant companion. According to Guillaume Postel, she purportedly saved Suleiman from potential execution by his father. She allegedly instructed him to disavow any interest in succeeding his father as the sultan. Several years before Selim's death, he is said to have tested his sons' loyalty by expressing a desire to retire from the sultanate and asking which of them sought to rule the empire. Postel conveyed that those who responded with boldness met a fatal fate. Suleiman, guided by his mother's understanding of Selim, declined the opportunity, asserting that he was his father's slave, not his son. He expressed that even after Selim's death, assuming such responsibility would cause him great distress.

== Valide Sultan ==
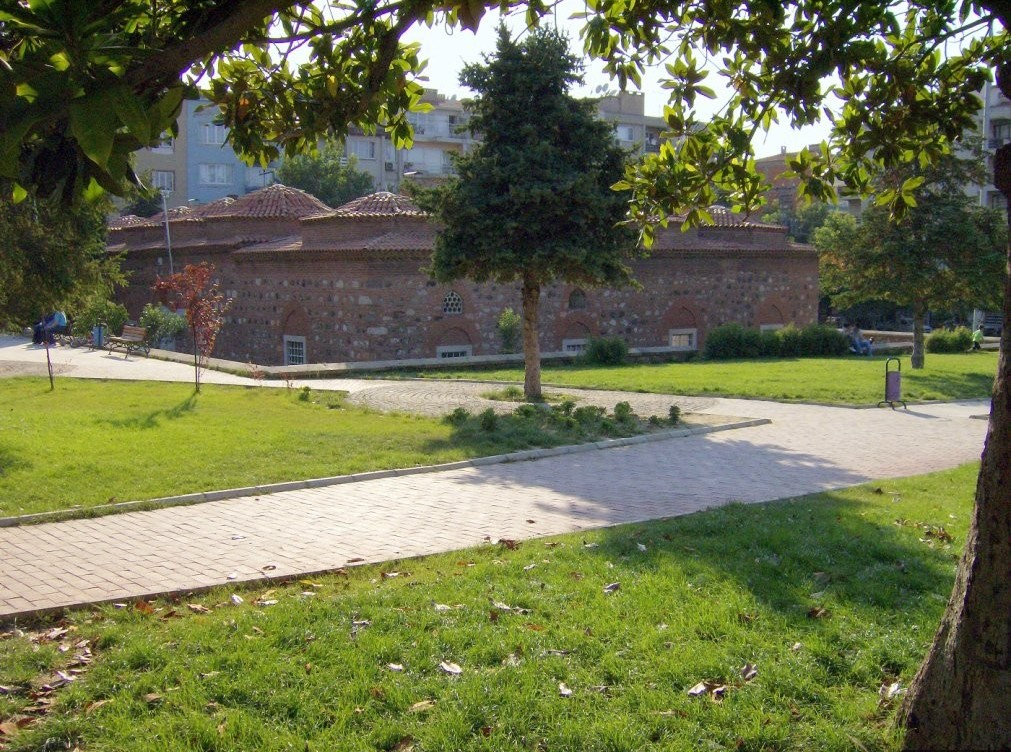
The külliye built on the orders of Hafsa Sultan in Manisa. It is part of the adjoining Sultan Mosque

After Suleiman's accession to the throne in 1520, Hafsa came to reside in the Old Palace in Istanbul. Following his ascent, and likely with his approval, Hafsa, began signing her letters as "the sultan's mother" (valide-i sultan). Although not an official title, it became widely recognized. Hafsa, possibly the first sultanic mother to consistently use this appellation, served as a crucial source of support for various individuals during these years, particularly women associated with the dynasty. Examples include aiding the daughters of Prince Âlemşah after their mother's death, assisting a female member of Khayr Beg's harem, and attempting to prevent the execution of the allegedly corrupt Ferhad Pasha, the husband of her daughter Beyhan. Furthemore, Hafsa had a kira named Strongilah, who provided assistance to the women in the harem and developed a strong bond with the sultanic mother.

During the early years of Suleiman's reign, Hafsa emerged as a dominant female influence in his life, as evidenced by her son's granting of the title "Valide Sultan" (Mother Sultan) to her, making her the first person in Ottoman history to bear the title of sultana despite not having royal blood. Suleiman had a deep affection for his mother, which is highlighted in Bragadin's 1526 report, describing her as "a very beautiful woman of 48, for whom [the sultan] bears great reverence and love." Following the Ottoman triumph at the battle of Mohács in 1526, Suleiman took special care to personally inform his mother of the victory through a letter, emphasizing the close bond and reverence he had for her.Although her letters carried formal chancery formulas, they revealed an intimate undertone. Expressing a deep yearning for her son's company and showcasing concern for his safety during campaigns, Hafsa's letters unveiled the profound bond between mother and child. In a rare handwritten letter, she shared a light-hearted anecdote about a household servant and lamented a missed opportunity to see him. Ending the letter with a gift of black-eyed peas, she conveyed her love, stating that even a treasure wouldn't be enough of a gift for Suleiman, addressing him as "the light of my eye, the joy of my heart."

== Charities ==
Hafsa initiated the construction of an extensive mosque complex in Manisa, surpassing any built by previous concubines. Its construction probably started during Suleiman's governorship in Manisa, and was completed in 1522–23. This complex included a mosque, a religious college, a dervish hostel, a primary school, and a soup kitchen, employing a staff of 117. Suleiman later expanded it to include a hospital and a bath in his mother's name. Known as "Sultaniye," this imperial mosque featured two minarets, an honor typically reserved for the sultan. Financed through properties acquired with support from Suleiman's father, Selim, and later Suleiman himself, the mosque complex was endowed with income generated from these assets.

Hafsa's groundwork for the project included a significant collective purchase in 1518, involving 56 ordinary shops, 11 shops with roofed fronts, and 111 booths in the Urla market near Izmir. This acquisition, totaling 116 transactions and valued at 66,690 aspers, laid the foundation for the mosque complex's financial support. Beyond construction, Hafsa actively promoted settlement in the mosque's vicinity, offering lots for rent or sale. Those constructing residences on these lots received tax exemptions from the sultan as an encouragement.

== Death ==
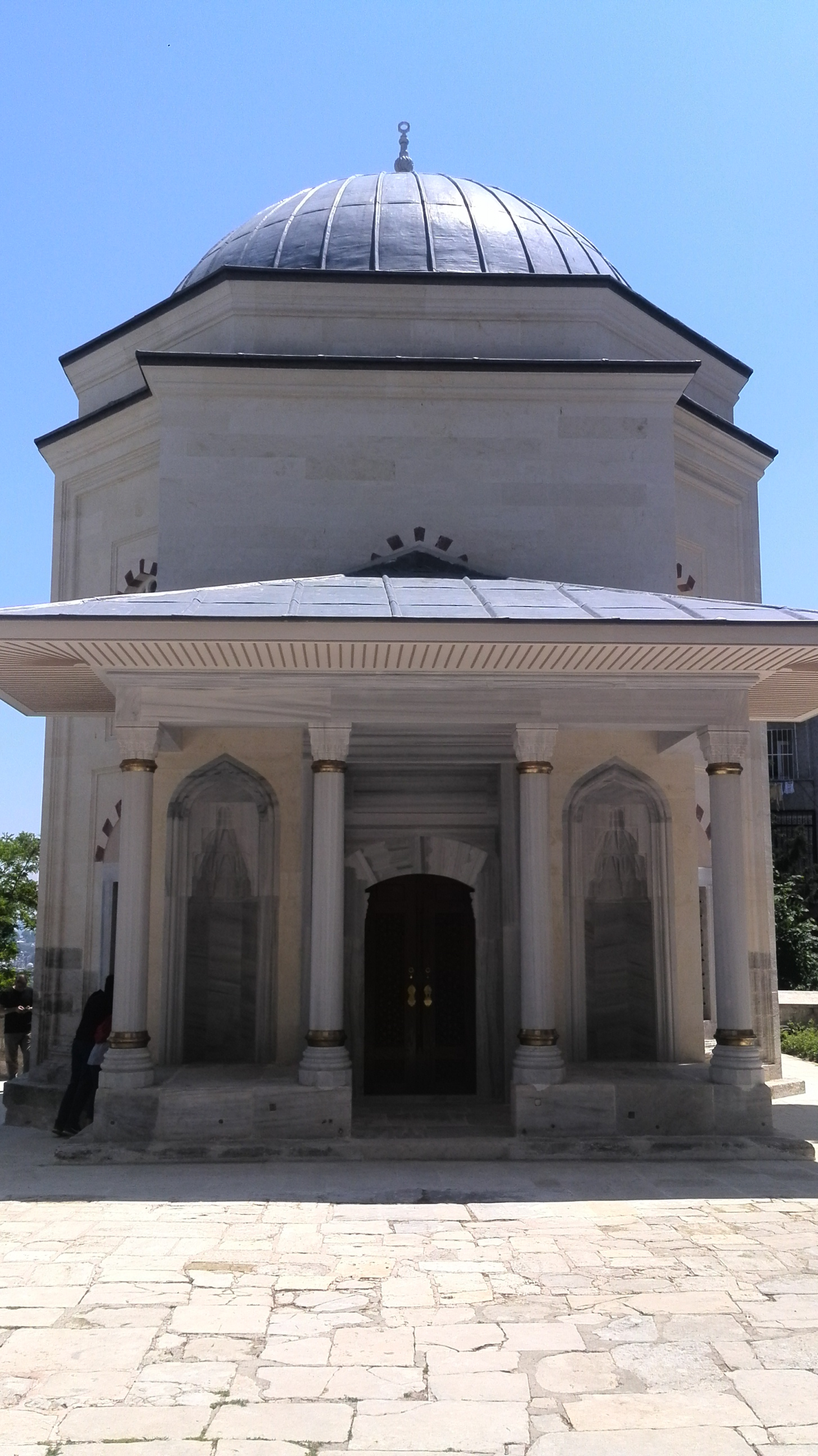
The entrance to the türbe of Hafsa Sultan

Hafsa died on 19 March 1534, and was buried in the vicinity of her husband’s tomb in Yavuz Selim Mosque, Istanbul. Construction of a separate mausoleum for her was ordered, and readers were hired to recite the Quran continuously at her grave. Her funeral was marked by significant public demonstrations of mourning. In the depiction of her funeral, royal chancellor and historian Celâlzâde Mustafa Çelebi paid tribute to her with an extensive series of commendations, likening her to revered Muslim women. He compared her to Khadija, the first wife of Muhammad, as well as to Fatima and Aisha, highlighting her asceticism, righteous thoughts, and her active involvement in charitable foundations and virtuous deeds.

== Issue ==
Together with Selim, Hafsa had four daughters before having her only son:

- Hatice Sultan (ante 1494 – post 1543/44). Married twice, she had five sons and at least three daughters.
- Fatma Sultan (ante 1494 – c. 1566). Married three times, maybe she had two daughters.
- Beyhan Sultan (ante 1494 – 1559; called also Peykhan Sultan). Married to Ferhad Pasha, she had at least two children.
- Hafize Sultan (ante 1494 – 10 July 1538). She married once.
- Suleiman I (6 November 1494 – 6 September 1566). 10th Sultan of the Ottoman Empire.

== In popular culture ==
- In the 1997 Ukrainian series Roxolana, Hafsa Sultan is played by Tatjana Nasarowa.
- In the 2003 TV miniseries Hürrem Sultan, Hafsa Sultan is played by Turkish actress Deniz Türkali.
- In the 2005 German documentary miniseries Mätressen – Die geheime Macht der Frauen (Mistresses – The Secret Power of Women), Hafsa Sultan is played by German actress Cornelia Schmaus.
- In the 2011 TV series Muhteşem Yüzyıl, young Hafsa Sultan is played by Turkish actress Evrim Alasya, and old Hafsa Sultan is played by Turkish actress Nebahat Çehre.
- In the 2019 series Kingdoms of Fire, Hafsa Sultan is played by Tunisian actress Souhir Ben Amara.

== Sources ==
- Peirce, L.P. (1993). The Imperial Harem: Women and Sovereignty in the Ottoman Empire. Studies in Middle Eastern history. Oxford University Press. ISBN 978-0-19-508677-5.
- Şahin, K. (2023). Peerless Among Princes: The Life and Times of Sultan Süleyman. Oxford University Press. ISBN 978-0-19-753163-1.

Ottoman royalty
Preceded by Gülbahar Hatun	Valide Sultan; 22 September 1520 – 19 March 1534	Succeeded by Nurbanu Sultan
