= Selim I =

Sultan of the Ottoman Empire from 1512 to 1520

- Custodian of the Two Holy Mosques
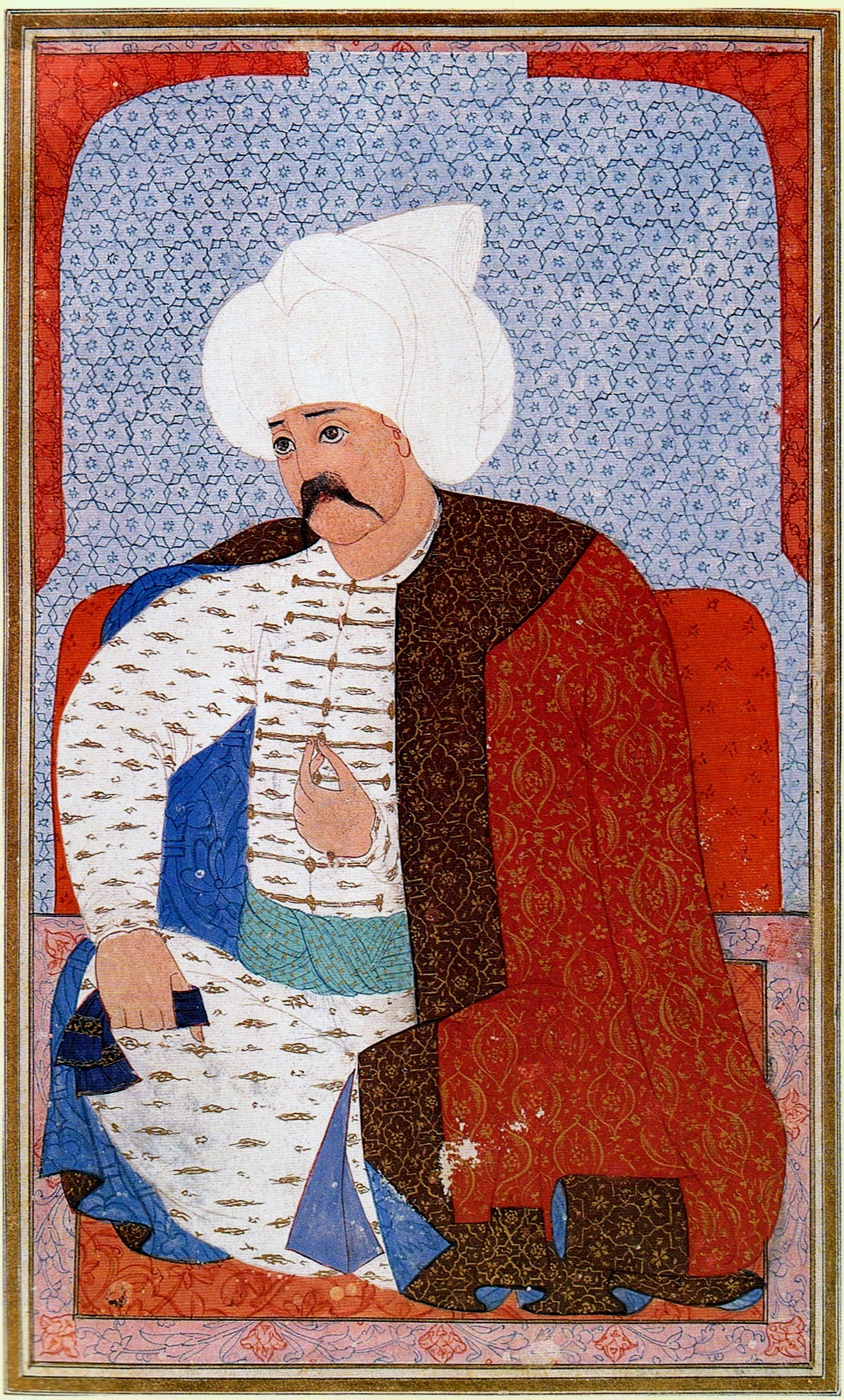
- 16th-century miniature of Selim I by Nakkaş Osman

Sultan of the Ottoman Empire (Padishah)
- Reign: 24 April 1512 – 22 September 1520
- Predecessor: Bayezid II
- Successor: Suleiman I

Ottoman caliph (Amir al-Mu'minin)
- Reign: 22 January 1517 – 22 September 1520
- Predecessor: Al-Mutawakkil III (Abbasid caliph)
- Successor: Suleiman I

Prince-Governor of Trebizond Sanjak
- Reign: 1487–1510
- Born: 10 October 1470; Amasya, Ottoman Empire
- Died: 22 September 1520 (aged 49); Çorlu, Ottoman Empire
- Burial: Yavuz Selim Mosque, Fatih, Istanbul, Turkey
- Spouse: Ayşe Hatun; Hafsa Sultan; ? Hatun (mother of Üveys Pasha)
- Issue Among others: Hatice Sultan; Hafize Sultan; Beyhan Sultan; Fatma Sultan; Suleiman I; Şah Sultan; Üveys Pasha (ill.)
Names
- سليم شاه بن بايزيد خان; Selīm şāh bin Bāyezīd Ḫān
- Dynasty: Ottoman
- Father: Bayezid II
- Mother: Ayşe Gülbahar Hatun
- Religion: Sunni Islam
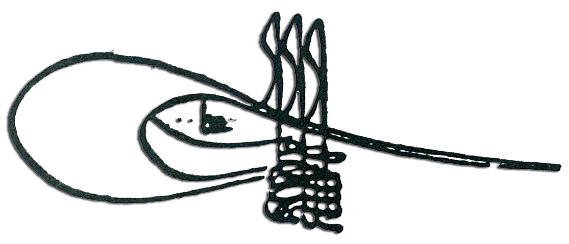
- Tughra
- Military career
- Conflicts: Ottoman Civil War (1509–1513); Battle of Tekirdag; Battle of Yenişehir (1513); Şahkulu rebellion; Ottoman–Persian War (1505–1517); Trabzon Expedition (1505); Battle of Erzincan (1507); Trabzon Expedition (1510); Battle of Chaldiran; Capture of Tabriz (1514); Siege of Bayburt (1514); Siege of Kemah; Ottoman invasion of Imereti and Guria (1509); Ottoman–Mamluk War (1516–1517); Battle of Marj Dabiq; Capture of Aleppo; Capture of Damascus (1516); Battle of Ridaniya; Capture of Cairo (1517); Battle of Cairo (1517); Battle of Turnadağ; Euphrates-Tigris Expedition

Selim I (Note: Ottoman Turkish: سليم أول, romanized: Selim-i evvel; Turkish: I. Selim) (10 October 1470 – 22 September 1520), also known as Selim the Grim or Selim the Resolute, (Note: Turkish: Yavuz Sultan Selim) was the sultan of the Ottoman Empire from 1512 to 1520. Despite lasting only eight years, his reign is notable for the enormous expansion of the Empire, particularly his conquest between 1516 and 1517 of the entire Mamluk Sultanate of Egypt, which included all of the Levant, Hejaz, and Egypt itself. On the eve of his death in 1520, the Ottoman Empire spanned about 3.4 million km^{2} (1.3 million sq mi), having grown by seventy percent during Selim's reign.

Selim's conquest of the Middle Eastern heartlands of the Muslim world, and particularly his assumption of the role of guardian of the pilgrimage routes to Mecca and Medina, established the Ottoman Empire as the pre-eminent Muslim state. His conquests dramatically shifted the empire's geographical and cultural center of gravity away from the Balkans and toward the Middle East. By the eighteenth century, Selim's conquest of the Mamluk Sultanate had come to be romanticized as the moment when the Ottomans seized leadership over the rest of the Muslim world, and consequently Selim is popularly remembered as the first legitimate Ottoman Caliph, although stories of an official transfer of the caliphal office from the last Mamluk Abbasid caliph to the Ottomans were a later invention.

== Early life ==
Selim was born in Amasya on 10 October 1470 as the son of Şehzade Bayezid (later Bayezid II) during the reign of his grandfather Mehmed II. His mother was Gülbahar Hatun, a Pontic Greek concubine, who was formerly confused with Ayşe Hatun, another consort of Bayezid and daughter of Alaüddevle Bozkurt Bey, the eleventh ruler of the Dulkadirids. In 1479 at the age of nine, he was sent by his grandfather to Istanbul to be circumcised along with his brothers. In 1481, his grandfather Mehmed II died and his father became Sultan Bayezid II. Six years later in 1487, he was sent by his father to Trabzon to serve there as governor.

== Campaigns and Battles ==
=== Securing the Sultanate ===
==== Campaign of Trebizond (1505) ====
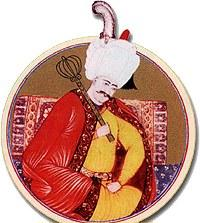
Selim I with a mace

In 1505, Ebrahim Mirza, a Safavid prince and the younger brother of Shah Ismail I of Iran, marched on Trabzon with an army of 3,000. Hearing of this, Selim left the city with an expeditionary force consisting of 450 men, who, under his personal command, repelled the exponentially larger Safavid army, and chased Ebrahim Mirza to Erzincan. Selim's incursion into Erzincan resulted in Shah Ismail writing a letter of complaint to Sultan Bayezid II, but did not get any results.

==== Battle of Erzincan (1507) ====
In 1507, the Safavids under the command of Shah Ismail organized an expedition against Ala al-Dawla Bozkurt of Dulkadir. During this expedition, Shah Ismail, who had crossed into Ottoman territory without permission, also conscripted Turkmen warriors who were Ottoman subjects into his army.

These actions of Shah Ismail I were a violation of Ottoman sovereignty. Bayezid II did not respond to these violations, but Prince Selim, who was still governor of Trabzon at the time, attacked Erzincan and Bayburt, which belonged to the Safavids, and defeated the 10,000 strong Safavid army sent by Shah Ismail I at Erzincan.

==== Georgian Campaign (1508) ====
Following his victory over the Safavid Army at Erzincan in 1507, in the following year, Selim organized an attack against Georgia. He invaded through the west and captured the cities of Imereti and Guria, bringing western Georgia under Ottoman rule. During this campaign, Selim enslaved a large number of Georgian women, girls and boys, reportedly numbering more than 10,000.

==== Campaign of Trebizond (1510) ====
In 1510, as a response to Selim's invasion of Georgia, Shah Ismail I sent another army to Trabzon. This army, under the command of Ebrahim Mirza, was once again defeated by Prince Selim, marking the fourth consecutive defeat that Selim had inflicted on the Safavids.

==== Battle of Tekirdag (1511) ====
In 1509, Şehzade Ahmet, Selim's elder brother, had defeated a Karamanid army, supported by the Safavids in Asia Minor, and following the victory, marched on Istanbul to exploit the glory he had won. The Şehzade was refused entry to the city, as Bayezid II feared that his son meant to overthrow him.

Meanwhile, Şehzade Selim, fearing for his own safety in the event that Ahmet became Sultan, staged a revolt in Thrace in 1511, and subsequently clashed with his father's army at the Battle of Tekirdag, where, for the first and last time, the Şehzade lost a battle, and consequently fled to Crimea.

==== Battle of Yenişehir (1513) ====
By 1512 Şehzade Ahmet was the favorite candidate to succeed his father. Bayezid, who was reluctant to continue his rule over the empire, announced Ahmet as heir apparent to the throne. Angered by this announcement, Selim rebelled for a second time, and while he lost the first battle against his father's forces, Selim ultimately dethroned his father with the help of the Janissaries.

After Sultan Bayezid II was dethroned, Selim ordered that his father be exiled to a far off sanjak, but before he could reach his destination, Bayezid passed away.

When Selim ascended to the throne, his first task was to suppress his brother Ahmet's rebellion in Asia Minor, where he had declared himself Sultan of Anatolia. The army under the command of Selim and the army under the command of Prince Ahmet met near Yenişehir. Ahmet was defeated at the Battle of Yenişehir.

Following the battle, Selim put his captured brothers (Şehzade Ahmet and Şehzade Korkut) and nephews to death upon his formal accession. However, his nephew Şehzade Murad, son of the legal heir to the throne Şehzade Ahmet, fled to the neighboring Safavid Empire after his expected support failed to materialize. This fratricidal policy was motivated by bouts of civil strife that had been sparked by the antagonism between Selim's father and his uncle, Cem Sultan, and between Selim himself and his brother Ahmet.

=== Shiite Unrest and Rebellions ===
After many centuries of calm, the Alevi population launched an open revolt against the Ottomans during Selim's reign, in which they seem to have been backed by the Qizilbash of Safavid Iran. This led to harsh reprisals against the Alevis by the Ottoman Army under Selim I, and major crackdowns on Alevi gatherings.

=== The Safavid Empire ===
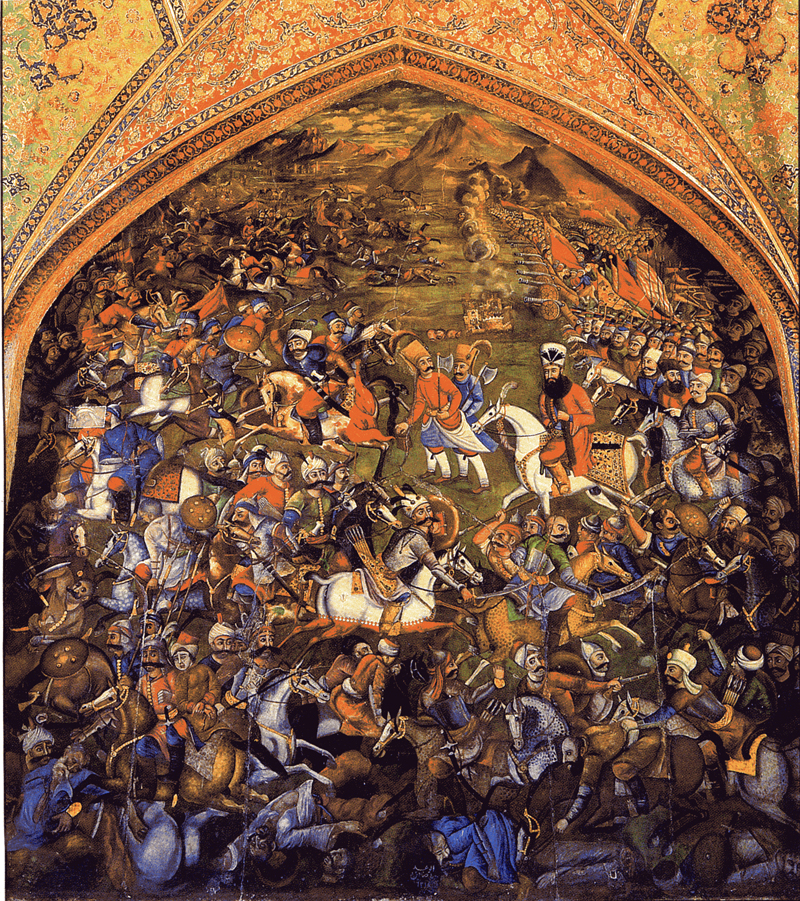
Selim I at the Battle of Chaldiran: artwork at the Chehel Sotoun Pavilion in Isfahan

One of Selim's first challenges as sultan involved the growing tension between the Ottoman Empire and the Safavid Empire led by Shah Ismail, who had recently brought the Safavids to power and had switched the Persian state religion from Sunni Islam to adherence to the Twelver branch of Shia Islam.

By 1510 Ismail had conquered the whole of Iran and Azerbaijan, southern Dagestan (with its important city of Derbent), Mesopotamia, Armenia, Khorasan, Eastern Anatolia, and had made the Georgian kingdoms of Kartli and Kakheti his vassals.

He was a great threat to his Sunni Muslim neighbors to the west. In 1511 Ismail had supported a pro-Shia/Safavid uprising in Anatolia, the Şahkulu Rebellion. In response, Selim's mufti, ibn Kemal, issued a fatwa of takfir against Shah Ismail I and his followers, declaring his lands the abode of war.

Early in his reign, Selim created a list of all Shiites ages 7 to 70 in a number of central Anatolian cities including Tokat, Sivas and Amasya. As Selim marched through these cities, his forces rounded up and executed all the Shiites they could find. Most of them were beheaded. The massacre was the largest in Ottoman history until the end of the 19th century.

In 1514, Selim I attacked the Safavid Empire to stop the spread of Shiism into Ottoman dominions. Selim and Ismā'il had exchanged a series of belligerent letters prior to the attack. On his march to face Ismā'il, Selim had 50,000 Alevis massacred, seeing them as enemies of the Ottoman Empire.

Selim I defeated Ismā'il at the Battle of Chaldiran in 1514. Ismā'il's army was more mobile and his soldiers better prepared, but the Ottomans prevailed due in large part to their efficient modern army, possession of artillery, black powder and muskets. Ismā'il was wounded and almost captured in battle, and Selim I entered the Iranian capital of Tabriz in triumph on 5 September, but did not linger. The Battle of Chaldiran was of historical significance: the reluctance of Shah Ismail to accept the advantages of modern firearms and the importance of artillery proved decisive. After the battle, Selim, referring to Ismail, stated that his adversary was: "Always drunk to the point of losing his mind and totally neglectful of the affairs of the state".

Following their victory, the Ottomans captured the Safavid capital city of Tabriz on 7 September, which they first pillaged and then evacuated. That week's Friday sermon in mosques throughout the city was delivered in Selim's name. Selim was however unable to press on after Tabriz due to the discontent amongst the janissaries. The Ottoman Empire successfully annexed Eastern Anatolia (encompassing Western Armenia) and Upper Mesopotamia from the Safavids. These areas changed hands several times over the following decades; however, the Ottoman hold would not be set until the 1555 Peace of Amasya following the Ottoman–Safavid War (1532–1555). Effective governmental rule and eyalets would not be established over these regions until the 1639 Treaty of Zuhab.

=== The Mamluks ===
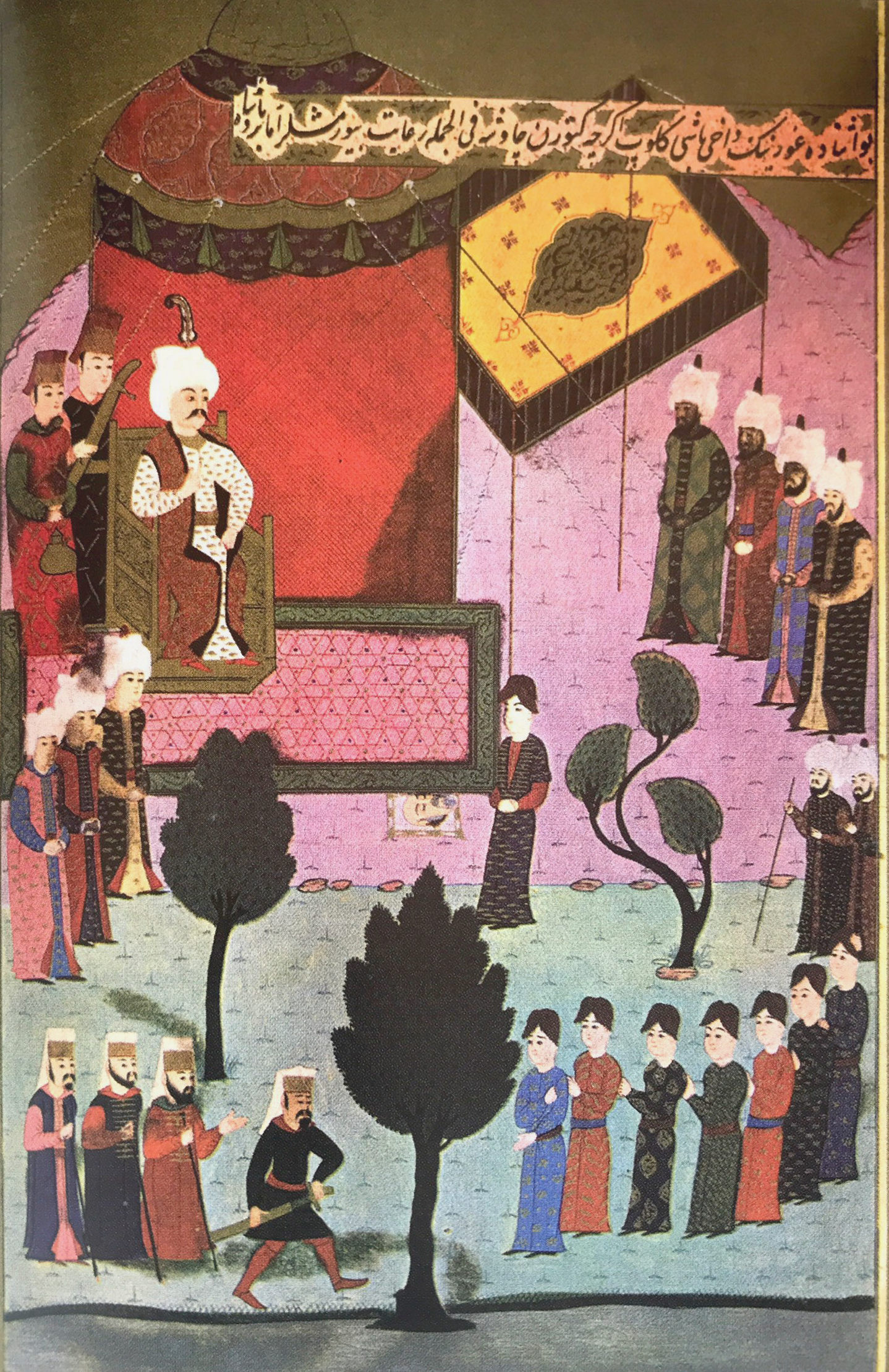
Ottoman painting showing the head of Mamluk Sultan al-Ghuri being remitted to Selim I

Sultan Selim then conquered the Mamluk Sultanate of Egypt, defeating the Mamluk Egyptians first at the Battle of Marj Dabiq (24th of August 1516), and then at the Battle of Ridaniya (22nd of January 1517). This led to the Ottoman annexation of the entire sultanate, from Syria and Palestine in Sham, to Hejaz and Tihamah in the Arabian Peninsula, and ultimately Egypt itself. This permitted Selim to extend Ottoman power to the Muslim holy cities of Mecca and Medina, hitherto under Egyptian rule. Rather than style himself the Ḥākimü'l-Ḥaremeyn, or The Ruler of The Two Holy Cities, he accepted the more pious title Ḫādimü'l-Ḥaremeyn, or The Servant of The Two Holy Cities.

==== Battle of Marj Dabiq ====
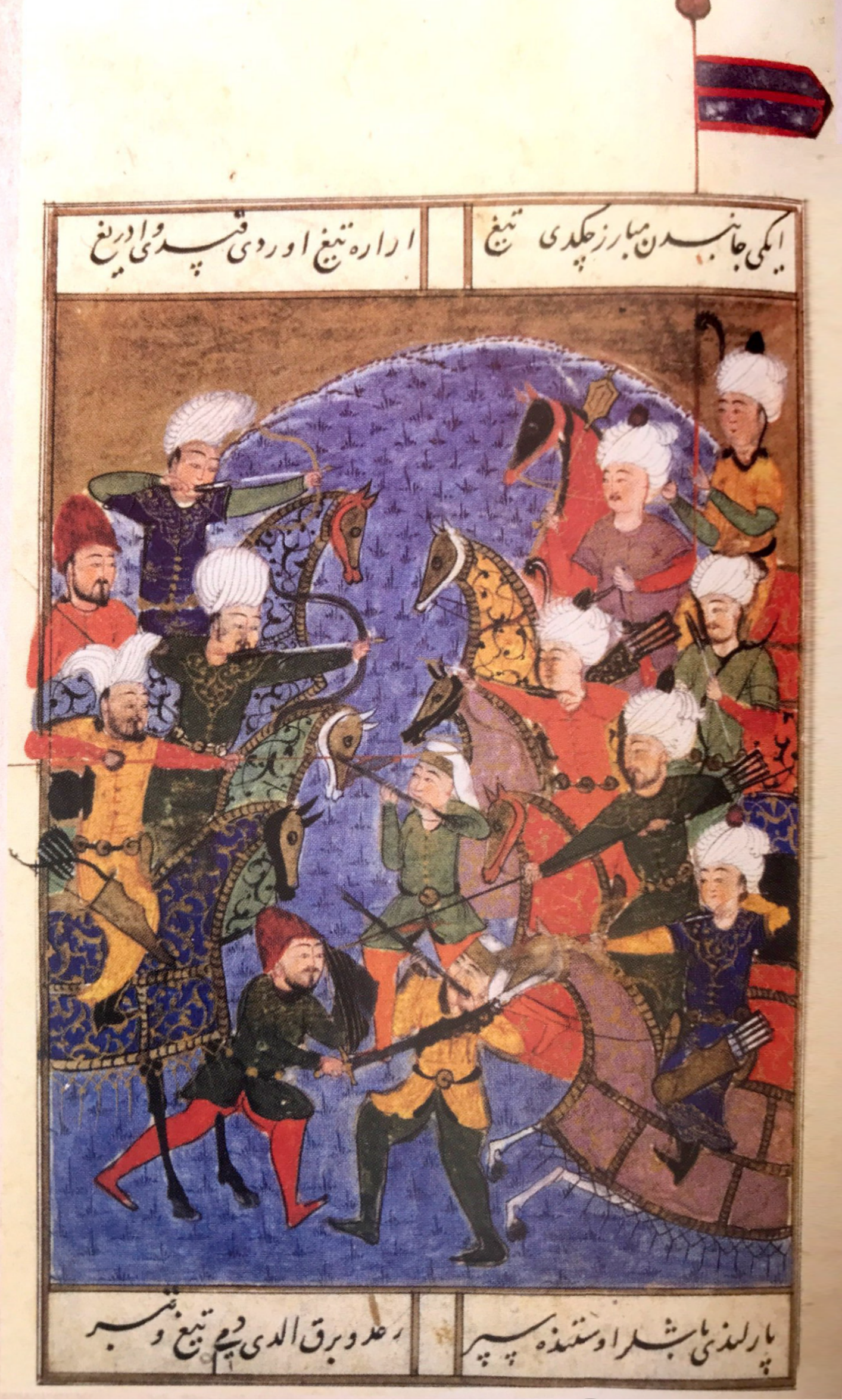
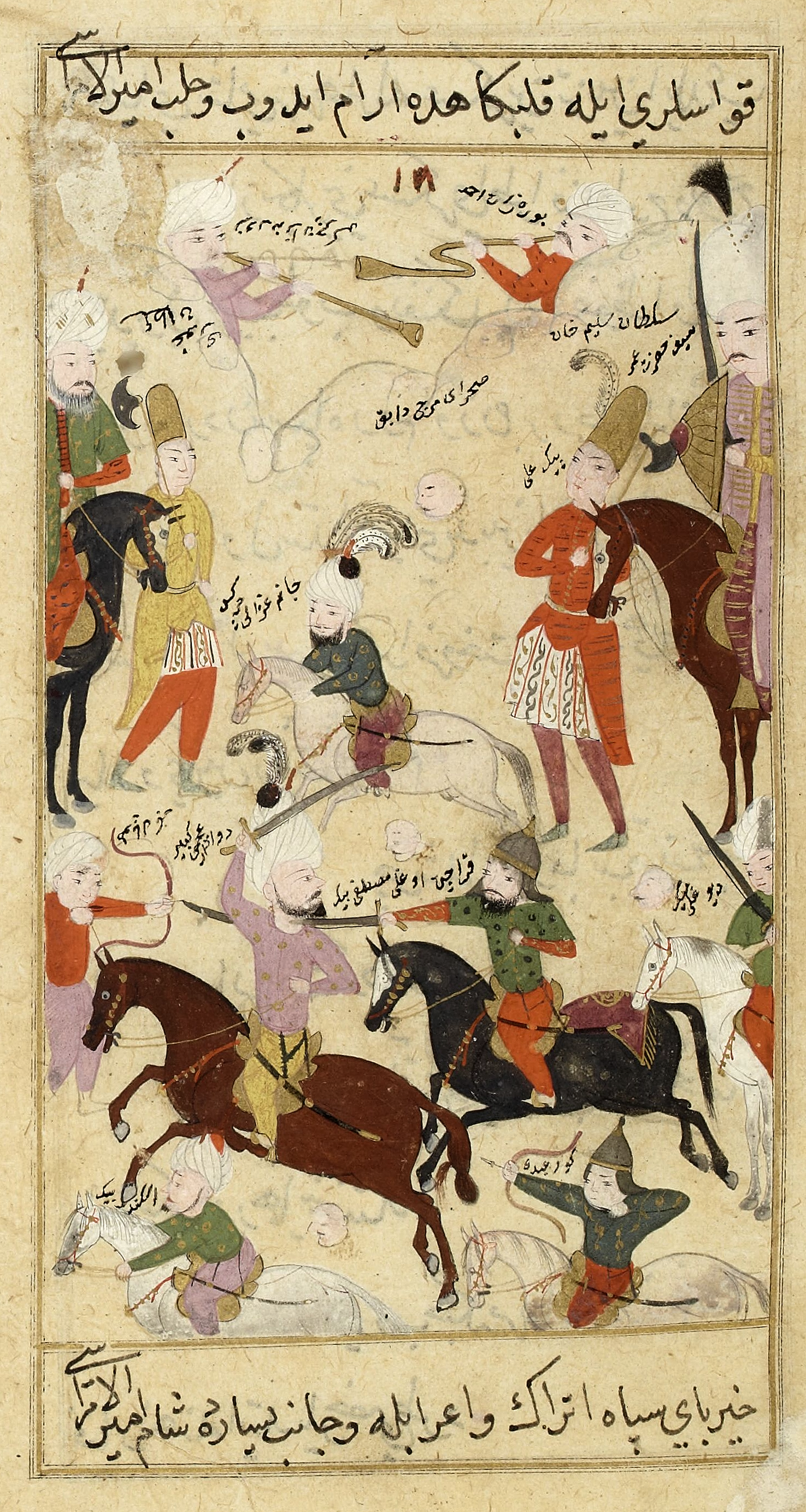
Miniature depicting the occurring battle at the time in Dabiq, fought between the Ottomans and the Mamluk armies, around 1516; miniature painting by Hoca Sadeddin Efendi.

Selim I launched an attack on the Mamluks in 1516. The Ottoman army and the Mamluk army met near Marj Dabiq. The Mamluk army advanced and on 20 August made camp at the plain of Marj Dabiq, a day's journey north of Aleppo. There, al-Ghawri and his men awaited the enemy's approach on this plain, where the sultanate's fate would soon be decided.

According to the History of Egypt composed by Muḥammad ibn Aḥmad ibn Iyas, the Mamluks arranged themselves with the Sultan occupying the center column. Sibay, the Governor of Damascus, commanded the right flank, and Khai'r Bey, governor of Aleppo, took the left.

The marshal Sûdûn Adjami was the first to enter combat, followed by Sibay, leading an experienced corps of veteran Mamluk warriors. They rushed into battle and managed to kill several thousand Ottoman soldiers in the first hours of fighting. This advantage forced the opposite Ottoman wing to begin a withdrawal, and the Mamluk forces under Sibay succeeded in taking several pieces of artillery and capturing some fusiliers. Selim considered retreat or requesting a truce.

It was at this point that the battle turned against the Mamluks. A rumor began to spread that al-Ghawri had ordered the recruits to hold their position, avoid combat, and leave the fighting to the veteran soldiers who were already engaged in battle. When Marshall Sûdûn Adjami and Sibay, who were leading the attack, were suddenly killed, panic broke out in the Mamluks' advancing right flank. Meanwhile, Khai'r Bey, in command of the left flank, called for a retreat. The fact that his forces were the first to quit the field was considered evidence of the man's betrayal.

Ibn Iyas offered the following account of the Mamluk defeat:

The sultan stood under his standard and called to his soldiers: "Aghas! This is the moment to take heart! Fight, and I will reward you!" But no one listened and the men fled from the battle. "Pray to God to give us victory!" Called al-Ghawri. This is the moment for prayer." But he found neither support nor defenders. He then began to feel an unquenchable fire. This was a particularly hot day, and an unusual fog of dust had risen between the armies. It was the day of God's anger directed against the Egyptian army, which stopped fighting. At the worst moment, and with the situation growing worse, the emir Timur Zardkash feared for the safety of the battle standard, lowered and stowed it, then came to find the sultan. He said to him: "Lord Sultan, the Ottoman army has defeated us. Save yourself and flee to Aleppo." When the sultan realized this, he was gripped by a sort of paralysis that affected the side of his body, and his jaw dropped open. He asked for water, which was brought to him in a golden goblet. He drank some, turned his horse to flee, advanced two paces, and fell from his saddle. After that, little by little, he surrendered his soul.

Selim I, welcomed by the inhabitants as a deliverer from the excesses of the Mamluks, entered Aleppo in triumph. He received the Abbasid caliph warmly, but upbraided the Islamic judges and jurists for their failure to check Mamluk misrule. Joined by Khai'r Bey and other Egyptian officers, he proceeded to the Citadel.

From Aleppo, he marched with his forces to Damascus, where terror prevailed. Beyond some attempts to protect the city by flooding the plain around, the remnants of the Mamluk forces had done nothing substantial to oppose the enemy. Discord amongst the emirs had paralyzed the army and prevented any decisive action that might have affected the subsequent course of events. Some of al-Ghawri's lieutenants supported Emir Janberdi Al-Ghazali as the new sultan, but others favoured the deceased ruler's son. As the Ottomans approached, however, resistance dissolved, as the remaining forces either went over to their side or fled to Egypt. Selim I entered Damascus in mid-October, and the inhabitants readily surrendered to the conquerors.

==== Battle of Ridaniya ====
Sultan Tuman bay II now resolved himself to march out as far as Salahia, and there meet the Ottomans wearied by the desert march; however, at the last he yielded to his Emirs who entrenched themselves at Ridaniya, a little way out of the city. By this time, the Ottomans were crossing the Sinai Peninsula and having reached Arish, were marching unopposed by Salahia and Bilbeis to Khanqah;

On the 20th of January, they reached Birkat al Hajj, a few hours from the Capital. Two days later the main body confronted the Egyptian entrenchment, while a party crossing Mocattam Hill took them in the flank. The Battle of Ridaniya was fought on the 22nd of January 1517. With a band of devoted followers, Tuman threw himself into the midst of the Ottoman ranks, and even reached Sinan Pasha's tent and personally killed him, thinking he was Selim.

But in the end the Egyptians were routed, and fled two miles up the Nile. The Ottomans then entered the City of Cairo unopposed. They took the Citadel and slew the entire Circassian garrison, while all around the streets became the scene of terrible outrage. Selim I himself occupied an island close to Bulac. The following day his Vizier, entering the city, endeavored to stop the wild rapine of the troops; and the Caliph Al-Mutawakkil III, who had followed in Selim's train, led the public service invoking blessing on his name. The Caliph's prayer as given by Ibn Ayas.

O Lord, uphold the Sultan, Monarch both of land and the two Seas; Conqueror of both Hosts; King of both Iracs [sic]; Minister of both Holy cities; the great Prince Selim Shah! Grant him Thy heavenly aid and glorious victories ! O King of the present and the future, Lord of the Universe!

==== Capture of Cairo (1517) ====
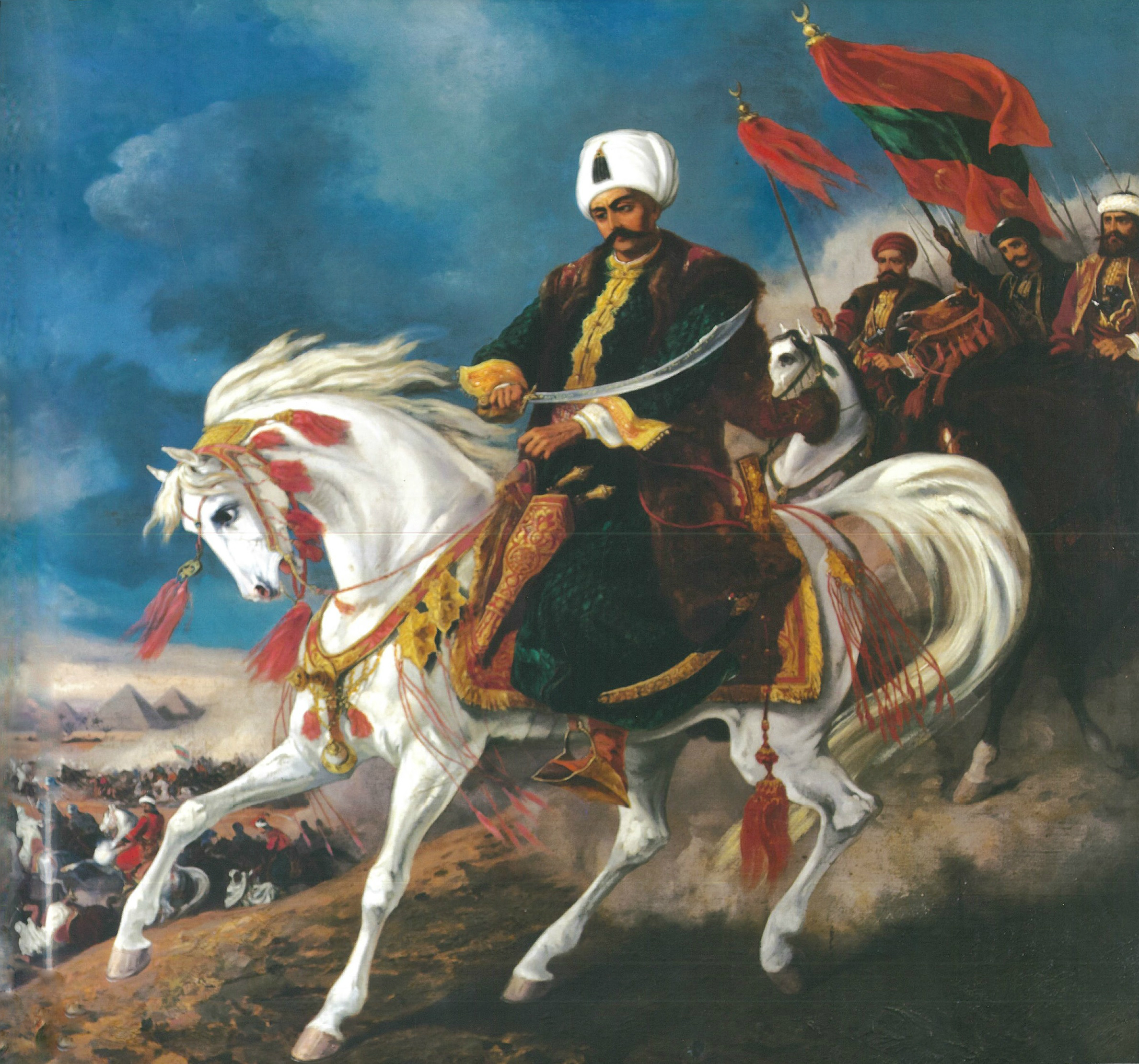
A modern painting depicting Selim I during the Egypt campaign, located in Army Museum, Istanbul

After the Battle of Ridaniya, Selim encamped on the island of Vustaniye (or Burac) facing Cairo, the capital. But he didn't enter the city. Because Tumanbay II the sultan of the Mamluks as well as Kayıtbay another leader of the Mamluks, had managed to escape. Selim decided to concentrate on arresting the leaders before entering Cairo. Thus he sent only a vanguard regiment to Cairo on the 26th of January.

Although the regiment was able to enter the capital without much fighting, the same night Tumanbay also secretly entered the capital. With the assistance of some Cairo citizens, he raided the Ottoman forces in the capital and began controlling Cairo.

==== Battle of Cairo (1517) ====
After hearing the news of Tumanbay's presence in Cairo, Selim sent his Janissaries to the city. After several days' fighting the Ottoman forces entered the city on the 3rd of February 1517. Selim entered the city and sent messages of victory (Turkish: Zafername; "Book of Victory") to other rulers about the conquest of Cairo. Nevertheless, the leaders of the Mamluks were still on the loose.

Tumanbay escaped from Cairo and tried to organize a new army composed of Egyptians together with what was left out of the Mamluk army. His army was smaller in size and capacity compared to the Ottoman army. But he was planning to raid Selim's camp on Vustatiye island. However, Selim heard about his plan and sent a force on Tumanbay to forestall his plans. After some small-scale clashes, Tumanbay was arrested on 26 March 1517. Selim's initial decision was to send Mamluk notables to İstanbul. But after a while, he changed his decision. Tumanbay and the other notable Mamluks were executed on the 13th of April 1517 at the Bab Zuweila by a former Mamluk commander who had switched sides.

=== Claiming the Caliphate ===
The last Abbasid caliph, al-Mutawakkil III, was residing in Cairo as a Mamluk puppet at the time of the Ottoman conquest. He was subsequently sent into exile in Istanbul. In the eighteenth century, a story emerged claiming that he had officially transferred his title to the Caliphate to Selim at the time of the conquest. In truth, Selim did not make any claim to exercise the sacred authority of the office of caliph, and the notion of an official transfer was a later invention.

Nonetheless, the transfer of Al-Mutawakkil to Istanbul, and his oath of allegiance to Selim I, established the Ottoman Caliphate, with the sultan as its head, thus transferring religious authority from the Abbasid Dynasty of Cairo, to the Ottomans of Istanbul.

=== Later Life ===
After conquering Damascus in 1516, Selim ordered the restoration of the tomb of Ibn Arabi (d. 1240), a famous Sufi master who was highly revered among Ottoman Sufis.

Mamluk culture and social organization persisted at a regional level, and the hiring and education of Mamluk "slave" soldiers continued, but the ruler of Egypt was an Ottoman governor protected by an Ottoman militia. The fall of the Mamluk Sultanate effectively put an end to the Portuguese–Mamluk naval war, but the Ottomans then took over the attempts to stop Portuguese expansion in the Indian Ocean.

The conquest of the Mamluk Empire also opened up the territories of Africa to the Ottomans. During the 16th century, Ottoman power expanded further west of Cairo, along the coasts of northern Africa. The corsair Hayreddin Barbarossa established a base in Algeria, and later accomplished the Conquest of Tunis in 1534.

Cairo remained in Ottoman hands until the 1798 French conquest of Egypt, when Napoleon I claimed to eliminate the Mamluks, although he was referring to slave soldiers, known as Mamluks, and not the Mamluk Sultanate, named after its Sultans who were formerly slaves.

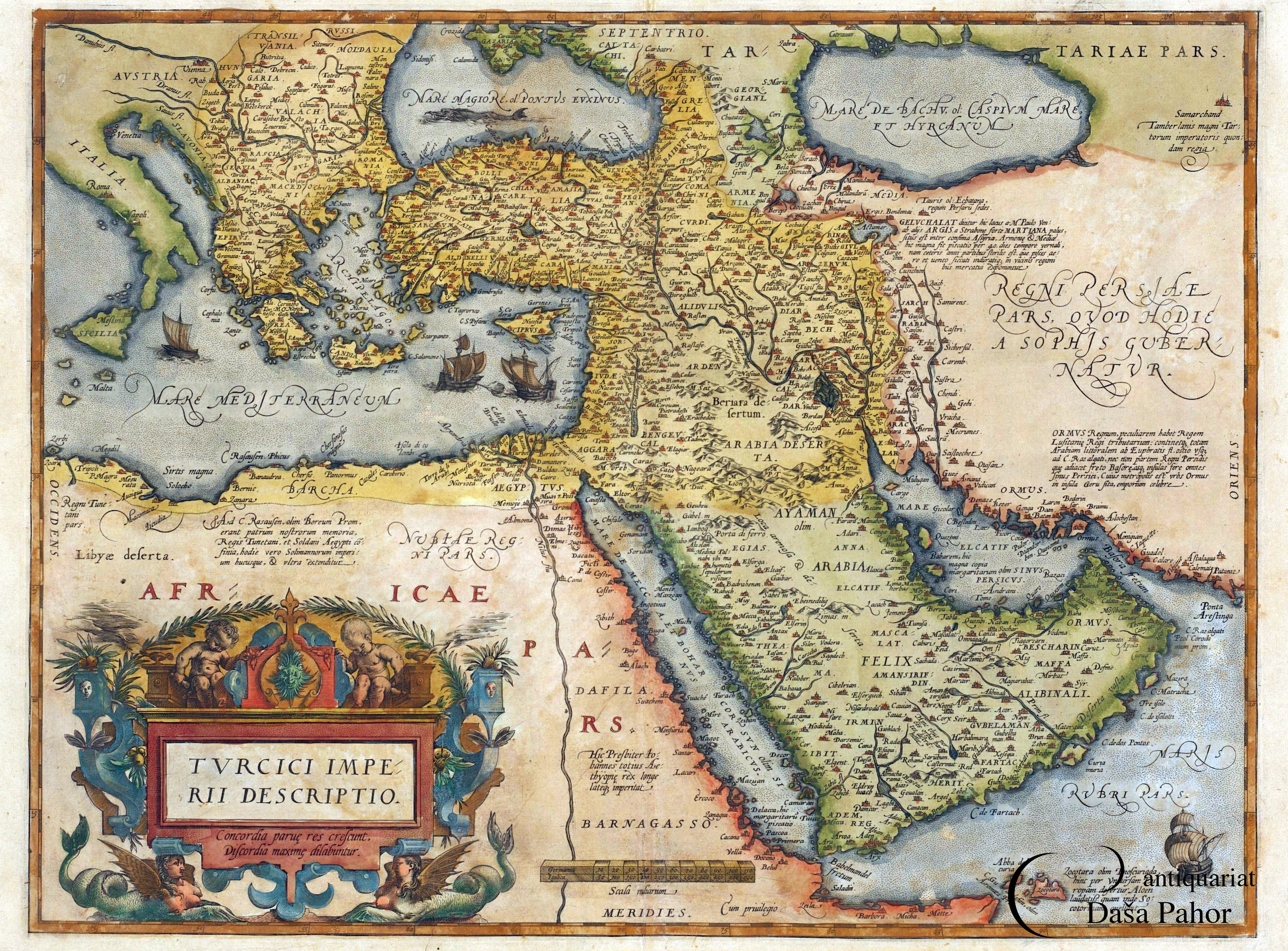
Outline of the Ottoman Empire, from the Theatro d'el Orbe de la Tierra de Abraham Ortelius, Antwerp, 1602, updated from the 1570 edition

The conquest of the Mamluks was the largest military venture an Ottoman sultan had ever undertook, or would ever undertake in the future. The conquest placed what were generally considered the two largest and most notable cities situated in Africa, the Middle East and in Europe at the time, Constantinople and Cairo, firmly into Ottoman hands. It was not since the height of the Roman Empire that an entity emerged which dominated the major seas of the region, the Black, Red, Caspian, and Mediterranean (Mare Nostrum) seas.

The conquest of Egypt proved extremely profitable for the empire as it produced more tax revenue than any other Ottoman territory and the incredibly fertile plains of the Nile supplied about 100% of all grain consumed at Istanbul.

However, it was not Cairo, Damascus, and Aleppo, but rather Mecca, Medina, and Jerusalem which were the most important cities seized by Selim in his conquest of the Mamluks. The Ottomans that succeeded him thus through him became Caliphs of the entire muslim world, and went on to hold that position for 4 centuries until the early 20th century.

== Foreign relations ==
=== Relations with Shah Ismail ===
While marching into the Safavid Empire in 1514, Selim's troops suffered from the scorched-earth tactics of Shah Ismail I. The sultan hoped to lure Ismail into an open battle before his troops starved to death, and began writing insulting letters to the Shah, accusing him of cowardice:

They, who by perjuries seize scepters ought not to skulk from danger, but their breast ought, like the shield, to be held out to encounter peril; they ought, like the helm, to affront the foeman's blow.

Ismail responded to Selim's third message, quoted above, by having an envoy deliver a letter accompanied by a box of opium. The Shah's letter insultingly implied that Selim's prose was the work of an unqualified writer on drugs. Selim was enraged by the Shah's denigration of his literary talent and ordered the Persian envoy to be torn to pieces.

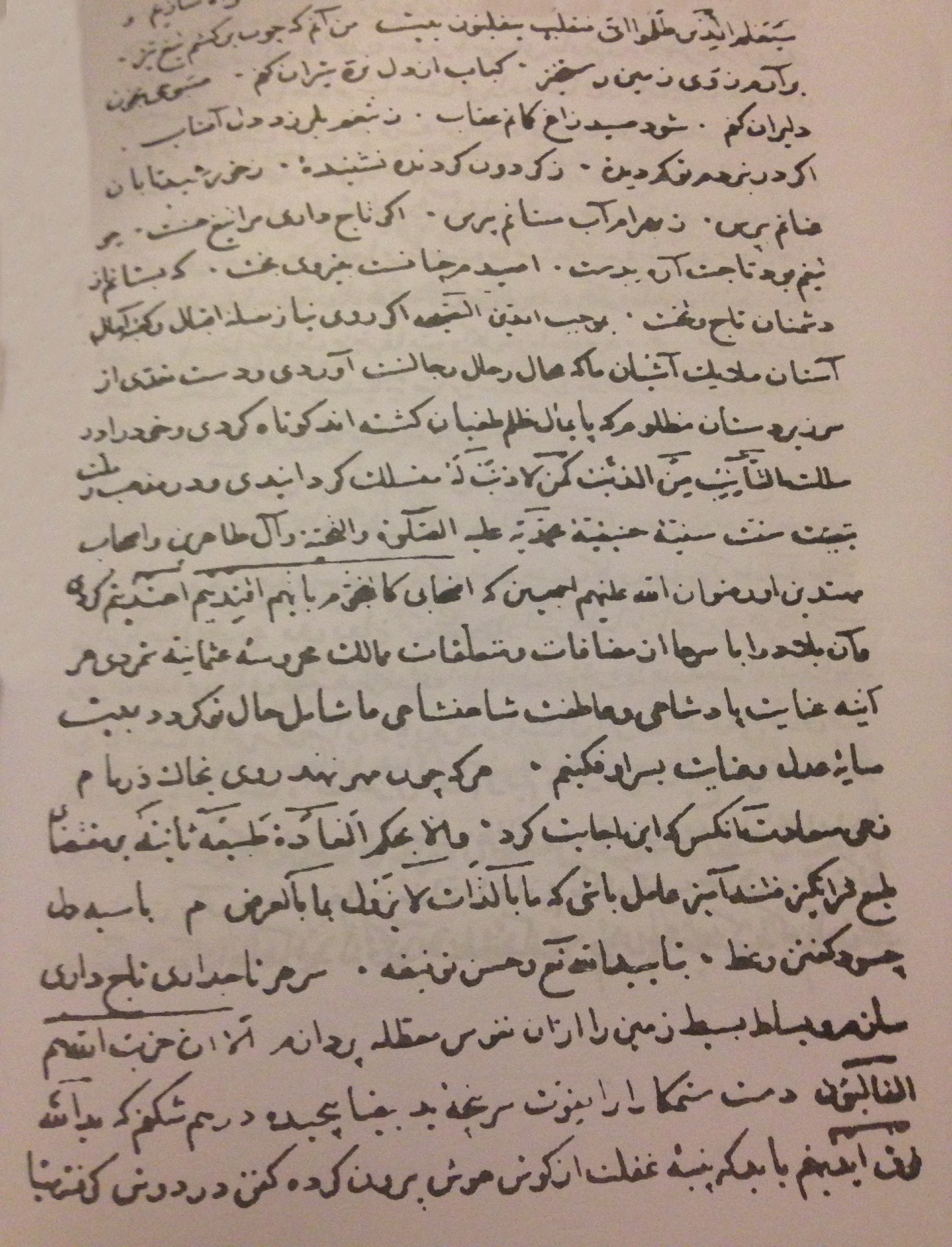
Copied of Selim's letters excerpting from original Selim I letters written by his companion, Feridun Ahmed Bey.

Outside of their military conflicts, Selim I and Shah Ismail clashed on the religious front as well. Opposed to Shah Ismail's adherence to the Shia sect of Islam (contrasting his Sunni beliefs), Selim I and his father before him "did not really accept his basic political and religious legitimacy," beginning the portrayal of the Safavids in Ottoman chronicles as kuffar. After the Battle of Chaldiran, Selim I's minimal tolerance for Shah Ismail I disintegrated, and he began a short era of closed borders with the Safavid Empire.

An economic war waged between them as well.

Selim I wanted to use the Ottoman Empire's central location to completely cut the ties between Shah Ismail's Safavid Empire and the rest of the world. Even though the raw materials for important Ottoman silk production at that time came from Persia rather than developed within the Ottoman Empire itself, he imposed a strict embargo on Iranian silk in an attempt to collapse their economy. For a short amount of time, the silk resources were imported via the Mamluk territory of Aleppo, but by 1517, Selim I had conquered the Mamluk state and trade fully came to a standstill. So strict was this embargo that, "merchants who had been incautious enough not to immediately leave Ottoman territory when war was declared had their goods taken away and were imprisoned," and to emphasize frontier security, sanjaks along the border between the two empires were given exclusively to Sunnis and those who did not have any relationship with the Safavid-sympathizing Qizilbash. Iranian merchants were barred from entering the borders of the Ottoman Empire under Selim I. Shah Ismail received revenue via customs duties, therefore after the war to demonstrate his commitment to their thorny rivalry, Selim I halted trade with the Safavids—even at the expense of his empire's own silk industry and citizens.

This embargo and closed borders policy was reversed quickly by his son, Suleiman the Magnificent, after Selim I's death in 1520.

=== Relations with Babur ===
Babur's early relations with the Ottomans were poor because Selim I provided Babur's Uzbek rival Ubaydullah Khan with powerful matchlocks and cannons. In 1507, when ordered to accept Selim I as his rightful suzerain, Babur refused and gathered Qizilbash servicemen in order to counter the forces of Ubaydullah Khan during the Battle of Ghazdewan in 1512.

In 1513, Selim I reconciled with Babur (fearing that he would join the Safavids), dispatched Ustad Ali Quli and Mustafa Rumi, and many other Ottoman Turks, in order to assist Babur in his conquests; this particular assistance proved to be the basis of future Mughal-Ottoman relations. From them, he also adopted the tactic of using matchlocks and cannons in field (rather than only in sieges), which would give him an important advantage in India.

This learned use of guns, which Babur passed down to his descendants, would lead to the formation of the largest muslim empire in the history of India, the Mughal Empire, which during the reign of his great great great grandson, Aurangzeb, reached its zenith, and controlled virtually the entire subcontinent through direct vassals and tributaries.

== Personality ==
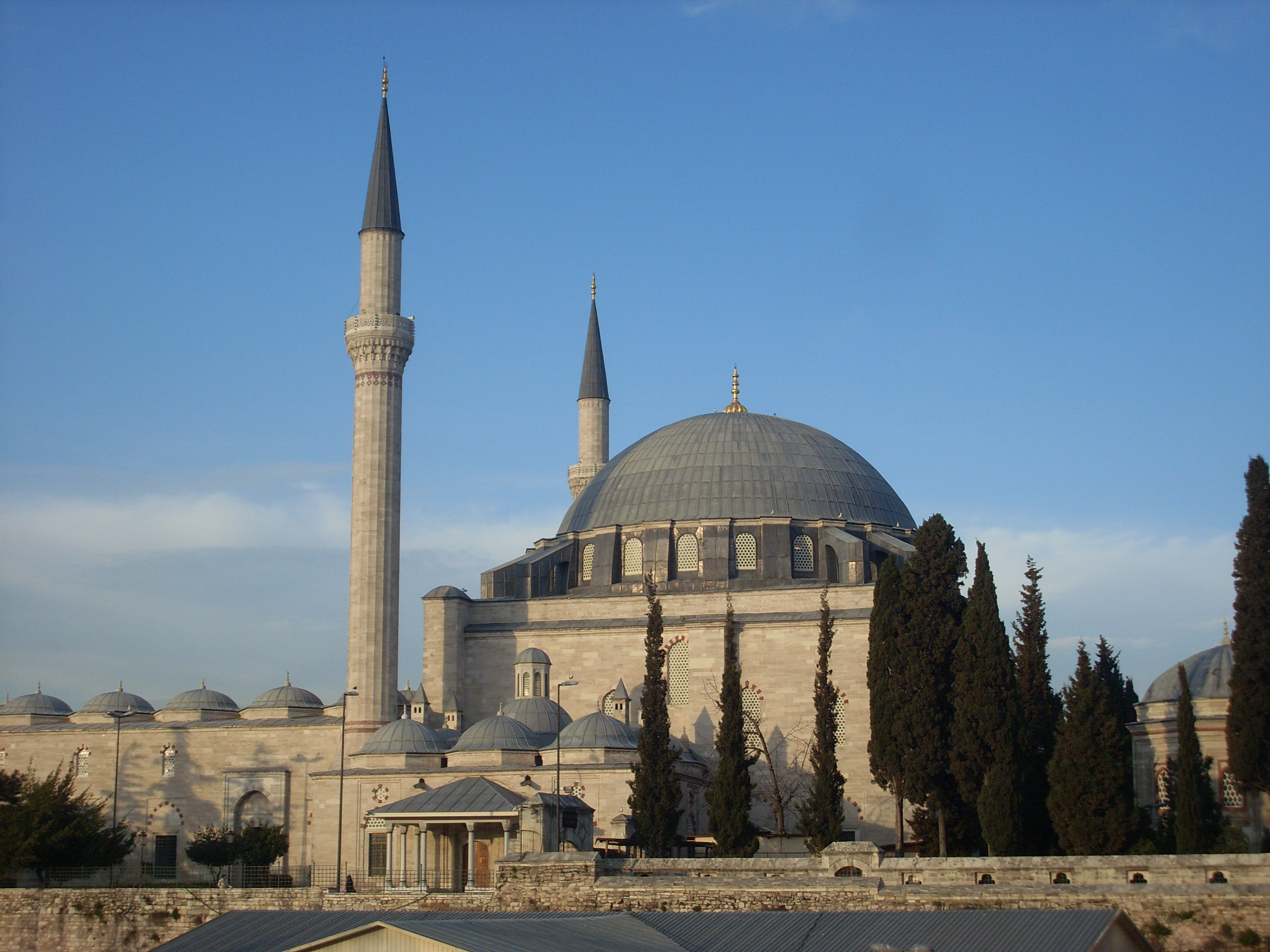
Yavuz Selim Mosque was commissioned by the Ottoman sultan Suleiman I in memory of his father Selim I, who died in 1520. The architect was Alaüddin (Acem Alisi).

By most accounts, Selim had a fiery temper and had very high expectations of those below him. Several of his viziers were executed for various reasons. A famous anecdote relates how one vizier playfully asked the Sultan for some preliminary notice of his doom so that he might have time to put his affairs in order. The Sultan laughed and replied that indeed he had been thinking of having the vizier killed but had no one fit to take his place, otherwise he would gladly oblige. A popular Ottoman curse was "May you be a vizier of Selim's!" in reference to the number of viziers he had executed.

Selim was one of the empire's most successful and respected rulers, being energetic and hardworking. During his short eight years of ruling, he accomplished momentous success. Despite the length of his reign, many historians agree that Selim prepared the Ottoman Empire to reach its zenith under the reign of his son and successor, Suleiman the Magnificent.

Selim was bilingual, and spoke both Turkish and Persian, with the Ottoman literary critic Latifî (died 1582) noting that he was "very fond of speaking Persian". He was also a distinguished poet who wrote both Turkish and Persian poetry under the nickname Mahlas Selimi; collections of his Persian poetry are extant today.

In a letter to his rival, Shah Ismail I, while equating himself with Alexander, Selim calls Ismail the "Darius of our days". Paolo Giovio, in a work written for Charles V, says that Selim holds Alexander the Great and Julius Caesar in the highest esteem above all the generals of old.

== Family ==
=== Consorts ===
Selim I had two known consorts:

- Hafsa Hatun, mother of Suleiman the Magnificent;
- Ayşe Hatun, was a Crimean princess, daughter of Meñli I Giray. She entered into Selim's harem after the death of her first consort, Selim's half-brother Şehzade Mehmed
- Unnamed Hatun, a concubine of Selim I and the mother of Üveys Pasha.

=== Sons ===
Selim I had at least six sons:

- Şehzade Salih (died 1499, buried in Gülbahar Hatun Mausoleum, Trabzon)
- Şehzade Orhan (? – before 1520)
- Şehzade Musa (? – before 1520)
- Şehzade Korkud (? – before 1520)
- Suleiman I (6 November 1494 – 6 September 1566) – with Hafsa Hatun. Also known as Suleiman the Magnificent, became sultan after his father's death.
- Üveys Pasha (c. 1512 – 1547). Illegitimate son, Governor of Ottoman Baghdad and Yemen.

=== Daughters ===
Selim I had at least nine daughters:

- Hatice Sultan (ante 1494 – post 1543/44) – daughter of Hafsa. Married twice, she had five sons and at least three daughters.
- Fatma Sultan (ante 1494 – c. 1566) – daughter of Hafsa. Married three times, possibly had two daughters.
- Hafize Hafsa Sultan (ante 1494 – 10 July 1538) – daughter of Hafsa. She married once.
- Beyhan Sultan (ante 1494 – 1559) – daughter of Hafsa. Called also Peykhan Sultan. Married in 1513 to Ferhad Pasha. She had at least one daughter, Esmehan Hanımsultan.
- Gevherhan Sultan (c. 1494 – after 1514). She Married in 1509 to her cousin Sultanzade Isfendiyaroglu Mehmed Bey (son of Sofu Fatma Sultan, daughter of Bayezid II), governor of Balıkesir. They had no known children and she was widowed in 1514 when Mehmed died at the Battle of Chaldiran. According to unsourced traditions, she remarried Saadet I, Crimean Khan of the Giray dynasty. If true, she was the mother of Saadet's son, Ahmed Pasha.
- Şah Sultan (c. 1500 – 1572), called also Devlet Şahihuban Sultan. married in 1523 to Lütfi Pasha (div.).
- Şahzade Sultan (? – ante 1517), known also as Sultanzade Sultan, she married Çoban Mustafa Pasha. She had at least one daughter, Ayşe Hanımsultan, who lived until 1556. After her death, her husband married her half-sister Hatice Sultan.
- Kamerşah Sultan (died on 27 September 1503 in Trabzon, buried in Gülbahar Hatun Mausoleum, Trabzon), called also Kamer Sultan;
- Yenişah Sultan (? – ?). She married Güzelce Mahmud Pasha.
- Hanım Sultan. Is uncertain of she was really existed or if Hanım is the second name of Hatice Sultan or Şahzade Sultan.

== Death and legacy ==
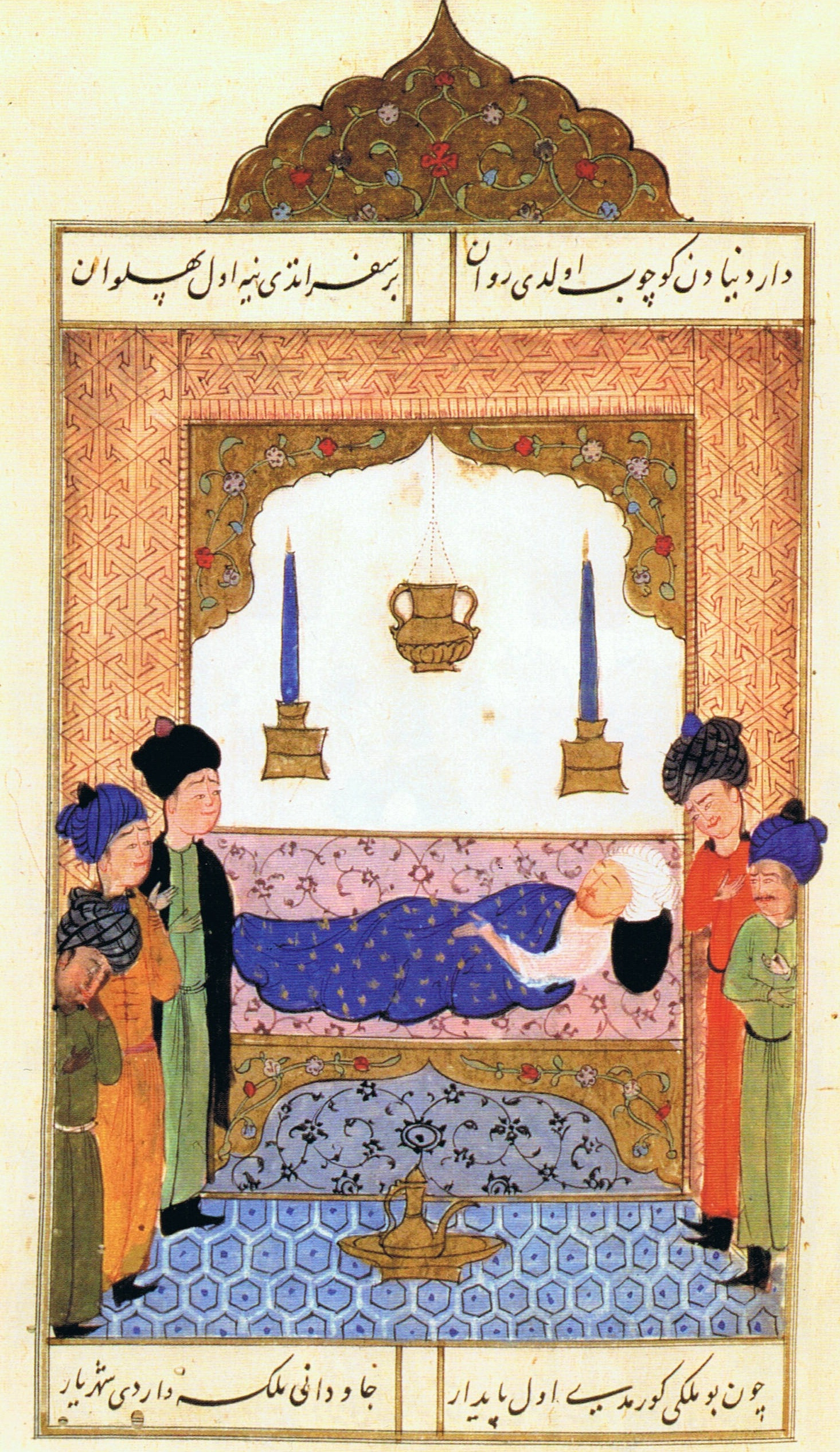
Selim I on his deathbed

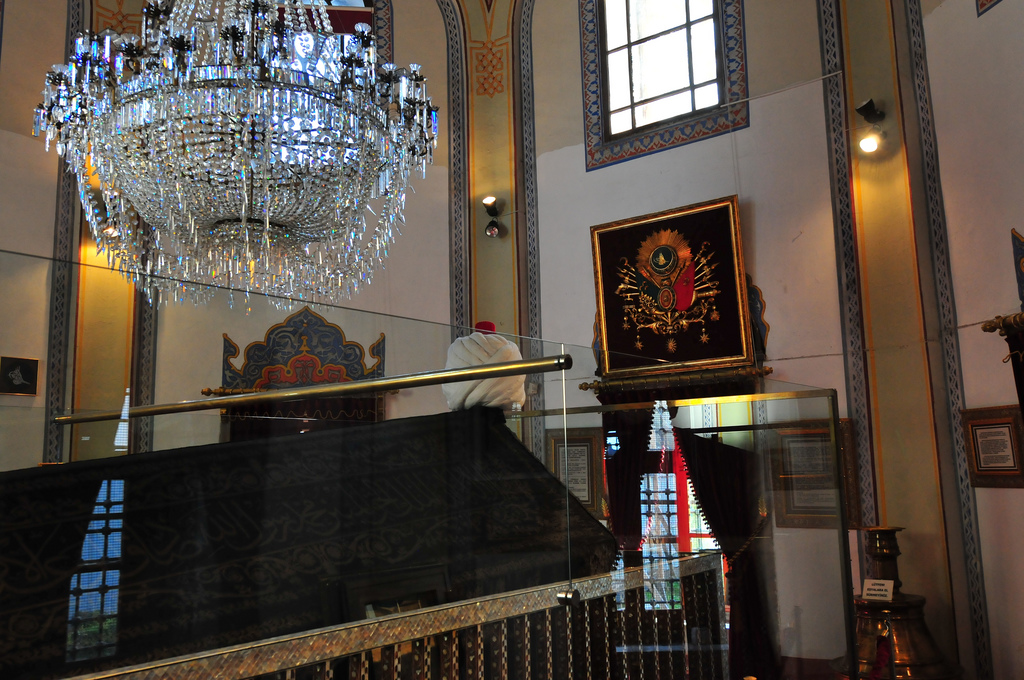
The türbe of Selim I in his mosque

Selim was in the midst of planning a campaign westward when he became overwhelmed by sickness and subsequently died in the ninth year of his reign, aged 49.

The official cause of death for the caliph was a mistreated carbuncle, although some historians suggest that he may have succumbed to cancer, or to poison administered by his physician.

Other historians have noted that Selim's death coincided with a period of plague in the empire, and have added that several sources imply that Selim himself suffered from the disease.

Selim passed away on the 22nd of September, 1520, his corpse was brought back to Istanbul, and he was buried in what came to be known as the Yavuz Selim Mosque, which his son and successor, Sultan Suleiman I, commissioned in his memory.

=== Legacy ===
Selim I left an enduring legacy in the wake of his death through his expansive conquests in the Middle East and Europe, greatly increasing the size of the Ottoman Empire by the end of his reign.

==== Popular culture ====
In popular culture Selim I appears in many shows and games. One example is the video game Assassin's Creed: Revelations, an action-adventure game where Selim I appears as an important character. In shows, such as Magnificent Century, Selim I is also portrayed in the television series, played by Muharrem Gülmez. In Kingdoms of Fire, Selim I is portrayed as a major antagonist, played by Mahmoud Nasr.

== See also ==
- Tuman bay II

== Bibliography ==
- This article incorporates text from a publication now in the public domain: Chisholm, Hugh, ed. (1911). "Selim". Encyclopædia Britannica. Vol. 24 (11th ed.). Cambridge University Press. pp. 606–607.
- Holt, P. M. (1967). "Sultan Selim I and the Sudan". Journal of African History. 8 (1): 19–23. doi:10.1017/S0021853700006794. S2CID 161275064.
- Karagoz, Huseyn Mirza (2017). "Alevism in Turkey: Tensions and patterns of migration". In Issa, Tözün (ed.). Alevis in Europe: Voices of Migration, Culture and Identity. Routledge.
- Mikaberidze, Alexander (2015). Historical Dictionary of Georgia (2nd ed.). Rowman & Littlefield. ISBN 978-1442241466.
- Mikhail, Alan (2020). God's Shadow: Sultan Selim, His Ottoman Empire, and the Making of the Modern World. Liveright. ISBN 978-1-631-49239-6.
- Necipoğlu, Gülru (2005). The Age of Sinan: Architectural Culture in the Ottoman Empire. London: Reaktion Books. ISBN 978-1-86189-253-9.
- Savory, Roger (2007). Iran Under the Safavids. Cambridge: Cambridge University Press. ISBN 978-0521042512.
- Tucker, Ernest (2012). "5: The Evolution of Ottoman-Iranian Diplomacy through the Safavid Era.". In Floor, Willem M; Herzig, Edmund (eds.). Iran and the World in the Safavid Age. International Library of Iranian Studies; 2. London; New York: I.B. Tauris and Iran Heritage Foundation.
- Faroqhi, Suraiya (2012). "13: Trade between the Ottomans and Safavids: The Acem Tϋccari and Others.". In Floor, Willem M; Herzig, Edmund (eds.). Iran and the World in the Safavid Age. International Library of Iranian Studies; 2. London; New York: I.B. Tauris and Iran Heritage Foundation.

Selim I House of Osman Born: 1470/1 Died: 22 September 1520
Regnal titles
| Preceded by Bayezid II | Sultan of the Ottoman Empire; 25 April 1512 – 22 September 1520 | Succeeded by Suleiman I |
Sunni Islam titles
| Preceded by al-Mutawakkil III as Caliph of Cairo | 1st Caliph of the Ottoman dynasty 1517–1520 | Succeeded by Suleiman I |
