= Dukakinzade Mehmed Pasha =

Ottoman statesman

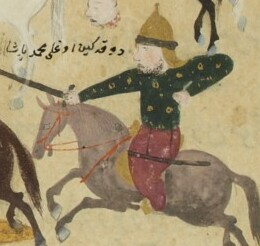
Dukakinoğlu Mehmed Pasha in Taj al-Tewarih by Hoja Sa'd al-Din

Dukakinzade Mehmed Pasha or Dukakinoğlu Mehmed Pasha was an Ottoman Albanian statesman who served as the beylerbey of Aleppo, Egypt, and Smederevo. He was the son of Dukaginzade Ahmed Pasha, Ottoman grand vizier of Albanian origin from the noble Dukagjini family.

He also was the grandson of the Albanian nobleman Nicholas Pal Dukagjini.

== Family ==
He married Gevherimüluk Sultan, daughter of Bayezid II. They had two children:

- Sultanzade Mehmed Ahmed Bey (died in 1537). In 1503 he married his cousin Ayşe Hanzade Mihrihan Hanımsultan, daughter of Ayşe Sultan. They had a daughter, Mihrimah Hanim.
- Neslişah Hanımsultan (1507 – 1579). She married her half-uncle Dukaginzade Ibrahim Bey. In 1522 she commisionated a mosque.

== See also ==
- List of Ottoman governors of Egypt

== Bibliography ==
- Özcan, Abdülkadir (1994). "Dukakinzâde Ahmed Paşa". TDV Encyclopedia of Islam, Vol. 9 (Dârüsaâde – Dulkadi̇roğulları) (in Turkish). Istanbul: Presidency of Religious Affairs, Centre for Islamic Studies. pp. 550–551. ISBN 978-975-389-436-4.
