= Mesih Pasha =

Grand Vizier of the Ottoman Empire from 1499 to 1501

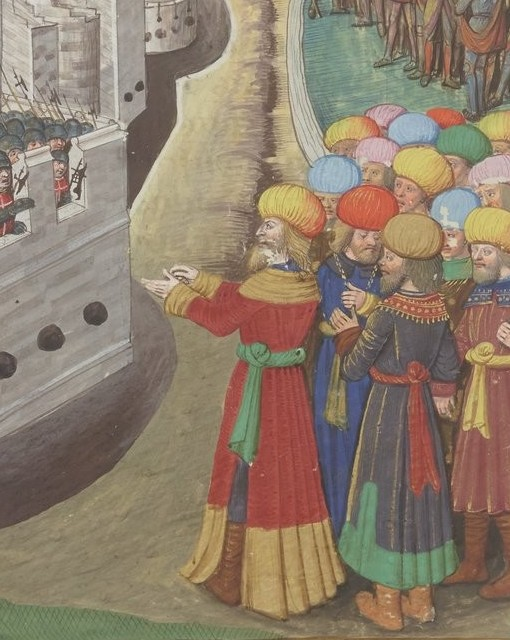
- Mesih Pasha in a miniature depicting the Siege of Rhodes

Grand Vizier of the Ottoman Empire
- In office 1499–1501
- Monarch: Bayezid II
- Preceded by: İbrahim Pasha
- Succeeded by: Hadım Ali Pasha

Personal details
- Born: 1443
- Died: November 1501 (aged 58)
- Relations: Hass Murad Pasha (brother); Constantine XI Palaiologos (uncle, uncertain)
- Children: Ali Bey; Mahmud Çelebi; Bâlî Bey
- Family: Palaiologos dynasty

Military service
- Allegiance: Ottoman Empire
- Years of service: 1470–1501
- Battles/wars: Siege of Negroponte, Siege of Rhodes (1480), Moldavian Campaign (1497–1499), Ottoman–Venetian War (1463–79), Ottoman–Venetian War (1499–1503)

Mesih Pasha or Misac Pasha (1443–1501) was an Ottoman statesman of Byzantine Greek origin, being a nephew of the last Roman emperor, Constantine XI Palaiologos. He served as Kapudan Pasha of the Ottoman Navy and was grand vizier of the Ottoman Empire in 1501.

== Life ==
=== Origin and early life ===
Mesih was related to the Palaiologoi, the last ruling dynasty of the Byzantine Empire. According to the 16th-century Ecthesis Chronica, he was the son of a certain Gidos Palaiologos, identified by the contemporary Historia Turchesca (attributed to Donado da Lezze or Giovanni Maria Angiolello) as a brother of a Byzantine emperor. This emperor is commonly held to have been Constantine XI Palaiologos, the last Byzantine emperor, who was killed in 1453 during the Fall of Constantinople to the Ottoman Sultan Mehmed II, commonly known as Mehmed the Conqueror or Sultan Mehmed Fatih. If true, since Constantine XI died childless, and had the Ottomans failed to conquer Constantinople, Mesih or his brother Hass Murad Pasha might have succeeded him. Instead, Mesih rose to become one of the most powerful men in the state that destroyed the Byzantine Empire. The Byzanto-Italian chronicler Theodore Spandounes, who claimed that Mesih was the brother of his own paternal grandmother, wrote that Mesih was ten years old at the time of Constantinople's fall. He and two of his brothers, including Hass Murad, were captured, converted to Islam, and raised as pages under the auspices of Sultan Mehmed II, as part of the devşirme system. In addition, through his mother, he was related to the Venetian noble Contarini family.

=== Career ===
Mesih is first attested in historical accounts in 1470, by which time he was the sanjak bey of Gallipoli. As the chief Ottoman naval base, the post also entailed command over much of the Ottoman fleet. In this capacity he distinguished himself in the Ottoman conquest of Euboea (medieval Negroponte) from the Venetians during the Ottoman–Venetian War of 1463–1479. However, Venetian archives document that soon after he offered to surrender Gallipoli and its fleet to Venice, in exchange for 40,000 gold ducats and the possibility to become ruler over the Morea (the Peloponnese peninsula in southern Greece), which had long been a semi-autonomous despotate under the Palaiologoi emperors.

Mesih was raised to the rank of vizier in the central imperial government (the Imperial Council or divan) in 1476 or early 1477; contemporary documents show him already as second vizier in 1478, but the Historia Turchesca records that he was "newly appointed" as fourth vizier in 1480, when he was given command of the Ottoman army and navy during the siege of Rhodes in 1480. His failure to take Rhodes led to his dismissal from the vizierate, but he retained his governorship of Gallipoli and his post as commander-in-chief of the navy. The late 16th-century historian Münejjim Bashi includes Mesih among Mehmed II's Grand Viziers, but this is most likely a confusion due to his post as vizier during this period.

==== Rise under Bayezid II ====
Following the death of Sultan Mehmed Fatih, the leading devşirme military officials were able to place Bayezid II on the throne. As a leading member of this faction, Mesih returned to the divan as vizier. Relying on the support of the Janissaries, the chief devşirme leader, the Grand Vizier Gedik Ahmed Pasha, flaunted his power and was said to be sympathetic to Bayezid's rival half-brother, Cem. Mesih, on the other hand, was careful to earn Bayezid's trust and opposing Cem's claims. In summer 1482, Bayezid had Gedik Ahmed imprisoned in the palace. In response, the enraged Janissaries invaded the palace, and Mesih was sent to negotiate with them. He was able to appease them by promising, among other things, that only members of the devşirme would become viziers. Mesih thus demonstrated both his loyalty and his diplomatic skills, and managed to become one of a small group of devşirme officials who henceforth came to dominate the divan. In order to counterbalance them, Bayezid began sending trusted chief eunuchs (kapi aghas) to important provincial governorships.

Mesih's diplomatic credentials were further burnished when Cem fled to the Knights Hospitaller in Rhodes. In the ensuing negotiations, Gedik Ahmed took up an intransigent stance, but Mesih managed to find a mutually acceptable compromise, further elevating him in the eyes of the Sultan. Mesih's support within the palace allowed him to weather the deposition and execution of Gedik Ahmed on 18 November 1482. By February 1483, he had advanced to second vizier within the divan. Some sources suggest that he succeeded Ishak Pasha as Grand Vizier in autumn 1483, remaining in the post until 1485, but most historians consider that Davud Pasha held the position during that time, with Mesih as his deputy, as is recorded in contemporary documents.

==== Disgrace and restoration to favour ====
For unknown reasons, in January 1485 Mesih fell into disfavour with Bayezid and was dismissed again from the vizierate, being demoted to subashi (town governor) of Filibe. He was then sent to Kaffa, a popular place of exile for disgraced officials, as its sanjak bey. He probably remained there until replaced in 1489, and is next mentioned in 1497 as sanjak bey of Akkerman. In the latter post he was instrumental in stopping a Polish invasion of Moldavia during the Polish–Ottoman War (1485–1503)), and regained imperial favour by dispatching captured Polish nobles and 29 captured standards to Bayezid.

Following his victory, Mesih performed the pilgrimage to Mecca in 1499. This seems to confirm reports of Mesih's religiosity—Spandounes wrote that "he was a fierce enemy of the Christians"—particularly since no other Ottoman viziers or sultans of the period performed the pilgrimage due to the heavy demands of office. In addition, as Halil İnalcık suggests, the pilgrimage was an excellent excuse to leave his post and visit Constantinople, where to work for his recall. Indeed, with another Ottoman–Venetian war having broken out, Mesih's naval expertise and knowledge of the Venetians led to his reinstatement as second vizier in the divan upon his return from Mecca, under the Grand Vizier Yakub Pasha.

==== Grand Vizierate and death ====
In spring 1501, Mesih was named Grand Vizier, and left Constantinople to suppress the rebellion by the Warsak tribe in Anatolia which was supporting a Karamanid pretender known as Mustafa. Through his diplomatic skills, Mesih was able to persuade the Warsaks to end their support of Mustafa. Upon his return to Constantinople, the Franco-Venetian invasion of Lesbos occurred, which so infuriated Bayezid that he struck Mesih with his bow. Shortly afterward, Mesih was injured while supervising the suppression of a fire in Galata, and died of his wounds (November 1501).

He was buried in a mosque erected by his brother in the Aksaray district of Constantinople, which Mesih had completed after Hass Murad's death in battle. Mesih had also established a mosque in Gallipoli in c. 1478.

== Family ==
Mesih had three known sons: Ali Bey, Mahmud Çelebi, and Bali Bey, who served as sanjak bey of Vulçitrin in 1503.

In 1506 Ali Bey married in second marriage Fatma Hanımsultan, daughter of Ayşe Sultan, and they had a son, Ahmed Bey, who married his cousin, the daughter of Fatma Sultan.

Ali Bey had also a son by his first marriage, named Ahmed Bey too. In 1506 he married Fatma's sister, Kamerşah Hanımsultan.

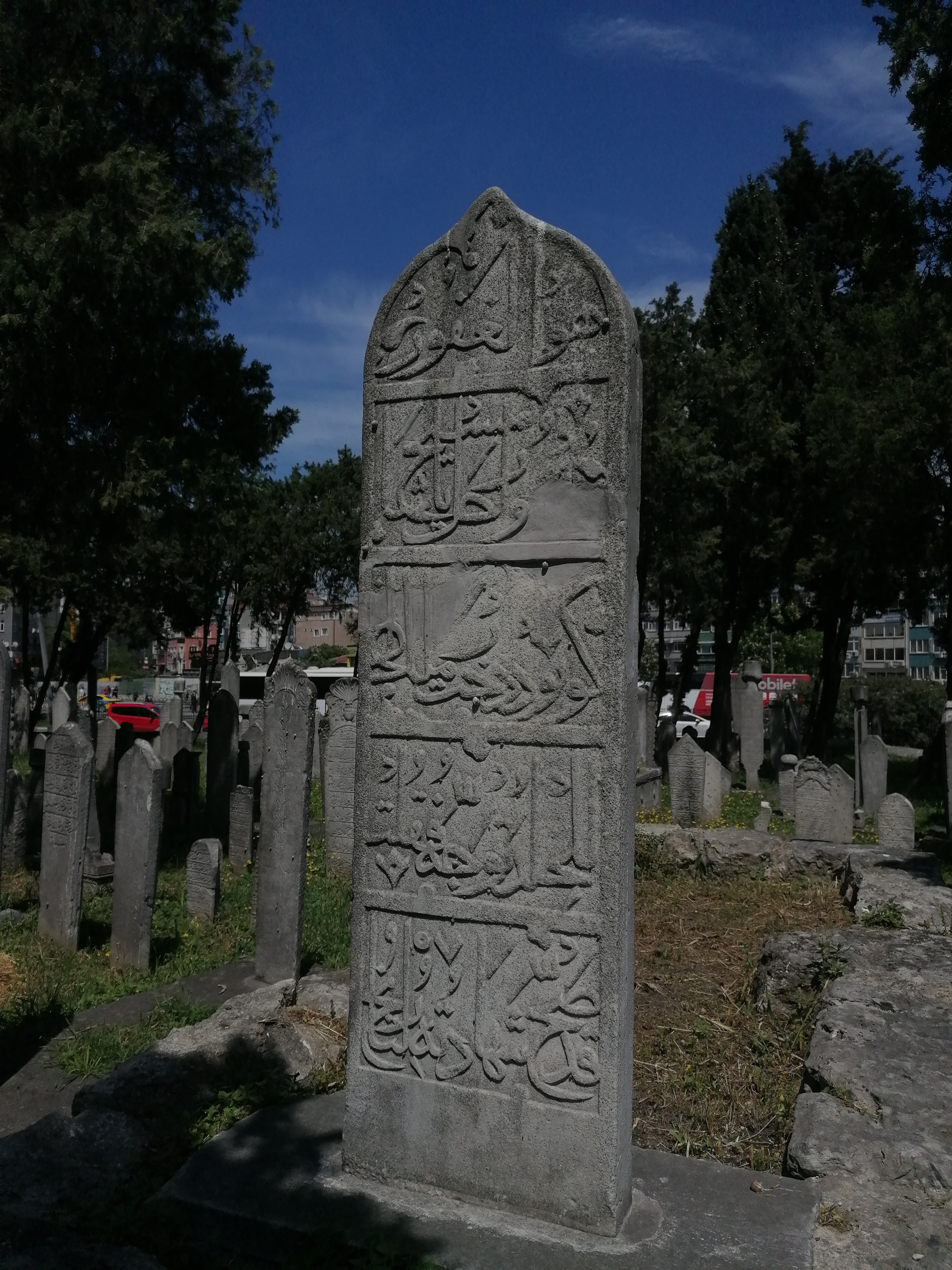
Tombstone of Mesih Pasha located in the Murat Paşa Mosque cemetery in Aksaray Istanbul

== Sources ==
- İnalcık, Halil (1991). "Mesīḥ Pasha". In Bosworth, C. E.; van Donzel, E. & Pellat, Ch. (eds.). The Encyclopaedia of Islam, Second Edition. Volume VI: Mahk–Mid. Leiden: E. J. Brill. pp. 1025–1026. ISBN 978-90-04-08112-3.
- Lowry, Heath W. (2003). The Nature of the Early Ottoman State. Albany, NY: State University of New York Press.
- Reindl, Hedda (1983). Männer um Bāyezīd: eine prosopographische Studie über die Epoche Sultan Bāyezīds II. (1481-1512). Berlin: K. Schwarz. OCLC 738694918.
- Stavrides, Théoharis (2001). The Sultan of Vezirs: The Life and Times of the Ottoman Grand Vezir Mahmud Pasha Angelovic (1453–1474). Brill. ISBN 978-90-04-12106-5.

Political offices
Preceded by Çandarlı Ibrahim Pasha the Younger	Grand Vizier of the Ottoman Empire; 1499-1501	Succeeded by Hadım Ali Pasha
