= Dukaginzade Ahmed Pasha =

Grand Vizier of the Ottoman Empire from 1514 to 1515

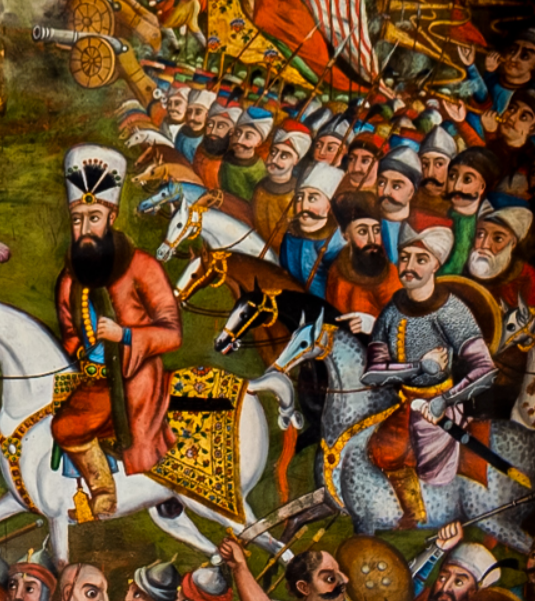
- Dukaginzade Ahmed Pasha leading troops during the Battle of Chaldiran

Grand Vizier of the Ottoman Empire
- In office 18 December 1514 – 4 March 1515
- Monarch: Selim I
- Preceded by: Hersekzade Ahmed Pasha
- Succeeded by: Hersekzade Ahmed Pasha

Personal details
- Born: c. mid 1400s Albanian League (modern day Albania)
- Died: 4 March 1515 Amasya, Ottoman Empire
- Spouse(s): Fülane Hatun; Gevherşah Hanımsultan; Hafize Sultan
- Relations: Dukagjini family Arianiti family
- Children: Dukakinzade Mehmed Pasha; Dukaginzade Ibrahim Pasha; Fatma Hanim
- Parents: Nicholas Paul Dukagjini (father); Kiranna Arianiti Comnena (mother)

Dukaginzade Ahmed Pasha or Dukaginoğlu Ahmed Pasha (Albanian: Ahmed Pashë Dukagjini; Ottoman Turkish: دوقکین زاده أحمد پاشا; Turkish: Dukakinoğlu Ahmed Paşa; died 1515), born Progon Dukagjini, was a high-ranking statesman and military commander of the Ottoman Empire in the early 16th century. He hailed from the Albanian Dukagjini family, one of the strongest in pre-Ottoman medieval Albania. Dukaginzade Ahmed Pasha was the son of Nicholas Pal Dukagjini and Kiranna Arianiti Comnena.

== Life ==
By 1503, he had become Sanjak-bey of Ankara. Dukaginzade Ahmed Pasha was one of the commanders who supported Selim in the Ottoman succession dispute. In 1511, as a result of the large revolt of the Janissary, he became beylerbey of Anatolia. In his new position, he played an instrumental role in securing that Selim would be the next Sultan in 1512 and had an important impact in the military victory against Şehzade Ahmed (Selim's half-brother) the pretender to the Ottoman throne on 15 April 1513 in Yenişehir. Dukaginzade Ahmed Pasha may have been the commander who captured Şehzade Ahmed in the battle.

By the summer of 1513, he became joined as a vizier (minister) in the Imperial Council (diwan) and was responsible for the negotiations with Venice about possible Ottoman support to Venice against H.R.E. Charles V. In 1514, Selim I began his campaign against the Safavids which culminated in the Battle of Chaldiran. At the beginning of the campaign, Dukaginzade Ahmed Pasha was at the head of the vanguard of 20,000 sipahi. His activity in the early stages of the campaign in contemporary sources is unclear, but in the battle of Chaldiran on 23 August 1514 he and the other viziers were at the centre of the battle line next to Selim. Around 7 September, when the Ottoman army reached Tabriz, the Safavid capital, Dukaginzade was in the delegation which went ahead of the army in order to accept the city's surrender to Selim.

He was Grand Vizier of the empire from 18 December 1514 to 4 March 1515. Then he was executed by Selim I, who thought that he was involved in the ongoing revolt of the janissaries. His son, Dukakinzade Mehmed Pasha, was a governor in several regions including Egypt Eyalet. He built the Al-Adiliyah Mosque complex in Aleppo, Syria where his family was based. The El Adli Dukaginzade are his descendants.

In Ottoman sources, Dukaginzade have been used to refer to him.

== Family ==
Dukaginzade Ahmed Pasha had three wife:

- Fülane Hatun. His first unknown wife. By her had a son:
  - Dukaginzade Mehmed Pasha. He married Gevherimüluk Sultan, daughter of Bayezid II. They had two children:
    - Sultanzade Mehmed Ahmed Bey (dead in 1537). In 1503 he married his cousin Ayşe Hanzade Mihrihan Hanımsultan, daughter of Ayşe Sultan. They had a daughter, Mihrimah Hanım.
    - Neslişah Hanımsultan (1507 – 1579). She married her half-uncle Dukaginzade Ibrahim Bey. In 1522, she commisionated a mosque.
- Gevherşah Hanımsultan. She was daughter of Ayşe Sultan, daughter of Bayezid II. They divorced before 1511. They had two children:
  - Dukaginzade Ibrahim Bey (died in 1582). He married his niece Neslişah Hanımsultan;
  - Fatma Hanım. In 1518 she married Iskender Bey, sanjak-bey of Antalya.
- Hafize Sultan. Daughter of Selim I, son and successor of Bayezid II. They married in 1511.

== Ancestry ==
Ancestors of Dukaginzade Ahmed Pasha

8. Tanush Dukagjini
Paul Dukagjini
Nicholas Paul Dukagjini
Komnen Arianiti
Nicholas Zaharia's daughter
Dukaginzade Ahmed Pasha
Komnen Arianiti
Gjergj Arianiti
Nicholas Zaharia's daughter
Kiranna Arianiti
Andrea III Muzaka
7. Maria Muzaka
Kiranna Zenevisi

== See also ==
- List of Ottoman grand viziers
- Dukakinzade Yahya bey

== Sources ==
=== Bibliography ===
- Sebastian, Peter (1988). Turkish prosopography in the Diarii of Marino Sanuto, 1496-1517. University of London.
- Necipoğlu, Gülru (2005). The Age of Sinan: Architectural Culture in the Ottoman Empire. London: Reaktion Books. ISBN 978-1-86189-253-9.

Political offices
| Preceded by Hersekzade Ahmed Pasha | Grand Vizier of the Ottoman Empire; 18 December 1514 – 8 September 1515 | Succeeded by Hersekzade Ahmed Pasha |
