= Şehzade Şehinşah =

Ottoman prince, son of Bayezid II and Hüsnüşah Hatun

- Born: c. 1470; Amasya, Ottoman Empire
- Died: 2 July 1511 (aged 40–41); Konya, Ottoman Empire
- Burial: Muradiye Complex, Bursa
- Consort: Mükrime Hatun
- Issue: Şehzade Mehmed Şah; Şehzade Alaeddin; Şehzade Mahmud; Şehzade Mustafa; Şehzade Orhan; Fülane Sultan
- Dynasty: Ottoman
- Father: Bayezid II
- Mother: Hüsnüşah Hatun
- Religion: Sunni Islam

Şehzade Şehinşah (Ottoman Turkish: شهزاده شھنشاہ; c. 1470 – 2 July 1511) was an Ottoman prince, son of Sultan Bayezid II and his consort Hüsnüşah Hatun.

== Early life ==
Şehzade Şehinşah was born in 1470 in Amasya. His father was Şehzade Bayezid (later Bayezid II) and his mother was Hüsnüşah Hatun. It was speculated that she was the daughter was the daughter of Nasuh Bey, descendant of Ibrahim II Bey, who was ruler of Karaman before the Ottoman conquest, and the sister of Piri Ahmed Bey and Abdülkerim Bey, but harem records indicate her instead as a slave concubine of Christian origins. He was the younger full-brother of Sultanzade Sultan.

One source claims that he was circumcised in 1472, along with his half-brother Şehzade Abdullah and Şehzade Cem, son of his grandfather Mehmed II and Çiçek Hatun, which means he might have been born earlier than 1470. It was likely that he was circumcised in 1480, along with his half-brothers Şehzade Ahmed, Şehzade Alemşah, Şehzade Korkut, Şehzade Mahmud, Şehzade Selim and Şehzade Cem's son, Şehzade Oğuzhan.

== Governorships ==
According to Turkish tradition, all princes were expected to work as provincial governors as a part of their training. Şehinşah was sent firstly to Menteşe in 1480 after his circumcision and his mother Hüsnüşah accompanied him. He only remained the governor of Menteşe for one year and was transferred to Manisa in 1481. He sponsored his mother's charitable foundations of Hatuniye Mosque, school, soup kitchen and a bathhouse in Manisa.

After the death of his half-brother Abdullah in 1483, he became the governor of Konya. His last post was Karaman, when he was assigned in 1485, while during his service in Karaman, the prince fell into financial crisis and borrowed heavily from the imperial treasury. His tutors during his governorships were Hadım Yakup Pasha and Sinan Bey. In Karaman, after the death of Kasım Bey, from the Karamanids, Turgutoğlu Mahmud Bey caused unrest in Karaman, Şehinşah had sent an army under Karagöz Bey and Turgutoğlu was defeated in successive battles of 1485 and 1486.

The rebellions in Karaman during his tenure were innumerable. His son Mehmed and half-brother Ahmed gathered their army and marched to defeat the rebels. In 1500, Şehinşah was defeated by the rebels in another rebellion.

As one of the remaining sons of Bayezid, Şehinşah was also the contender for the throne although he was overshadowed by the heir apparent and his father's favourite Ahmed, the warrior prince Selim, the poet Korkut, he had remained sidelined in the succession struggle. During the Şahkulu rebellion, Şehinşah remained in the sidelines, his half-brothers Korkut and Ahmed were the main figures during this rebellion orchestrated by Şahkulu, who was allied with the Safavids, an empire established by Shah Ismail I, who aided Şahkulu. It is speculated that Şehinşah may have allied himself with Şahkulu and Shah Ismail against his half-brother Ahmed, Venetian reports suggested that Şehinşah was Shah Ismail's most trusted man in Karaman. This also led to historians believe that Şehzade Ahmed and Hadım Ali Pasha may have conspired against Şehinşah and may have had him poisoned.

In 1509, Ahmed planned to seize Konya, but Şehinşah raised an army to suppress any intervention by Ahmed's forces. Şahkulu rebellion ended with the death of Şahkulu being shot by an arrow. Korkut withdrew and Ahmed lost the support from the Janisseries, thus Selim emerged as the victor in the succession struggle, he deposed Bayezid on 24 April 1512, and became the Sultan himself.

== Personal life ==
Şehinşah's only known consort was Mükrime Hatun, a slave concubine, mother of his firstson. Şehinşah had six children, five sons named Mehmed Şah, Mahmud, Alaeddin, Mustafa and Orhan, and a daughter. Although it is evident that Mehmed Şah was his son, there are conflicting reports about the existence of the other four sons, Mahmud died in 1510 and was buried in Istanbul, and Alaeddin's name was mentioned in the records. Alderson mentions that he had two sons named Mehmed and Orhan, it was evident that Şehinşah had Mehmed and a daughter. Mükrime died in 1517, and was buried in the tomb built by Şehinşah alongside her son Mehmed. Mehmed married Şahnisa Sultan, the daughter of Şehinşah's half-brother Şehzade Abdullah.

== Death ==
Şehinşah died on 2 July 1511 in Konya at the age of forty-one. It is certain, however, that he died in disgrace and in a violent manner, as evidenced by his mother's letters to Bayezid II, where she pleaded his innocence and asked for his honour to be restored, as well as asking for a dignified burial for him, but there are several speculations about his death. Alderson claims that he was executed by the order of his father Bayezid, due to being a Safavid's spy, although it cannot be confirmed since Şehinşah did not rebel directly, moreover he wasn't part of the succession struggle since his leg was crippled. Fisher claims he died of suicide.

As his death occurred at the same day as that of Hadım Ali Pasha, it is widely believed that he was killed on the orders of Şehzade Ahmed and Hadım Ali Pasha. They claimed that Şehinşah had connections with Şahkulu and embraced the Qizilbash faith. Moreover, due the death of Hadım Ali Pasha, Ahmed lost his greatest support and on the pretence of receiving political support from Shah Ismail, Ahmed had Şehinşah killed.

Şehinşah's body was taken to Bursa and buried in the Muradiye Complex. His son Mehmed became the governor of Karaman and Konya following his death, he had sought refuge with his uncle Selim after he broke away from Ahmed. Selim had him executed on 16 December 1512 with his only survived half-brother, Alaeddin. Şehinşah's mother outlived him by two years, she lived in Bursa and took particular care to support the members of his son's court who had been left without work, and died in 1513 and was buried in her own mausoleum in Muradiye Complex.

== Issue ==
Şehinşah had five sons and a daughter:

- Şehzade Mehmed Şah (c. 1488 – executed on 16 December 1512 for Selim I's order, buried with her father) - with Mükrime Hatun. He married his cousin Şahnisa Sultan, daughter of Şehzade Abdullah.
- Şehzade Alaeddin (executed on 16 December 1512 for Selim I's order).
- Şehzade Mahmud (died 1510)
- Şehzade Mustafa
- Şehzade Orhan
- Fülane Sultan

== Sources ==
- Şafakcı, Hamit (2022). II. Bayezid'in oğlu Şehzade Şehinşah'in hayatı. DergiPark.
