= Ayşe Sultan (daughter of Bayezid II) =

Ottoman princess (c.1465–1515)

- Born: c. 1465; Amasya, Ottoman Empire
- Died: c. 1515 (aged 49–50); Constantinople, Ottoman Empire (now Istanbul, Turkey)
- Burial: Vefa, Istanbul
- Spouse: Güveyi Sinan Pasha (m. 1480; died 1504)
- Issue: Sultanzade Ahmed Bey; Sultanzade Mustafa Bey; Hanzade Ayşe Mihrihan Hanımsultan; Gevherşah Hanımsultan; Kamerşah Hanımsultan; Fatma Hanımsultan; Mihrihan Hanımsultan
- Dynasty: Ottoman
- Father: Bayezid II
- Mother: Nigar Hatun
- Religion: Sunni Islam

Ayşe Sultan (Ottoman Turkish: عائشه سلطان, c. 1465 – c. 1515) was an Ottoman princess, the daughter of Sultan Bayezid II and his concubine, Nigar Hatun.

== Marriage ==
Ayşe Sultan was born in Amasya in 1465, to Bayezid II, then Şehzade and governator of the region. Her mother was the concubine Nigar Hatun, and Ayşe was therefore the blood sister of Şehzade Korkut and Fatma Sultan.

Ayşe married Guveyi Sinan Pasha, probably when her father was still a prince and the governor of Amasya. During Bayezid's reign, he was appointed the beylerbeyi (governor) of Anatolia. Ayşe followed him during his career in Anatolia, Gelibolu, and Rumelia.

The two together had two sons and five daughters.

Ayşe Sultan had spent public money, while her husband, Sinan Pasha, was at war. In a letter written to her father, she complained of lack of money. However, she later had to justify herself in the eyes of her father.

After she was widowed in 1504, she returned to the capital, and her father, and later her half-brother Sultan Selim I, granted her an allowance.

== Charities ==
In her lifetime she built a mosque in Edirne, a mescid and a school in Gelibolu to which she bequeathed her property. Sinan, her husband, received from her father villages in nahiye Üsküdar as a mülk. Consequently Sinan donated them to the mosque and kervansaray he constructed. The pasha established also a waqf at a zaviye in Gelibolu to which he bequeathed mülk villages purchased from Ayşe.

== Issue ==
By her husband, Ayşe Sultan had two sons and five daughters:

- Sultanzade Ahmed Bey, governor of Vize, married in January 1506 to the daughter of Hasan Pasha, governor of Rumelia. He had a daughter, Gevherhan Hanim.
- Sultanzade Mustafa Bey.
- Hanzade Ayşe Mihrihan Hanımsultan, married in November 1503 to his cousin Sultanzade Dukakinzade Mehmed Ahmed Bey (son of Gevhermuluk Sultan), Sanjak Bey of Ankara. She had a daughter, Mihrimah Hanim.
- Gevherşah Hanımsultan. She first married Dukakinoğlu Ahmed Pasha, with whom she had a son, Dukanginzade Ibrahim Pasha, (d. 1582, who married his cousin Neslişah Hanımsultan, daughter of Gevhermülük Sultan) and a daughter, Fatma Hanim (who in 1518 married Iskender Bey, governor of Antalya). They divorced before 1511 and he married her cousin Hafize Sultan. In second marriage, she married Ibrahim Bey (son of Omer Bey and brother of her sister Mihrihan Hanımsultan's husband). They had a son, Iskender Bey, and a daughter, Hacı Rukiye Hanım. She died in Aleppo on 4 April 1552.
- Kamerşah Hanımsultan, married on 6 July 1506 to Ahmed Bey, son of Ali Bey (her sister Fatma Hanımsultan's husband), and the grandson of Mesih Pasha, a progeny of the Palaiologos dynasty. The union was made by her mother, who was then a widow.
- Fatma Hanımsultan, married on 28 June 1506 to Ali Bey, son of Mesih Pasha and father of her sister Kamerşah Hanımsultan's husband. She had a son, Ahmed Bey, who married his cousin, the daughter of Fatma Sultan.
- Mihrihan Hanımsultan, married in 1505 to Hasan Bey, son of Ömer Bey and brother of her sister Gevherşah Hanımsultan's second husband, governor of Filorine.

== Sources ==
- Sakaoğlu, Necdet (2008). Bu mülkün kadın sultanları: Vâlide sultanlar, hâtunlar, hasekiler, kadınefendiler, sultanefendiler. Oğlak Yayıncılık. ISBN 978-9-753-29623-6.
- Uluçay, Mustafa Çağatay (2011). Padişahların kadınları ve kızları. Ankara, Ötüken.
- Gök, Ilhan (2014). Atatürk Kitaplığı M.C. O.71 numaralı 909-933/1503-1527 tarihli İn'amat defteri (transkripsiyon-değerlendirme).
