= Nigar Hatun =

Concubine of Ottoman Sultan Bayezid II

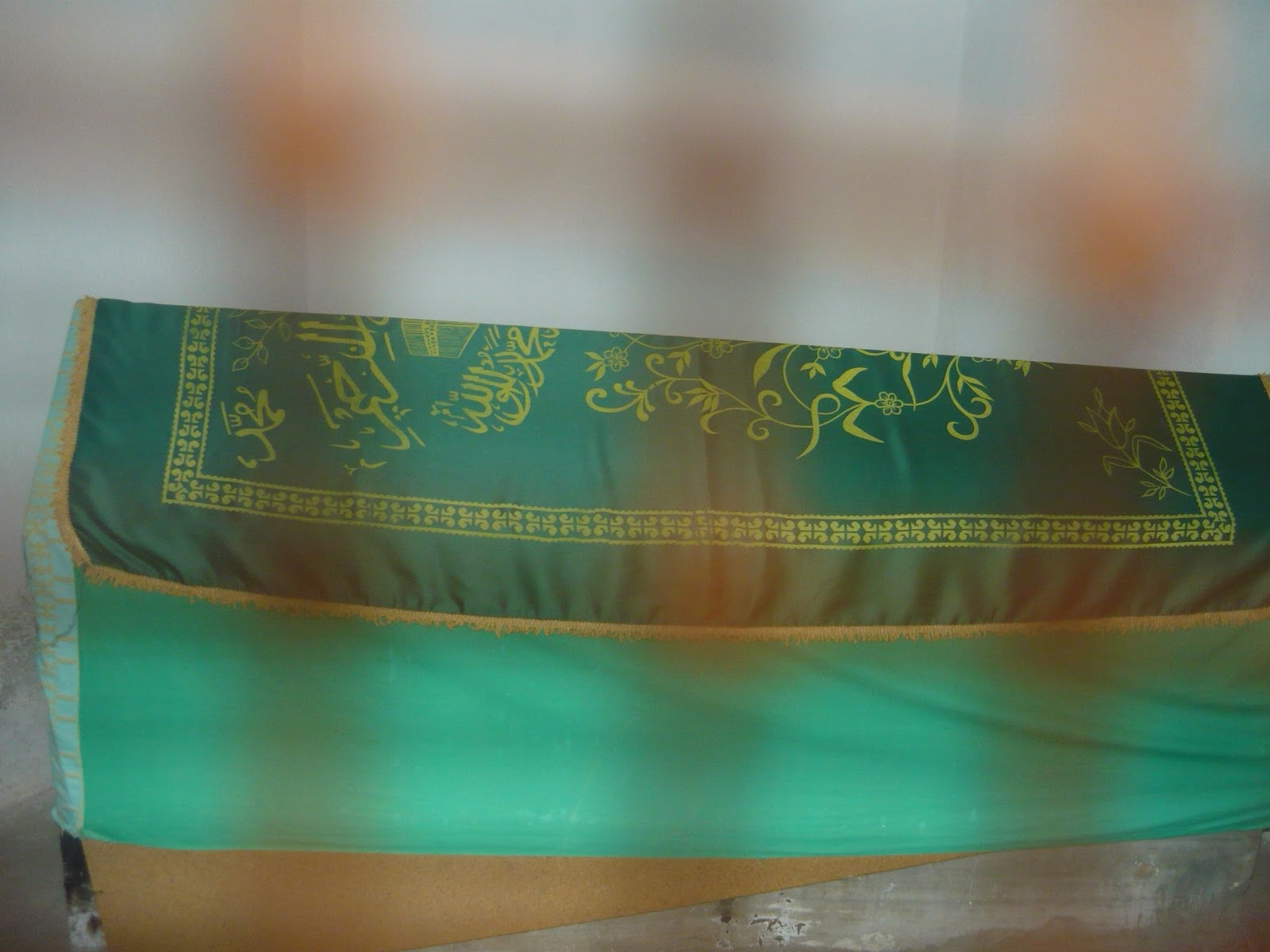
- The sarcophagus of Nigar Hatun inside the Yivliminare Mosque, Antalya
- Died: March 1503; Antalya, Ottoman Empire
- Burial: Yivliminare Mosque, Antalya
- Spouse: Bayezid II
- Issue: Ayşe Sultan; Sofu Fatma Sultan; Şehzade Korkut
- Father: Abdullah Vehbi
- Religion: Sunni Islam

Nigar Hatun (Ottoman Turkish: نکار خاتون; died March 1503) was a concubine of the Sultan Bayezid II of the Ottoman Empire.

== Life ==
She was the daughter of a man named Abdullah Vehbi. Nigar entered Bayezid's harem when Bayezid was still a prince, and the governor of Amasya. She gave birth to three children, two daughters, Ayşe Sultan and Fatma Sultan, and in 1469, a son, Şehzade Korkut. With Korkut's birth, she acquired a greater status within the royal household.

According to Turkish tradition, all princes were expected to work as provincial governors as a part of their training. Korkut was first appointed to Tire in 1483. The mother and son, along with his newly formed retinue were provisioned in Grand Vizier Ishak Pasha's palace. Nigar's daily stipend consisted of 50 akçe (silver coin). In late 1490s, she accompanied him to Manisa, and then to Antalya in 1502.

== Issue ==
From Bayezid II, Nigar had two daughters and a son:

- Ayşe Sultan (Amasya, 1465 – Constantinople, 1515). She had two sons and five daughters.
- Sofu Fatma Sultan (Amasya, 1468 – Bursa, after 1520). She married three times: before 1580 to Isfendiyaroğlu Mirza Mehmed Pasha, son of Kyzyl Ahmed Bey, with him she had a son, Sultanzade Mehmed Pasha (Governor of Balıkesir, he died in 1514 during the Chaldiran battle. He was married to his cousin Gevherhan Sultan, daughter of Selim I). The married ended with a divorce. Fatma remarried in 1489 to Mustafa Pasha, son of Koca Davud Pasha. She widowed in 1503. Fatma married for the third time in 1504 to Güzelce Hasan Bey. With him she had two sons, Sultanzade Haci Ahmed Bey and Sultanzade Mehmed Celebi (who married his cousin Ayşe Sultan, daughter of Şehzade Alemşah), and a daughter (who married her cousin Ahmed Bey, son Ali Bey and Fatma Hanımsultan, daughter of Ayşe Sultan (daughter of Bayezid II).
- Şehzade Korkut (Amasya, 1469 – Manisa, 10 March 1513). One of the main rivals of his half-brother Selim I for the throne was exiled and executed by him. He had two children who died as infants and two daughters.

== Death ==
Nigar Hatun died in March 1503, and was buried in her own mausoleum, which she had built in 1502, just a year before her death at Yivliminare Mosque, Antalya.

After her death, Korkut made an endowment in the memory of his mother in a small town named Istanos on the Teke Peninsula. In 1509–10, her daughter Fatma, also made an endowment at Eşrefoğlu Rûmî for the sake of her soul.

== Sources ==
- Al-Tikriti, Nabil Sirri (2004). Şehzade Korkud (ca. 1468-1513) and the Articulation of Early 16th Century Ottoman Religious Identity – Volume 1 and 2.
- Sakaoğlu, Necdet (2008). Bu mülkün kadın sultanları: Vâlide sultanlar, hâtunlar, hasekiler, kadınefendiler, sultanefendiler. Oğlak Yayıncılık. ISBN 978-9-753-29623-6.
- Uluçay, Mustafa Çağatay (2011). Padişahların kadınları ve kızları. Ankara: Ötüken. ISBN 978-9-754-37840-5.
