= Abdürrezzak Bahşı =

15th century scribe and poet

Şeyhzade Abdürrezzak Bahşı
- Copy made by Abdürrezzak Bahşı of a yarlıg issued in 800 AH (1398 CE) by Temür Qutlugh, Khan of the Golden Horde, in Khorezmian Turkic written in Old Uyghur and Arabic scripts.
- Occupation: Scribe
- Writing career
- Pen name: Bahşı, Bahşı Kul, Türkistânî Bahşı
- Language: Chagatai Turkic, Persian
- Notable work: Fetihname (Declaration of conquest)

Abdürrezzak Bahşı (fl. 15th century) was a scribe who wrote letters (bitig) and decrees (yarlıg) sent to the Eastern Turks in the second half of the 15th century using Arabic and Uyghur scripts in Eastern Turkic (Chagatai). He is not mentioned in any eastern (Chagatai) or western (Ottoman) Turkic sources, therefore his birth and death dates are unknown. He was of Turkic origin and had been brought to the Ottoman Empire from Samarkand, Turkistan by Mehmed II. He also served Bayezid II.

== Name ==
His name appears in the colophons of the works he copied and in the works he read as Abdürrezzak Şeyhzade Bahşı and Şeyhzade Abdürrezzak Bahşı, while in the first line of an Arabic-script couplet at the end of his Uyghur script tuyugas, he is referred to simply as Abdürrezzak. His signature is in the form of a seal arranged in Uyghur script, appearing in three places, and can only be read from top to bottom as şeyhzade çın belgüm ("şeyhzade, my true sign"), and from bottom to top as çın belgüm şeyhzade ("my true sign, şeyhzade"). One of these signatures also appears on page 190 of the Herat manuscript of Kutadgu Bilig in Uyghur script, with the Arabic inscription bahşı belgüsi below it. His pen names in his poems are Bahşı, Bahşı Kul, and Türkistânî Bahşı. Since he came to Anatolia from Samarkand, he sometimes also used the pen name Türkistânî Bahşı.

== Personality ==
Abdürrezzak Bahşı, who wrote in both Arabic and Uyghur scripts and knew Persian, sought attention and assistance from the Ottoman sultan of the time through various ghazals and qasidas. These requests sometimes included, in a nine-verse ghazal written in Arabic script, "that a crippled horse from the palace stables be given to him to be made into pastırma, because the people of Samarkand love horse meat"; in a fifteen-verse qasida written in both Uyghur and Arabic scripts, "that the sultan send him to Karaman in the summer"; as stated in a seventeen-verse qasida written in both Uyghur and Arabic scripts, "a house with a stable." His last request must have been granted, for in a seven-verse quatrain written in Arabic script, he is seen to have presented to the sultan in verse that "he was left without allowance because his seventeen horses and mules had eaten barley."

== Works ==
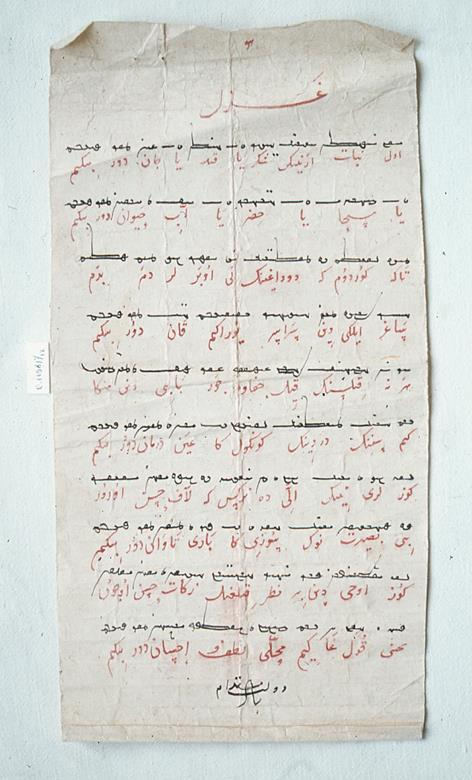
Mehmed II's Fetihname (Declaration of conquest) after the Battle of Otlukbeli

The texts that have survived from Abdürrezzak Bahşı to the present day are his own poems and the texts he copied. His own poems consist of twenty pieces. The twenty-one works he copied are, in Uyghur script at the top and Arabic script at the bottom, Edib Ahmed's Atebetü'l-hakāyık, Mîr Haydar Tilbe's Mahzenü'l-esrâr, ten ghazals by Lutfî, three ghazals by Sekkâkî, and in Arabic script, two ghazals each by Lutfî and Nevâî, and two tuyugas by Lutfî. To these texts, we can also add the Fatih Sultan Mehmed Yarlığı, which he transcribed in Uyghur script at the top and Arabic script at the bottom. Thus, forty-two pieces of Abdürrezzak Bahşı's texts, twenty-two of which are transcribed and twenty original works, have survived to this day in various volumes and genres. These texts are located in the Austrian National Library, the Süleymaniye Library, and the Topkapı Palace Museum Archive. Some of his qasidas and ghazals, as well as the Fatih Sultan Mehmed Yarlığı, are in the form of a "roll" in the Turkistan style. Works such as Atebetü'l-hakāyık and Mahzenü'l-esrâr have been prepared in book form. Of these texts, the Fatih Sultan Mehmed Yarlığı has been published in Turkish and French by Reşit Rahmeti Arat, and some of the Arabic and Uyghur script texts have been published in Turkish and English by Osman F. Sertkaya. Abdürrezzak Bahşı's life, works, transcriptions of all texts, translations into Turkish, and a dictionary, along with photographs of the texts, have been prepared for publication by Osman F. Sertkaya.

=== Example of his poetry ===
Bayezid II was praised in a ghazal of Abdürrezzak Bahşı:

1.

pâdişâhım devri-de bir hoş zamânım bar imiş.
barça havf u hem hatardın köp amânım bar imiş

I had a pleasant time in your reign my Padishah.
I was without fear of all fears and dangers.

2.

‘adl ü insâfıng çavı bardı hıtâ vü tâ hoten.
hamdüli’llâh kim şehim dek mihrübânım bar imiş.

The fame of your justice and fairness reached to China and Hotan.
Thanks to God that there exist a merciful person like my Padishah.

3.

çünki sultân bâyezîd han aldı rûmung tahtını.
uşbu devlet çün ezelden kendüsi-ge yâr imiş.

Sultan Bayezid Khan ascended the throne.
This country had been his fate since past eternity.

4.

her ‘adû kim münkir olsa sultânım devleti-ga.
bu mu‘ayyen kim ‘adûnıng boynı yip ü dâr imiş.

Any enemy that denied the country of my master.
That enemy's neck had been in rope and gallows.

5.

i‘tikâdlık kulları-nıñ yüzi bahşi dek küler.
i‘tikâdsız yörügen ornı cehennem nâr imiş.

Your believing servants' faces smile like Bahşı's.
The place of those who walk unbelieving is hellfire.
