= Has Murad Pasha =

Ottoman-Greek statesman and commander

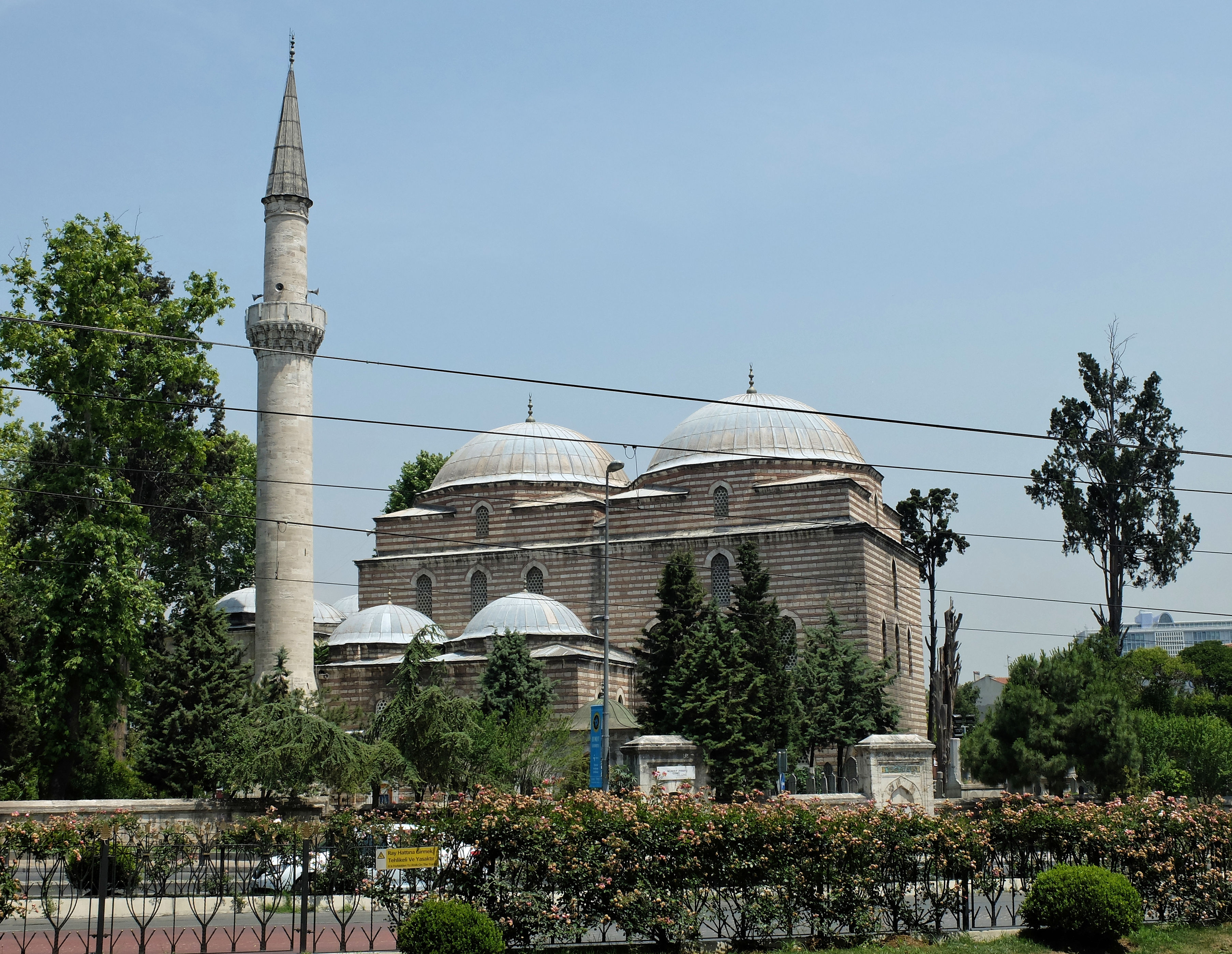
- Murat Paşa Mosque

Beylerbey of Rumelia
- In office 1468–1473

Personal details
- Born: c. 1440 Byzantine Empire
- Died: 4 August 1473 The Euphrates River area, near Tercan / Erzincan
- Relations: Mesih Pasha (brother); Constantine XI Palaiologos (uncle, uncertain)
- Family: Palaiologos dynasty
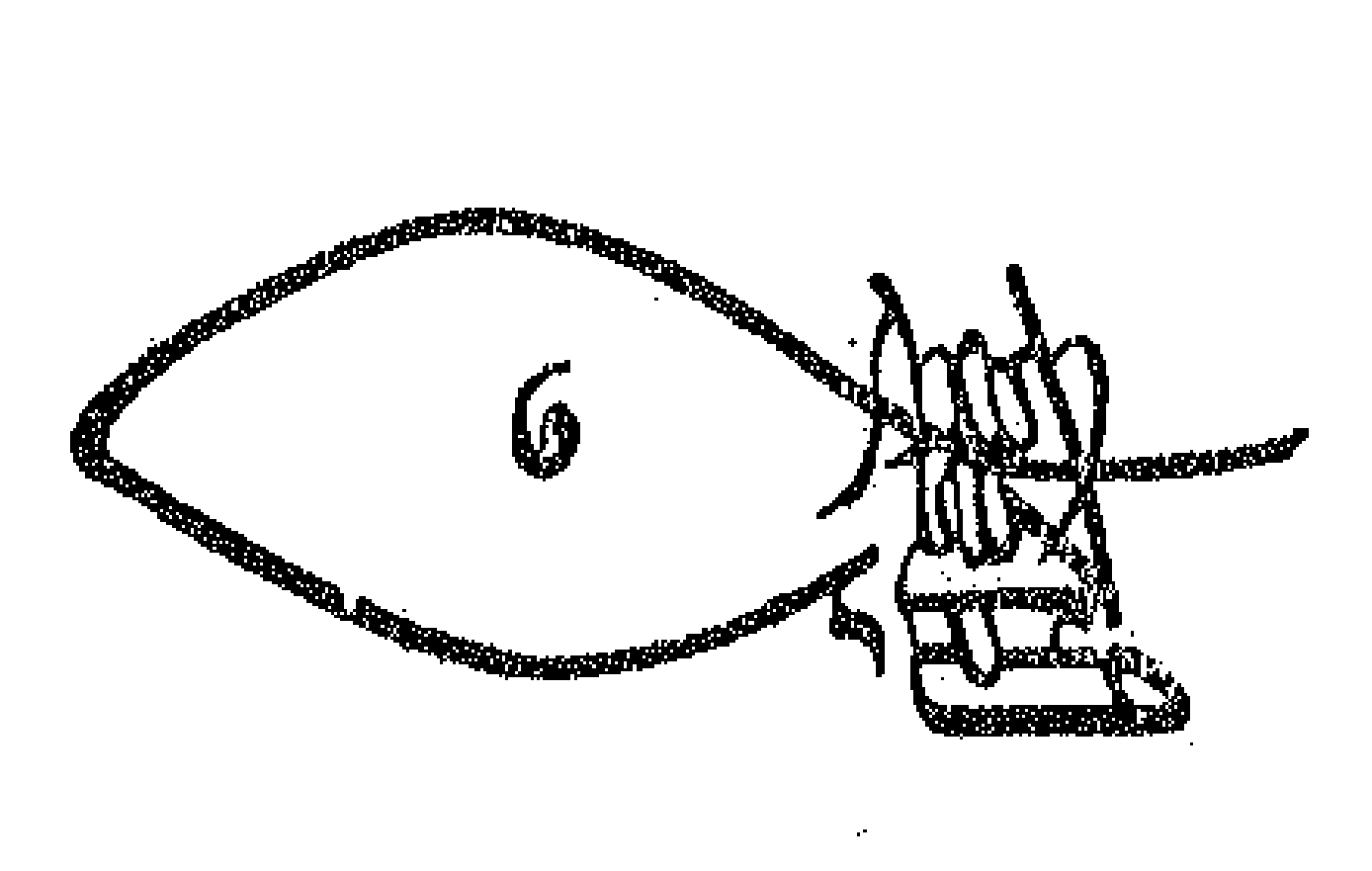
- Signature

Has Murad Pasha was an Ottoman statesman and commander of Byzantine Greek origin.

== Origin ==
According to the 16th-century Ecthesis Chronica, Has Murad and his brother, Mesih Pasha, were sons of a certain Gidos Palaiologos, identified by the contemporary Historia Turchesca as a brother of a Byzantine Emperor. This is commonly held to have been Constantine XI Palaiologos, the last Byzantine emperor, who fell during the fall of Constantinople to the Ottoman Sultan Mehmed II in 1453. If true, since Constantine XI died childless, and if the Ottomans had failed to conquer Constantinople, Mesih or Hass Murad might have succeeded him. The brothers were captured during the fall of Constantinople, converted to Islam, and raised as pages under the auspices of Sultan Mehmed II as part of the devşirme system. The exact identity of his father is unclear; Sphrantzes adds the name of "Thomas" to "Gidos", while several scholars, beginning with Martin Crusius, rather improbably equated the latter name to the Venetian "Guido", Latin "Vitus". However, neither Murad nor his brother can be identified with any of the known sons of Constantine XI's brothers who survived into adulthood—Thomas, Demetrios, and Theodore—leading Franz Babinger to suggest an illegitimate origin.

== Career and death ==
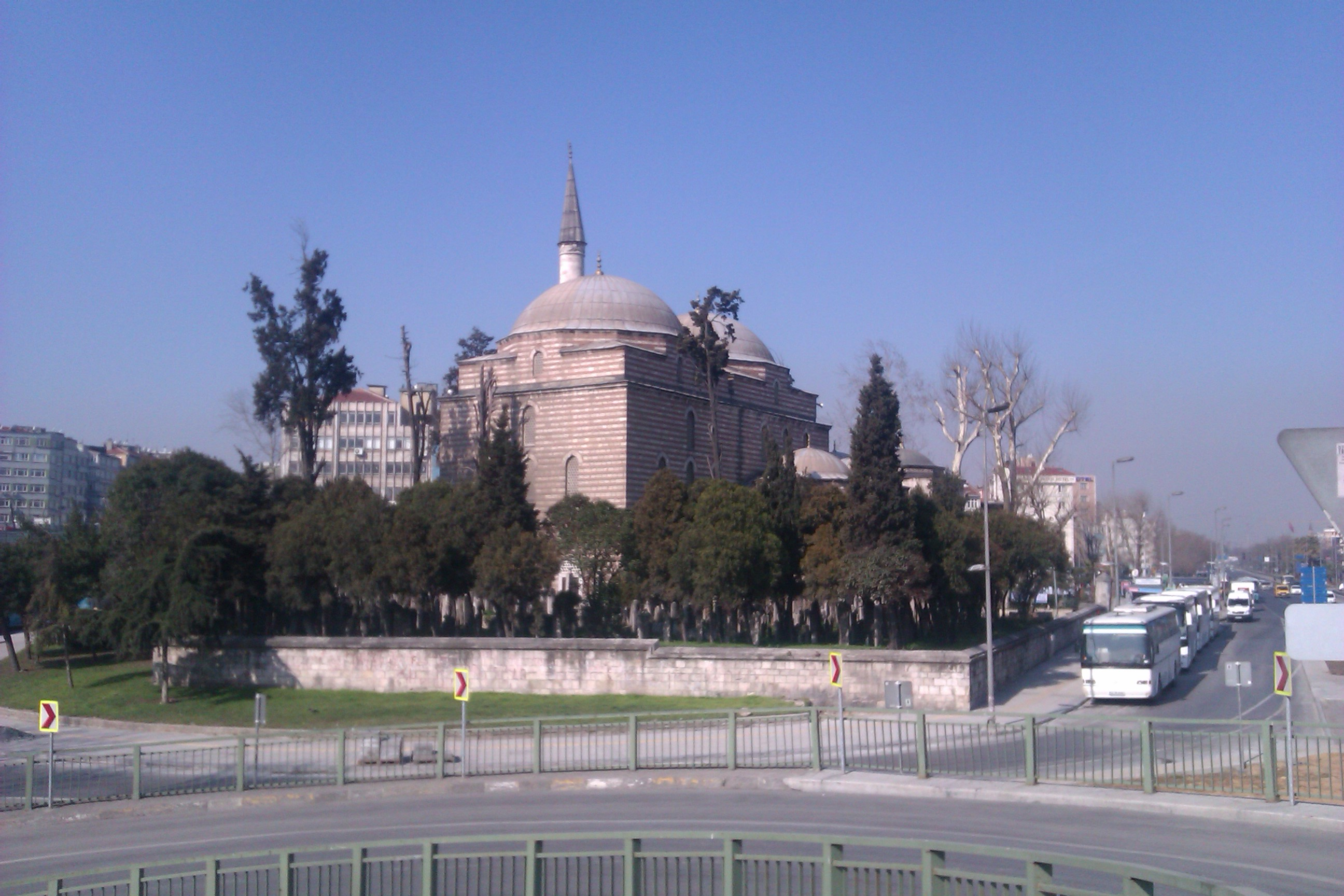
The Murat Pasha Mosque, begun by Hass Murad Pasha in 1465/66

In contrast to his brother, Murad's early life and career in Ottoman service are obscure. He must have enjoyed the favour of the Sultan—the sobriquet Hass, by which he is known, is an adjective meaning "private, personal" and designated intimacy and favour with a ruler—and wealthy, since in 1465/66 he began construction of a mosque in the Aksaray district of Constantinople, which was completed by his brother Mesih, who was eventually buried there.

When Mahmud Pasha Angelović was dismissed as Grand Vizier and beylerbey (governor-general) of the Rumelia Eyalet in c. 1468, Hass Murad succeeded him in the latter position. He seems to have held it until 1473, when he participated in a campaign against the Ak Koyunlu ruler Uzun Hassan in Anatolia, in which he was defeated and killed. During this campaign, he commanded the army's right wing, a force of 20,000 men with 40 sanjakbeys. Uzun Hassan retreated before the Ottomans beyond the Euphrates. According to some Ottoman historians, Mahmud Pasha, who served under Murad's command, tried to warn him that the Ak Koyunlu were known to employ feigned retreats and that he should follow them cautiously, but Murad, who is portrayed as young, impetuous, and eager to claim glory for himself, did not heed him. Instead he moved ahead with part of his army, crossed the Euphrates, and was caught in an ambush on 4 August. The ensuing Battle of Tercan was a disaster for the Ottomans: Murad was killed—although Uzun Hassan's letter to the Doge of Venice claims that he was captured—along with a large part of the Ottoman army, while several distinguished commanders, including Turahanoğlu Ömer Bey and Fenarioğlu Ahmed Pasha, were also taken prisoner. Other historians, however, including contemporary Greek and Latin sources, accuse Mahmud Pasha of knowing about the ambush and failing to warn Murad, because he was jealous of him.

== In popular culture ==
In the Turkish historical fiction TV series Mehmed: Fetihler Sultanı, Has Murad Pasha is currently portrayed by Turkish actor Hilmi Cem İntepe.

== Sources ==
- Babinger, Franz (1952). "Eine Verfügung des Paläologen Chass Murad-Pasa von Mitte Regeb 876 = Dez./Jan. 1471-72" (PDF). Documenta Islamica Inedita (in German). Berlin: Akademie-Verlag. pp. 197–210. Archived from the original (PDF) on 2016-03-28.
- Lowry, Heath W. (2003). The Nature of the Early Ottoman State. Albany, NY: State University of New York Press.
- Stavrides, Théoharis (2001). The Sultan of Vezirs: The Life and Times of the Ottoman Grand Vezir Mahmud Pasha Angelović (1453–1474). Brill. ISBN 978-90-04-12106-5.
- Trapp, Erich; Beyer, Hans-Veit; Walther, Rainer; Sturm-Schnabl, Katja; Kislinger, Ewald; Leontiadis, Ioannis; Kaplaneres, Sokrates (1976–1996). Prosopographisches Lexikon der Palaiologenzeit (in German). Vienna: Verlag der Österreichischen Akademie der Wissenschaften. ISBN 3-7001-3003-1.
