= Hüsnüşah Hatun =

Concubine of Ottoman Sultan Bayezid II

- Died: c. 1513; Bursa, Ottoman Empire
- Burial: Muradiye Complex, Bursa
- Spouse: Bayezid II
- Issue: Sultanzade Sultan; Şehzade Şehinşah
- Father: Nasuh Bey
- Religion: Sunni Islam

Hüsnüşah Hatun (Ottoman Turkish: حسنی شاہ خاتون; died c. 1513), also called Hüsnişah Hatun or Hüsnüşad Hatun, was a consort of Sultan Bayezid II of the Ottoman Empire.

== Family ==
According to the most widely accepted view, Hüsnüşah Hatun was the daughter of Nasuh Bey, a descendant of Ibrahim II Bey, the ruler of Karaman; however, historian Necdet Sakaoğlu suggests, based on harem records, that she may actually have been a concubine of Christian origin.

== In the harem ==
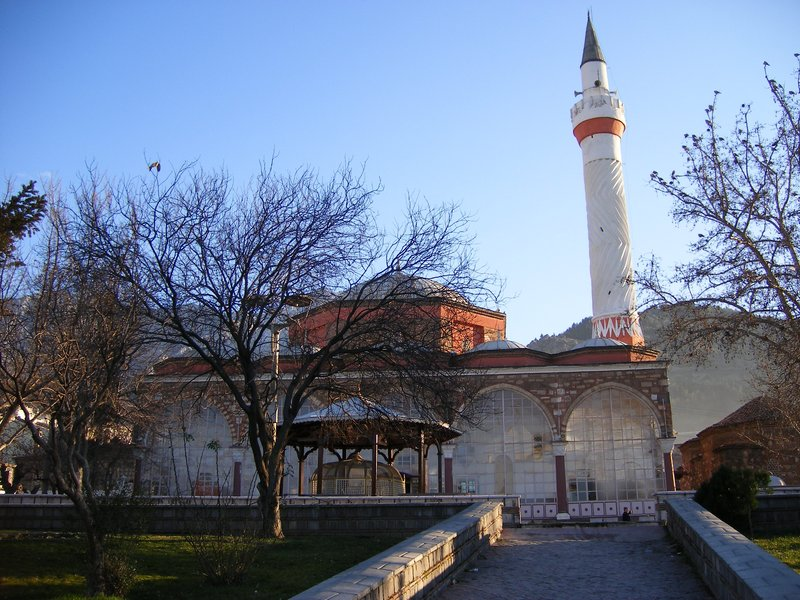
The exterior view of Hatuniye Mosque

Hüsnüşah entered Bayezid's harem when he was still a prince, and the governor of Amasya sanjak. She gave birth to two children, a daughter, Sultanzade Sultan, and a son, Şehzade Şehinşah in 1470.

According to Ottoman tradition, all princes were expected to work as provincial governors as a part of their training. Şehinşah was sent to Menteşe, Manisa, Konya, and then in 1485 to Karaman, and Hüsnüşah accompanied him. She built and endowed a mosque in 1490, and Kurşunlu Han in 1497 at Manisa. She also made several endowments in memory of her ancestors.

After Şehzade Şehinşah's execution in 1511, Hüsnüşah reported in a letter that she had been rendered crazy following his execution, defended his innocence, and requested that a mausoleum be built in his memory. She also corresponded with Selim I, Şehinşah's victorious brother, on behalf of Mevlana Pir Ahmed Çelebi, a scholar who had been at Şehinşah's court and who was neglected when the members of the prince's household were assigned new posts.

== Issue ==
From Bayezid II, Hüsnüşah Hatun had a daughter and a son:

- Sultanzade Sultan (Amasya, before 1470 -?)
- Şehzade Şehinşah (Amasya, 1470 - Karaman, 2 July 1511, buried in his half-brother Şehzade Ahmed's mausoleum). He had a known consort, Mükrime Hatun (buried in her own mausoleum in Muradiye Complex, Bursa), five sons and a daughter.

== Death ==
Hüsnüşah Hatun died at Bursa in 1513, and was buried in Muradiye Complex.

== Sources ==
- Al-Tikriti, Nabil Sirri (2004). Şehzade Korkud (ca. 1468-1513) and the Articulation of Early 16th Century Ottoman Religious Identity – Volume 1 and 2.
- Peirce, Leslie P. (1993). The Imperial Harem: Women and Sovereignty in the Ottoman Empire. Oxford University Press. ISBN 978-0-195-08677-5.
- Sakaoğlu, Necdet (2008). Bu mülkün kadın sultanları: Vâlide sultanlar, hâtunlar, hasekiler, kadınefendiler, sultanefendiler. Oğlak Yayıncılık. ISBN 978-9-753-29623-6.
- Uluçay, Mustafa Çağatay (2011). Padişahların kadınları ve kızları. Ankara: Ötüken. ISBN 978-9-754-37840-5.
