= Gevherimüluk Sultan =

Ottoman princess (c.1467–1550)

- Born: c. 1467; Amasya, Ottoman Empire
- Died: 20 January 1550 (aged 82–83); Constantinople, Ottoman Empire
- Spouse: Dukakinzade Mehmed Pasha
- Issue: Sultanzade Ahmed Bey; Neslişah Hanımsultan
- Father: Bayezid II
- Religion: Sunni Islam

Gevherimüluk Sultan (Ottoman Turkish: کوھر ملوک سلطان; c. 1467 – 20 January 1550) was an Ottoman princess, the daughter of Sultan Bayezid II (r. 1481–1512), and half sister to Selim I (r. 1512–1520).

== Biography ==
Anthony Dolphin Alderson notes, referring to Ulucay, that Şehzade Mahmud and Gevherimüluk Sultan were full brother and sister.

She married Dukakinzade Mehmed Pasha, son of Grand Vizier Dukakinzade Ahmed Pasha, governor of Smederevo, Kyustendil, Karaman and finally Aleppo. He died in 1557. Their son was Sultanzade Dukakinzade Mehmed Ahmed Bey (died 1537) and their daughter was Neslişah Hanımsultan (1507–1579), who had built her own mosque in 1522 named after her. Ahmed Bey was known as a Divan poet who in 1503 married Hanzade Ayşe Mihrihan Hanımsultan, daughter of his aunt Ayşe Sultan, and had a daughter, Mihrimah Hanım. Neslişah Hanımsultan married her half-uncle Dukaginzade Ibrahim Bey (died 1582).

== Death ==
Gevherimüluk Sultan was one of the longest-lived sultanas. She died on 20 January 1550 in Istanbul. Her son-in-law built a school near Zal Mahmud Pasha's Mosque and the three of them are buried there.

== Sources ==
- Süreyya Mehmed Bey (1996). Nuri Akbayar (ed.). Sicill-i Osmani. Vol. 1. Istanbul: Tarih Vakfi Yurt Yayınlar. ISBN 975-333-039-1.
