= Eşrefoğlu Rûmî =

Turkish poet

Eşrefoğlu Abdullah Rûmî
- Died: 1469
- Writing career
- Genres: Poetry

Eşrefoğlu Abdullah Rûmî (d. 1469) was a Turkish poet and mystic of the early years of Ottoman Empire. His original name was Abdullah, but he was known as Ashrafoglu Rumi, Ashrafoglu meaning “son of Ashraf” and Rumi referring to being from Rūm (lands of the Romans). He was born in Iznik (Nicea), and died there in 1469. His father Sayyid Ahmed came from Egypt and settled in İznik. After a theological education, Rumi turned to tasawwuf (Sufism) under the guidance of Haji Bayram Veli. Later, he founded the Eshrefiye branch of the Kadiri order of dervishes.

== Works ==
Rumi wrote in Turkish. While he is known for his Divan and Muzakki-l-nufus, he wrote many books such as:

- Tarîkatnâme,
- Fütüvvetnâme,
- Delâil ün nübüvve,
- İbretnâme,
- Mâziretnâme,
- Hayretnâme,
- Elestnâme,
- Nasîhatnâme,
- Esrarüttâlibîn,
- Münâcaatnâme and
- Tâcnâme.

== Poetry ==
Hickman provides a succinct summary of the characteristics of Eşrefoğlu's poetry and the reasons for its enduring popularity:

Eşrefoğlu's poetry is alternately confessional and exhortative, exuberant and sober. One minute the poet struggles with his disobedient self; the next he complains about the pain of separation from God. But over and over again he celebrates love, sometimes extravagantly. Such feelings and expressions are found, of course, in the verses of many other tekke poets, but Eşrefoğlu's seem to have gained special favor among generations of readers, perhaps because his tone is sincere and his language direct. Writing about his poetry, Turkish literary historians and critics often use the word sade ("simple, unadorned"). In that simplicity, Eşrefoğlu's verses are diametrically opposite, for the most part, those of the high classical tradition with their complex figures of speech and multiple nuanced meanings. Eşrefoğlu's poetry is generally accessible to the reader, even today. While he is often said to have been a follower (or imitator) of Yunus Emre, or to have composed his poetry in the "manner of Yunus," his style rarely reaches the limpid, lyrical quality of his fourteenth-century predecessor.

An example of his style is the poem that begins Yüregüme şerḥa şerḥa - this poem epitomizes Esrefoglu's thought, and as much as any one poem can, it can give some idea of his preoccupations.

Yüregüme şerḥa şerḥa yâreler urdı bu ʿişḳ
Ġâret ẹtdi göñlüm ilin yaġmaya urdi bu ʿişḳ
Şimdi ḥâkim göñlümüñ iklîmine ʿişḳdur benüm
'Akla nefse tene câna ḥükmini sürdi bu ʿişḳ
Her ṣıfat kim nefsüñ u 'aklüñ u rûḥuñ var idi
Ṭartdı seyfullâh yürütdi ḳamusin ḳırdı bu ʿişḳ
Bu göñül ḥücrelerini taḫlîye ḳıldı ḳamu
Âdemîyet noḳṭasından sildi süpürdi bu ʿişḳ
Kendü varlıġiyla küllî varlıġım maḥv eyledi
Dôst göziyle baḳdı ol dôst yüzini gördi bu ʿişḳ
Çün fenâ dârında benlik Manṣur'ın dâr eyledi
Dôst eşikinde anâ l-ḥaḳḳ nevbetin urdı bu ʿişḳ
Gün gün Eşrefoġlı Rûmî derdüñ artar pes neden
Zaḫmuna hôd dôst elinden merhem ẹrgürdi bu ʿişḳ

This love has left my heart in tatters.
This love has sacked my heart’s domain, left it ravaged.
It is love that rules all the reaches of my heart.
This love has spread its rule over intellect and ego, over body and soul.
Whatever attributes intellect, ego and spirit had,
This love brandished the sword of God and vanquished them all.
Emptying out all the chambers of my heart;
This love swept away every trace of human quality.
Destroying my human existence, replacing it with its own.
This love saw the face of the Friend with the eye of the Friend.
Since it executed ego’s Mansur on the gallows of this transient world,
This love has struck the drum of “I am the Truth” on the threshold of that Friend.
Eşrefoğlu Rumi! Why does your suffering increase daily when
This love, by the hand of that Friend, extends a salve to your wounds?
