= Şehzade Korkut =

Ottoman prince, son of Sultan Bayezid II

- Born: c. 1469; Amasya, Ottoman Empire
- Died: 13 March 1513 (aged 43–44); Emet, Ottoman Empire
- Burial: Orhangazi, Bursa
- Issue: Two sons Fatma Sultan; Ferahşad Sultan
Names
- Korkut bin Bayezid Han
- House: House of Osman
- Father: Bayezid II
- Mother: Nigar Hatun
- Religion: Sunni Islam

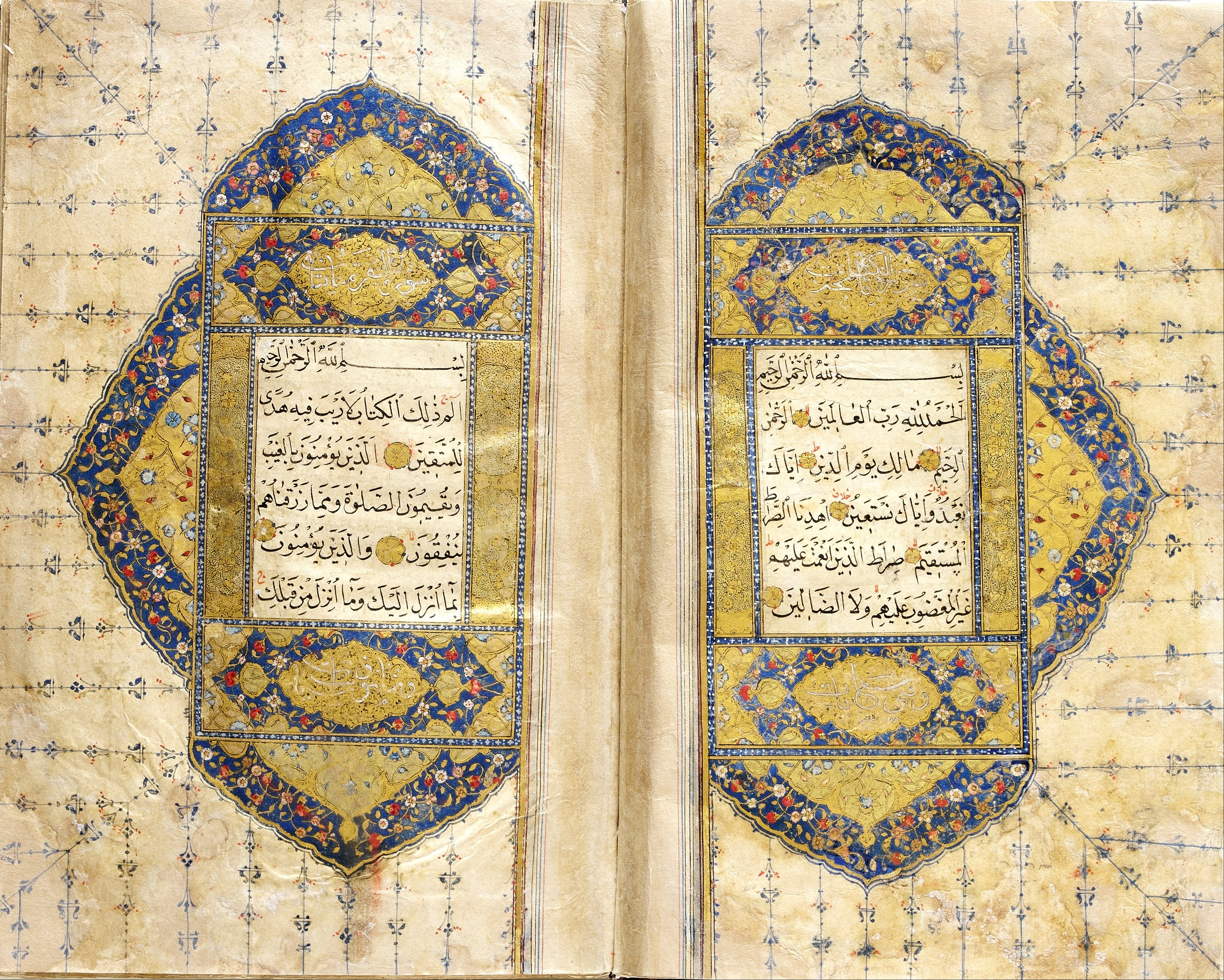
Qur'an copied by Şehzade Korkut in Sakıp Sabancı Museum. This manuscript is the only known example of his calligraphy and a proof, that if "Had Prince Korkut lived longer, he would undoubtedly have become one of Sheikh Hamdullah noted followers".

Şehzade Korkut (Ottoman Turkish: شاهزاده کورکوت; c. 1469 – 13 March 1513) was an Ottoman prince who was for a short time the regent for the Ottoman throne. He was the son of the Ottoman Sultan Bayezid II.

== Early life ==
Although it is stated that he was born in Amasya in 1469, there is no clear record about the year of birth in the sources. He was the son of Bayezid II and Nigar Hatun. Şehzade Korkut was named by his grandfather, Sultan Mehmed II. His name was possibly inspired by Dede Korkut, the legendary sage of Turkic oral tradition who was renowned for his wisdom and his role in preserving the cultural heritage of the Oghuz Turks. In one of his works, he writes his name as Ebülhayr Mehmed Korkut. In official documents, he used only the name Korkut. In 1479, his grandfather Mehmed II sent Korkut to Istanbul with his other brothers to be circumcised. After the death of his grandfather, he was a short term regent before his father arrived at the capital. He was "the most beloved grandchild" of Sultan Mehmed, "who saw to it that Prince Korkut received the most rigorous education in his palace". He wrote six highly regarded works on religious subjects and a collection of poems, and also composed musical works.

== As a governor ==
According to Ottoman tradition, all princes (Turkish: şehzade) were required to work as provincial (sanjak) governors (sanjak-bey) as a part of their training. In 1491, Korkut was appointed as the governor of Saruhan sanjak (Manisa in modern Turkey). In 1502, he was appointed as the governor of Teke (Antalya in modern Turkey), a port on the Mediterranean coast. Antalya was much farther from Istanbul than Manisa, and Korkut interpreted this appointment as a sign of disfavor by his father, the sultan. He asked for his former seat; upon refusal in 1509, he escaped to Mamluk Egypt under the pretext of pilgrimage. Egypt was under Mamluk rule, and he was welcomed by the Mamluk sultans. His father considered this a sign of negligence on Korkut's part, but pardoned him, and Korkut returned to Ottoman lands. During his voyage back home, the Knights Hospitaller based in Cyprus attacked his ship and attempted to capture him, but Korkut managed to escape from the knights and return home safely.

== Beginning of the interregnum ==
Beyazıt was now old and ailing. Korkut decided to move to Manisa to be closer to the capital. During this travel, a part of his treasury was raided by the rebels of Şahkulu. Later, he secretly traveled to Istanbul to have a role in the coming interregnum between his brothers. However, he found almost no supporters in the capital. He met with his brother Selim, who convinced him to return to his sanjak. Korkut then gave up all of his claims to the throne and took no part in the civil war between his two brothers (Şehzade Ahmet and Selim I).

== Death ==
Selim I (known as Yavuz) became the new sultan in 1512. Korkut readily accepted his brother's reign. Nevertheless, distrustful Selim decided to test his loyalty by sending him fake letters from various bureaucrats of the empire that attempted to encourage him to take part in a rebellion against Selim. Feeling that Korkut was preparing to revolt, Selim had Korkut executed in 1513 near Emet (around Kütahya in Turkey). He was buried in Bursa, in the türbe of Sultan Orhan.

== Issue ==
The names of Şehzade Korkut's concubines are not known, but he must have had at least two, since he had two sons (at the time there was a rule that stated that a concubine could only have one son before being estranged from a prince or Sultan's bed).

=== Sons ===
Şehzade Korkut had two sons, both of whom died infants. Their names and dates of birth and death are unknown.

=== Daughters ===
Şehzade Korkut had at least two daughters:

- Fatma Sultan (?–?). She married Ali Bey.
- Ferahşad Sultan (?–?). She first married Malkoçoğlu Ali Bey and then in second marriage Mehmed Bey Efendi.
