= Bayezid II =

Sultan of the Ottoman Empire from 1481 to 1512

- Basileus and autokrator
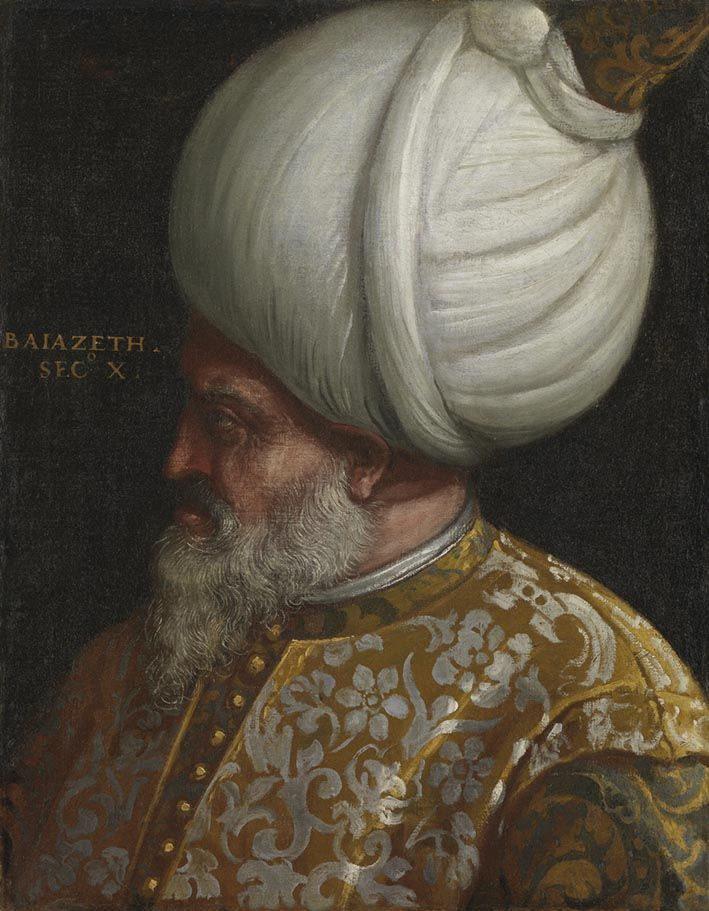
- Bayezid II by Paolo Veronese, c. 16th century

Sultan of the Ottoman Empire (Padishah)
- Reign: 22 May 1481 – 24 April 1512
- Predecessor: Mehmed II
- Successor: Selim I
- Born: 3 December 1447 or 1448; Dimetoka, Ottoman Empire
- Died: 26 May 1512 (aged 64); Abalar, Havsa, Ottoman Empire
- Burial: Bayezid II Mosque, Istanbul, Turkey
- Consorts: Şirin Hatun; Hüsnüşah Hatun; Bülbül Hatun; Nigar Hatun; Gülruh Hatun; Ayşe Gülbahar Hatun; Muhtereme Ferahşad Hatun; Others
- Issue Among others: Aynışah Sultan; Şehzade Abdullah; Ayşe Sultan; Şehzade Ahmed; Gevherimüluk Sultan; Şehzade Korkut; Şehzade Şehinşah; Selim I
Names
- Bayezid bin Mehmed
- Dynasty: Ottoman
- Father: Mehmed II
- Mother: Gülbahar Hatun
- Religion: Sunni Islam
- Tughra
- Military career
- Conflicts: See list: Battle of Otlukbeli; Battle of Yenişehir (1481); Captured of Duchy of Saint Sava; Moldavian Campaign (1484–1486); Siege of Chilia; Polish–Ottoman War (1485–1503); Ottoman–Mamluk War (1485–1491); Battle of Tekirdag; Ottoman-Hungarian War (1492-1495); Siege of Modon (1500); Siege of Lepanto (1499)

Bayezid II (Note: Ottoman Turkish: بايزيد ثانى, romanized: Bāyezīd-i s̱ānī; Turkish: II. Bayezid) (3 December 1447/1448 – 26 May 1512) was the sultan of the Ottoman Empire from 1481 to 1512. During his reign, Bayezid consolidated the Ottoman Empire, thwarted a pro-Safavid rebellion and finally abdicated his throne to his son, Selim I. Bayezid evacuated Sephardi Jews from Spain following the fall of the Nasrid Kingdom of Granada and the proclamation of the Alhambra Decree and resettled them throughout Ottoman lands, especially in Salonica.

== Early life ==
Bayezid was born in Demotika on 3 December 1447/1448 as the first son of Şehzade Mehmed (future Mehmed II) and his concubine Gülbahar Hatun. In 1451, his grandfather Murad II died and his father ascended the throne again.

== Sanjak Bey of Amasya (1454–1481) ==
Around 1454–1456, he was appointed governor of Amasya, accompanied by his mother. Bayezid was educated in Amasya and served there as governor for 27 years, until he became the eighth sultan of the Ottoman Empire in 1481.

According to documents in the Topkapı Palace Archives, Bayezid's tutor and treasurer informed Mehmed II that some of the prince's companions had introduced him to opium and hashish. Upon learning of this, Mehmed II severely reprimanded his son. Bayezid subsequently asked for his father's forgiveness, claiming that he had been using opium to lose weight.

In 1473, he fought in the Battle of Otlukbeli against the Aq Qoyunlu.

== Fight for the throne ==
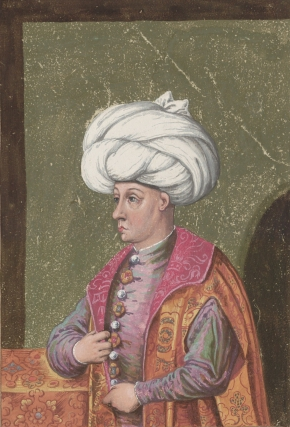
Bayezid II's younger brother Cem

Bayezid II's overriding concern was the quarrel with his brother Cem Sultan, who claimed the throne and sought military backing from the Mamluks in Egypt. Karamani Mehmed Pasha, last grand vizier of Mehmed II, informed him of the death of the Sultan and invited Bayezid to ascend the throne. Having been defeated by his brother's armies, Cem sought protection from the Knights of St. John in Rhodes. Eventually, the Knights handed Cem over to Pope Innocent VIII (1484–1492). The Pope thought of using Cem as a tool to drive the Turks out of Europe, but as the papal crusade failed to come to fruition, Cem died in Naples.

== Reign ==
Bayezid II ascended the Ottoman throne in 1481. Like his father, Bayezid II was a patron of western and eastern culture. Unlike many other sultans, he worked hard to ensure a smooth running of domestic politics, which earned him the epithet of "the Just". Throughout his reign, Bayezid II engaged in numerous campaigns to conquer the Venetian possessions in Morea, accurately defining this region as the key to future Ottoman naval power in the Eastern Mediterranean. In 1497, he went to war with Poland and decisively defeated the 80,000 strong Polish army during the Moldavian campaign. The last of these wars ended in 1501 with Bayezid II in control of the whole Peloponnese. Rebellions in the east, such as that of the Qizilbash, plagued much of Bayezid II's reign and were often backed by the shah of Iran, Ismail I, who was eager to promote Shi'ism to undermine the authority of the Ottoman state. Ottoman authority in Anatolia was indeed seriously threatened during this period and at one point Bayezid II's vizier, Hadım Ali Pasha, was killed in battle against the Şahkulu rebellion. Hadım Ali Pasha's death prompted a power vacuum.

=== Moldavian Campaign ===
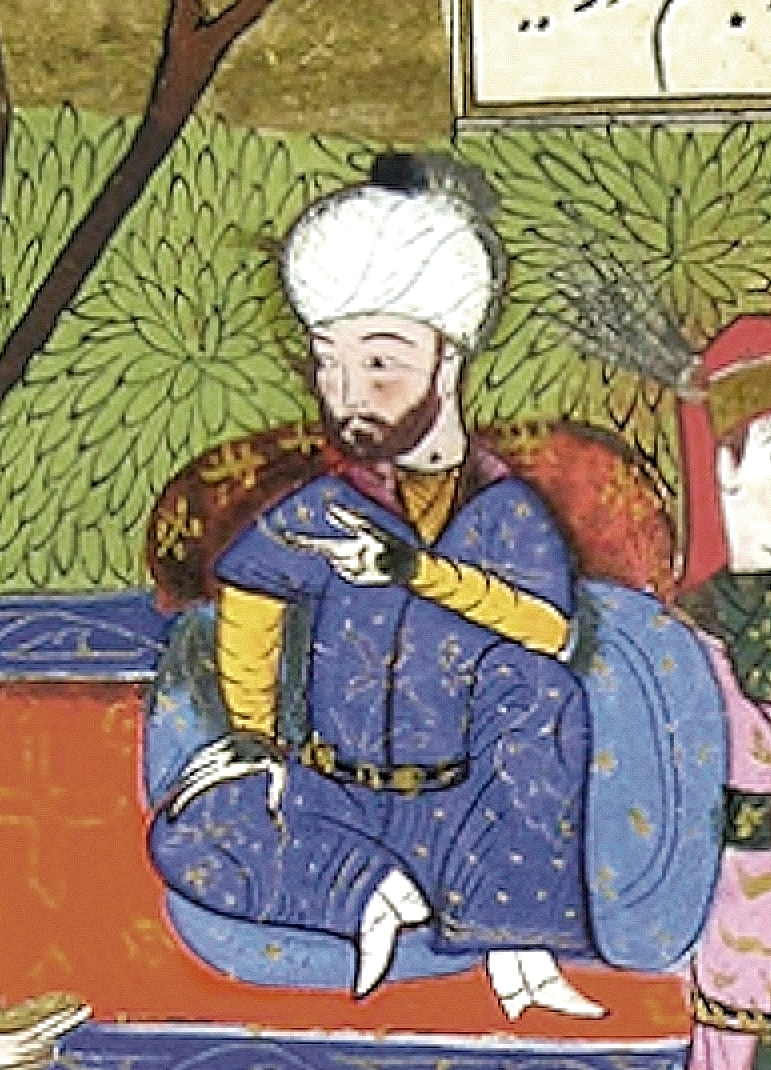
Contemporary depiction of Bayezid II and his court, Shāhnāma-i Malik-i Āhī, calligrapher and painter Darwish Mahmud b. Abdullah nakkash, Istanbul, ca. 1495, TSMK, H. 1123, fol. 14a.

Bayezid II's strategy toward the Principality of Moldavia combined military pressure with the preservation of a tributary relationship and Moldavia would remain independent in internal affairs. Moldavia had paid tribute to the Porte since the mid-1450s. The tribute was suspended by Stephen the Great from the early 1470s, but resumed the payments in 1479, in the reign of Mehmed II. The Black Sea ports of Kilia (Chila) and Akkerman (Cetetea Albă), remained in Moldovian rule, Stephen had taken Kilia in 1465 and rebuilt its stone fortress in 1479, and these were a persistent Ottoman objective.

In 1484 Bayezid II personally led a campaign against these ports, supported by Wallachian troops under the Ottoman vassal Vlad the Monk and Crimean Tatar forces under Menli I Giray. Ottoman forces attacked Kilia by land and river, and after a siege of about ten days the city surrendered on about 14 July 1484. Akkerman, captured by Tatar forces fell in early August. Part of Akkerman's population was deported to Istanbul and western Anatolia. Its churches were converted into mosques. Writing to the merchants of Ragusa on 2 August 1484, Bayezid described Kilia as the key to Moldavia, Hungary and the Danubian lands. The campaign was prominently featured in Ottoman chronicles, for example in the "Tarih-i Sultan Bayezid" includes manuscript in the Topkapı Palace miniatures of fortresses made shortly after their capture. With the two ports in Ottoman control, the Black Sea practically became an "Ottoman Lake."

The loss of these cities was a severe blow to Moldavia both economic and military. Stephen turned to Poland and paid homage to King Casimir IV at Kolomyia (Colomea) in September 1485. While he was in Poland, the Ottomans invaded Moldavia and burned Suceava on 19 September. A force of combined Moldavian–Polish troops forced the Ottomans to retreat, notably at the Battle of Cătlăbuga in November 1485, and a further clash took place at Şcheia in March 1486. Nevertheless these efforts were not entirely successful, and the Ottomans responded. Mihaloğlu Ali Bey, İskender Bey and Malkoçoğlu Bali Bey continued to raid Moldavia in 1485–86. A peace treaty in 1486 confirmed Ottoman control of Kilia and Akkerman and restored Moldavia's status as a tribute-payer under the sultan's protection.

In 1489 Poland concluded a truce with Bayezid II and tacitly accepted the Ottoman hold on the two ports. Since there was no longer any hope of recovering them, Stephen made his own deal with the sultan and resumed paying tribute. After that, he supported and joined with the Ottomans against Poland. For example during Ottoman raid of 1498 under Bali Bey, Stephen supplied the army and was rewarded by the sultan with a robe of honour and banners. Bayezid himself was busy with the war with the Egyptian Mamluks and, from 1499 with Venice, He relied on frontier raiders and the Crimean Khanate to keep Ottoman influence. Ottoman operations north of the Danube started again when Poland attacked Moldavia in 1497–1499.

=== Mamluk War (1485–1491) ===
The first Ottoman-Mamluk war was fought during Bayezid II's reign against the Egyptian sultan Qaitbay. The two powers competed for influence over the southern Anatolian frontier. The Egyptian Mamluks kept client states such as Dulkadir and Karaman as buffers and to guard the mountain passes; both had been targets of Ottoman expansion since the 1470s. Tensions increased because of Bayezid's brother Cem Sultan, who took refuge in Cairo after their father died in the succession struggle of 1481–1482. The Mamluks refused to give him military support, but letting him stay made Bayezid angry. Things got worse when the Egyptian officials detained an Ottoman envoy returning from the Deccan.

Bayezid started the war in 1484 by sending an army into Dulkadir. In 1485, the Dulkadir ruler Alaüddevle Bozkurt, with Ottoman support, attacked the Mamluk-held city of Malatya. The Ottomans quickly occupied Tarsus, Adana and other Cilician fortresses, attacked by land and sea. Karagöz Mehmed Pasha, the new governor of Karaman, led provincial troops that defeated the Turgudlu and Varsak tribes and captured many fortresses in Cilica.

A Mamluk army under Azbak (Uzbek) min Tutukh marched north in October 1485. On 9 February 1486 it attacked a poorly prepared Ottoman force near Adana and scattered it, then besieged the city. An Ottoman relief army was crushed in the second Battle of Adana on 15 March. Bayezid's son-in-law Hersekzade Ahmed Pasha was captured, and the Ottomans lost Cilicia to the Mamluks. However, the Mamluks were reluctant to continue fighting and returned to Cairo by 1486. In response, Bayezid sent a large force of Janissaries under Grand Vizier Koca Davud Pasha. Instead of looking for a decisive battle with the Mamluks, the campaign aimed to pacify Mamluk supporters in the region, thereby securing the Ottoman rear.

The decisive campaign came in 1488. An Ottoman army under Hadım Ali Pasha invaded Cilicia in the spring and quickly reoccupied the key cities, fortresses and passes. Turkish historian İdris-i Bidlisi presented the offensive as an effort to free Syria from Mamluk rule. A fleet, under the recently released Hersekzade Ahmed Pasha, was to support the army from the sea. But bad weather sank or drove away the Ottoman ships and oponed the coastal pas into Cilicia to the Mamluks. Qaitbay sent the largest army, Egypt had produced in a century, about 40,000 men, under Azbak. The armies fought at Ağaçayırı near Adana. The Ottomans at first made progress on one wing, but their other flank was driven back, and when troops of the Karaman province fled the battlefield the Ottomans were forced to retreat, leaving the Egyptian Mamluks with a costly victory. The Mamluks went on to take Adana after a three-month siege, most Ottoman provincial commanders were recalled to Constantinople and imprisioned. Several Turkmen allies of the Ottomans, including Alaüddevle, turned back toward the Mamluks.

Operations in 1489–1490 were limited. In 1490 a Mamluk force advanced into Karaman and besieged Kayseri, but withdrew to Cilicia when an Ottoman relief army under Hersekzade Ahmed Pasha approached. By then both sides wanted peace: Qaitbay was close to bankruptcy, while Bayezid feared renewed conflict in the Balkans and a possible crusade against the Ottomans. A treaty concluded in 1491 restored the status quo ante, with the border fixed at the Gülek Pass in the Taurus Mountains and the Cilician plain left to the Mamluks. The war ended without territorial change, and it has been described as a Mamluk victory that left the Mamluk Sultanate of Egypt exhausted and in need of peace perhaps even more than Bayezid.

=== Polish–Lithuanian War (1497–1500) ===
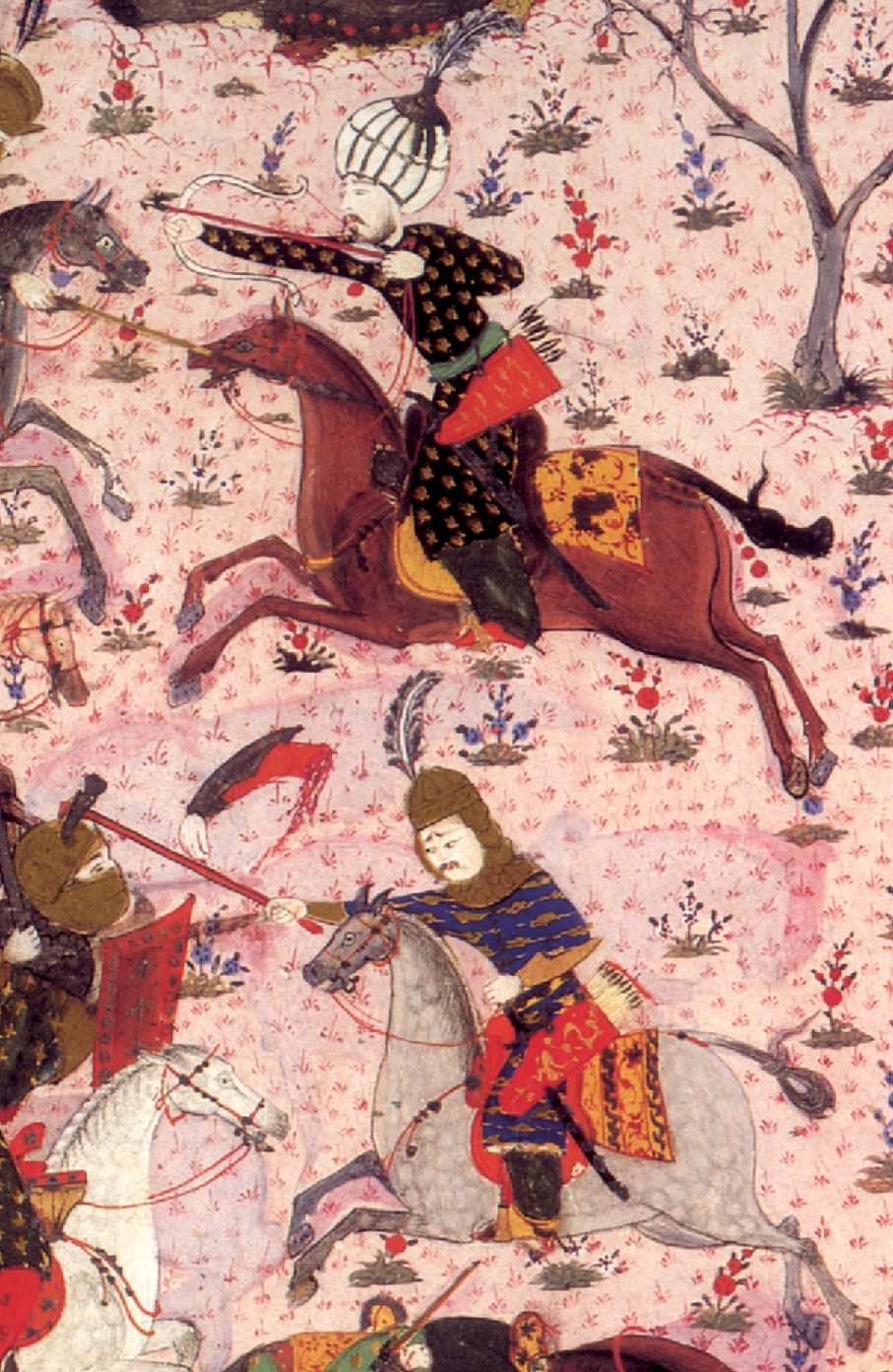
An akinji is depicted. Akinjis played a crucial role in raids directed against Poland.

Moldavia was the main battleground in a series of Polish-Ottoman wars between 1485 and 1503. The truce of 1489, which confirmed Ottoman control of Kilia and Akkerman, had already led Stephen the Great to abandon Poland and turn to the Ottoman government. After Casimir's death in 1494 his son John I Albert followed a more aggressive policy to restore Polish control over Moldavia and recover the Black Sea ports. Some sources say he also wanted to install his brother Sigismund as king of Moldavia. Stephen refused to join the anti-Ottoman league of Poland, Hungary and Venice, because he feared Moldavia would become the main theatre of Polish–Ottoman war. Instead, he asked for Ottoman support. Bayezid rejected a Polish envoy who came to Istanbul asking for peace.

Preparations led to a large expedition in the summer of 1497, with heavy artillery. Sources give very different numbers for the size of polish army (from about 40,000 to 80,000 with 200 cannon). Probably the total Polish strength was about 59,000. The Polish army entered Moldavia and began the siege of the capital, Suceava, on September. Stephen had received help from the Ottomans and their vassal the Crimean Tatars and the Wallachians. Stephen himself was a tributary of Ottomans; for the sultan, too, it meant war. Turkish chronichler İbn Kemal calls him one of the sultan's tribute-paying servants.

On 26 October 1497, during the Polish retreat, Moldavian forces and their allies attacked the column in the Cosmin Forest. John Albert took a different, unfamiliar road through Bukovina. As the baggage train entered the forest the Moldavians felled trees across the road and their infantry attacked both sides, throwing the column into disorder. The Polish army was badly defeated; estimates of the losses range from about to 11,000 up to 40,000 men. A force of Masovian knights sent to relieve the king was destroyed at Lentești.

The Polish defeat was followed in 1498 by retaliatory raids into Polish territory. In April 1498 an Ottoman akıncı army under Malkoçoğlu Bali Bey crossed Moldavia, where Stephen supplied it with provisions, and reached the Dniester on 28 April. It was joined by some 6,000 Tatars sent by Menli I Giray, and the Ottoman chronicles speak of tens of thousands of captives, around 50,000 according to İbn Kemal and Oruç Bey. Stephen was rewarded by Bayezid with a robe of honour and standards for his service. A separate Moldavian campaign devastated southern Poland as far as Lwow, with figures of up to 100,000 captives given in the literature. A second Ottoman raid at the end of 1498 ended in disaster, as most of the raiders froze to death on the return march in January 1499.

According to İbn Kemal, the Polish king, having failed to win Hungarian help and having been informed by Stephen, was forced to beg for mercy. Peace with Moldavia followed in 1499 and in October 1503 King Alexander I Jagiellon concluded a five-year peace treaty with Bayezid II. The Ottoman chronicles of these years treat Moldavia as an Ottoman territory whose ruler and population were tribute-payers of the sultan, and describe the raids on Poland as the defence of this tributary land.

=== Venetian War (1499–1503) ===
Bayezid II, Semailname

Venice had not fought with the Ottomans after the war of 1463–1479 and continued to keep the treaty of 1479. But after 1491 onwards, Bayezid made things worse with Venice. The Ottomans stopped selling grain exports to Venice, while Venetian peace offers came to nothing. During the Cem affair the Ottomans had come to realise that without a strong navy they could not feel safe in the Balkans not could influence events in Italy. After 1489 they tried to make their fleet stronger, and in 1497 they began building two huge sailing ships at the Istanbul shipyards. These göke carracks, each said to have carried over forty guns and a thousand fighting men, were built under the guidance of a renegade Venetian engineer.

War began in 1499 when the Ottomans arrested the Venetian subjects in their lands, which was basically a declaration of war. Bayezid went to war himself with the army, under the "beylerbeyi" of Rumeli Mustafa Pasha, marched on the Venetian port of Lepanto (İnebahtı), while the sultan followed and set up his camp nearby. The fleet, some 260 ships under the "Kapudan Pasha" Davud Pasha, with experienced corsairs such as Kemal Reis and Burak Reis among its commanders, sailed into the Ionian Sea. The Venetian fleet under Antonio Grimani was much smaller, about 95 ships, but these were heavier. The Battle of Zonchio was fought over four days, 12, 20, 22, and 25 August 1499. It was notable for the use of heavy naval artillery by the large sailing ships on both sides. In the first engagement most of the Venetian captains refused to join the fight; two Venetian carracks grappled with an Ottoman carrack, and all three burned and sank, killing Burak Reis and Venetian commander Andrea Loredan. The Venetian fleet failed to prevent the Ottoman fleet from entering the Gulf of Lepanto, and Grimani was blamed for the defeat, and was later exiled. Cut off from help, the Venetian garrison of Lepanto surrendered in August 1499. The victory established the Ottomans as a serious naval power in the Mediterranean. Ottoman land forces also began raiding Venetian Dalmatia.

In 1500 the Ottomans attacked Venice's ports in the Morea. Bayezid again commanded the army himself, besieged Modon while Kemal Reis bombarded it from sea; a Venetian relief fleet failed to break the blockade, and the city was captured on 9 August. Navarino fell in 1500, was recaptured by Kemal Reis in 1501. In late 1500 a Spanish–Venetian force captured Cephalonia, and in 1501 Feriz Beg captured Durazzo in Venetian Albania. Ottoman raids into Dalmatia led Venice to conclude a treaty with Hungary on 13 May 1501, and Venice paid Hungary an annual subsidy to defend its southern territories.

By 1502 Bayezid was threatening Venice with a big fleet, but his viziers were supportive of Venetian peace offers, and the Hungarian ambassador in Istanbul also asked the sultan for peace. A peace treaty was signed in 1502, Venice returned Leucas and, as in 1479, agreed to pay an annual sum of 10,000 gold ducats.

=== Domestic policy and initiatives ===
Bayezid's accession was followed by a reaction against some of the policies of Mehmed II. Because the ulema and their allies influenced him, Bayezid returned to their former owners most of the waqf properties and private holdings that Mehmed had taken over for the state, and he also removed from the palace the paintings by Italian artists that Mehmed had ordered. Mehmed's reform of the last years of his reign historians call it as primarily a fiscal measure. Many holdings in question remained in the hands of their earlier owners as timar-holders; its reversal under Bayezid therefore conciliated those who had opposed it more than it changed the structure of landholdings.

The reversal also effected the coinage. Between 1444 and 1481 the silver content of the "akçe" had been reduced by about 30 percent in debasements undertaken roughly every ten years, a policy that had met opposition from the ulema and other groups; after Mehmed's death Bayezid sought the support of these groups, because he feared that his brother Cem might become their candidate. He promised to end the practice, and the silver content of "akçe" changed very little between 1481 and 1585. Historians have described the reign as a period of consolidation in which many of the economic problems left by Mehmed's policies were resolved. Bayezid also refurbished the Ottoman army and navy with new technologies, laying a firm foundation for the conquests of his son Selim I and his grandson Suleiman I.

Trade was centred on Bursa, which was the principal Ottoman market for Iranian raw silk, exchanged there with Italian and other merchants for western woollen cloth. In 1490 Bayezid ordered the construction of the Koza Han, a caravanserai for the silk trade completed in 1491, whose revenues were assigned to the waqf of his mosque complex in Istanbul.

The foundation of the Edirne Complex was laid in May 1484, in a ceremony attended by the sultan himself, while he was in Edirne preparing the campaign against Kilia and Akkerman. The mosque was completed in 1488 according to the inscription over its portal by the calligrapher Şeyh Hamdullah. The architect is traditionally given as Mimar Hayruddin. Covering some 22,000 square metres on the north blank of the Tunca River, it comprised a mosque, guest houses ("tabhane"), a medical "medrese", a hospital ("darüşşifa"), a pharmacy, an "imaret" (soup kitchen), storage buildings, a bath and a bridge. The medical school, with eighteen domed rooms, trained its students in the adjoining hospital. According to Evliya Çelebi, who visited the complex, a group of ten musicians played for the patients three days a week under the great dome of the hospital, a form of treatment for the mentally ill that has made the building famous. The complex was placed on Turkey's Tentative List of World Heritage Sites in 2016. The Bayezid complex is the oldest imperial "külliye" in Istanbul that survives substantially in its original form.

=== Jewish and Muslim immigration ===
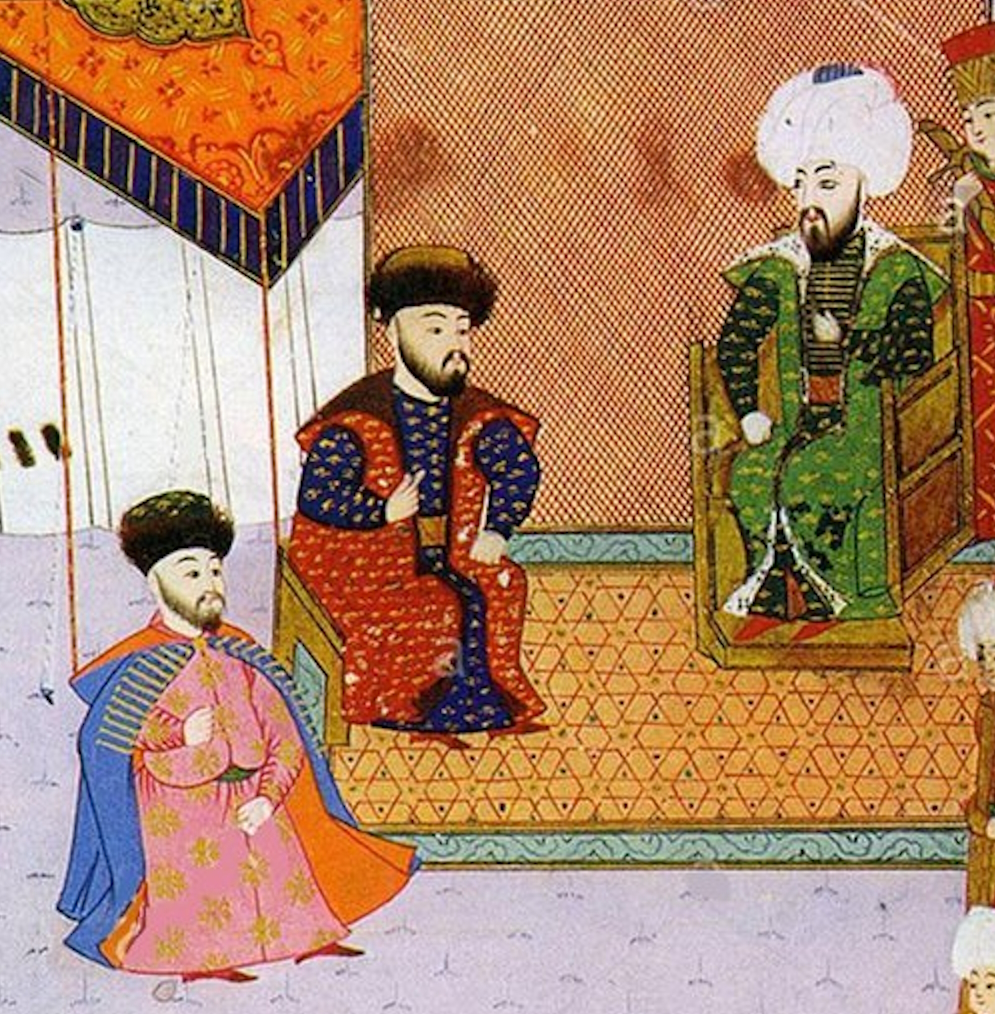
Crimean khan Meñli I Giray (centre) with the eldest son, Mehmed I Giray (left) and Bayezid II (right). 16th century Hünername

In July 1492, newly unified Spain expelled its Jewish and Muslim populations as part of the Spanish Inquisition. Bayezid II sent out the Ottoman Navy under the command of admiral Kemal Reis to Spain in 1492 in order to evacuate them safely to Ottoman lands. He sent out proclamations throughout the empire that the refugees were to be welcomed. He granted the refugees permission to settle in the Ottoman Empire and become Ottoman citizens. He ridiculed the conduct of Ferdinand II of Aragon and Isabella I of Castile in expelling a class of people so useful. "You venture to call Ferdinand a wise ruler," he said to his courtiers, "he who has impoverished his own country and enriched mine!" Bayezid addressed a firman to all the governors of his European provinces, ordering them not only to refrain from repelling the Spanish refugees, but to give them a friendly reception. He threatened with death all those who treated the Jews harshly or refused them admission into the empire. Moses Capsali, who probably helped to arouse the sultan's friendship for the Jews, was most energetic in his assistance to the exiles. He made a tour of the communities and was instrumental in imposing a tax upon the rich, to ransom the Jewish victims of the persecution.

The Muslims and Jews of al-Andalus contributed much to the rising power of the Ottoman Empire by introducing new ideas, methods and craftsmanship. The first printing press in Constantinople (now Istanbul) was established by the Sephardic Jews in 1493. It is reported that under Bayezid's reign, Jews enjoyed a period of cultural flourishing, with the presence of such scholars as the Talmudist and scientist Mordecai Comtino; astronomer and poet Solomon ben Elijah Sharbiṭ ha-Zahab; Shabbethai ben Malkiel Cohen, and the liturgical poet Menahem Tamar.

== Abdication and legacy ==
=== Abdication and death ===
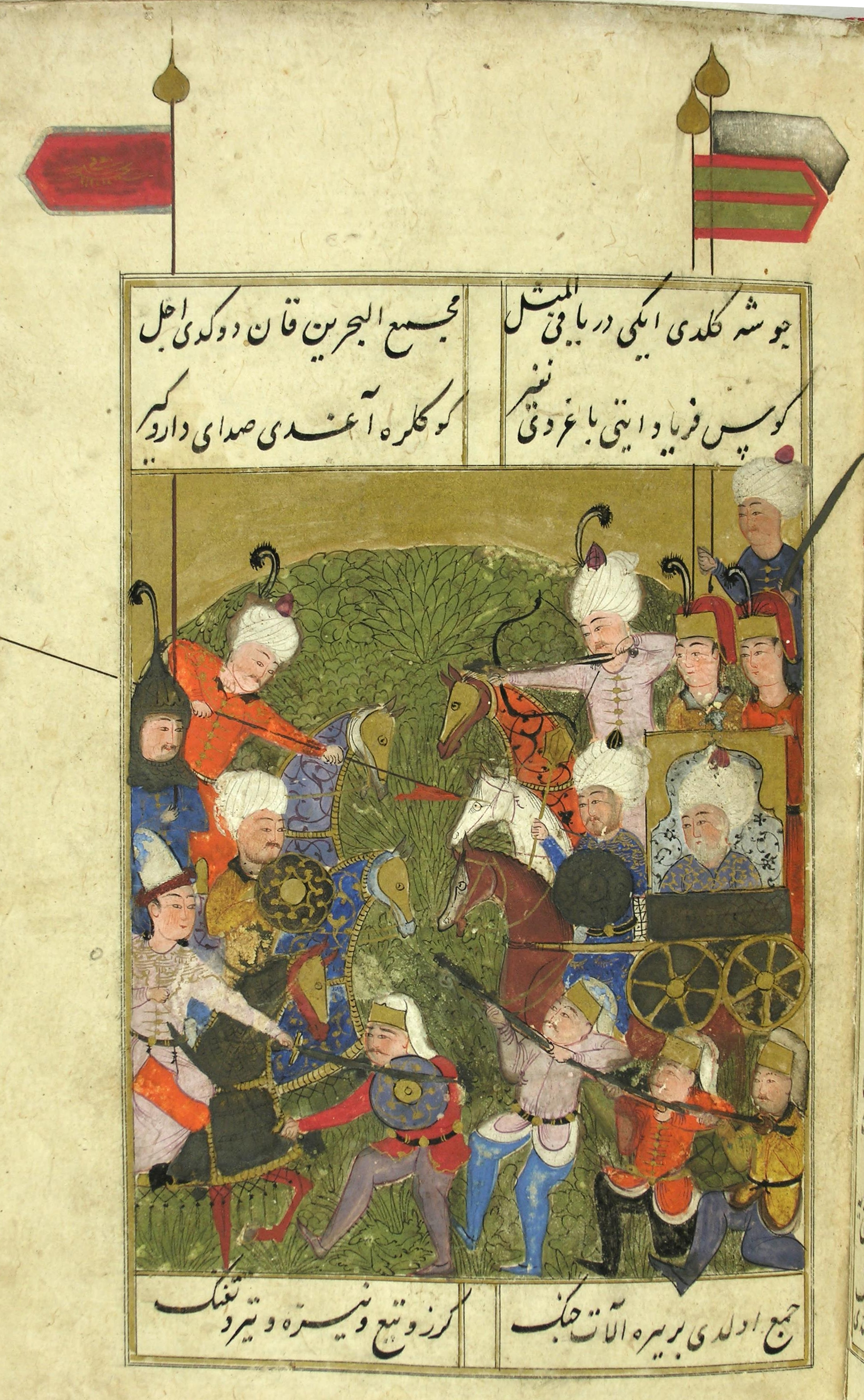
Bayezid II fighting his son Selim I at Uğraşdere

The last years of Bayezid's reign were overshadowed by his declining health and by rivalry among his three surviving sons, Ahmed, Selim and Korkut. Afflicted with gout and unable to go on campaign for years, Bayezid left the business of government largely to his viziers, notably Hadım Ali Pasha and Mustafa Pasha, who faced significant opposition.

The earthquake of 10 September 1509, known to Ottomans as the "Little Apocalypse" (Turkish: "Küçük Kıyamet"), added to the strain. It killed several thousand people in Istanbul and damaged the palace and the city walls. Bayezid mobilised as many as 66,000 labourers and levied extra taxes in 1510 to rebuild the city. Bayezid blamed the disaster on the failings of his viziers and commanders. By 1511 the sultan was holding court at Edirne.

Bayezid had apparently intended to leave the throne to Ahmed. He had appointed him governor of Amasya, the sanjak nearest to Istanbul, and promised him the succession, and most of the viziers supported Ahmed's claim. Selim, governor of Trabzon, and Korkut, governor of Teke, concluded that Ahmed would be preferred and left their sanjaks without permission to be closer to the capital: Korkut moved to Saruhan, while Selim, in September 1510, went to Kaffa in Crimea, where his son Süleyman was governor, and from there lobbied his father and the grand vizier against Ahmed's succession. Korkut is also said to have sought backing from the Mamluk Sultan in Egypt. In May 1511 Selim crossed the Black Sea with about a hundred ships and a force that included a thousand Tatars sent by the Crimean Khan. Akkerman refused to admit him, and he moved on through Kilia toward Edirne, saying that he wished only to kiss his father's hand. Bayezid was inclined to receive him, but Ahmed's supporters persuaded him that the march was a rebellion, and the dispute was resolved temporarily through the mediation of the scholar Sarıgörez Nureddin Efendi: Selim was given the sanjak of Semendire in the Balkans, and Bayezid promised not to enthrone Ahmed in his own lifetime. When his pashas urged him to attack Selim, he rebuked them as contrary to both religion and reason.

The compromise did not last. When Selim learned that the viziers were once again moving to bring Ahmed to the throne, he marched on Istanbul and caught up with his father near Çorlu, where Bayezid's army attacked and defeated him. Selim escaped by sea to Kaffa. Selim's supporters presented his march as an attempt to see his father and to forestall Ahmed, while his opponents described it as a rebellion. Meanwhile the pro-Safavid Şahkulu Rebellion in Teke had defeated and killed the beylerbeyi Karagöz Pasha, and in June 1511 Grand Vizier Hadım Ali Pasha crossed into Anatolia with Ahmed to suppress it. Ahmed damaged his standing with the army by pressing the soldiers to swear allegiance to him during the siege, and Ali Pasha was killed in the fighting that followed; the rebel Leader Şahkulu also died during the campaign. The death of the grand vizier and of his son Şehinşah in the same month badly shook Bayezid, aggravated his illness and led him to say that the would withdraw from the trone.

Ahmed's chances ended in September 1511, when the viziers brought him to Üsküdar to be enthroned. The Janissaries rioted against the pro-Ahmed viziers, demanded their dismissal and refused to accept him, and Bayezid had to give in. Bayezid II feared that Ahmed might in turn kill him to gain the throne, so he refused to allow his son to enter Constantinople. Ahmed withdrew to Anatolia, demanded Karaman and then occupied Konya, defying his father. Korkut, deceived by officials into thinking that the succession was open, reached Istanbul in March 1512 but was received coolly by the Janissaries and gave up his claim. Bayezid, who feared that Ahmed might ask Shah Ismail for help, and who could not resist the pressure of some of his advisors and of the Janissaries, finally yielded and allowed Selim to return to Istanbul. Selim was greeted outside the city by officials, soldiers and crowds; on 24 April 1512 Bayezid handed him the throne. Historians disagree on whether the abdication was voluntary. Selim escorted his father on foot beside his carriage as far as the Edirne Gate, from where Bayezid set out for Demotika, which Selim had granted him as his property.

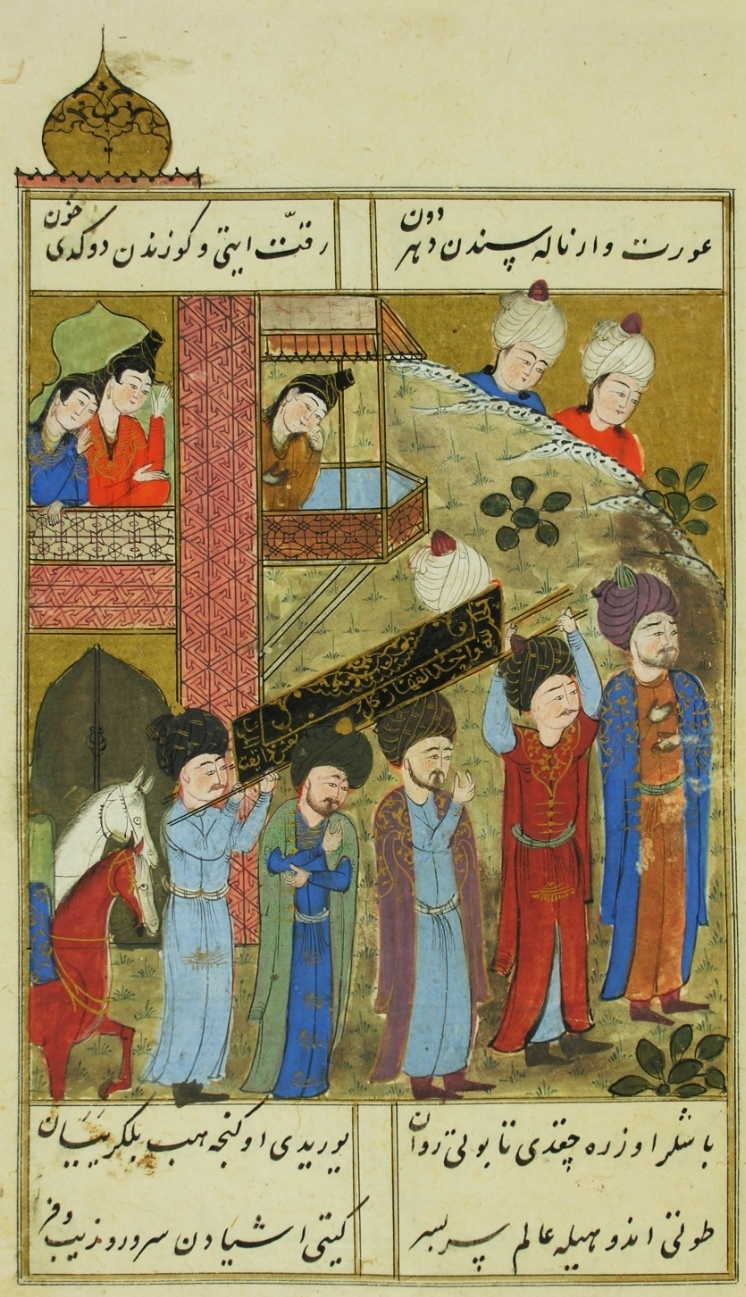
Bayezid II's burial

Bayezid died on the road near Söğütlü, close to Havsa, on 26 May 1512, and was buried in the türbe of his mosque in Istanbul. The succession struggle continued for another year, ending with the executions of Ahmed and Korkut in 1513.

=== Legacy ===
Bayezid was praised in a ghazal-style poem of Abdürrezzak Bahşı, a scribe who came to Constantinople from Samarkand in the second half of the 15th century and worked at the courts of Mehmed II and Bayezid II, and wrote in Chagatai with the Old Uyghur alphabet.

I had a pleasant time in your reign my Padishah.
I was without fear of all fears and dangers.
The fame of your justice and fairness reached to China and Hotan.
Thanks to God that there exist a merciful person like my Padishah.
Sultan Bayezid Khan ascended the throne.
This country had been his fate since past eternity.
Any enemy that denied the country of my master:
That enemy's neck had been in rope and gallows.
Your believing servants' faces smile like Bahşı's.
The place of those who walk unbelieving is hellfire.

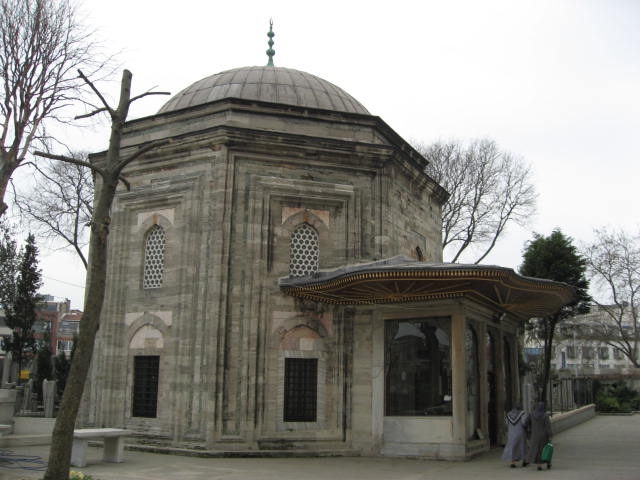
Tomb of Bayezid II in Istanbul

Bayezid II ordered al-ʿAtufi, the librarian of Topkapı Palace, to prepare a register. The library's diverse holdings reflect a cosmopolitanism that was encyclopaedic in scope.

== Family ==
=== Consorts ===
Bayezid had ten known consorts:

- Şirin Hatun, Başkadin, mother of Şehzade Abdullah, Bayezid's eldest son;
- Hüsnüşah Hatun, daughter of Nasuh Bey of Karaman and mother of Şehzade Şehinşah
- Bülbül Hatun, mother of Şehzade Ahmed, Bayezid's favorite son;
- Nigar Hatun, mother of Şehzade Korkut, regent of the Ottoman Empire;
- Gülruh Hatun; mother of Şehzade Alemşah
- Muhtereme Ferahşad Hatun; mother of Şehzade Mehmed
- Ayşe Gülbahar Hatun, the mother of Sultan Selim I, is said to have had one of two possible origins. The most widely accepted view is that she was the daughter of Alaüddevle Bozkurt Bey of the Dulkadirid dynasty. A less widely accepted theory suggests that she was a concubine.
- Gülfem Hatun;
- Mühürnaz Hatun.

=== Sons ===
Bayezid had at least eight sons:

- Şehzade Abdullah (c. 1465 – 6 November 1483) – son of Şirin Hatun. He was governor of Manisa, Trebizond and Konya. He died of unknown causes and was buried in Bursa. He married his cousin, Nergisşah (or Nergiszade) Ferahşad Sultan, daughter of Şehzade Mustafa, and had with her a son and two daughters.
- Şehzade Ahmed (c. 1466 – 24 March 1513) – son of Bülbül Hatun. Bayezid's favorite son, he was executed by his half-brother Selim I, who became sultan. He had at least seven concubines, seven sons and four daughters.
- Şehzade Alemşah (1466 – 1502) – son of Gülruh Hatun. Governor of Mentese and Manisa. He died of liver cirrhosis due to the unruly life he led. He had a son and two daughters:
  - Şehzade Osman Şah (1492–1512, executed by Selim I)
  - Ayşe Sultan, married in 1521 to his cousin Sultanzade Mehmed Çelebi, son of Sofu Fatma Sultan
  - Fatma Sultan (1493–1522), buried in the Gülruh's mausoleum, Bursa.
- Şehzade Korkut (Amasya, 1469 – Manisa, 10 March 1513) – son of Nigar Hatun. Rival of Selim I for the throne, he was first exiled by him and then executed. He had two children who died as infants and two daughters.
- Şehzade Şehinşah (c.1470 – 2 July 1511, buried in his half-brother Ahmed's mausoleum) - with Hüsnüşah Hatun. He was governor of Manisa and Karaman. He had a known consort, Mükrime Hatun (buried in her own mausoleum in Muradiye Complex, Bursa), five sons and a daughter.
- Selim I (Amasya, 10 October 1470 – Çorlu, 22 September 1520) – son with Gülbahar Hatun, he dethroned his father and became Sultan
- Şehzade Mahmud (1475 – 4 November 1507) – unknown motherhood, full-brother of Gevhermülük Sultan. He was governor of Kastamonu and Manisa. He had three sons and two daughters:
  - Şehzade Musa (1490–1512, executed by Selim I).
  - Şehzade Orhan (1494–1512, executed by Selim I).
  - Şehzade Emirhan Süleyman (?–1512, executed by Selim I).
  - Ayşe Hundi Sultan (1495–fl. 1556), married in 1508 to Ferruh Bey with whom she had a daughter:
    - Mihrihan Hanımsultan
  - Hançerli Zeynep Hanzade Fatma Sultan (1496–April 1533). It is believed that she may have educated the future Hürrem Sultan before she was introduced to Suleiman the Magnificent via Hafsa Sultan or Pargali Ibrahim. She married in 1508 to Mehmed Bey with whom she had two sons:
    - Sultanzade Kasim Bey (1511–1531)
    - Sultanzade Mahmud Bey
- Şehzade Mehmed (1484 – December 1504) – son of Ferahşad Hatun. Governor of Kefe. He married Ayşe Hatun, a princess of the Giray Khanate of Crimea. After his death, Ayşe married in 1511 his half-brother, Selim I. He had a daughter and two sons by unknown concubines:
  - Fatma Sultan (1500–1556)
  - Şehzade Alemşah
  - Şehzade Mehmed (1505, born posthumously – 1513, killed by Selim I).

=== Daughters ===
Bayezid II, once ascended to the throne, granted his daughters and granddaughters in the male line the title of "Sultan" and his granddaughters in the female line that of "Hanımsultan", which replaced the simple honorific "Hatun" in use until then. His grandsons in female line obtained instead the title of "Sultanzade". Bayezid's reform of female titles remains in effect today among the surviving members of the Ottoman dynasty.

Bayezid had at least sixteen daughters:

- Aynışah Sultan (c. 1463 – c. 1514) – daughter of Şirin Hatun. She married twice, she had two daughters and a son. Like her half-sister Ilaldi Sultan, she sent a congratulatory letter to her half-brother Selim when he became sultan.
- Hatice Sultan (c. 1463 – Bursa; 1500) – daughter of Bülbül Hatun. She married firstly in 1479 to Muderis Kara Mustafa Pasha and she was widowed in 1483, when her husband was executed on charges of supporting Şehzade Cem's claim to the throne against Bayezid. Hatice remarried the following year to Faik Pasha (d. 1499). She died in 1500 and was buried in her mausoleum, built by her son, in Bursa. Hatice built a mosque, school and fountain in Edirnekapi, Constantinople. She had two sons and two daughters:
  - Sultanzade Ahmed Bey – with Mustafa Pasha. Governor of Bursa. He built a mausoleum in memory of his mother
  - Hanzade Hanımsultan – with Mustafa Pasha
  - Sultanzade Mehmed Çelebi – with Faik Pasha
  - Ayşe Hanımsultan – with Faik Pasha.
- Hundi Sultan (c. 1464 – 1511) – daughter of Bülbül Hatun. In 1481 she married Hersekzade Ahmed Pasha and had two sons and four daughters:
  - Sultanzade Musa Bey
  - Sultanzade Mustafa Bey
  - Kamerşah Hanımsultan
  - Hümaşah Hanımsultan
  - Aynışah Hanımsultan
  - Mahdümzade Hanımsultan
- Ayşe Sultan (c. 1465 – 1515) – daughter of Nigar Hatun. She was married once and she had two sons and five daughters.
- Hümaşah Sultan (c. 1466 – before 1511). Also called Hüma Sultan, she married firstly in 1482 to Bali Pasha (d. 1495), governor of Antalya. She had a son and four daughters:
  - Sultanzade Hüseyin Şah Bey (d. 1566)
  - Hani Hanımsultan
  - Hüma Hanımsultan
  - Ümmi Hanımsultan, buried in Gebze beside her father
  - Şahzeman Hanımsultan
- Ilaldi Sultan (c. 1467 – c. 1517). She married Hain Ahmed Pasha (ex. 1524), governor of Rumelia, Egypt and Second Vizier. She sent a congratulatory letter to her brother Selim when he ascended the throne. She had a son and a daughter:
  - Sultanzade Koçî Bey; who married his cousin Hanzade Hanımsultan (daughter of Selçuk Sultan, daughter of Bayezid II) and had a son:
    - Ahmed Çelebi
  - Şahzade Aynişah Hanımsultan (? – fl. 1570); who married Abdüsselâm Çelebi. They had a daughter:
    - Ümmîhan Hanım
- Gevherimüluk Sultan (c. 1467 – 20 January 1550) – unknown motherhood, full-sister of Şehzade Mahmud. Married once, she had a son and a daughter.
- Sofu Fatma Sultan, (c. 1468 – after 1520, buried in her half-brother Ahmed's mausoleum) – daughter of Nigar Hatun. She was married firstly in 1479 to Isfendiyaroglu Mirza Mehmed Pasha (son of Kızıl Ahmed Bey), divorced in 1488 (after he remarried with Şahnisa Sultan, niece of Fatma); secondly in 1489 to Mustafa Pasha (son of Koca Davud Pasha), widowed in 1503; thirdly in 1504 to Güzelce Hasan Bey. She had three sons and a daughter:
  - Sultanzade Isfendiyaroglu Mehmed Pasha – with Isfendiyaroglu Mirza Mehmed Pasha. He married his cousin Gevherhan Sultan, daughter of Selim I.
  - Sultanzade Haci Ahmed Çelebi – with Güzelce Hasan Bey.
  - Sultanzade Mehmed Çelebi – with Güzelce Hasan Bey. In 1521 he married his cousin Ayşe Sultan (daughter of Şehzade Alemşah)
  - Fülane Hanımsultan – with Güzelce Hasan Bey. She married her cousin Ahmed Bey, son Ali Bey and Fatma Hanımsultan (daughter of Ayşe Sultan).
- Selçuk Sultan (c. 1469 – 1508). Called also Selçukşah Sultan. She was married firstly in 1484 to Ferhad Bey (d. 1485) with whom she had a son and a daughter. Selçuk Sultan remarried Mehmed Bey in 1487 and had three daughters with him.
  - Sultanzade Gazi Husrev Bey (1484 – 18 June 1541) – with Ferhad Bey
  - Neslişah Hanımsultan (c. 1486 – c. 1550) – with Ferhad Bey. She married Halil Pasha (executed 1540).
  - Hanzade Hanımsultan – with Mehmed Bey. She married his cousin Sultanzade Koçi Bey, son of Ilaldi Sultan and had a son:
    - Ahmed Çelebi
  - Hatice Hanımsultan – with Mehmed Bey; who married a son of Halil Pasha in 1510 and had a daughter:
    - Hanzade Hanım
  - Aslıhan Hanımsultan (c. 1487 – fl. 1529) – with Mehmed Bey; who married Yunus Pasha in 1502 (ex. 1517). She was remarried in 1518 to Defterdar Mehmed Çelebi, who was governor of Egypt and later of Damascus. From the second marriage, she had a daughter but died in childbirth because her age:
    - Selçuk Hanım (born on 21 February 1529)
- Sultanzade Sultan (ante 1470 – ?) – daughter of Hüsnüşah Hatun.
- Şah Sultan, (c. 1474 – fl. 1506). Also called Şahzade Şah Sultan. She was very charitable and built a mosque in 1506. She was buried in Bursa in the mausoleum of her half-sister Hatice Sultan. She married Nasuh Bey in 1490 and had a daughter:
  - Ismihan Hanımsultan
- Kamerşah Sultan (c. 1476 – January 1520, buried in her mother's mausoleum) – with Gülruh Hatun. Also called Kamer Sultan. She married Koca Mustafa Pasha in 1491 and widowed in 1512. After, she married Nişancı Kara Davud Pasha. She had a daughter and a son:
  - Hundi Hanımsultan – with Koca Mustafa Pasha. She married Mesih Bey.
  - Sultanzade Osman Bey – with Koca Mustafa Pasha. Buried in the Gülruh's mausoleum.
- Şahzade Sultan (died in 1520). She married Yahya Pasha and had three sons:
  - Sultanzade Yahyapaşazade Gazi Küçük Bali Pasha (? – 1543), in 1508 he married his cousin Devletşah Hanzade Hanimsultan, daughter of Aynişah Sultan.
  - Sultanzade Gazi Koca Mehmed Pasha (? – March 1548).
  - Sultanzade Gazi Ahmed Bey (? – after 1543).
- Fülane Sultan. She was married in 1489 to Koca Davud Pasha (d. 1498) and had a son:
  - Sultanzade Mehmed Bey, who married his cousin Fatma Sultan, daughter of Şehzade Ahmed.
- Fülane Sultan. She was married in 1498 to Gazi Yakub Pasha (d. 1502), remarried in 1504 to Mesih Bey.
- Fülane Sultan. She was married to Karlizade Mehmed Bey.

== In popular culture ==
- Sultan Bayezid II and his struggle with his son Selim is a prominent subplot in the video game Assassin's Creed: Revelations. In the game, due to Bayezid's absence from Constantinople, the Byzantines had the opportunity to sneak back into the city, hoping to revive their fallen empire. Near the end of the game, Bayezid surrendered the throne to his son Selim. However, Bayezid does not make an actual appearance.
- Bayezid II, prior to becoming Sultan, is depicted by Akin Gazi in the Starz series Da Vinci's Demons. He seeks an audience with Pope Sixtus IV (having been manipulated into believing that peace between Rome and Constantinople is a possibility), only to be ridiculed and humiliated by Sixtus, actions which later serve as a pretext for the Ottoman invasion of Otranto. Sixtus assumes that Bayezid has been overlooked in favor of his brother Cem.
- Bayezid II, prior to becoming Sultan, is depicted by Ediz Cagan Cakiroglu in the docuseries Rise of Empires: Ottoman. He appears on season 02 as a young prince who is motivated and inspired by his father Mehmed the Conqueror and wants to join him in battle despite being a child
- He is played by Urazbey Doğan (child), Mustafa Arda Işik (teenager) and Caner Topçu (adult) in Mehmed: Fetihler Sultanı

== See also ==
- Ottoman–Mamluk War (1485–1491)
- Polish–Ottoman War (1485–1503)

== Sources ==
- Babinger, Franz (1992). Mehmed the Conqueror and His Time. Princeton University Press. ISBN 978-0-691-01078-6.
- Fisher, Sidney Nettleton (1948). "Introduction" ( (PDF)). The foreign relations of Turkey (1481–1512). Utrecht University. Archived from the original on 2004-11-17.
- Uluçay, Mustafa Çağatay (2011). Padişahların kadınları ve kızları. Ankara: Ötüken. ISBN 978-9-754-37840-5.

Shirogorov, Vladimir (2021). War on the Eve of Nations: Conflicts and Militaries in Eastern Europe, 1450–1500. Rowman & Littlefield. ISBN 978-1-79362-241-9.

- Shaw, Stanford J.; Shaw, Ezel Kural (1976). History of the Ottoman Empire and Modern Turkey, Volume 1: Empire of the Gazis. Cambridge University Press. ISBN 978-0-521-29163-7.
- Pilat, Liviu; Cristea, Ovidiu (2017). "The Crusade against Ottomans and the Political Backdrop in East-Central Europe at the End of the Fifteenth Century". The Ottoman Threat and Crusading on the Eastern Border of Christendom during the 15th Century. Brill. pp. 242–285. doi:10.1163/9789004353800_008. ISBN 978-90-04-35380-0.

Giurescu, Constantin C. (1974). Chronological History of Romania. Editura enciclopedică română.

- Grabarczyk, Tadeusz (2010). "Cosmin Forest, Battle of". In Rogers, Clifford J. (ed.). The Oxford Encyclopedia of Medieval Warfare and Military Technology. Vol. 1. Oxford University Press.
- Marcu, George (2011). "Bătălia de la Lenţeşti (29 octombrie 1497)". Enciclopedia României (in Romanian).
- Kılıç, Ayşegül (2020). "Malkoçoğlu Bali Bey ve Mezarı Hakkında". Kafkas Üniversitesi Sosyal Bilimler Enstitüsü Dergisi (in Turkish) (26): 747–776. doi:10.9775/kausbed.2020.039.
- Kołodziejczyk, Dariusz (2000). Ottoman-Polish Diplomatic Relations (15th–18th Century): An Annotated Edition of ʻAhdnames and Other Documents. Leiden: Brill.
- Dunn, John P. (2022). "Mamlūk-Ottoman Wars". EBSCO Research Starters.
- Brummett, Palmira Johnson (1993). Ottoman Seapower and Levantine Diplomacy in the Age of Discovery. Albany: State University of New York Press. ISBN 978-0-7914-1702-7.
- Chase, Kenneth Warren (2003). Firearms: A Global History to 1700. Cambridge: Cambridge University Press. ISBN 978-0-521-82274-9.
- Finkel, Caroline (2006). Osman's Dream: The Story of the Ottoman Empire 1300–1923. London: John Murray. ISBN 978-0-7195-6112-2.
- Uyar, Mesut; Erickson, Edward J. (2009). A Military History of the Ottomans: From Osman to Atatürk. Santa Barbara: ABC-CLIO. ISBN 978-0-275-98876-0.
- Waterson, James (2022). The Knights of Islam: The Wars of the Mamluks, 1250–1517. Greenhill Books.
- Panaite, Viorel (2019). Ottoman Law of War and Peace: The Ottoman Empire and Its Tribute-Payers from the North of the Danube (2nd rev. ed.). Leiden: Brill.
- Șlapac, Mariana (2022). "Cetatea lui Ștefan cel Mare a Chiliei". Patrimoniul Cultural (in Romanian): 79–84. doi:10.52603/pc22.08.
- Pienaru, Nagy (2013). "Cronica otomană "Tarih-i Sultan Bayezid" (T.K.S.M., Fond Revan 1272)". Analele Putnei (in Romanian). 9 (1).
  - İnalcık, Halil (1989). "The Ottoman Turks and the Crusades, 1451–1522". In Hazard, Harry W.; Zacour, Norman P. (eds.). A History of the Crusades, Vol. VI: The Impact of the Crusades on Europe. Madison: University of Wisconsin Press.
  - Crowley, Roger (2011). City of Fortune: How Venice Ruled the Seas. Random House. ISBN 978-0-679-64426-2.
  - Abercrombie, Gordon Ellyson (2025). The Hospitaller Knights of Saint John at Rhodes 1306–1522. Pen and Sword. ISBN 978-1-39904-802-6.
  - Fisher, Sydney Nettleton (1948). The Foreign Relations of Turkey, 1481–1512. Urbana: University of Illinois Press.
  - Barzman, Karen-edis (2017). The Limits of Identity: Early Modern Venice, Dalmatia, and the Representation of Difference. Brill. ISBN 978-9004331518.
  - Goodwin, Godfrey (2013). The Janissaries. Saqi Essentials. ISBN 978-0-86356-781-0.
  - Raukar, Tomislav (1990). "Hrvatska na razmeđu XV i XVI. stoljeća". Senjski zbornik (in Croatian). 10 (1): 1–??.
  - Hylton, Raymond Pierre (2022). "Bayezid II". EBSCO Research Starters.Özel, Oktay (1999). "Limits of the Almighty: Mehmed II's "Land Reform" Revisited". Journal of the Economic and Social History of the Orient. 42 (2): 226–246. doi:10.1163/1568520991446848. hdl:11693/48561.
    - İnalcık, Halil (1960). "Bursa and the Commerce of the Levant". Journal of the Economic and Social History of the Orient. 3 (2): 131–147. doi:10.1163/156852060X00025.
    - Shaw, Stanford J. (1991). The Jews of the Ottoman Empire and the Turkish Republic. Basingstoke: Macmillan.
    - Navarro, David Domínguez (2017). "A Second Sephardic Golden Age: Economic Role of Iberian Jewry in the Sixteenth Century Ottoman Empire". Sephardic Horizons. 1 (3).
    - "Complex of Sultan Bayezid II, Edirne". Discover Islamic Art, Museum With No Frontiers.Inalcik, Halil (1973). The Ottoman Empire: The Classical Age 1300-1600.

Pamuk, Sevket (2000). A Monetary History of the Ottoman Empire. Cambridge University Press. ISBN 978-0-521-44197-1.

- Söylemez, Faruk (2012). "Yavuz Sultan Selim'in Taht Mücadelesi". Sosyal Bilimler Enstitüsü Dergisi (in Turkish) (33): 63–86.
- Emecen, Feridun M. (2011). Yavuz Sultan Selim (in Turkish). Istanbul: Yitik Hazine Yayınları.Inalcik, Halil (1973). The Ottoman Empire: The Classical Age 1300-1600.

Bayezid II House of Osman Born: Dec 3, 1447 Died: May 26, 1512
Regnal titles
Preceded by Mehmed II	Sultan of the Ottoman Empire; May 3, 1481 – April 25, 1512	Succeeded by Selim I
