= Battle of Tekirdağ =

1511 battle of an Ottoman Civil War

Battle of Tekirdag
- Part of the Ottoman Civil War (1509–1513)
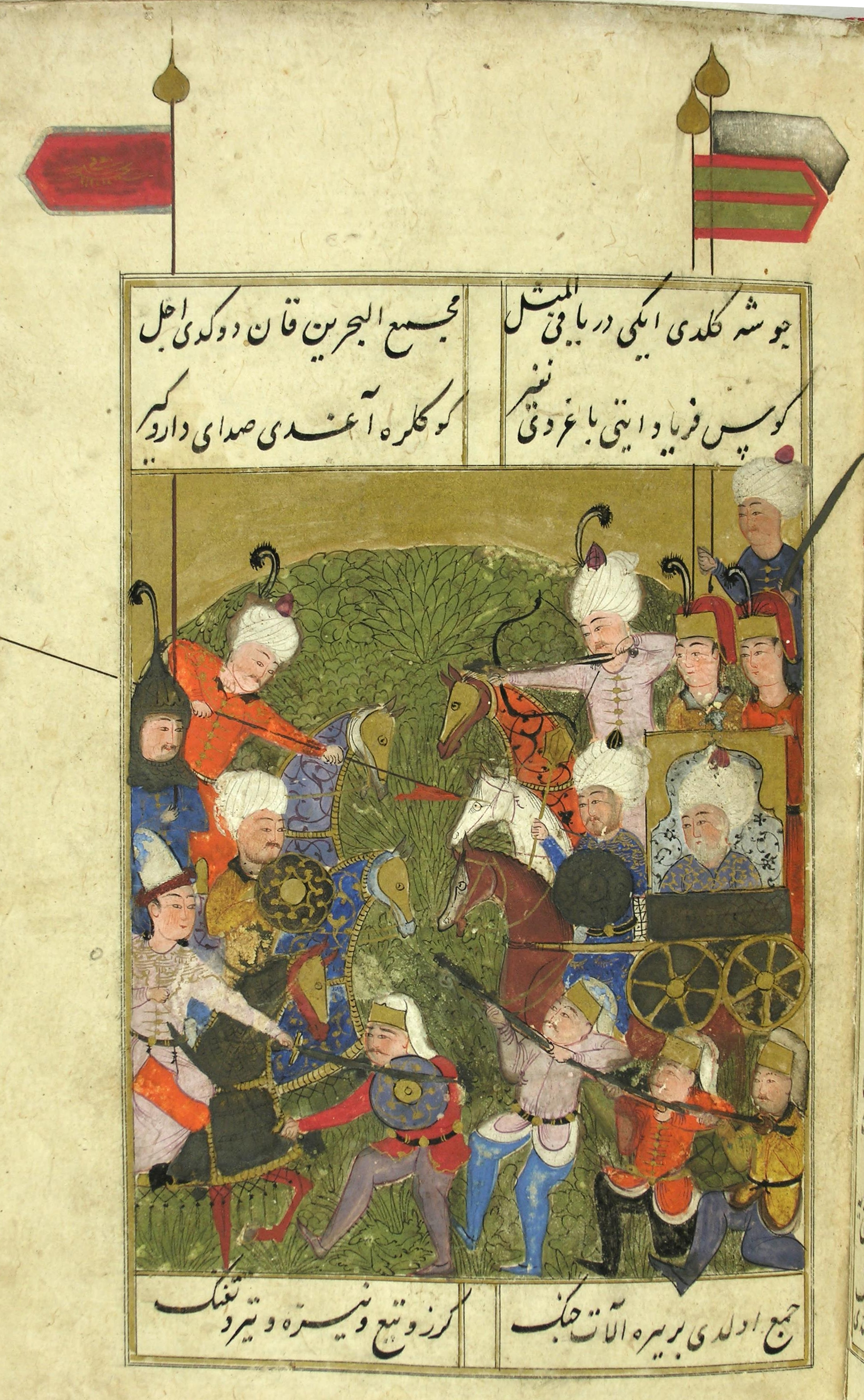
- The battle between Sultan Bayezid and Prince Selim
| Date | August 3, 1511 |
| Location | Tekirdağ, Çorlu |
| Result | Victory for Bayezid II |

Belligerents
| Army of Bayezid II | Army of Prince Selim |

Commanders and leaders
| Bayezid II | Şehzade Selim |

Strength
| 40,000; Many rifles and cannons | 20,000 |

Casualties and losses
| 700 | 8,000 |

The Battle of Tekirdağ or the Battle of Karshtiran was a battle of the Ottoman Civil War (1509–1513) that broke out in 1511 as a result of the disagreement between Prince Selim and Sultan Bayezid II. It is the first and last battle in which Selim I was defeated.

== Battle ==
As a result of Sultan Bayezid II choosing Prince Ahmed as his heir to the throne, Selim moved towards Edirne. He entered Edirne with the force of 20,000 people he gathered and from there he followed his father and came to Çorlu. Prince Selim's aim was not to wage a war. His aim was to show that he played a strong role in power. He even told his father that he wanted to send his men to talk to him. However, some people were provoking Bayezid and saying that Selim's coming with such an army was only for a bad purpose. Sultan Bayezid, who was angered by these, ordered Selim to be removed.

Some sources write that the party that started the war was Sultan Bayezid. Selim even told his soldiers not to raise their swords and not to resist unless an attack came from the other side.

But in reality, a fierce and serious battle took place between the two sides. Following his father's attack, Selim told the Tatar soldiers with him to carry out an encirclement operation, but they failed against the Kapıkulu soldiers. With the cannon and rifle fire, the Tatar cavalry dispersed and his army began to melt away. When Prince Selim saw what happened, to your horse jumped, broke the circle and managed to escape.

Sultan Bayezid had a tower built from the heads of Selim's murdered men. He counted the number of dead soldiers in the square and while his own army lost about 700 soldiers, Selim lost 8,000 soldiers.
