= Ottoman civil war =

Ottoman civil war may refer to a number of wars of succession within the Ottoman Empire:

- Ottoman Interregnum (1403–1413), the most well-known
- Ottoman Civil War (1509–1513)
- Ottoman Civil War (1559)

== See also ==
- Turkish civil war (disambiguation)
