= Şehzade Abdullah =

Şehzade Abdullah may refer to:

- Şehzade Abdullah (son of Bayezid II) (1465–1483), Ottoman prince, son of Bayezid II and Şirin Hatun
- Şehzade Abdullah (son of Suleiman the Magnificent) (1525–1528), Ottoman prince, son of Suleiman the Magnificent and Hürrem Sultan
