= Turkish civil war =

Turkish civil war may refer to:

- Hephthalite–Sasanian Wars
- Göktürk civil war
- Battle of Cow Lake
- Battle of Bolchu
- Bayırku Expedition
- Ottoman Interregnum
- Ottoman Civil War (1509–1513)
- Turkish War of Independence
- 1960 Turkish coup d'état
- Maoist insurgency in Turkey
- Political violence in Turkey (1976–1980)
- DHKP/C insurgency in Turkey
- 2016 Turkish coup attempt

== See also ==
- Ottoman civil war (disambiguation)
