= Şirin Hatun =

Concubine of Ottoman Sultan Bayezid II

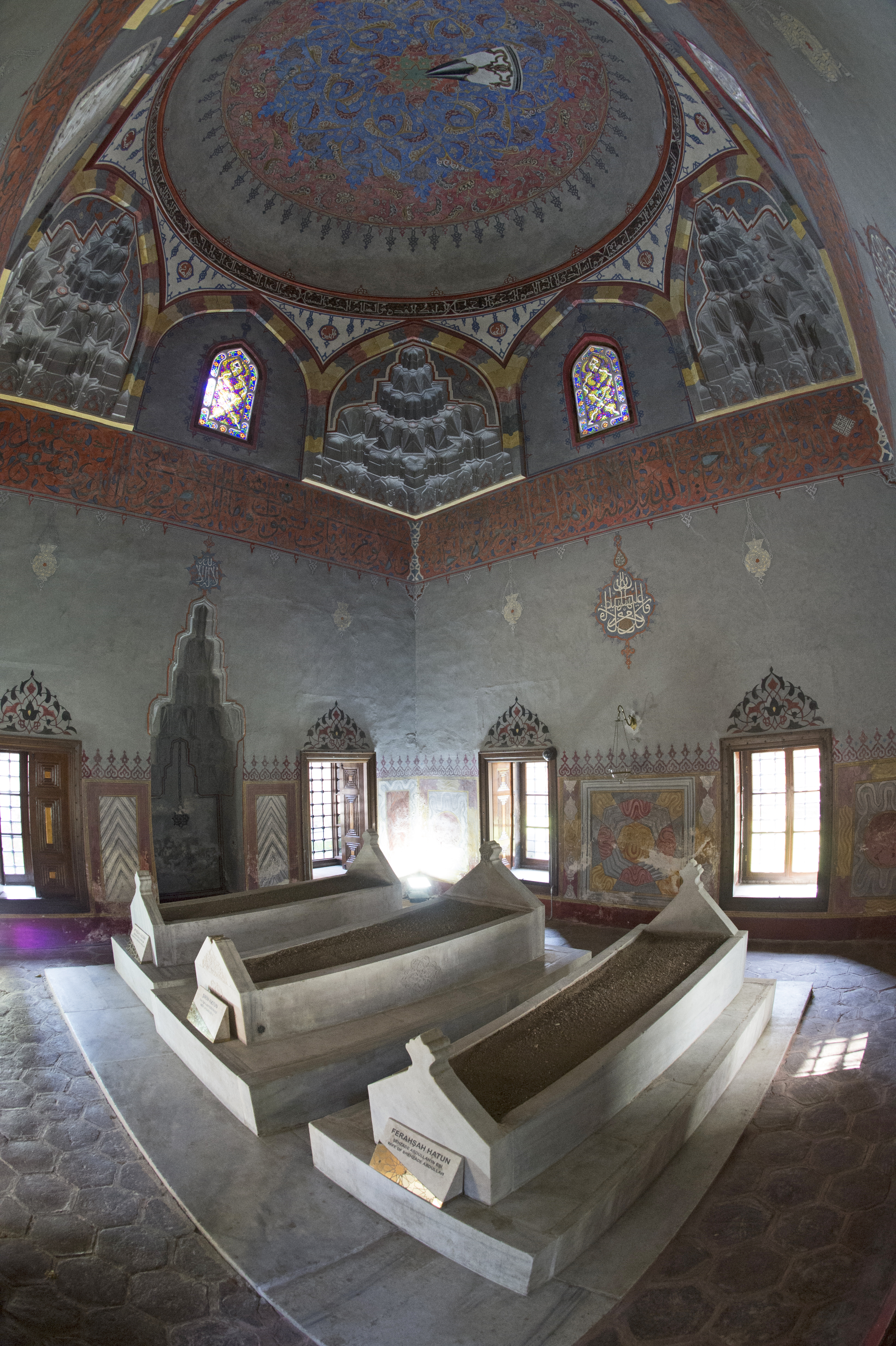
- The sarcophagus of Şirin Hatun (at center) located inside the Muradiye Complex, Bursa
- Born: c. 1447
- Died: c. 1521 (aged 73–74); Bursa, Ottoman Empire (present day Bursa, Turkey)
- Burial: Muradiye Complex, Bursa
- Consort: Bayezid II
- Issue: Aynışah Sultan; Şehzade Abdullah
- Religion: Sunni Islam

Şirin Hatun (Ottoman Turkish: شیریں خاتون; died in 1521) was a concubine of Sultan Bayezid II of the Ottoman Empire.

== Life ==
Her origin is unknown, but the consorts of the Ottoman sultans were by custom normally concubines of Christian origin, who came to the Ottoman Imperial harem via the Ottoman slave trade, and converted to Islam and given a slave name after their arrival.

Şirin entered Bayezid's harem when he was still a prince, and the governor of Amasya. She gave birth to Bayezid's eldest daughter Aynışah Sultan in 1463, and his eldest son Şehzade Abdullah in 1465. When Bayezid became Sultan, she assunsed the rank of Başkadin as mother of Sultan's eldest son.

According to Turkish tradition, all princes were expected to work as provincial governors as a part of their training. In 1467–68, Şirin accompanied Abdullah, when was sent to Manisa, and then to Trabzon in early 1470s. In 1480, the two returned to Manisa, and following the 1481 succession struggle to Konya.

The Sultan had granted her the village of Emakin in Mihaliç. She endowed two schools, one in Bursa, and the other in Mihaliç. She also built two mosques, one in Eynesil, and the other known as "Hatuniye Mosque" located inside Trabzon Castle in 1470. For her endowments, she allocated the villages of Kabacaağaç and Kadi in Şile, as well as four existing mills on Koca Dere Creek in Şile.

After the death of Şehzade Abdullah in 1483, Şirin retired to Bursa. In retirement, she built a tomb for Abdullah, in which she, her daughter-in-law and her granddaughter were also buried upon their death.

== Issue ==
From Bayezid II, Şirin had a daughter and a son:

- Aynışah Sultan (Amasya, c. 1463 - Bursa, c. 1514). She married Ahmed Beg in 1490 and had with him two daughters, Hanzade Hanimsultan and Neslihan Hanimsultan, and a son, Sultanzade Zeyneddin Bey. She was buried in Bursa with her mother and brother.
- Şehzade Abdullah (Amasya; 1465 - Konya; 6 November 1483). Bayezid's first son, he died of unknown causes and was buried in Bursa. In 1480 he married his cousin Nergiszade Ferahşad Sultan (called also Nergisşah Ferahşah, she was the daughter of Şehzade Mustafa. She was buried in Bursa, in Şirin Hatun's mausoleum), and they had a son and two daughters.

== Sources ==
- Sakaoğlu, Necdet (2008). Bu mülkün kadın sultanları: Vâlide sultanlar, hâtunlar, hasekiler, kadınefendiler, sultanefendiler. Oğlak Yayıncılık. ISBN 978-9-753-29623-6.
- Uluçay, Mustafa Çağatay (2011). Padişahların kadınları ve kızları. Ankara: Ötüken. ISBN 978-9-754-37840-5.
