= Battle of Yenişehir (1513) =

1513 battle

- Part of the Ottoman Civil War (1509–1513)
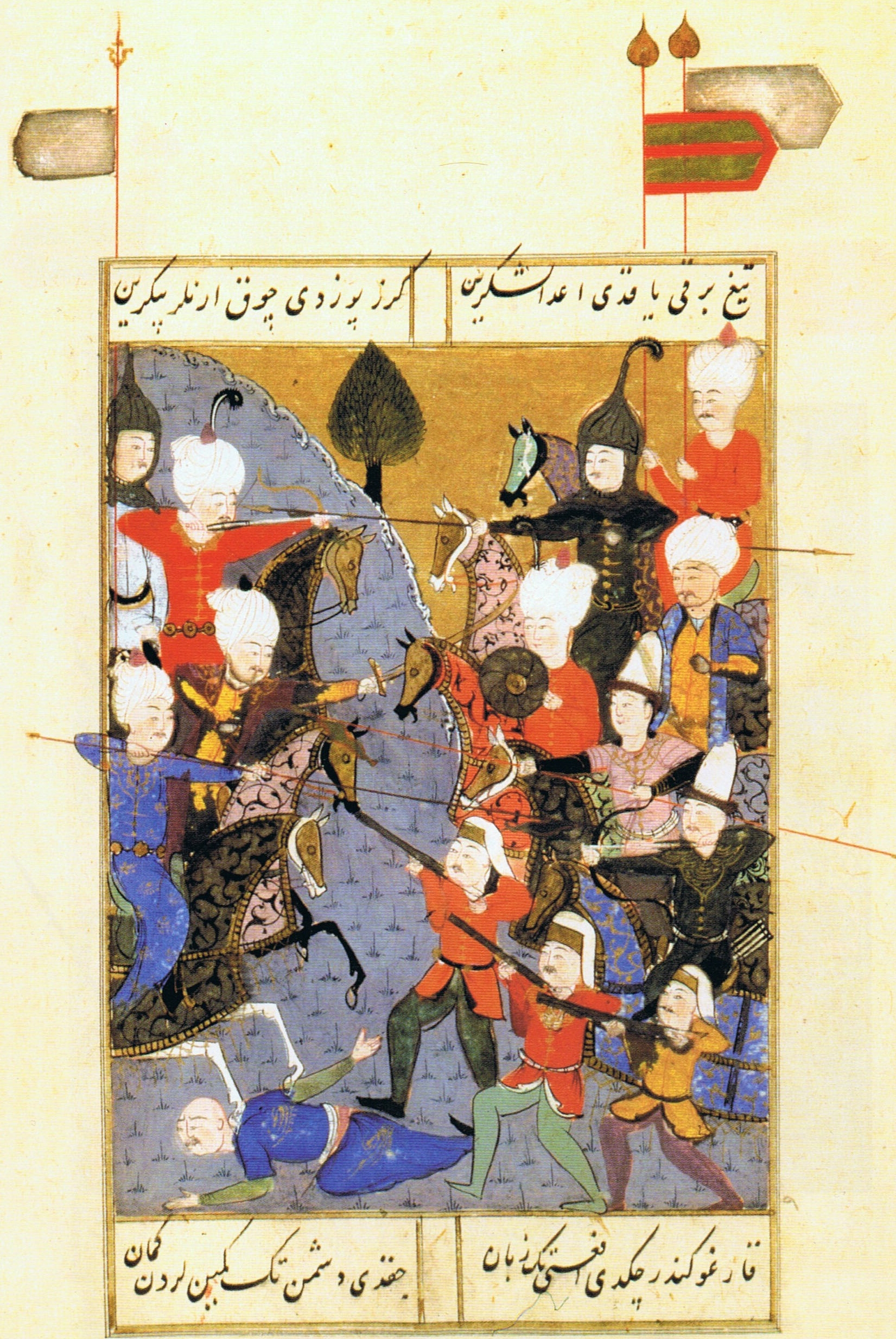
- The Battle of Yenişehir
Date	24 April 1513
Location	Yenişehir, Bursa
Result	Victory for Selim; Execution of Şehzade Ahmed; End of the fight for the throne between Selim and Ahmed

Commanders and leaders
Selim I Bıyıklı Mehmed Pasha	Şehzade Ahmed (executed) other Sehzade’s

Strength
30,000	5,000

Casualties and losses
Less	Heavy

The Battle of Yenişehir took place between Yavuz Sultan Selim and his brother, Şehzade Ahmed, in 1513. It was the last conflict of the Ottoman Civil War (1509–1513), as Selim's victory secured his legitimacy as Sultan of the Ottoman Empire.

== Background ==
Sultan Bayezid II abdicated, and his son Selim was enthroned in Istanbul on April 24, 1512. Yavuz's elder brother, Şehzade Ahmed, did not accept this and declared his reign in Konya, establishing a government there. Sehzade Suleyman was appointed as the Istanbul guard. Sultan Selim entered Bursa with his forces and his nephew, Şehzade Alaaddin, who was the governor of the city, fled. Yavuz, who spent the winter here, wrote fake letters to his elder brother Şehzade Korkut, who was the governor of Manisa, in the mouth of his Pashas, inviting him to rebellion. Şehzade Korkut, who answered in the affirmative, was executed, and Yavuz had no rivals other than his elder brother.

Ahmed Sultan, who was in Afyon, first withdrew to Ankara and then to Malatya after Malkoçoğlu Turali Bey attacked him and sent his two sons to Ismail I to ask for help. Yavuz; This time, he wrote fake letters to his brother in the mouth of their Pasha, writing that in case of a war they would change sides and arrest Yavuz. Believing these words, Ahmed Sultan marched against his brother from Amasya, which he had already occupied, with a force of about 5,000.

== Battle ==
Learning that his brother had come upon him, Yavuz Sultan Selim prepared his army to implement the last stage of his plan and went to Yenişehir to meet him. Ahmed Sultan, who dispersed the vanguard of Yavuz, met his brother in Yenişehir on Sunday, April 24. A bloody war ensued. The large irregular army of Ahmed Sultan could not destroy the small number of regular army and suffered many casualties in the face of firepower. When the pasha realized that his letters were also lies, he tried to escape, but it was too late. Already trapped by the flip movement, Ahmed Sultan made his last stand, but he was caught by his Prince Osman and they were strangled with a bowstring by the Kapıcıbaşı Sinan Ağa. the tactic was also used by another military genius.

== Aftermath ==
Ahmed Sultan, who was strangled on the battlefield, was buried in Bursa. His son, Osman, was also executed and buried in Amasya. Şehzade Murad fled to Iran, while Süleyman and Alaaddin Şehzades fled to Egypt. According to rumors, the fleeing Princes died in the countries they fled to for various reasons. After all this, Yavuz Sultan Selim, who ended the fight for the throne, has now finished the internal turmoil and turned his eyes to the growing external problems in the East.

== Sources ==
- Cipa, H. Erdem (2017). The Making of Selim: Succession, Legitimacy, and Memory in the Early Modern Ottoman World. Indiana University Press.
- Finkel, Caroline (2005). Osman's Dream: The History of the Ottoman Empire. Basic Books.
- Kamar, M., 2020. Türk ve İslâm hâkimiyet telâkkileri çerçevesinde isyan suçu. Astana Yayınları.
- Şahin, B., 1994. Osmanlı ansiklopedisi. İstanbul: Ağaç Yayıncılık.
- Uluçay, C., 1961. Taht uğrunda baş veren sultanlar. İstanbul: de University of Michigan.
