= Bülbül Hatun =

Concubine of Ottoman Sultan Bayezid II

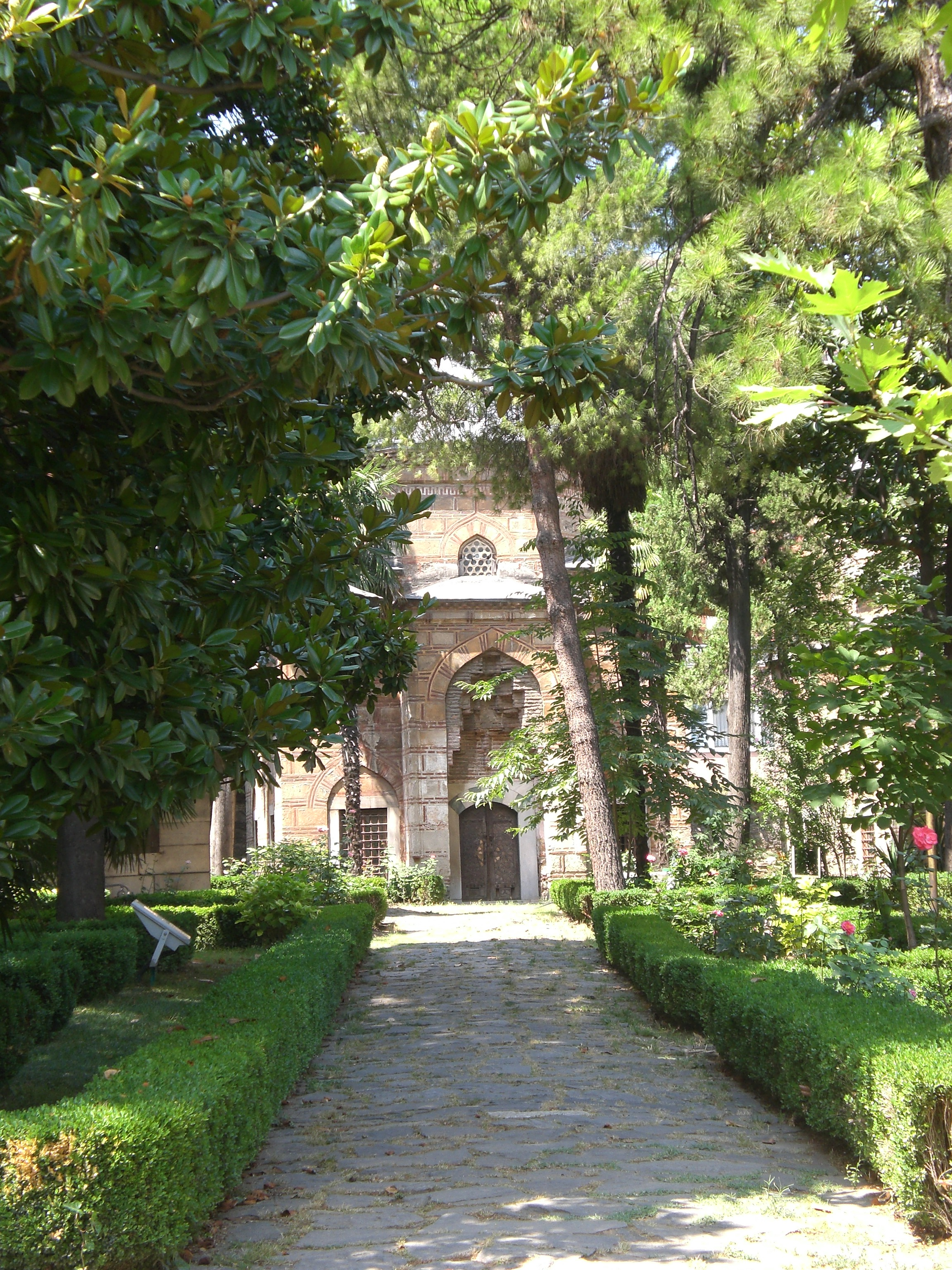
- The tomb of Bülbül Hatun is located inside the Muradiye Complex, in Bursa
- Died: c. 1515; Bursa, Ottoman Empire (present day Bursa, Turkey)
- Burial: Muradiye Complex, Bursa
- Spouse: Bayezid II
- Issue: Hatice Sultan; Hundi Sultan; Şehzade Ahmed
- Religion: Sunni Islam

Bülbül Hatun (Ottoman Turkish: بلبل خاتون; died c. 1515) was a concubine of Sultan Bayezid II of the Ottoman Empire.

== Life ==
Her origin is unknown, but the consorts of the Ottoman sultans were by custom normally concubines who came to the Ottoman Imperial harem via the Ottoman slave trade.

Bülbül Hatun entered Bayezid's harem when he was still a prince and the governor of Amasya. She had three children, two daughters, Hatice Sultan and Hundi Sultan, and a son, Şehzade Ahmed.

According to Turkish tradition, all princes were expected to work as provincial governors as a part of their training. Ahmed was sent to Çorum in 1480, and then to Amasya, and Bülbül accompanied him.

She built and endowed a mosque and a soup kitchen in Ladik. At Amasya, she built another mosque, a school and a fountain. In Bursa she had endowed and built a religious college. She endowed a portion of her properties to the Enderun mosque in 1505.

In 1512, she built another complex and endowed a significant amount of property for its expenses. She designated her son Ahmed, and upon his death Ahmed's eldest daughter and her daughters, as the administrator of the endowment. Bülbül's delegation of the regency of the endowment through the matrilineal line after his son Ahmed demonstrated that this endowment was established as a precautionary measure in the event that Ahmed failed in his bid for the sultanate.

In 1513, Fatma Sultan, daughter of Şehzade Mahmud (son of Bayezid II), and her husband Mehmed Çelebi were placed under house arrest following the Kızılbaş leanings. She was only pardoned following Bülbül's intercession.

== Death ==
After the death of Şehzade Ahmed in 1513, Bülbül Hatun came to Bursa. She built a tomb for Ahmed, in which she was too buried at her death in 1515.

== Issue ==
Together with Bayezid, Bülbül had at least two daughters and a son:

- Hatice Sultan (Amasya; 1463 - Bursa; 1500). She married in first time Muderis Kara Mustafa Pasha in 1479 and she had a son, Sultanzade Ahmed Bey and a daughter, Hanzade Hanimsultan. She was widowed in 1483, when her husband was executed on charges of supporting Şehzade Cem's claim to the throne against Bayezid. Hatice remarried the following year to Faik Pasha (died 1499) and had a son, Sultanzade Mehmed Çelebi, and a daughter, Ayşe Hanımsultan. She died in 1500 and was buried in her mausoleum, built by her son, in Bursa. Hatice built a mosque, school and fountain in Edirnekapi, Constantinople.
- Hundi Sultan (Amasya, c. 1464 - 1511), married in 1484 to Hersekzade Ahmed Pasha and had least two sons, Sultanzade Musa Bey and Sultanzade Mustafa Bey, and at least four daughters, Kamerşah Hanimsultan, Hümaşah Hanimsultan, Aynışah Hanımsultan and Mahdümzade Hanımsultan.
- Şehzade Ahmed (Amasya, c. 1466 - Yenişehir, 24 March 1513). Governor of Corum (1481-1483) and of Amasya (1483–1513); was the main rival for the throne of his half-brother Selim I.

== Sources ==
- Al-Tikriti, Nabil Sirri (2004). Şehzade Korkud (ca. 1468-1513) and the Articulation of Early 16th Century Ottoman Religious Identity – Volume 1 and 2.
- Peirce, Leslie P. (1993). The Imperial Harem: Women and Sovereignty in the Ottoman Empire. Oxford University Press. ISBN 978-0-195-08677-5.
- Sakaoğlu, Necdet (2008). Bu mülkün kadın sultanları: Vâlide sultanlar, hâtunlar, hasekiler, kadınefendiler, sultanefendiler. Oğlak Yayıncılık. ISBN 978-9-753-29623-6.
- Uluçay, M. Çağatay (1985). Padişahların kadınları ve kızları. Türk Tarih Kurumu.
- Evg Radushev (2003). Inventory of Ottoman Turkish documents about Waqf preserved in the Oriental Department at the St. St. Cyril and Methodius National Library: Registers. Narodna biblioteka "Sv. sv. Kiril i Metodiĭ. Orientalski otdel, International Centre for Minority Studies and Intercultural Relations, Research Centre for Islamic History, Art, and Culture. Narodna biblioteka "Sv. sv. Kiril i Metodiĭ.
- Yardımcı, İlhan (1976). Bursa tarihinden çizgiler ve Bursa evliyaları. Türdav Basım, Yayım.
