= Aynışah Sultan =

Ottoman princess (1463–1514)

- Born: c. 1463; Amasya, Ottoman Empire (now Amasya, Turkey)
- Died: c. 1514 (aged 50–51); Bursa, Ottoman Empire (now Bursa, Turkey)
- Burial: Alemdar, Fatih, Istanbul
- Spouse: Ahmad Beg (m. 1490; died 1497); Yahya Pasha (m. 1501; died 1511)
- Issue: first marriage Neslihan Hanımsultan; Devletşah Hanzade Hanımsultan; Sultanzade Zeyneddin Bey
Names
- Turkish: Hatice Aynışah Sultan; Ottoman Turkish: خدیجه عینی شاہ سلطان
- House: Ottoman (by birth); Aq Qoyunlu (by marriage I)
- Father: Bayezid II
- Mother: Şirin Hatun
- Religion: Sunni Islam

Hatice Aynışah Sultan (Ottoman Turkish: خدیجه عینی شاہ سلطان; c. 1463 – c. 1514) was an Ottoman princess, daughter of Sultan Bayezid II (reign 1481–1512) and half-sister of Sultan Selim I (reign 1512–1520) of the Ottoman Empire.

== Life ==
Aynışah Sultan, was born in Amasya in 1463, during her father's princedom. Her mother was his consort Şirin Hatun; thus she had one younger full-brother, Şehzade Abdullah, born in 1465, who died in 1483 (the first son of Bayezid). She was the eldest child of her father.

In 1489 or 1490, Aynışah was married firstly to Göde Sultanzade Ahmed Bey, son of Muhammad Mirza Ugurlu of the Aq Qoyunlu and her aunt Gevherhan Hatun and thus her own cousin. There is a possibility that, since Ahmed had already been living in the Sultan's court for a long time, the marriage took place at an even earlier date. Göde Ahmed later took part in the fight for the Aq Qoyunlu throne and was eventually murdered, during an uprising in Azerbaijan on 14 December 1497, after a brief rule over the Aq Qoyunlu lands.

At the turn of the 1500s or a little later, as evidenced by a list of gifts, Aynışah was married secondly to Yahya Pasha, a prominent statesman and military man under her father and grandfather Sultan Mehmed the Conqueror, and head of what became an influential clan of frontier officials. Of Albanian origin, he was appointed twice sanjak-bey (provincial governor) of Bosnia and Nicopolis, twice Beylerbey (governor-general) of Anatolia, thrice Beylerbey of Rumeli, Second Vizier in July 1505, and supposedly, briefly Grand Vizier in 1505. He died at Edirne in mid-1511.

Aynışah kept correspondence with both her father, Bayezid, and brother Selim, as has been proven by surviving letters of hers.

She was still alive and on good terms with the latter when he deposed the former in 1512, as evident in a letter she, like her sister Ilaldi, wrote him to congratulate him on his ascension.

In around 1506, she built a mekteb (meaning elementary school) in Alemdar vicinity of Fatih, Istanbul, close to where Hacı Beşir Ağa Külliye (meaning Complex) was later erected. To this school she bequeathed her property.

She was buried at her foundation in Alemdar, Fatih, Istanbul.

== Issue ==
With Göde Ahmed, Aynışah had two daughters and a son:

- Neslihan Hanımsultan; married to Şehzade Alaeddin, son of Şehzade Ahmed, himself one of Aynışah's half-siblings. She had a daughter, Hvandi Sultan, married to Sunullah Bey, sanjak-bey of Kastamonu.
- Devletşah Hanzade Hanımsultan; married in 1508 her cousin Sultanzade Kücük Bali Bey, son of Şahzade Sultan (daughter of Bayezid II). The union was a failure, as the couple lived in separation and the princess, per a report of her behaviour to Sultan Selim in 1516, engaged in a string of scandalous acts. Caught committing adultery with a man at Skopje, who was killed along with six members of her household, she then relocated against permission to Istanbul where she took a young Quran reciter, known as Dellakoğlu Bak, as a lover, bearing him a daughter who died aged approximately six months old. Upon his death of malaria at Babaeski, en route from Edirne to Istanbul, she found a new companion in his brother. The letter's author, most likely Selim's son and her own cousin, the future Suleiman the Magnificent, then based at Edirne, credited her acts to the help of her ″boundless and unparalleled″ wealth and several named procuring servants.
- Sultanzade Zeyneddin Bey (May/June 1497 - 1508); reportedly born the same day that news of Göde Ahmed's takeover of the Ağ Qoyunlu throne was received.

== Sources ==
- Ayvansaray-i, Hafiz Hueseyin; Crane, Howard (2000). The Garden of the Mosques: Hafiz Hüseyin Al-Ayvansarayî's Guide to the Muslim Monuments of Ottoman Istanbul. Istanbul: Brill.
- Faroqhi, Suraiya N.; Fleet, Kate, eds. (2012). The Cambridge History of Turkey Volume 2: the Ottoman Empire as a World Power 1453-1603. Cambridge University Press.
- Fodor, Pál (2019). "Wolf on the Border: Yahyapaşaoğlu Bali Bey (?-1527)". In Fodor, Pál; Kovács, Nándor Erik; Péri, Benedek (eds.). Şerefe. Studies in Honour of Prof. Géza Dávid on His Seventieth Birthday. Budapest: Research Centre for the Humanities, Hungarian Academy of Sciences. pp. 57–87. Retrieved on 18 April 2020.
- Mehmed Süreyya Bey; Ali Aktan; Abdülkadir Yuvalı; Mustafa Keskin (1995). Tezkire-i meşâhir-i Osmaniyye. Sebil Yayınevi.
- Sakaoğlu, Necdet (2008). Bu mülkün kadın sultanları: Vâlide sultanlar, hâtunlar, hasekiler, kadınefendiler, sultanefendiler. Oğlak Yayıncılık. p. 303.
- Şapolyo, Enver Behnan (1961). Osmanlı sultanları tarihi. Istanbul: R.Zaimler Yayınevi.
- Tezcan, Hülya (2006). Osmanlı çocukları: şehzadeler ve hanım sultanların yaşlamarı ve giysileri. Istanbul: Aygaz Yayınları.
- Uluçay, M.Cağatay (1956). Harem'den mektuplar I. Vakit matbaasi.
- Uluçay, Mustafa Çağatay (2011). Padışahların kadınları ve kızları. Türk Tarihi Kurumu Yayınları.
