= Şehzade Ahmed (son of Bayezid II) =

Ottoman prince (c. 1466 – 1513)

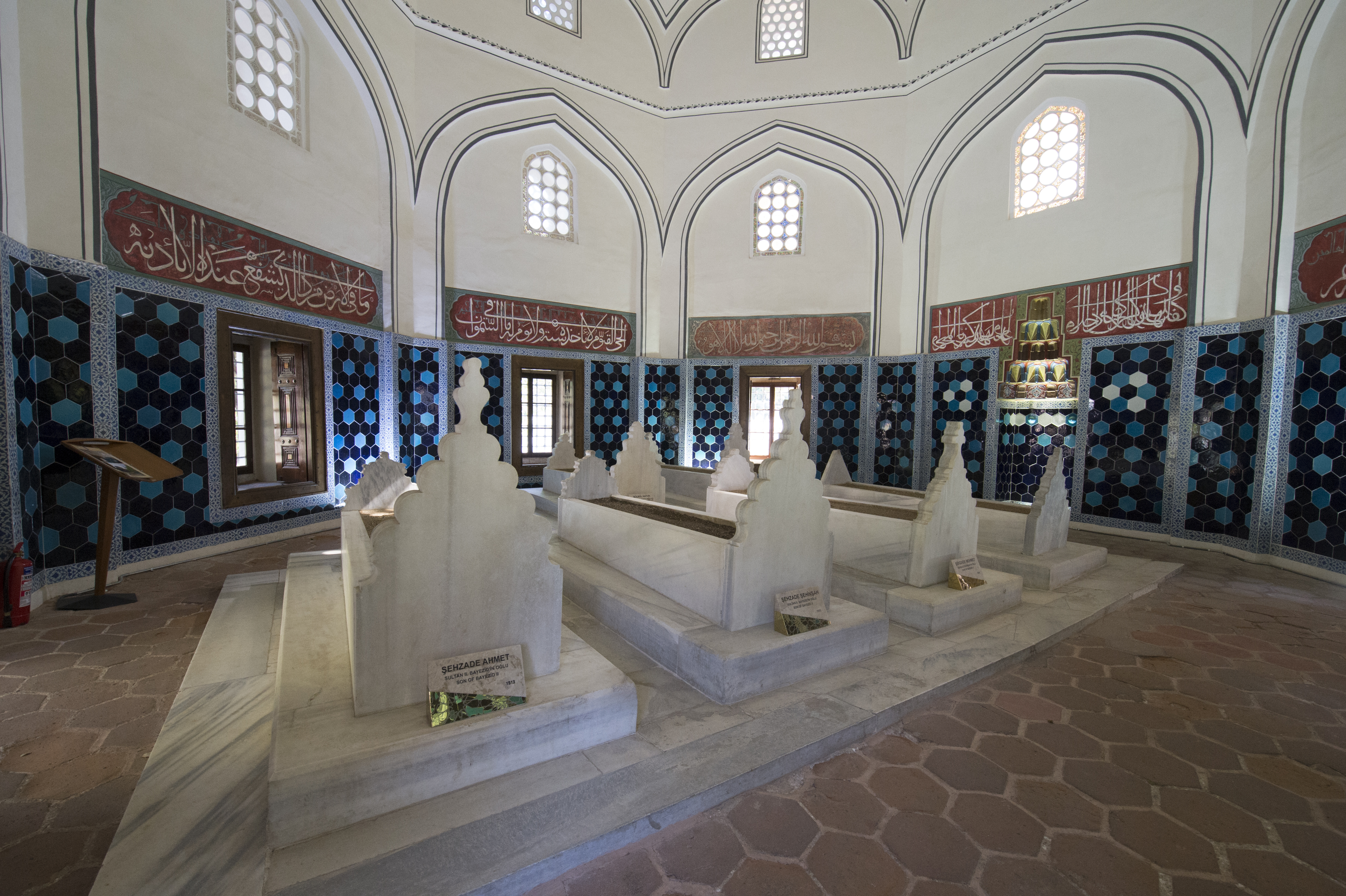
- Sarcophagus of Ahmed (left), Muradiye Complex, Bursa
- Born: c. 1466; Amasya, Ottoman Empire
- Died: 24 April 1513 (aged 46–47); Yenişehir, Bursa, Ottoman Empire
- Burial: Muradiye Complex, Bursa
- Spouse: Sittişah Hatun; Gülçiçek Hatun; Bülbül Hatun; Feraşad Hatun
- Issue: Şehzade Süleyman; Şehzade Alaeddin; Şehzade Osman; Şehzade Murad; Şehzade Ali; Şehzade Mehmed; Şehzade Kasim; Kamerşah Sultan; Fatma Sultan; Fahrihan Sultan; Hanzade Sultan
Names
- Turkish: Şehzade Ahmed; Ottoman Turkish: شہزادہ احمد
- Dynasty: Ottoman
- Father: Bayezid II
- Mother: Bülbül Hatun
- Religion: Sunni Islam

Şehzade Ahmed (Ottoman Turkish: احمد; c. 1466 – 24 April 1513) was an Ottoman prince, son of Sultan Bayezid II and his concubine Bülbül Hatun. He was considered his father's favorite to succeed him on the throne, and attempted to defend his claim during the Ottoman Civil War (1509–1513), fought primarily against his younger brother, Selim. Ahmed ultimately lost the war and was executed by Selim after the latter usurped the Sultanate.

== Background ==
Ahmed was born to Bayezid II, the 8th sultan of the Ottoman Empire, and one of his concubines, Bülbül Hatun. He was Bayezid's second eldest son, after Şehzade Abdullah, who died in 1483. In Ottoman tradition, all princes (Turkish: şehzade) were required to serve as provincial (sanjak) governors in Anatolia as part of their training. Ahmed was appointed the governor of Amasya, an important Anatolian city. Although the status was not official, he was usually considered the crown prince during the last years of his father's reign, in part because of the support of the grand vizier, Hadim Ali Pasha.

He became known as a poet and scholar, as well as a patron of the arts; his circle included, among others, the poet Mihri Hatun.

== Siblings ==
Ahmed had two living half-brothers. Of the two, Korkut was governing in Antalya and Selim (future sultan Selim I, known as Yavuz) in Trabzon. Custom dictated that whoever first reached Istanbul after the death of the previous sultan had the right to ascend to the throne (although disagreements over who had arrived first very often led to civil wars between the brothers, most prominently displayed in the Ottoman Interregnum), so the distances from the sanjaks to Istanbul more or less determined the succession and usually whoever the previous sultan favored the most as his successor. In this respect, Ahmed was the most fortunate because his sanjak was the closest to Istanbul.

Although Selim's son Süleyman (future Suleiman the Magnificent) had been assigned to Bolu, a small sanjak closer to Istanbul, upon Ahmed's objection, he was relocated to Kaffa in Crimea. Selim saw this as an unofficial display of support for his elder brother and asked for a sanjak in Rumeli (the European portion of the empire). Although he was initially refused on the ground that Rumeli sanjaks were not offered to princes, with the support of the vassal Crimean khan Meñli I Giray, he was able to receive the sanjak of Semendire (modern Smederevo in Serbia), which, although it was technically in Rumeli, was quite far from Istanbul. Consequently, Selim chose to stay close to Istanbul instead of going to his new sanjak. His father Beyazıt thought this disobedience insurrectionist; he defeated Selim's forces in battle in August 1511, and Selim escaped to Crimea.

== Şahkulu rebellion ==
While Beyazıt was fighting against Selim, Ahmed was tasked with suppressing the Şahkulu Rebellion in Anatolia. However, instead of fighting, Ahmed tried to win over the soldiers to his cause for winning the Ottoman throne and left the battlefield. His attitude caused unease among the soldiers; more importantly, his main supporter, Hadim Ali Pasha, lost his life during the rebellion.

== Capturing Konya ==
Hearing about Selim's defeat at the hands of their father, Ahmed declared himself as the sultan of Anatolia and began fighting against one of his nephews (whose father had already died). He captured Konya, and although his father Beyazıt asked him to return to his sanjak, he insisted on ruling in Konya. He also attempted to capture the capital; but he failed because the soldiers blocked his way, declaring their preference for a more able sultan. Selim then returned from Crimea, forced Bayazit to abdicate the throne in his favor, and was crowned as Selim I.

== Defeat and death ==
Ahmed continued to control a part of Anatolia in the first few months of Selim's reign. Finally, the forces of Selim and Ahmed fought a battle near Yenişehir, Bursa, on 24 April 1513. Ahmed's forces were defeated; he was arrested and executed shortly after.

== Family ==
=== Consorts ===
Ahmed had at least seven consorts. Four of them are known:

- Sittişah Hatun, mother of Şehzade Osman;
- Gülçiçek Hatun (buried in Amasya)
- Bülbül Hatun
- Feraşad Hatun

=== Sons ===
Ahmed had at least seven sons:

- Şehzade Süleyman (died of Plague, 24 April 1513, Cairo, buried in Havşi Sultan Mosque), governor of Koca, and Çorum 1509 – 1513, he had two daughters; one of them was:
  - Hundihan Sultan;
- Şehzade Alaeddin (died of Plague, 14 May 1513, Cairo, buried in Havşi Sultan Mosque), governor of Bolu 1509 – 1513, married his cousin Neslişah Hanımsultan, the daughter of his aunt Aynışah Sultan, and Ahmed Beg, and they had one daughter:
  - Hvandi Sultan, married to Sunullah Bey, governor of Kastamonu;
- Şehzade Osman (killed by Selim I, 14 April 1513, Amasya, buried in Sultan Bayezid Mosque, Amasya) - with Sittişah Hatun, governor of Osmancık 1509 – 1513;
- Şehzade Murad (1495 - c. 1519, died of natural causes, Ardabil, buried near Shaykh Safi al-Din Ardabili), governor of Bolu. He had two sons and one daughter:
  - Şehzade Mustafa (killed by Selim I, 14 May 1513, Amasya);
  - Şehzade Mehmed (killed by Selim I, September–October 1512, Amasya);
  - Asitanşah Sultan;
- Şehzade Ali (1499 - 1513, killed by Selim I)
- Şehzade Mehmed (1500 - 1513, killed by Selim I)
- Şehzade Kasım (c. 1501 – killed by Selim I, 30 January 1518, Cairo, buried in Havşi Sultan Mosque)

=== Daughters ===
Ahmed had at least four daughters:

- Kamerşah Sultan, known also as Kamer Sultan. She married in 1508 to Damad Mustafa Bey, governor of Midilli, and son of Iskender Pasha. They had at least one child, a daughter. Buried with her father;
- Fatma Sultan, married, in 1508 to Sultanzade Mehmed Bey, Ser-ulufeciyan (head of the Janissary Cavalry Corps), son of Damad Koca Davud Pasha and of an unnamed Ahmed's half-sister. She became widow in 1511 and in 1512 she chose to follow her full-brother Murad into exile in Persia, where she joined the harem of Ismail I;
- Fahrihan Sultan, married, in 1508 to Damad Suleiman Bey, Silahdar (keeper of the sword);
- Hanzade Sultan, married in 1516 to Damad Ahmed Bey;

== In popular culture ==
A fictionalized version of Ahmed is featured in the video game Assassin's Creed: Revelations as one of the two contenders for the throne (alongside Selim I) during the Ottoman Civil War, and a secret member of the Templar Order. Having joined the Order due to his dissatisfaction with the state of his family, Ahmed hoped to use the Templars' resources to win the war against his brother and restore peace to the Ottoman Empire. The game portrays Ahmed as a calm and calculated strategist, unlike the more impulsive Selim, and he is shown to get along well with his nephew, Suleiman (Selim's son). After becoming Grand Master of the Byzantine Rite of Templars, which aimed to restore the Byzantine Empire, Ahmed shifted the rite's goal to excavating a library in Masyaf, which he believed to contain the power to end all "pointless feuds". He clashes with the game's protagonist, Ezio Auditore da Firenze, who also seeks to open the library, and in the final confrontation of the game, he is defeated by Ezio outside Constantinople before being killed by Selim, who recently became Sultan.
