= Şehzade Abdullah (son of Bayezid II) =

Ottoman prince, son of Bayezid II and Şirin Hatun

- Born: c. 1465; Amasya, Ottoman Empire
- Died: 6 November 1483 (aged 17–18); Konya, Ottoman Empire
- Burial: Muradiye Complex, Bursa
- Spouse: Nergisşah Ferahşad Sultan (m. 1480)
- Issue: Şehzade Fülan; Aynışah Sultan; Şahnisa Sultan
- Dynasty: Ottoman
- Father: Bayezid II
- Mother: Şirin Hatun
- Religion: Sunni Islam

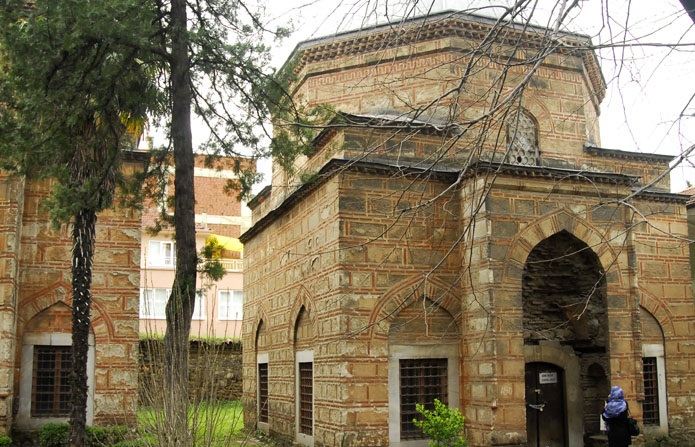
Exterior view of the mausoleum of Şirin Hatun

Şehzade Abdullah (Ottoman Turkish: شهزاده عبدالله; c. 1465 – 6 November 1483) was an Ottoman prince, son of Sultan Bayezid II and his concubine Şirin Hatun.

== Early life ==
Şehzade Abdullah was born in 1465 in Amasya. His father was Şehzade Bayezid (later Bayezid II), and his mother was Şirin Hatun, a slave concubine. She was one of the slaves of Christian origin, who came to the Ottoman Imperial harem via the Ottoman slave trade, and converted to Islam and was given a slave name after her arrival. He was the younger full-brother of Aynışah Sultan. He was the oldest son of his father and for this his mother took the title of BaşKadın. Abdullah was well-educated and his tutors were Tacüddin Ibrahim Bey, Karagöz Pasha and Hadım Sinan Pasha.

== Governorships ==
According to Turkish tradition, all princes were expected to work as provincial governors as a part of their training. In 1467, he was sent to Manisa as a governor alongside his mother Şirin and his sister. In 1472, he was summoned back to Istanbul and on 17 July 1472 he was circumcised alongside Şehzade Cem, the son of his grandfather Mehmed II and Çiçek Hatun, thus Bayezid's half-brother and Abdullah's half-uncle. Following his circumcision, he was transferred to Trabzon as a governor. He served in Trabzon as a governor for four years until 1476. He was the reassigned to Manisa, where he served until 1481.

In 1481, after the death of his grandfather Mehmed, a fight for the throne began between his father Bayezid and Şehzade Cem. Abdullah played a major role in the battle fought near Yenişehir between the two brothers. On 20 June 1481, Cem and his supporters were defeated and Bayezid became the sultan, and Cem and his family fled to Cairo, then under the Mamluk Sultanate. In July 1481, Abdullah was assigned the province of Konya after it was left vacant following Şehzade Cem's defeat.

The main reason of Abdullah's assignment in Konya was to diminish the threat of the return of Şehzade Cem and also the Karamanids. Gedik Ahmed Pasha, former grand vizier and Admiral of the Fleet came to Konya for Abdullah's protection. Kasım Bey, who was from the Karamanids marched on Konya, Hadım Ali Pasha, the governor of Karaman met with Kasım Bey, but due to the Karamanids being twice as large, they were defeated and Şehzade Abdullah and Ali Pasha were besieged in the Konya Castle. Gedik Ahmed Pasha was informed and he managed to free Abdullah and sent Ali Pasha to Mut Castle. The protection of Şehzade Abdullah became the main objective and due to his protection, Bayezid had ordered Ahmed Pasha and Ali Pasha to bring them to Afyonkarahisar, the prince later returned to Konya after Kasım Bey left the city.

The next year, Şehzade Cem gathered loyal men from Cairo and elsewhere and planned to invade Konya. Şehzade Abdullah and Gedik Ahmed Pasha had a clash with Cem's forces led by Mehmed Bey, occurred at Çukurçimen plateau in Konya, moreover they were also joined by the forces of Kasım Bey. However, when the forces of Cem marched towards Ankara, they were defeated by Hadım Ali Pasha and due to this defeat Cem sailed to Rhodes on 29 July 1482. Abdullah was supported by both the commanders and his father during this entire ordeal.

During his governorships in various provinces, he had abolished taxes, allocated and gave rights to foundations and also established a religious lodge in his name.

== Personal life ==
In 1480, Abdullah married Nergisşah (or Nergiszade) Ferahşad Sultan was the daughter of Şehzade Mustafa, the son of Mehmed II and Gülşah Hatun and Bayezid's half-brother. They had a son, Şehzade Fülan born in 1481, two daughters Aynışah born in 1482, and Şahnisa born in 1484, born posthumously after her father's death.

== Death ==
Abdullah died on 6 November 1483 at the age of eighteen in Konya due to his chronic illness. It was said that he was poisoned but he died of natural causes. His body was taken to Bursa and was buried in the Muradiye Complex in the tomb of Şehzade Mustafa. After his death, his younger half-brother Şehzade Şehinşah became the governor of Konya. His mother retired to Bursa. In retirement, she built a tomb for him, in which she and her daughter Aynışah were buried upon their death.

== Issue ==
Together with Nergisşah Ferahşad, Abdullah had a son and two daughters:

- Şehzade Fülan (c. 1481 – c. 1489)
- Aynışah Sultan (c. 1482 – c. 1540), she married Ahmed Pasha. Buried in Şirin Hatun's mausoleum.
- Şahnisa Sultan (c. 1484, born posthumously – c. 1540), she married firstly her cousin Şehzade Mehmed Şah (died in 1512, son of Şehzade Şehinşah, son of Bayezid II); secondly Mirza Mehmed Pasha (died in 1517), Who was previously married with her aunt Fatma Sultan (daughter of Bayezid II)); and had a son, Sultanzade Şemsi Ahmed Pasha; eventually she married Nuri Bey.

== Sources ==
- Şafakcı, Hamit (2024). II. Bayezid'in oğlu Şehzade Abdullah'in ailesi ve sancakbeyligi. DergiPark.
