= Yenişehir =

Yenişehir or Yeni Şehir (Turkish for "new city" or "new town"), also spelt as Yeni Shehr may refer to:

== Settlements ==
- Yenişehir, the modern section of Ankara, Turkey
- Yenişehir, Bursa, a district of Bursa Province, Turkey
- Yenişehir, Diyarbakır, a district of the city of Diyarbakır, Diyarbakır Province, Turkey
- Yenişehir, Mersin, a district of Mersin Province, Turkey
- Yenişehir, Nicosia, a suburb of Nicosia, in Northern Cyprus
- Yenişehir, Pendik, a neighborhood of Istanbul, Turkey
- Yenişehir-i Fener, the Ottoman name of the city of Larissa, Greece
- Yenişehir, a former name of Karacasu, a district of Aydın Province, Turkey

== Structures ==
- Yenişehir Airport, an airport in Yenişehir district of Bursa Province, Turkey
- Yenişehir railway station, a TCDD station in Ankara, Turkey
- Yenişehir Stadium, a multi-purpose stadium in Karabük, Turkey
- GSIM Yenişehir Ice Hockey Hall, a venue in Erzurum, Turkey

== See also ==
- Nevşehir, with an equivalent etymology in Turkish language
