= Ottoman Civil War (1509–1513) =

Military conflict

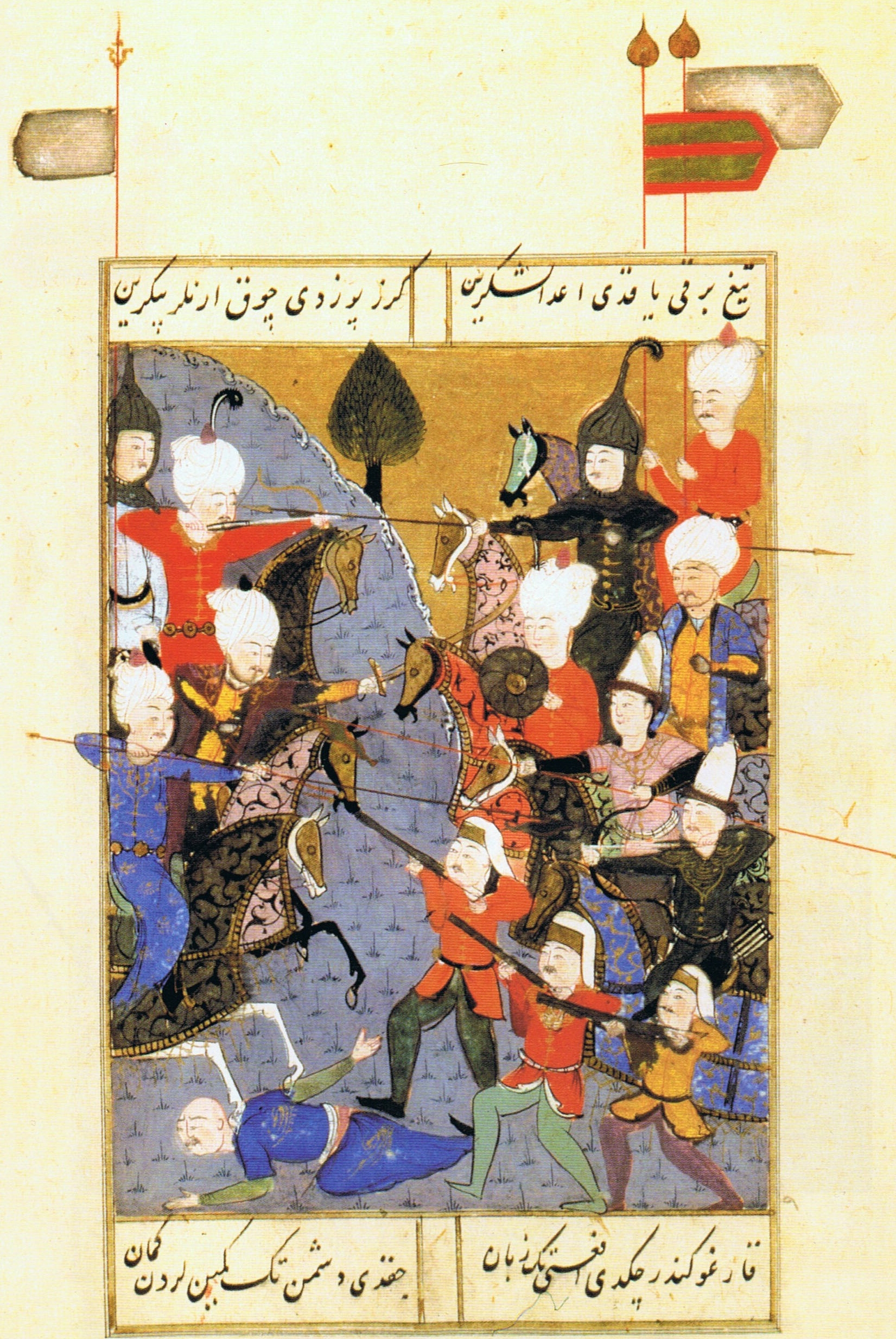
- The Battle of Yenişehir in 1513, the last battle of the civil war
Date	1509 – 1513
Location	Ottoman Empire
Result	Victory for Selim: Bayezid abdicated in favor of Selim under pressure from his rebellious son and the Janissaries; Executions of Şehzade Ahmed and Şehzade Korkut in 1513; Selim becomes the Şehzade.

Belligerents
Army of Selim I Janissaries; Supported by: Crimean Khanate	Army of Bayezid II (until his abdication); Army of Şehzade Ahmed; Supported by: Safavid Iran	Army of Şehzade Korkut

Commanders and leaders
Selim I Bıyıklı Mehmed Pasha; Hersekzade Ahmed Pasha	Bayezid II (surrendered) # Şehzade Ahmed (executed); Şehzade Murad; Hadım Ali Pasha †	Şehzade Korkut (executed)

Strength
10,000–20,000 (Together with the Janissaries)	Army of Bayezid II: 40,000 (until his abdication); Army of Şehzade Ahmed: 15,000–30,000	3,000–8,000

The Ottoman Civil War was a war of succession in the Ottoman Empire from 1509 to 1513, during the reign of Bayezid II, between his sons Ahmed, Selim, and Korkut.

In 1509, Ahmed, the oldest claimant, won a battle against the Karaman Turks and their Safavid allies in Asia Minor and marched on Istanbul to exploit his triumph. Fearing for his safety, Selim staged a revolt in Thrace but was defeated by Bayezid and forced to flee to Crimea in 1511.

Bayezid developed fears that Ahmed might then kill him to gain the throne, and refused to allow his son to enter Constantinople. However, some sources suggest that the Janissaries acted on their own in preventing Ahmed from entering the city due to their loyalty to Selim.

Selim returned from Crimea and, with support from the Janissaries, forced Bayezid to abdicate on 25 April 1512. Bayezid later died on his way to Demotika, only a month after his abdication, but fighting for the throne continued between the newly-crowned Sultan Selim I and Ahmed. After a series of civil disobediences, Ahmed was defeated and killed at the Battle of Yenişehir in April 1513. With Korkut having been executed shortly before, as Selim feared he might instigate a revolt against him, the civil war ended with Selim as the undisputed victor.

== Popular culture ==
The conflict is dramatized in the alternate history video game Assassin's Creed Revelations (2011), in which it is one of the focal plotlines.

== See also ==
- Şahkulu Rebellion

== Sources ==
- Finkel, Caroline, Osman's Dream, Basic Books, 2005.
