= Kurdish emirates =

Various entities in the Middle East, 1500s–1800s

The Kurdish emirates, Kurdish chiefdoms or Kurdish principalities (Sorani Kurdish: میرنشینە کوردییەکان) were various semi-independent entities which existed during the 16th to 19th centuries during the state of continuous warfare between the Ottoman Empire and Safavid Iran. The Kurdish principalities were almost always divided and entered into rivalries against each other. The demarcation of borders between the Safavid Shah Safi and the Ottoman caliph Sultan Murad IV in 1639 effectively divided Kurdistan between the two empires.

The eyalet of Diyarbakir was the center of the major and minor Kurdish chiefdoms. However, other Kurdish emirates existed outside of Diyarbakir.

== Policy during the Ottoman-Persian Wars ==
The Ottomans gave the Kurds self-rule during the Ottoman-Persian wars, to ensure that the Kurds remain on the Ottoman side. After the Treaty of Erzurum in 1823 the Persian threat was reduced & the Ottomans brought the Kurdish chiefdoms under direct control.

== List ==
=== Major emirates ===
- Ardalan
- Bahdinan
- Baban
- Bitlis
- Bohtan
- Bradost
- Donboli
- Eğil
- Genç
- Hakkari
- Emirate of Hasankeyf
- Principality of Hizan
- Kilis
- Mahmudi Principality
- Mukriyan
- Palu
- Pazooka
- Soran
- Principality of Suleyman
- Tercil
- Daseni
- Shekak
- Milan (tribe)
- Koçgiri

=== Minor emirates ===
- Abagay (Ezdikhan)
- Ağcakale
- Aghakis (Göllü, Tatvan District)
- Albak
- Arabgir
- Awraman
- Principality of Atak
- Bâne
- Bayezid
- Bargiri
- Belican
- Çaan Gedig
- Çeğni
- Çemişgezek
- Çermik
- Daratang
- Darna
- Dasini
- Derzini
- Diyadin
- Dulkıran
- Eruh
- Goran
- Görgil
- Principality of Gürdükan
- Hançük
- Hemkerdan
- Emirate of Hezo
- Hûdî (Didan Tribe)
- Ispayird (Sürücüler, Hizan District)
- İspir
- Janpollat
- Kârkâr (Daldere, Gevaş district)
- Kızuçan
- Kurnê
- Kiğı
- Lesser Lur (Lur-i Kuchek)
- Mahidasht
- Mazgirt
- Mifariqın
- Mihrani (Mihrani Kalesi in Hazro District)
- Mücenkürd
- Principality of Müks
- Pasin
- Pertek
- Palangan
- Pünyanişi (Somay)
- Qulp
- Sağman
- Sasun
- Siirt
- Sindi
- Siyah Mansûr
- Somay
- Suveydi (Çapakçur)
- Şemdinan (Istuni, Sitûnê village, Mergasor District)
- Şirvan (Kufra)
- Şıtak
- Terza
- Uşni
- Zakho
- Zangana
- Zeriki (Sarıca, Şemdinli District)
- Zerza (Zerzan tribe)
- Zirqan (Zeyrek)

== See also ==
- Vassal and tributary states of the Ottoman Empire
- List of Kurdish dynasties and countries
- Ayyubids
- Shaddadids
- Islamic Emirate of Kurdistan
