= Ocaklık =

Hereditary estate in the Ottoman Empire

Ocaklık, also known as yurdluk, was a hereditary estate granted to local nobility in the Ottoman Empire for military service. Ocaklıks were a prevalent form of governance within the Ottoman lands, belonging to eyalets including but not limited to Baghdad, Damascus, Raqqa, Bosnia, and Anatolia. Ocaklıks greatly overlapped with the more autonomous hükümet, but ocaklıks were differently subject to tahrir (cadastre) and timar.

== List ==
List of Ocaklıks between 1673–1740:

- Zaçesne (Cernik)
- Çermik
- Pertek
- Kulb - Ruled by the Principality of Suleyman.
- Ağca Kale
- Dasini - Ruled by the Sheikhan principality.
- Mihrani
- Pasin
- Hınıs
- Malazgird
- Micingerd
- Kuzcan
- Kiğı
- Bayezid Kalesi
- Eleşkird
- Köy
- Şelve (Tutak-Hamur)
- Diyadin
- Oltı
- Ardanuc
- Şavşad
- Pertekrek
- Nısf-ı Livâne (Artvin)
- Mahcil
- Acere-ı Ülyâ (Upper Adjara) - Ruled by the Khimshiashvili Family.
- Acere-ı Süflâ (Lower Adjara)
- Emir Hoy
- Astere
- Posthov
- Hartus
- Altun Kale
- Astıha
- Mamervan
- Ahalkelek
- Geçvan
- Ardahan-ı Küçük
- Batum
- Bitlis - Also a hükümet. Ruled by the Rojaki Dynasty.
- Hizan - Also a hükümet
- Hakkâri - Also a hükümet. Ruled by the Hakkâri dynasty.
- Hoşab (Mahmûdî) - Also a hükümet. Ruled by the Mahmudi Principality
- Kârkâr
- Zeriki
- Şırvî - Ruled by the Şirvan mirs
- Şıtak
- Espayrid
- Bargiri
- Diyadin
- Somay - Ruled by the Pinyanişi principality.
- Belican
- Abagay - Ruled by the Ezdikhan Principality.
- İmadiyye - Also a hükümet. Ruled by the Bahdinan mirs.
- Cessân Bedre
- Herîr (Şehrân) - Also a hükümet. Ruled by the Soran mirs.
- Mîr-Aşiret-i Baclan (Zohab)
- Derne ve Dertenk
- Mendelcin
- Mendemi Aşireti
- Hûdî
- Zengene
- Ça'an Gediği
- Dulkıran
- Vatan (in Tunis)

Other Sanjaks that were Ocaklık in 1631–1632:

- Sağman
- Mazgird
- Atak
- Çapakçur
- Siirt
- Görgil
- Ahakis
- Meyyafarikin
- Hemkerdekân
- Müküs
- Albak
- Kotur
- Bolu
- Gaza - Ruled by the Ridwan dynasty
- Lajjun - Ruled by the Turabay dynasty
- Deyr-i Rahhe - Ruled by the Al Abu Risha
- Hâbûr
- Cemâse
- Beni Rabî'a
- Anah - Ruled by the Al Abu Risha

== Bibliography ==
- Özok-Gündoğan, Nilay (2022). The Kurdish Nobility in the Ottoman Empire: Loyalty, Autonomy and Privilege. Edinburgh Studies on the Ottoman Empire. Edinburgh: Edinburgh University Press. ISBN 9781399508612.
