= Vassal and tributary states of the Ottoman Empire =

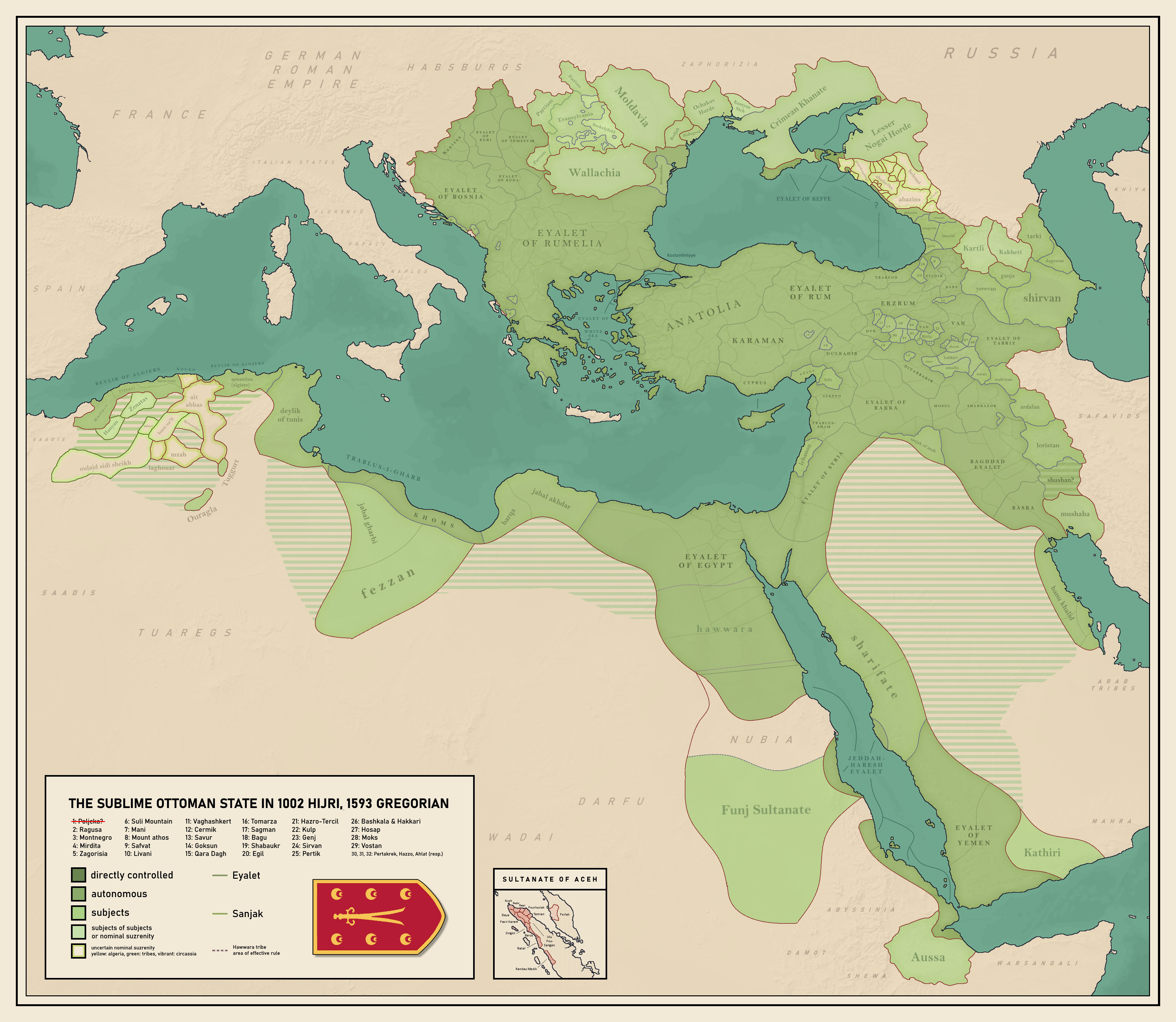
The Ottoman Empire and its vassals in its peak during the late 16th century during the reign of Murad III

The Ottoman Empire had a number of tributary and vassal states throughout its history. Its tributary states would regularly send tribute to the Ottoman Empire, which was understood by both states as also being a token of submission. In exchange for certain privileges, its vassal states were obligated to render support to the Ottoman Empire when called upon to do so. Some of its vassal states were also tributary states.

These client states, many of which could be described by modern terms such as satellite states or puppet states, were usually on the periphery of the Ottoman Empire under suzerainty of the Sublime Porte, over which direct control was not established. The Ottoman Empire maintained relationships with various states, some of which were under their direct rule (provinces) and others that were vassal states or tributary states, meaning they recognized Ottoman suzerainty but retained a degree of autonomy.

== Functions ==
Ottomans first demanded only a small yearly tribute from vassal princes, as a token of their submission. They later demanded that a vassal prince's son should be held as hostage, that the prince should come to the Palace once a year and swear allegiance, and that he should send auxiliary troops on the sultan's campaigns. Vassal princes were required to treat the sultan's friends and enemies as their own. If the vassal failed in these duties, his lands would be declared as darülharb (lit. territory of war) open to the raids of the Ghazis. The Ottomans considered as their vassals all states whose rulers agreed to pay tribute. Even the Habsburgs fell into this category after Ferdinand I (1526–64) agreed to buy peace from the Ottomans in 1533. In fact, the Habsburgs were tributary in name only, as was Ragusa. Transylvania depended much more on the goodwill of the Ottomans than did those ruling in either Vienna or Ragusa, and the so-called Danubian Principalities, (Moldavia and Wallachia) were indeed vassal states in the strictest legal sense of the term. The territories the Ottomans had conquered were either administered as provinces or transformed into vassal states, such examples as Fezzan, which was an independent state conquered and turned into a vassal state. The Ottomans established a pattern of government within their own territories or principalities that were incorporated gradually through tribute and military alliance before their full annexation. The Ottomans would give local dynasty that would recognize themselves as vassals, particularly in border zones, this policy allowed local ruler to have local authority exchange for tribute such as military support and coinage, public rituals such as naming the sultan in khutba, while recognize the ottomans as head ruler, and serve as buffer zones.

== Forms ==
- Some states within the eyalet system included sancakbeys who were local to their sanjak or who inherited their position (e.g., Samtskhe, some Kurdish sanjaks), areas that were permitted to elect their own leaders (e.g., areas of Albania, Epirus, and Morea (Mani Peninsula) was nominally a part of Aegean Islands Province but Maniot beys were tributary vassals of the Porte, or de facto independent eyalets (e.g., the Barbaresque 'regencies' Algiers, Tunisia, Tripolitania in the Maghreb, and later the Khedivate of Egypt). Egypt specifically had a unique case, Muhammad Ali Pasha became its Ottoman Governor but transformed himself to be its de facto ruler. He went to war with the Ottoman Sultan twice and established a dynasty that would rule Egypt until the revolution of 1952, even after the Ottoman sovereignty ended in 1914.
- Outside the eyalet system were states such as Moldavia, Wallachia and Transylvania which paid tribute to the Ottomans and over which the Porte had the right to nominate or depose the ruler, garrison rights, and foreign policy control. They were considered by the Ottomans as part of Dar al-'Ahd, thus they were allowed to preserve their self-rule, and were not under Islamic law, like the empire proper; Ottoman subjects, or Muslims for that matter, were not allowed to settle the land permanently or to build mosques.
- Territories Subject to the Caliphate. The Muslims of India (Pakistan, India, and Bangladesh), Sri Lanka, the Maldives, Afghanistan, Singapore, Malaysia, Indonesia, Brunei, Comoros, Kenya, Tanzania, Mozambique, the South of Africa, the western Turkestan Khanates (the Khanates of Khiva, Bukhara, and Kokand), and eastern Turkestan. Zanzibar sultanate
- Some states, such as Ragusa, paid tribute for the entirety of their territory and recognized Ottoman suzerainty.
- Others, such as the Sharif of Mecca, recognized Ottoman suzerainty but were subsidized by the Porte. The Ottomans were also expected to protect the Sharifate militarily – as suzerains over Mecca and Medina, the Ottoman sultans were meant to ensure the protection of the Hajj and Umrah pilgrimages and safe passage of pilgrims. The Amir al-hajj was a military officer appointed by the Sultanate to ensure this.
- During the nineteenth century, as Ottoman territory receded, several breakaway states from the Ottoman Empire had the status of vassal states (e.g. they paid tribute to the Ottoman Empire), before gaining complete independence. They were, however, de facto independent, including having their own foreign policy and their own independent military. This was the case with the principalities of Serbia, Romania and Bulgaria
- Some states paid tribute for possessions that were legally bound to the Ottoman Empire but not possessed by the Ottomans, such as the Habsburgs for parts of Royal Hungary or Venice for Zante.

There were also secondary vassals such as the Nogai Horde and the Circassians who were (at least nominally) vassals of the khans of Crimea, or some Berbers and Arabs who paid tribute to the North African beylerbeyis, who were in turn Ottoman vassals themselves. Other tribute from foreign powers included a kind of protection money, sometimes called a "horde tax" (similar to the Danegeld), paid by the Tsardom of Russia or the Polish-Lithuanian Commonwealth. It was usually paid to the Ottoman vassal khans of Crimea rather than to the Ottoman sultan directly.

== List of Ottoman tributaries and vassals ==
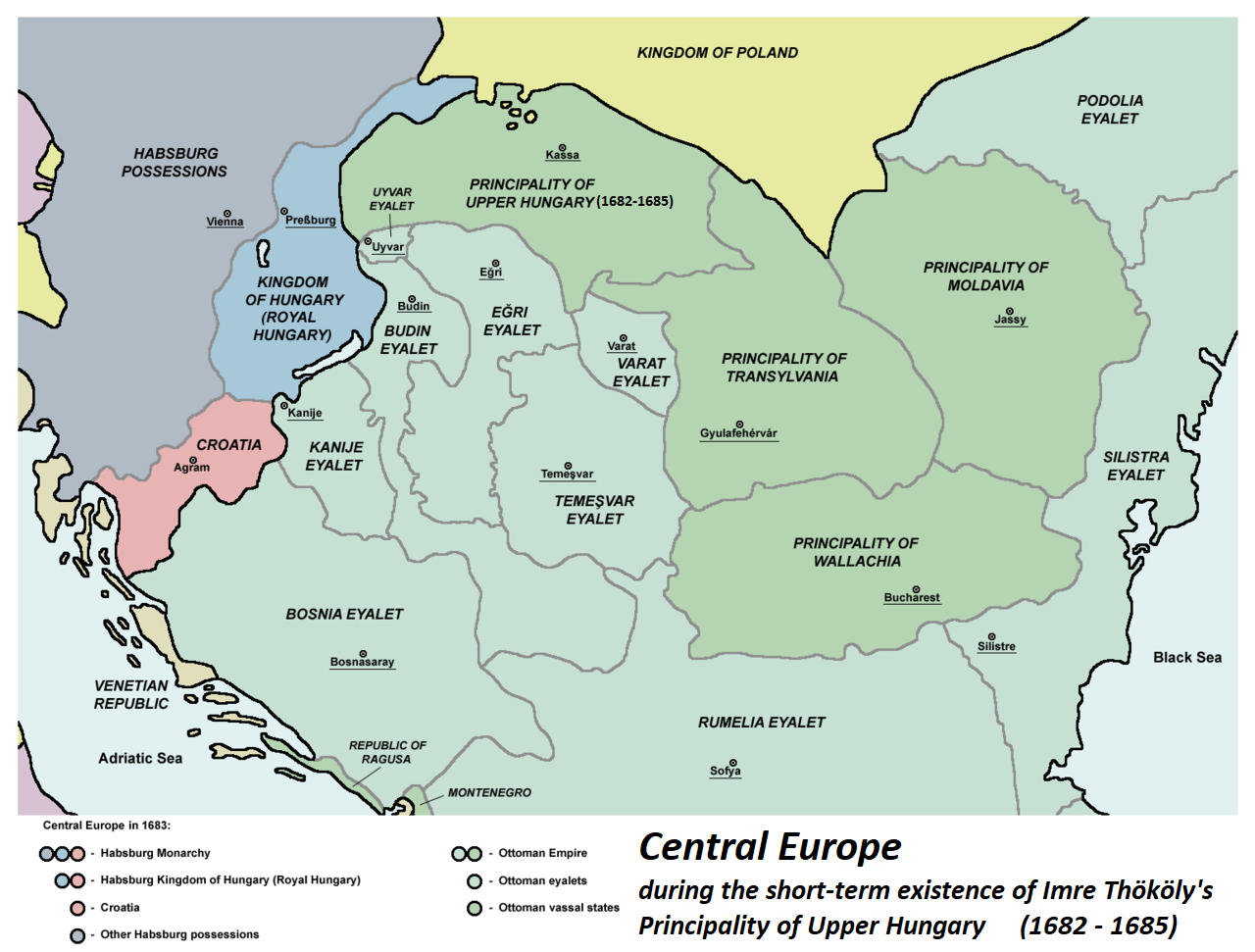
1683

- Byzantine Empire (1371 – 20 February 1403, 1424 – 6 April 1453)
  - Despotate of the Morea (1422–1470)
  - Empire of Trebizond (1456–1461)
- Lordship of Prilep (1371–1395)
- Dejanović noble family (1371–1395)
- Principality of Wallachia (Eflâk Prensliği), 1396–1397, 1417–1861 (with some interruptions, such as being annexed as an elayet from 1521-22 and 1595-96)
- Principality of Moravian Serbia (1389–1402)
- Despotate of Serbia (1402–1459)
- Second Bulgarian Empire (14th century)
- Principality of Moldavia (Boğdan Prensliği), 1456–1457, 1503–1861 with some interruptions.
- Duchy of Saint Sava (1470–1482)
- Republic of Ragusa (1458–1684/1699) 1707–1806/1808)
- Republic of Venice (1475–1603)
- Republic of Poljica (16th century?)
- Holy Roman Empire (1533–1540–1606), tributary state
  - Archduchy of Austria (1547–1604, 1664)
  - Kingdom of Bohemia, briefly in 1620 under Frederick I of Bohemia
- Duchy of Syrmia(1527–1530)
- Crimean Khanate (Kırım Hanlığı), 1478–1774
  - Grand Principality of Moscow 1521 during the Crimean invasion of Russia
  - Polish–Lithuanian Commonwealth (1503–16th century): paid a Tributary to the khans
  - Budjak Horde (1697–1774–1812?)
  - Circassian principalities and societies(15th–1739)
  - Kabardia (?–1739)
  - Ochakov steppe or Yedisan (1684–1760s)
  - Jamboyluq Horde (also known as Perekop Horde)
  - Astrakhan Khanate (1523 and 1549)
  - Yedishkul Horde
  - Lesser Nogai Horde
  - the Dobrud Horde
  - Tsardom of Russia (1511–1547–1594–1689) The Crimean khanate had done over several raids, while the Russians did agree to pay them tribute occasionally. Technically (but not de facto), Russia was a tributary of the Crimean khanate as the remaining successor of the Golden Horde, which was hard to defeat until about the 17th century
- Prince-Bishopric of Montenegro (1516–1697)
- Former Golden Horde Khanates
  - Kazan Khanate (1521–1531, 1533–1546, 1546–1551)Safa Giray ruled Kazan for 23 years as the Ottoman representative While Sahib I Giray Who was enthroned as Khan. declared himself an Ottoman vassal in 1521–1524
  - Budjak Horde (1620–1697–1812?)
  - Kasim Khanate (1486–1512)
  - Lesser Nogai Khanate (1548–1711)
  - Bashkir Khanate (1656–1738) came under Ottoman protection.
- Ghat and Kawar (1850–1910) They requested Ottoman administration over their territories. but without being incorporated into the Ottoman Empire. thus Ottomans developed a special strategy or an indirect administration for them.
- Tibesti, Wadai sultanate, Tevarıks and Tîbûs.(18th–1911) in the 1880s when French colonialism began to spread in the region of the lake chad, Tîbûs and Tevarıks sent representatives to the Ottoman State’s Trablusgarp province and his leaders personally Demanded protection of the Ottomans against the enemy. They came under Ottoman protection but was hard to maintain due to its distance
- Emirate of Mount Lebanon (1516–1842)
  - Ma'n dynasty (1516–1697)
  - Chehab dynasty (1697–1842)
- Arabian tribes under Ottoman rule
  - Sharifate of Mecca (1517–1803)
  - Al Fadl, Mawali, Hassana, Ruwalla, Ageidet, Fedaan, and Sbaa (1516–18th century)
  - Hutaym (1553?–19th century)
  - annah (1522–18th)
  - Dulaim (?–19th century)
  - Mozabite tribe or Banu Mzab (1500s–18th century)
  - Latakia considered themselves vassals of the porte
  - Turabay dynasty (1517–1677)
  - Emirate of Asir
  - Emirate of Jabal Shammar (1836–1921)
  - First Saudi state and the Second Saudi state (1818–1918)
  - Principality of Najran (1638–1924 )
  - Emirate of Dhala he was required by the Turkish authorities to make his submission to the Porte
  - Zaydi Imams in the 19th century, Yemen was a nominal part of the Ottoman Empire (19th–1922?)
  - the emirates of Oman, Qatar, and Bahrain (1535–1913)
  - Mu'ammarid Imamate (1818–1820)
  - Assaf dynasty (1517–1591)
  - Hadhramaut (1538–20th)
- Regency of Algiers (1516–1830)
  - Kingdom of Tlemcen (1551–1556)
  - Beylik of Constantine )1830–1837)
  - Sultanate of Tuggurt or tuoggourt (1552–1830)
  - Sultanate of Wargla (1552–1830)
  - Makhzen tribes
  - Dhouaouda (1541–1638) Dhouaouda signed the Pact of Barbarossa with the Ottomans and the emir of Biskra, Ali bin Sakhri pledged allegiance to the Ottoman Empire
- Ottoman Tripolitania
  - Tuareg Confederations (semi-vassal relations) Tuareg tribes in the central Sahara (e.g., Kel Ajjer, Kel Ahaggar) paid tribute or acknowledged Ottoman Tripoli's authority intermittently.
  - Sanjak of Benghazi (Bingazi Sancağı): autonomous sanjak. Formerly in the vilayet of Tripoli, but after 1875 dependent directly on the ministry of the interior at Constantinople
- Mamluk dynasty of Iraq (1704–1831)
- Ottoman Tunisia (1574–1881)
  - Djerid (1570s–1881)
  - Muradid dynasty (1613–1702)
  - Husainid dynasty (1705–1881)
- Awlad Muhammad (Fezzan) (1574–1812)
  - Riyyah tribe and Magarha
- Sennusia (De facto vassal)
- Cyrenaica (Ottoman vassal until 1517–1835, ottoman province until 1835–1913)
- Anatolian beyliks under Ottoman rule
  - Karamanids (1386–14th)
  - Germiyanids (1382–?)
  - Candar dynasty (1386–1402–1440–1461)
  - Beylik of Ramazan (1517–1608)
  - Beylik of Sarukhan (1390–1412)
  - Beylik of Dulkadir (1515–1522)
- Albanian tribes under Ottoman rule
  - Pashalik of Yanina (1787–1822)
  - Pashalik of Berat (1774–1809)
  - Pashalik of Scutari (1757–1831)
  - League of Prizren (1878–1881)
  - Souliotes Confederacy (16th century–1821)
  - Mirdita (1416–1912)
  - Kelmendi 13th?–1909?)
  - Triesh or Kuči (tribe)
- Mani Peninsula (1460–Until 1878?)
- Little Cumania Came under special protection by Sultan Mehmet III
- Zagorisian (1431–?)
- Tripolitania Karamanlis (1711–1835)
- Zaporozhian Sich De jure vassal (1711–1734)
- Danubian Sich (1775–1828)
- Laghouat (14th? –1727–1828)
- Ouargla (1555–1855)
- Shirvan (early 1724–1725)
- After the Treaty of Constantinople (1578–1606)
  - Dagestan
  - Khuzestan
  - Luristan
  - Shahrizor
  - Shirvan
  - Karabakh
  - Erivan province
- Shamkhalate of Tarki (1580s–1590s)
- Adal Sultanate Imam Ahmed agreed to formally recognize Ottoman suzerainty, pay 100,000 okkas of gold to the sultan, and send tribute worth another 2,000 okkas of gold annually to the Ottoman governor in Zebid, Mustafa al-Neshar. (1527–1577)
- Eastern Africa/ Kilwa Swahilli (Mogadishu down to Mombasa and south-eastern African coast from the Zambezi to Mozambique)(1567–late 1580 to early 1600)
  - Comoros Islands(briefly 1586-1590 part of the Swahili tribes)
  - Lamoli (1584)
  - Kilifi, Pate, Lamu and Faza recognize ottoman suzerainty
  - Malindi briefly seized the city (1595–1598)
  - Barawa (1585–1590) becomes Ottoman vassal
  - Zanzibar (16th century) (the island, briefly under Ottoman protection before the Portuguese regained control)
- Duchy of the Archipelago (1537, 1565–1579)
- Eastern Hungarian Kingdom (1526–1551, 1556–1570)
- Samtskhe-Saatabago (atabegate) (1500–1625)
- Kingdom of Imereti (1555–1804)
  - Principality of Svaneti (1555–1804)
  - Principality of Mingrelia (1557–1803)
  - Principality of Mingrelia (1568–1803)
  - Principality of Guria (1614–1810)
  - Principality of Abkhazia (1555–1810)
- Kingdom of Kartli (1578–1612, 1723–1736)
- Kingdom of Kakheti (1578–1612, 1723 –1736)
- Kanem–Bornu Empire (1577–1603) Borno was dependent nominally to the Ottoman Empire, as they were taken as an obedient vassal.
- Hilaalee dynasty of The Maldives (1565?–1737?–1900?) the Maldivian monarchs during the 15th–18th–20th functioned as a vassal state under the suzerainty of the Ottoman Empire.
- Principality of Transylvania (Erdel), 1570–1699 with some interruptions
  - Székely Land (1570?–1870)
  - Partium (1541–5 September 1619)
- Polish–Lithuanian Commonwealth (1577–1586, 1672–1676): briefly considered a vassal/tributary state under the Ottoman. (Note: The Ottoman Empire, by placing the Kingdom of Poland under its protection in July 30, 1577, from the Habsburgs actions. extended its influence/Suzerain into the lands of Belarus, northern Ukraine, Latvia, Lithuania, and Estonia, reaching as far as the Baltic Sea. After Henryk II Walezy of the French House of Valois fled to France to be crowned, Sokollu Mehmed Pasha intervened in the succession disputes in Poland and had Stephen Báthory, the voivode of Transylvania, which at the time was subject to the Ottoman Empire, elected as "King of Poland." This making Poland subjected to Murad III. Bathory now based his domestic and foreign policy on Ottomans. Ottoman influence weakened, and during the rule of Sigismund III Vasa, who came to the throne in 1586, it disappeared completely. But in September 16, 1591 The treaty of September, in the presence of Turgut Çavuş. agreed to pay the ottomans a tribute of 250.000. A year later Poland withdrew from the treaty. But had still lifted Ottoman influence over Poland. Ottoman influence persisted for many years Poland paid an annual tribute to the Ottomans after Treaty of Buchach)
  - Duchy of Prussia (1576–1586)
  - Duchy of Livonia (1576–1586)
  - Duchy of Courland and Semigallia (1576–1586, 1672–1676)
- Sultanate of Aceh, 1569–1903
  - Johor (1556—1582–1623)
  - Pahang (1617—1623?)
  - Kedah (1619—1630?)
  - Perak (1620—1629?)
  - Deli (1612—1636?)
  - Aru (1565—1636?)
  - Nias (1624—1636?)
  - Siak (1615—1636?)
  - Indragiri (1615—1636?)
  - Jambi (1615—1636?)
- Saadi sultanate(1576–1582 vassal 1582–1587 protection)
- Wattasid dynasty (1549–1549–1554)
- Five independent Assyrian tribes of Hakkâri (Tyari, Baz, Jilu, Tkhuma and Diz)
- Kurdish emirates (16th–19th centuries) peacefully vassalized after the Ottoman-Iraqi War, when Kurds were allowed their own state. Most Kurdish Emirates was in bad condition an agreed to become an Ottoman tributary.
  - Principality of Zirqan (1514–1835)
  - Principality of Suleyman (1514–1839)
  - Mukriyan (1583–1609?)
  - Ardalind dynasty (1578–1603, 1623–1639, 1723–1736?)
  - Mukriyan (under the Ardalind)
  - Baban (16th–1850)
  - Bohtan (1514–1855)
  - Principality of Eğil (?–1864)
  - Emirate of Hakkâri (?–1847) The allegiance of the Hakkâri rulers fluctuated between different overlords ( ottoman and safavid ) in subsequent years
  - Emirate of Kilis (1515–1610)
  - Principality of Mahmudi (1548–1604)
  - Emirate of Biradost (1510? Or 1534? –1603)
  - Emirate of Palu (1517–1839)
  - Emirate of Pazooka (1517-1587)
- Principality of Montenegro (Karadağ Prensliği), (1516–1696–1878)
- Cossack Hetmanate: Protectorate and Sanjak of the Ottoman Empire (1655–1663) and (June 1669 – 1685) The Ottomans continued to recognize some use for the Cossack vassal state and appointed lurii as Hatmanate.
- Zaporozhian Cossacks (1648-1652)
- Principality of Upper Hungary (modern-day Slovakia), 1682–1685 under Imre Thököly
- Sultanate of Darfur (1915–1916)
- Derebeys Feudal Lords (18th–19th century)
- Septinsular Republic (1800–1807)
- Mauritius Island they considered themselves Ottoman subjects (19th–20th?)
- Principality of Serbia (Sırbistan Prensliği) (1815–1878 de facto independence, 1867 de jure independence 1878) Russian Empire
- Al-Muntafiq (1530–1918)
- United Principalities of Romania (Romanya Prensliği) 1862–1877
- Yettishar (1865–1877)
  - Khanate of Kokand
- Khedivate of Egypt (Mısır) 1867–1914 de jure under Ottoman suzerainty, in effect fully autonomous, and from 1882 under British occupation; broke away from Ottoman suzerainty upon Ottoman entry into World War I on the side of the Central Powers and reformed as the "Sultanate of Egypt" which was declared a British protectorate on 5 November 1914, the day when Britain and France declared war against the Ottoman Empire. Britain also formally annexed Cyprus (under British administration since the Cyprus Convention in 1878, but nominally still an Ottoman territory) until 5 November 1914.
  - Ja'alin tribe (1820–1822)
  - Taqali Tribe (1821–1883?)
  - Mangbetu kingdoms (1859–1892)
  - Emirate of Harar (1782?–1875?, 1875–1887) was a subject state of the Khedivate of Egypt/Ottoman Empire
  - Equatoria (1872–1882)
- Kimr people (1874–1882)
- Principality of Bulgaria (Bulgaristan Prensliği) (1878–1908) de facto independent.
- Principality of Samos (Sisam) 1835–1912: established as an autonomous tributary principality under a Christian Prince; annexed to Greece during the First Balkan War
- Eastern Rumelia (Doğu Rumeli) (1878–1885) established by the Treaty of Berlin on 13 July 1878 as an autonomous province, in a personal union with the tributary Principality of Bulgaria on 6 September 1885 but remained de jure under Ottoman suzerainty; annexed by Bulgaria on 5 October 1908.
- Cyprus (Kıbrıs) (1878–1914) established British administration under Ottoman suzerainty with the Cyprus Convention of 4 June 1878; annexed by Britain on 5 November 1914, upon Ottoman entry into World War I.
- Condominium of Bosnia and Herzegovina established Austro-Hungarian administration under Ottoman suzerainty with the Treaty of Berlin of 13 July 1878; annexed by Austria-Hungary on 7 October 1908, upon the Young Turk Revolution.
- Qatar (Katar) (1872–1913)
- Cretan State (Girit) (1898–1912/13) established as an internationally supervised tributary state headed by a Christian governor; in 1908 the Cretan parliament unilaterally declared union with Greece; the island was occupied by Greece in 1912, and de jure annexed in 1913

== See also ==
- Administrative divisions of the Ottoman Empire
- Turkish historical chronology
- Ottoman wars in Africa
- Eyalets of the Ottoman Empire

== Sources ==
- Haji Mail, Haji Awang Asbol; Anwar, Zaidul (2016). "Sultan Muhammad Alam: Roles in Civil War". Jurnal Darussalam (in Malay). 16. Bandar Seri Begawan: Brunei History Centre, Ministry of Culture, Youth and Sports: 6–23.
