= List of Kurdish dynasties and countries =

This article is a list of Kurdish dynasties, countries, and autonomous territories. The Kurds are an Iranian people without their own nation state; they inhabit a geo-cultural region known as "Kurdistan", which lies in east Turkey, north Syria, north Iraq, and west Iran. (For more information see Origin of the Kurds.)

== 8th–19th century states ==
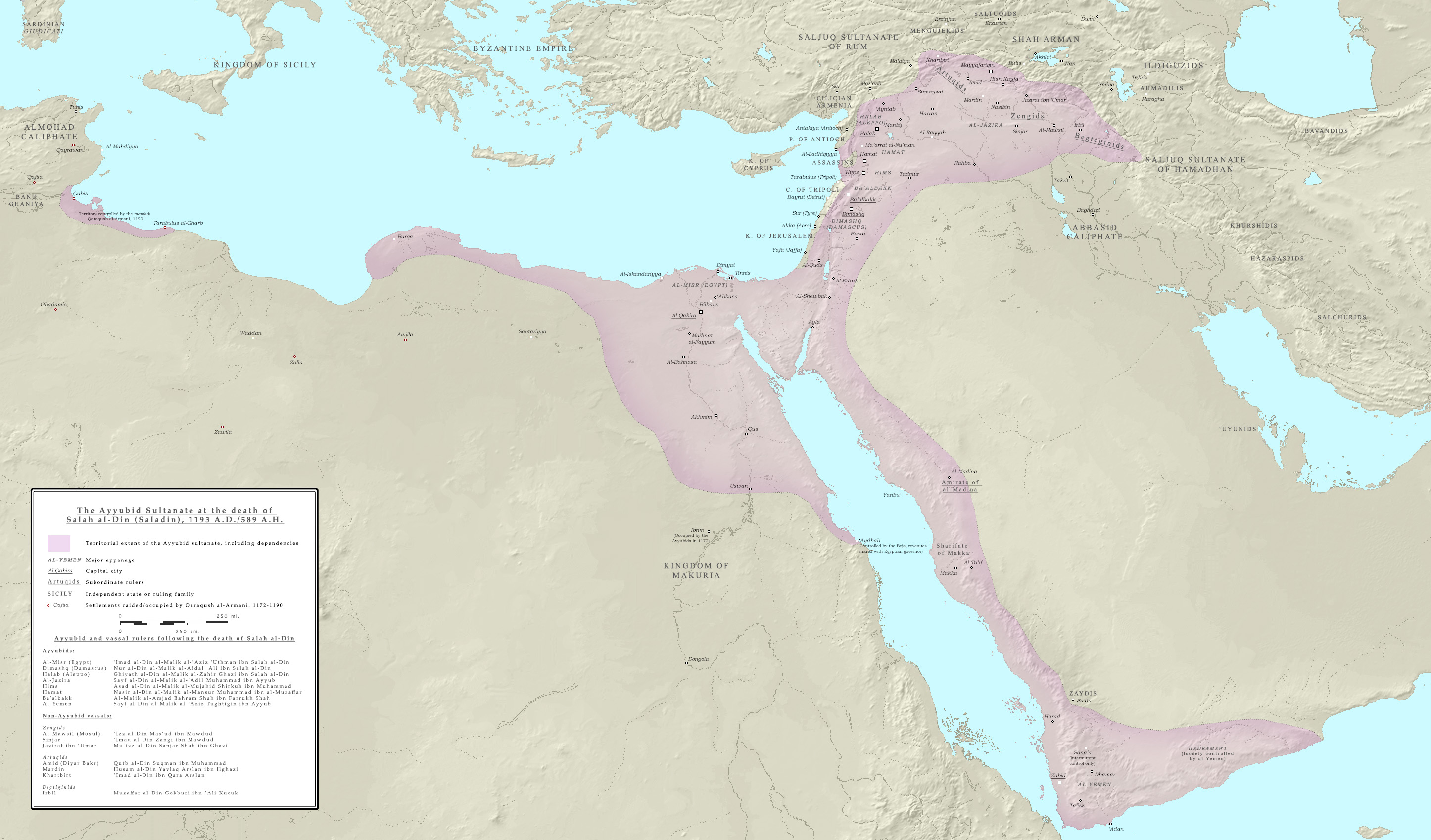
The Ayyubid dynasty in 1193.

=== Prior to the Ayyubid dynasty (until 1171) ===
- Hadhbanis (906–1144)
- Aishanids (912–961)
- Daysam's Adharbayjan (938–955)
- Shaddadids (951–1199)
- Rawwadids (955–1071)
- Hasanwayhids (959–1014)
- Marwanids (983–1096)
- Annazids (990/91–1117)
- Shabankara (11th century–12th century)
- Principality of Eğil (1049–1864)
- Atabegete of Greater Lorestan (1115–1425)
- Zakarids (1161–1360)
- Ayyubid dynasty (1171–1341)

=== After the Ayyubid dynasty (after 1171) ===
- Emirate of Kilis (1181/1183–1610)
- Principality of Bitlis (1187–1847)
- Emirate of Şirvan (?–1840s)
- Sheikhan principality (c. 13th century–present)
- Emirate of Çemişgezek (13th century–1663)
- Principality of Donboli (1210–1799)
- Emirate of Bingöl (1231–1864)
- Emirate of Hasankeyf (1232–1524)
- Mukriyan (14th century–19th century)
- Vassaldom of Ardalan (14th century–1865 or 1868)
- Principality of Zirqan (1335–1835)
- Emirate of Bahdinan (1339–1843)
- Emirate of Hakkâri (Before 1380s–1845)
- Principality of Suleyman (15th century–1838)
- Principality of Mahmudi (1406–1839)
- Zarrinnaal Dynasty (1448–1925)
- Emirate of Palu (1495–1845)
- Emirate of Pazooka (1499–1587)

=== 16th century onwards ===
- Baban (16th century–1850)
- Emirate of Bradost (1510–1609)
- Zafaranlu principality (1600-1922)
- Emirate of Bohtan (before 1514–1847)
- Emirate of Soran (before 1514–1836)
- Principality of Pinyaşi (1548–1823)
- Principality of Ezdikhan (1593-1836)
- Sarab Khanate (18th century)
- Zand dynasty (1750–1794) – The dynasty is of Kurdish Lak origin.
- Tabriz Khanate (1757–1799)
- Hasan Khan dynasty in Pish-e Kuh (1795–1820)
- Emirate of Miks (?–1846)

== 20th and 21st century states ==
- Kurdish State (1918–1919)
- Kingdom of Kurdistan (1921–1924 and 1925)
- Kurdistan Uezd (1923–1929)
- Republic of Ararat (1927–1931)
- Republic of Mahabad (1946–1947)
- Republic of Laçin (1992)
- Islamic Emirate of Kurdistan (1994–2003)
- Kurdish Supreme Committee
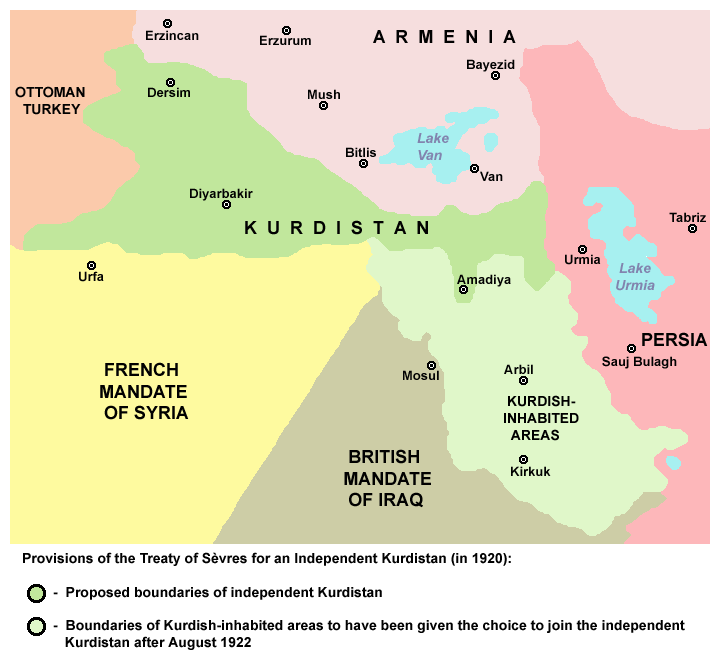
Provisions of the Treaty of Sèvres for an independent Kurdistan (in 1920)

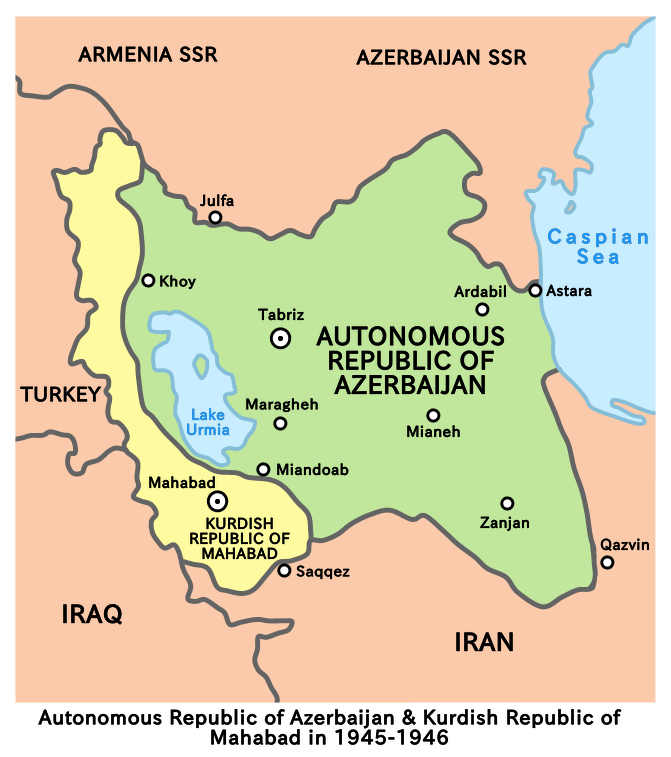
The Republic of Mahabad between 1946 and 1947

The Islamic Emirate of Kurdistan (black) at their peak, controlling most of the Halabja Governorate

== Current entities ==
- Kurdistan Region (semi-autonomous (Note: Attributable to several sources:) federal region (Note: Arabic: اقليم اتحادي, romanized: Iqlīm Ittiḥādī) of Iraq, 1970–present)
- Democratic Autonomous Administration of North and East Syria (de facto autonomous region in Syria, 2012–present)
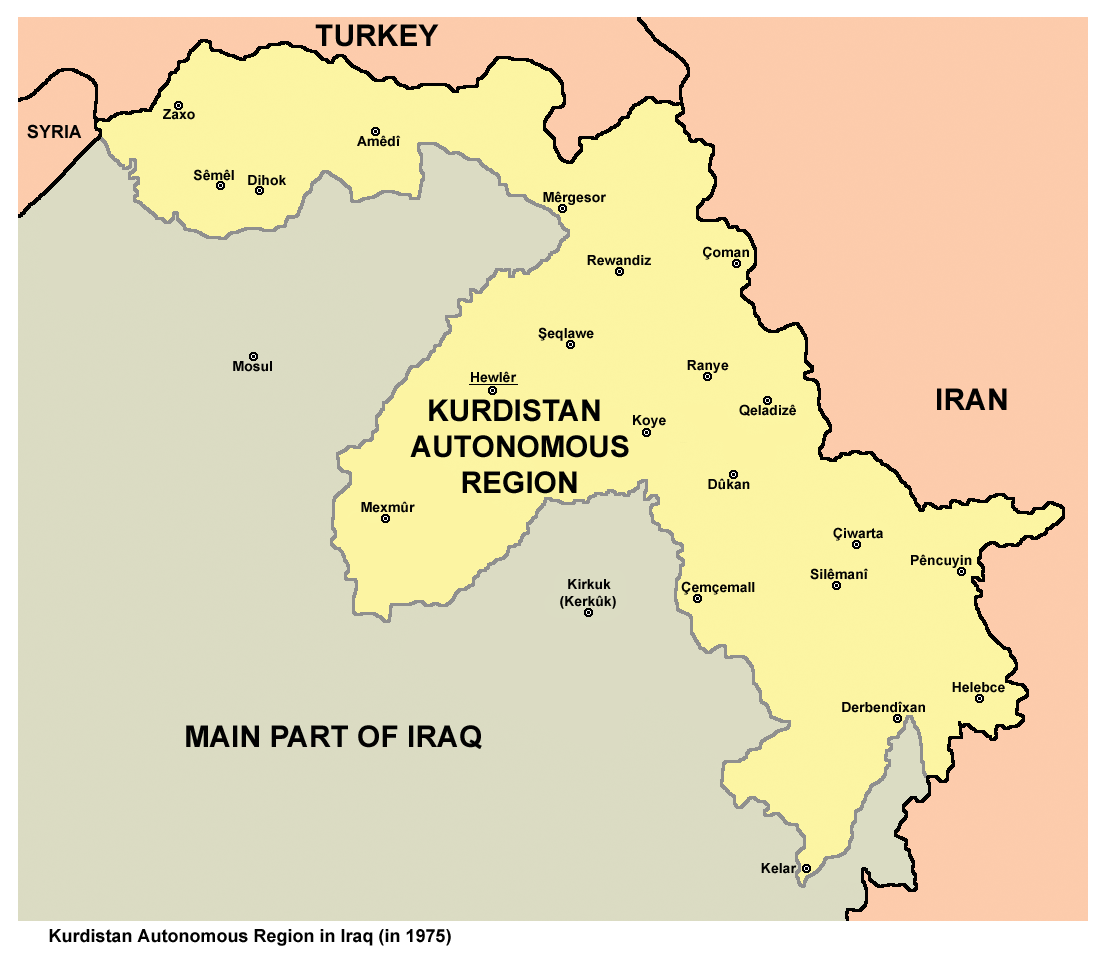
Kurdistan Region in 1975

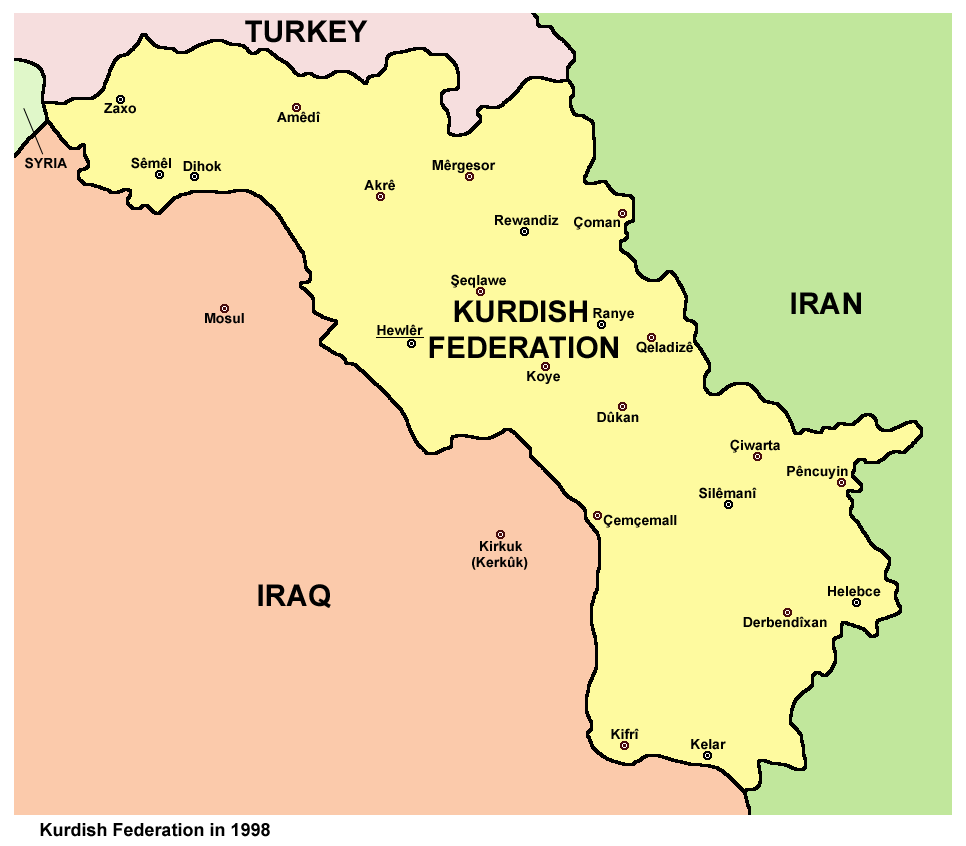
Kurdistan Region in 1998

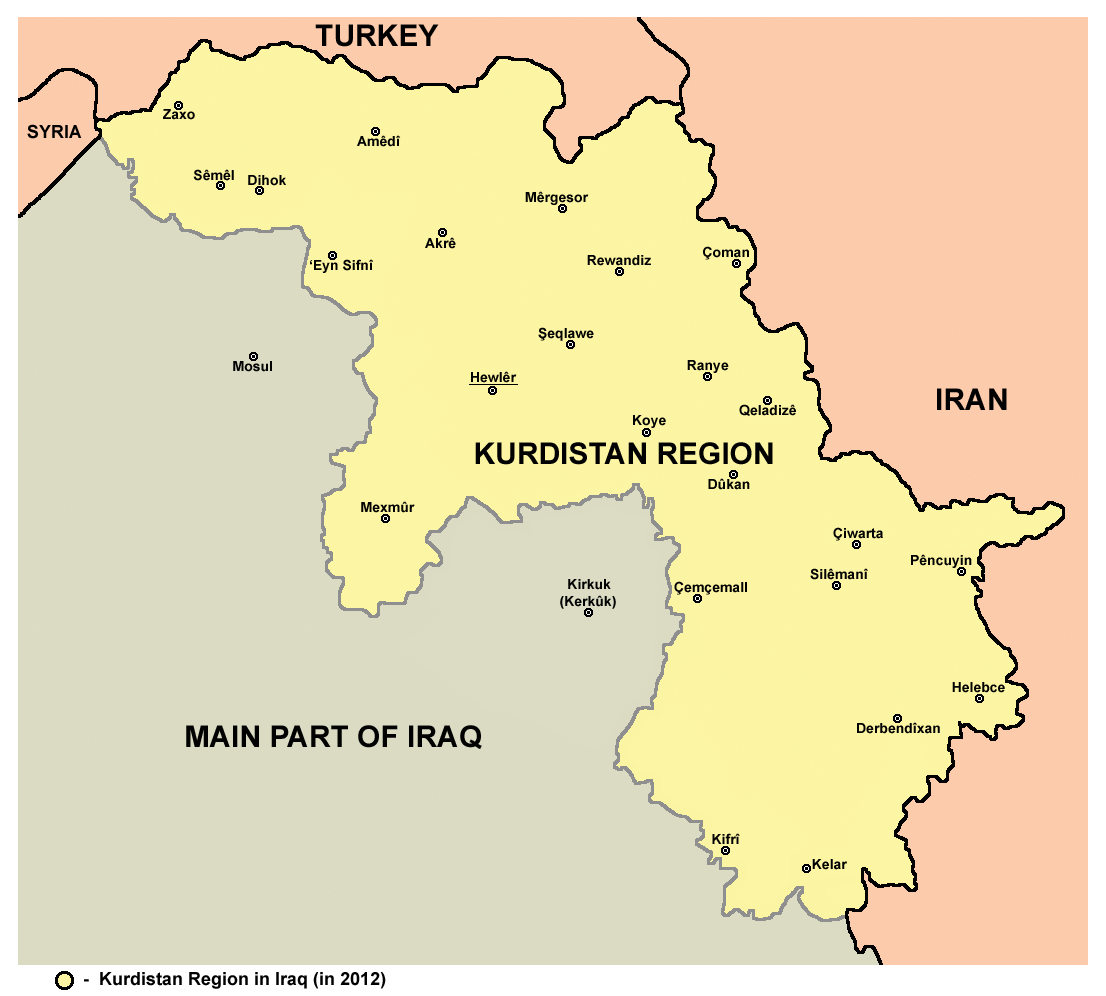
Kurdistan Region in 2012

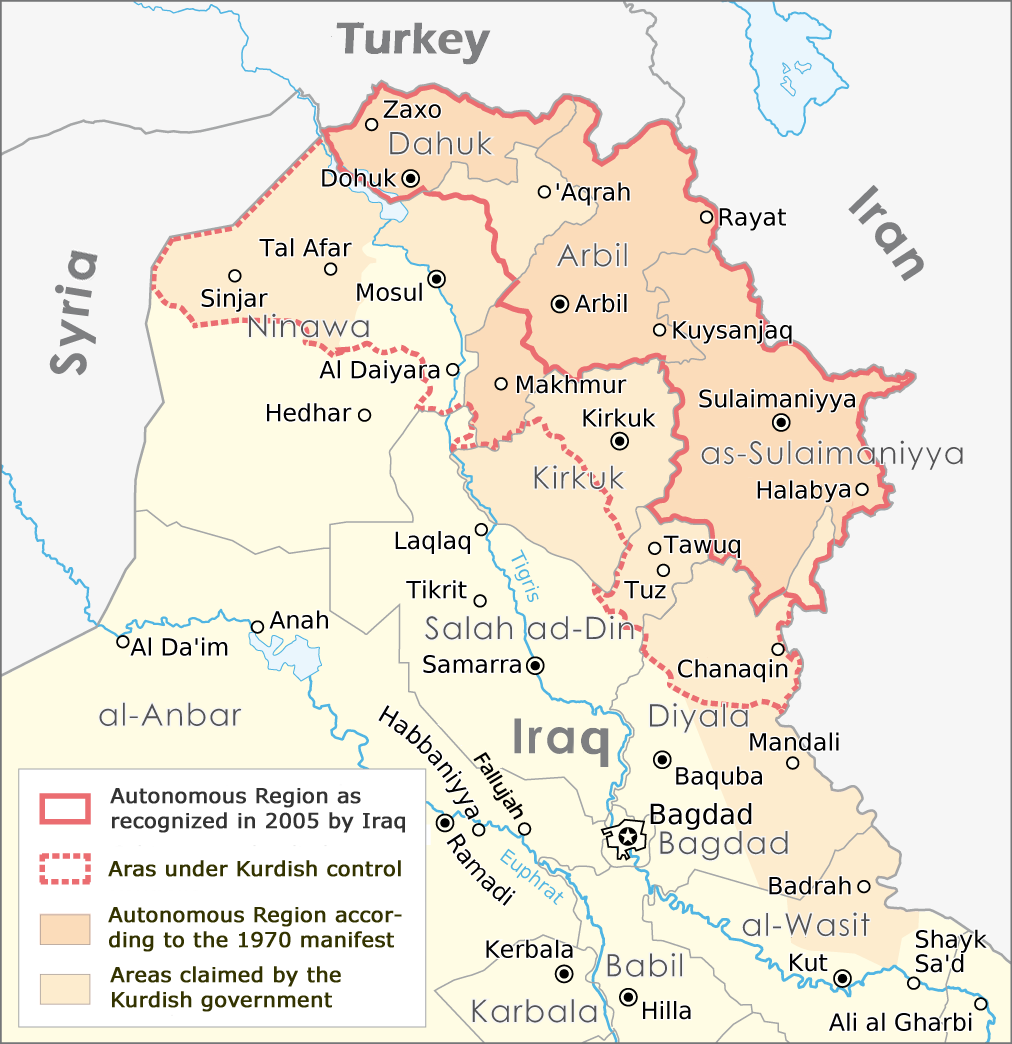
Current situation of the Kurdistan Region

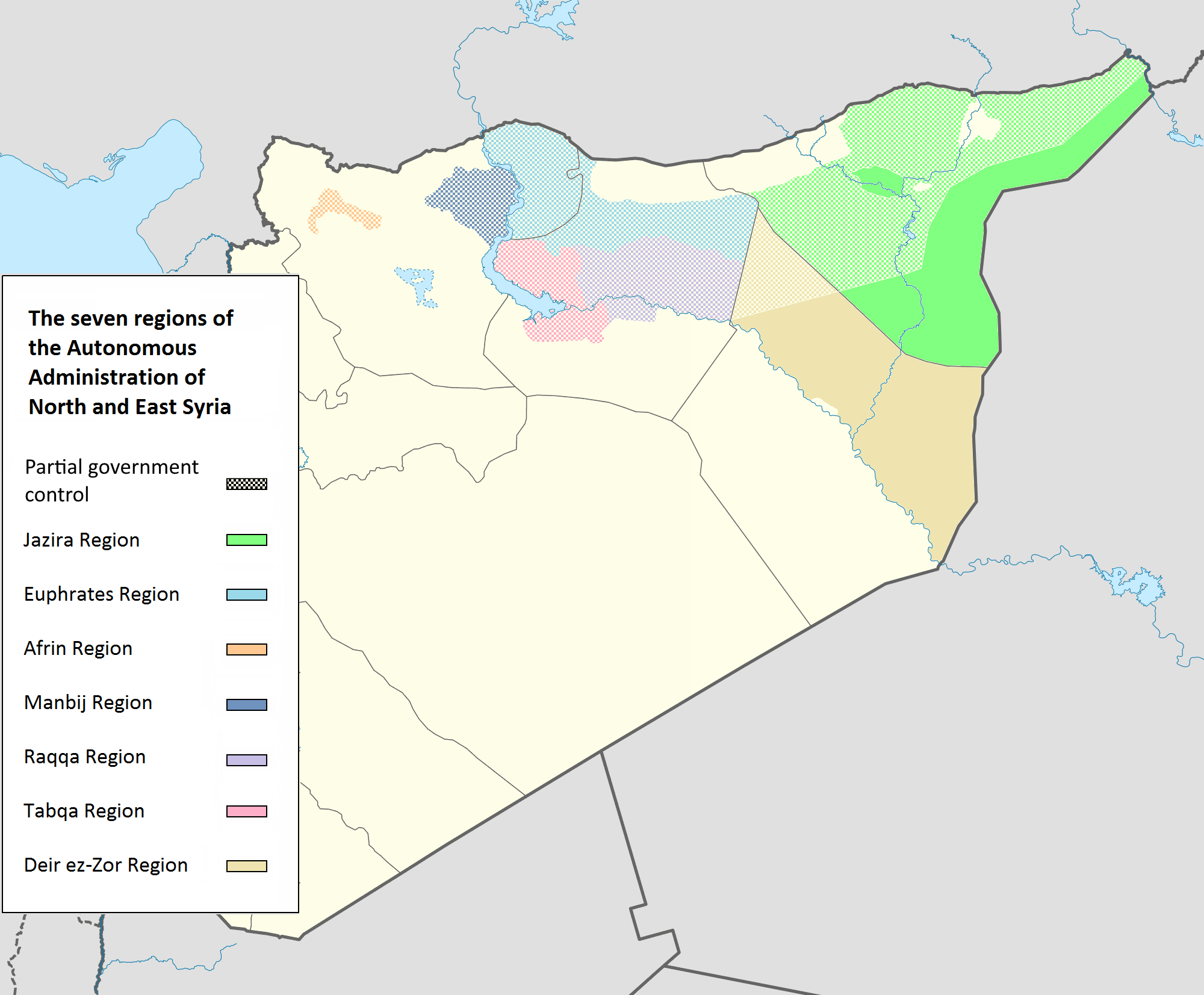
Kurdish-led Autonomous Administration of North and East Syria

== See also ==
- Zuzan al-Akrad
- Kurdish emirates
- Kurdistan Eyalet
- House of Kayus
- Corduene
- A Modern History of the Kurds by David McDowall

== Bibliography ==
- Aboona, Hirmis (2008), Assyrians, Kurds, and Ottomans: Intercommunal Relations on the Periphery of the Ottoman Empire, Cambria Press, ISBN 9781604975833
- Allsopp, Harriet; van Wilgenburg, Wladimir (2019). The Kurds of Northern Syria. Volume 2: Governance, Diversity and Conflicts. London; New York City; etc.: I.B. Tauris. ISBN 978-1-8386-0445-5.
- Baluken, Yusuf (2017), Çend Dokument ji Serdema Mîrektiya Melkîşî (in Kurdish), vol. 7, Jimar
- Amoretti, Biancamaria Scarcia; Matthee, Rudi (2009). "Ṣafavid Dynasty". In Esposito, John L. (ed.). The Oxford Encyclopedia of the Islamic World. Oxford University Press. "Of Kurdish ancestry, the Ṣafavids started as a Sunnī mystical order (...)"
- Matthee, Rudi (2005). The Pursuit of Pleasure: Drugs and Stimulants in Iranian History, 1500–1900. Princeton University Press. p. 18. "The Safavids, as Iranians of Kurdish ancestry and of nontribal background (...)"
- Matthee, Rudi (2008). "Safavid Dynasty". Encyclopædia Iranica. "As Persians of Kurdish ancestry and of a non-tribal background, the Safavids (...)"
- Savory, Roger (2008). "Ebn Bazzāz". Encyclopædia Iranica. Vol. VIII. Fasc. 1. p. 8. "This official version contains textual changes designed to obscure the Kurdish origins of the Safavid family and to vindicate their claim to descent from the Imams."
- Başçı, Veysel (2019), "Dunbulî Beyliği Tarihi ve Tarihi Kronikleri [XIII-XVIII. YY.]", Kadim Akademi SBD (in Turkish), 3 (2): 63–114
- Behn, W. (1988), "Bābān", Encyclopedia Iranica, vol. III, 3
- Büchner, V. F. (2012), "S̲h̲abānkāra", Encyclopaedia of Islam, Brill Publishers, doi:10.1163/2214-871X_ei1_SIM_5253, ISBN 9789004082656
- Dehqan, Mustafa; Genç, Vural (2019), "The Kurdish Emirate of Brādōst, 1510–1609", Oriente Moderno, 99 (3): 306–320, doi:10.1163/22138617-12340222, S2CID 213564665
- Ebraheem, Sharameen (2013), The Impact of Architectural Identity on Nation Branding: The Case Study of Iraqi Kurdistan. (PDF), Manchester Metropolitan University's Research Repository
- Eppel, Michael (2018), "The Kurdish emirates", Routledge Handbook on the Kurds, Routledge Handbooks Online, pp. 35–47, doi:10.4324/9781315627427-4, ISBN 978-1-138-64664-3, S2CID 186808301
- Flynn, Thomas O. (2017), The Western Christian Presence in the Russias and Qājār Persia, c. 1760–c. 1870, Brill Publishers, ISBN 9789004313545
- Ghalib, Sabah Abdullah (2011), The Emergence of Kurdism with Special Reference to the Three Kurdish Emirates within the Ottoman Empire, 1800–1850 (PDF), University of Exeter
- Gunter, Michael M. (2010), Historical Dictionary of the Kurds, Scarecrow Press, ISBN 9780810875074
- Hakan, Sinan (2002), Müküs Kürt Mirleri Tarihi ve Han Mahmud (in Turkish), Pêrî Yayınları, ISBN 9789758245581
- Houtsma, M. Th. (1993), E. J. Brill's First Encyclopaedia of Islam, 1913–1936, Brill Publishers
- Kaplan, Yaşar (2015), Pınyanış Hükümeti/Government of Pinyanish (in Turkish), Hakkari University
- Maisel, Sebastian (2018), The Kurds: An Encyclopedia of Life, Culture, and Society, ABC-CLIO, ISBN 978-1-4408-4257-3
- Meinecke, Michael (1996), Patterns of Stylistic Changes in Islamic Architecture: Local Traditions Versus Migrating Artists, NYU Press, ISBN 9780814754924
- Peacock, Andrew (2017). "RAWWADIDS". Encyclopædia Iranica. "Rawwadidds [...] a family of Arab descent [...] Their Kurdicized descendants ruled over Azerbaijan and parts of Armenia in the second half of the 10th and much of the 11th century."
- Petrushevsky, Ilya Pavlovich (1949), Очерки по истории феодальных отношений в Азербайджане и Армении в XVI–начале XIX вв (in Russian), Saint Petersburg State University
- Soyudoğan, Muhsin (2015), Tribal Bandistry in Ottoman Ayntab (1690–1730), Bilkent University
- Spuler, B. (2012), "Faḍlawayh", Encyclopaedia of Islam, Brill Publishers, doi:10.1163/1573-3912_islam_SIM_2233, ISBN 9789004161214
- Top, Mehmet (1998), "Hoşaptaki Mahmudi Beylerine Ait Mimari Eserler", Academia SBD (in Turkish), 3 (2)
- Ünal, Mehmet Ali (1999), XVI. yüzyılda Çemişgezek sancağı (in Turkish)
- Verheij, Jelle (March 30, 2018), "'The year of the firman:' The 1895 massacres in Hizan and Şirvan (Bitlis vilayet)", Études arméniennes contemporaines (10): 125–159, doi:10.4000/eac.1495, ISSN 2269-5281
- Zabad, Ibrahim (2017). Middle Eastern Minorities: The Impact of the Arab Spring. London; New York City: Routledge. ISBN 978-1-472-47441-4.
