= Pazuki =

Kurdish tribe in Iran

Pazukî (or Pazuki in English language sources) is a Kurdish tribe whose members live in different regions in Kurdistan as well as in and around Tehran, Iran. The tribe is mentioned in the 16th century Kurdish historical book Sharafnama by Sharaf Khan Bidlisi. There are some variants of the name Pazuki and they are known under the various names, like Bazikî, Bozukan, Bazukan etc. Pazukî was originally a tribal confederation like Rojiki Kurds. Some branches of them speak Kurmanji and the others speak Zazakî. But Henry Field mentioned their Iranian branch also as a Turcophonic community in 1939.

== The origin of the name Pazukî ==
There are two suggestions about the origin of the name Pazukî. The first one by Garnik Asatrian who thinks that it comes from Armenian botanical term pazuk which means beet. He shows some Kurdish tribal names which are originated from botanical terms, like Zilî, Sipkî, Mandikî and Pivazî. But according to a recent research, there is one more possibility on its etymology. It is suggested by Aksoy that pazuk may be connected with another word, bazuk, which is the Armenian name for the Pleiades star cluster. His reference is to a Bozukan (from Pazukan) tradition which mentioned by Mark Sykes in his article "The Kurdish Tribes of Ottoman Empire" (1908). Sykes writes that "their tradition is that they used to worship a sword thrust in the ground and the moon and the stars, and they lived under the government of a Christian King named Tavit, who dwelt in the castle of Boso". Aksoy thinks that it is possible to find some cultural continuities between Scythian and Pazuki world, may be by original Armenian clan of Pazukis or directly by Kurdish clan(s).

== History ==
Sharaf al-Din Bidlisi placed the Pazuki among the Kurdish tribes of Iran, claiming their leaders were of Suwaydi origin. The Suwaydi were a Kurdish dynasty which claimed Barmakid origin. Sharaf al-Din Bidlisi added that the Pazuki was divided into two branches, Khalidbeglu and Shekerbeglu, and one was under the emirs of Bidlis, and also added that the Pazuki had no definitive religion and showed signs of heresy. After the battle of Chaldiran, the Suwaydi dispossessed the Pazuki from many of their fiefs, while the Pazuki rose to prominence under Shah Tahmasp.

== Placenames ==
There are some placenames in Turkish Kurdistan which refer to Pazukîs. For example, Bêskan (Erzurum) "Bozik Ușağı köyü" (Ovacık), "Bazikân" (Varto), "Bazikân" (Sasun), "Bazikî" (Urfa, Yaylak), "Bozik" (Urfa), "Bazük" (Adıyaman) etc.

== Prominent individuals ==
The most famous person who belongs originally to Pazukî tribe, is former leader of Kurdistan Workers' Party (PKK), Abdullah Öcalan.

== See also ==
- Emirate of Pazooka
