= Şeref bin Bedir =

16th century Kurdish prince

Emîr Şeref bin Emîr Bedir was a Kurdish prince of the Bohtan principality in the early 16th century, active approximately between 1500 and 1520. Sharafkhan Bitlisi’s Sharafnâma depict him as the leading emir of the ruling family of Cizîre, emphasizing his military capability and generosity. Allied with the Kurdish forces of Bohtan, he fought extensively against the Safavid armies of Shah Ismail I and is credited in the Sharafnâma with winning several major engagements, including one battle reportedly resulting in the death of around 1,700 Safavid soldiers. Ali Miynat notes that his politics were influenced by rivalry with other Kurdish tribes, particularly the Beşnevî. His rule took place within the broader Ottoman–Safavid conflict, during which Safavid pressure eventually forced him into temporary exile.
