= Mir Sayf al-Din =

16th-century Soran ruler

Mir Sayf al-Din (Sorani Kurdish: میر سەیفەددین, romanized: Mîr Seyfeddîn) was a 16th-century Kurdish ruler or claimant of the Soran Emirate, known mainly for recovering Erbil and the hereditary Soran domains after they had been granted to the Yazidi leader Hussein Beg Dasini during the Ottoman reorganization of the region after the conquest of Baghdad in 1534.

The main surviving narrative about him comes from the Sharafnama tradition, repeated by later authors. In this account, Seyf al-Din opposed the transfer of Erbil and the lands of Soran to Hussein Beg Dasini, initially failed against him, later gathered forces from Soran, captured Erbil, and then defeated the Dasini forces in battle.

This arrangement was opposed by Mir Sayf al-Din, described as an emir of Soran. According to the account preserved through the Sharafnama, he first sought refuge in Iran after losing ground, then crossed back into the region in an attempt to recover his domains.

== Historical context ==
In 1534, during the Ottoman campaign that resulted in the capture of Baghdad, Sultan Suleiman the Magnificent ordered the execution of Izz al-Din Shir, a Soran ruler connected with Erbil. After his death, Erbil was granted to Hussein Beg Dasini, a Yazidi leader of the Dasini group, and the lands of Soran were attached to Erbil.

== Recovery of Erbil ==
Sayf al-Din eventually gathered a force from Soran and attacked Erbil while Hussein Beg Dasini was absent. He seized the city and forced Hussein Beg to march back against him. In the battle that followed, Seyf al-Din defeated the Dasini forces. The account preserved by Roger Lescot states that around 500 Dasini men were killed and that Seyf al-Din took considerable booty.

Erdinç Gülcü gives a similar summary in Turkish, stating that Emir Seyfeddin captured Erbil, defeated Dasinli Hüseyin Bey, and that around 500 leading Yazidis were killed. Gülcü also states that Hussein Beg made several later attempts to retake Erbil, but failed, leaving Erbil and the Soran lands in Seyf al-Din’s hands.

== Legacy ==
Seyf al-Din is remembered mainly through this episode. His recovery of Erbil is presented in the source tradition as a restoration of Soran rule over its hereditary territory. However, little is known about his wider life, reign, family, or death. For this reason, modern references to him usually appear in discussions of Hussein Beg Dasini, the Dasini principality, the Yazidis, or the early history of the Soran Emirate rather than in independent biographical studies.

== Bibliography ==
- Guest, John S. (2012) [1993]. Survival Among the Kurds: A History of the Yezidis. Routledge. pp. 48–49.
- Allison, Christine (2017). "The Yazidis". Oxford Research Encyclopedia of Religion. Oxford University Press. p. 8.
- Gülcü, Erdinç (2016). "XVI. Yüzyılın İkinci Yarısında Bağdat Vilayeti'nde Meydana Gelen İsyanlar ve Eşkıyalık Hareketleri". A.Ü. Türkiyat Araştırmaları Enstitüsü Dergisi (in Turkish). 57: 1818.
- Kerborani, Bahadin Hawar (2021). "Paying the Price of Dasht-i Karbala: Historical Perceptions of Yezidis in the Ottoman Era". Kurds and Yezidis in the Middle East: Shifting Identities, Borders and the Experience of Minority Communities. Bloomsbury Academic. pp. 73–75. ISBN 9780755601196.
- Lescot, Roger (1938). Enquête sur les Yezidis de Syrie et du Djebel Sindjār (in French). Beyrouth: Institut français de Damas. p. 120.
