= Şeref bin Muhammed =

15th-century Kurdish prince

Mir Şeref bin Hâcı Muhammed was a Kurdish prince of the Principality of Bitlis in the mid-15th century, active approximately between 1458 and 1467. He was the son of Emir Hâcı Muhammed and briefly co-ruled with his mother, Paşa Hatun. Şeref asserted semi-independent authority over Bitlis and issued coins bearing the inscription “Şeref bin Muhammed” to signify his rule. His reign ended around 1467 upon his death, after which he was succeeded by his brother, Emir İbrâhîm.
