= Principality of Ezdikhan =

Ottoman-era Yazidi principality, 1593–1836

Principality of Ezdikhan Êzdîxan (Kurdish)
- 1593–1836
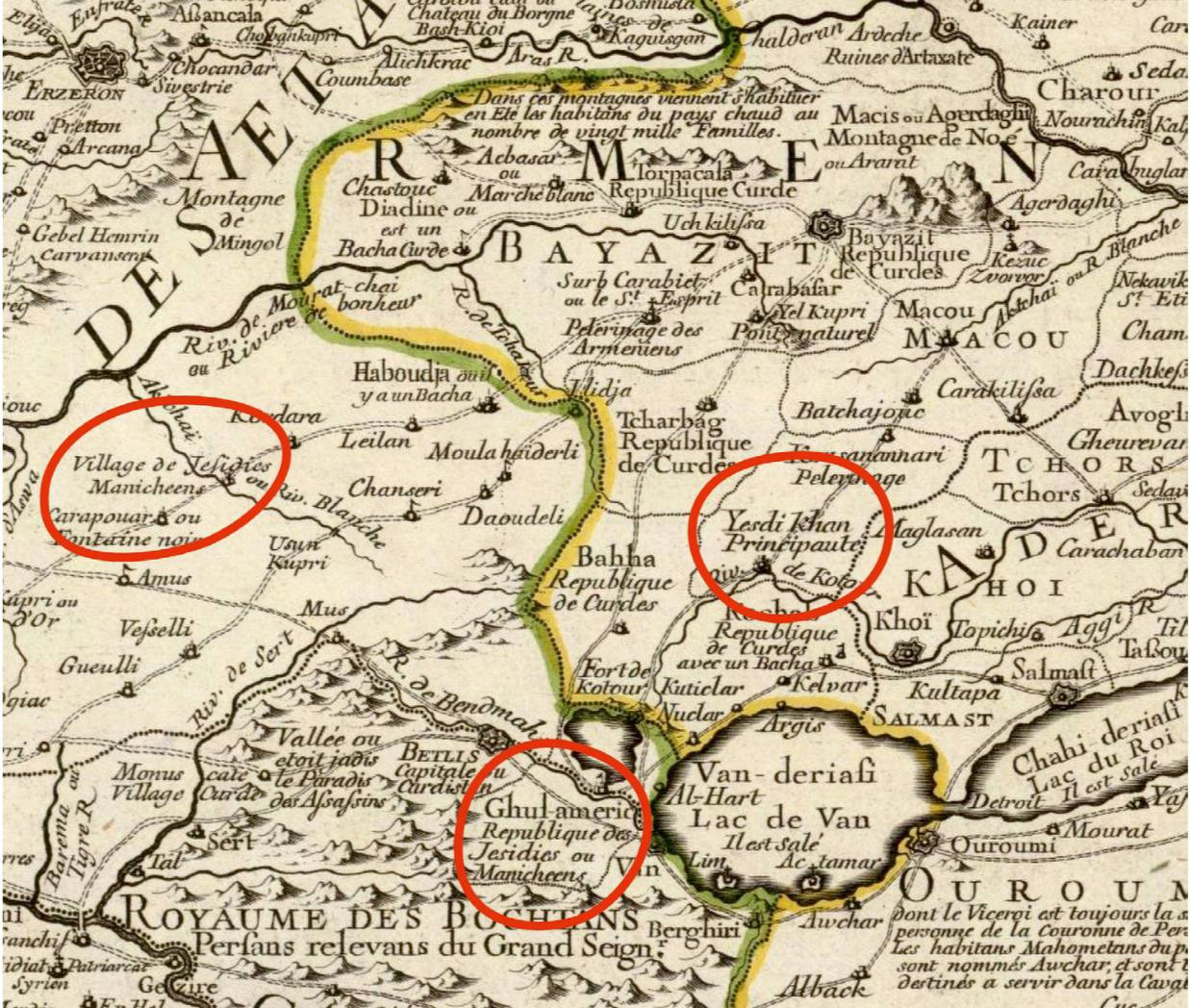
- Part of a map by Guillaume de L’Isle, Mer Caspiene, Pays voisins, 1723, territory near Lake Van designated as "Yezdi Khan Principauté" ("Principality of Ezdikhan")
- Religion: Yazidism
- Government: Principality
- History
  - Established: 1593
  - Disestablished: 1836
Succeeded by
Ottoman Empire
- Today part of: Van Province, Chaldoran County

The Principality of Ezdikhan (Kurdish: Êzdîxan) was a Yazidi principality centered in the Abagha (modern Çaldıran of Turkey and Chaldoran of Iran) region of eastern Anatolia from the late 16th century until the early 19th century. It was governed by the Kok Agha (Axaleri) lineage of the Mahmudi tribal union and exercised authority over a territory traditionally said to comprise 366 villages in the Van vilayet as well as several market towns such as Mahmudiya, Turdchin, Sakimanis and Kurkit. Operating within the Ottoman–Safavid frontier zone, the principality combined tribal leadership with territorial administration under nominal Ottoman suzerainty.

The term Ezdikhan (Êzdîxan), meaning "House of the Yezidis", was applied to dominions of this principality under the rule of Kok Agha family to the north and east of Van. It was characteristic for Yazidi rulers to refer to their territories with a certain level of independence as Ezdikhan (Êzdîxan) or Ezidkhan (Êzîdxan). This was also the name of the Yazidi principality in Sheikhan.

== History ==
=== Background & early history ===
The founders of the Ezdikhan principality, known as the Kok Agha lineage or the Axaleri (Aglar/Agalari), were a Yazidi noble lineage of the Mehemdî (Mahmudi) tribal union which had already founded the principality of Mahmudi in eastern Anatolia. Beginnings of the Mahmudi principality trace back to the early 15th century, during the rule of the Qara Koyunlu confederation. According to the chronicle Sharafnama by Sharafkhan Bidlisi, in which a chapter is devoted to the Mahmudi princes, the Mahmudi originally came from Syria or Jezira. A certain Shaykh Mahmud received the districts of Ashut and Khoshab as a hereditary fief from Qara Yusuf (r. 1389–1420). Furthermore, his son Hussain Beg received the Albak district, which had been taken from the Hakkari rulers. The Mahmudi tribe at this stage was Yazidi in religious affiliation. The early rulers governed mountainous districts east of Lake Van, controlling strategic routes between Anatolia and northwestern Iran.

In recounting the lineage of Shaykh Mahmud, Sharafkhan Bidlisi notes that Hasan bin Iwaz Beg bin Mir Hamid "eliminated the Yazidi heresy" within the Mahmudi tribe, implying that prior to the rule of Hasan Beg, around the mid-16th century, the Mahmudi were entirely Yazidi in religious affiliation. Sharafkhan further records that Hasan Beg later sought refuge at the court of Tahmasp I (r. 1524–1576), who appointed him governor of Mahmudi and granted him control of the fortress of Khoshab, an event dated by scholar Açikyildiz-Şengül to approximately 1550.

This period, during the reign of Suleiman the Magnificent (r. 1520–1566), marked the consolidation and growing strength of the Mahmudi tribe along the Ottoman–Safavid frontier. The 17th-century traveler Evliya Çelebi refers to the tribe on several occasions, noting that the fortress of Maku was entrusted to a Mahmudi Bey after his submission to Suleiman I. He also records that Mahmudi Beys held Malazgirt and describes the tribe as a formidable military force in eastern Anatolia.

By the mid-16th century, while Khoshab itself had come under the control of the islamized Mahmudi branch, the surrounding districts continued to be inhabited by the Yazidi Mahmudi population. As a result, in the second half of the 16th century, the Mahmudi tribe underwent a religious division when the faction that remained adherent to the Yazidi faith broke away from the Khoshab-based branch and relocated northward to the Abagha plain under the leadership of the aristocratic Kok Agha family (Axaleri), who came to be the founders and hereditary rulers of the Yazidi branch of Mahmudi principality centered in Abagha, which at its height comprised 366 villages and several towns with marketplaces, including Mahmudiya. Genealogical traditions trace the ruling family to ancestors Kok Agha and Mîr Choban, who are said to have settled in the Abagha plain in the Van district.

The family is associated with Ottoman service in the second half of the 16th century during the conflicts with Safavid Iran. Some modern accounts attribute the family's imperial grant to the reign of Murad IV; however, archival evidence indicates that the relevant ruler was Murad III. Ottoman records describe the issuance of a charter confirming hereditary rights and privileges to members of the family following their participation in campaigns against Safavid forces.

Yazidi oral tradition preserves a parallel narrative concerning the origins of the family's authority. In this version, a shepherd named Mîro, later known as Choban Agha, hosted an Ottoman ruler or provincial official during a journey through the region. Impressed by his hospitality, the ruler allegedly granted him the title of agha and recognized him as leader of the local Yazidi community. The epithet "Choban" (meaning "shepherd") is understood to derive from this account.

Avdal Agha, the son of Amar Agha and grandson of Mîr Choban, participated in the Ottoman–Safavid conflict during the reign of Murad III. He is described as having distinguished himself in battle against Safavid (Persian) forces, performing "courageous deeds". In recognition of his service, during a tour of the areas bordering Iran in 1593, the Ottoman sultan issued a charter, granting him and his descendants control over a number of towns and districts, along with associated tax revenues and administrative authority. The charter lists multiple generations of ancestors bearing the title of agha, suggesting that the family held elevated status prior to the formal confirmation of its authority:

"This charter was given to Avdal-agha Amar-agha-oghlu Amar-agha Mîr Choban-oghly Mir Choban Avdal-agha-oghly Avdal-agha Avdal-agha-oghly Avdal-agha Haji-agha-oghly Haji-agha Mirza-agha sons of Kiovkan-agha (Kok Axa) and all his hereditary successors"

This charter conferred hereditary possession of the Abagha region, said to comprise 366 villages and several market towns, including Mahmudiya, Turdchin, Sakimanis and Kurkit. This charter is regarded by some scholars as marking the formal establishment of a Yazidi principality under the leadership of the Amar Agha family. It consolidated their territorial holdings in the Abagha region and affirmed their fiscal privileges. The grant also appears to have recognized a form of leadership over Yazidi tribes within the Ottoman domains, although the effective extent of this authority is generally understood to have been limited to eastern Anatolia.

=== Choban Agha and his correspondence with Heraclius II ===
In the 17th and 18th centuries, the Kok Agha dynasty continued to exercise authority within the Mahmudi region of the Van vilayet, an area that retained elements of autonomous Kurdish and Yazidi principalities despite Ottoman administrative reforms. The Abagha plain (modern Çaldıran), situated northeast of Lake Van, formed the core of the Yazidi Mahmudi domain. In correspondence dated 13 August 1770, Choban Agha styled himself "of Abaghlu" and referred to his community as "Mahmud Yezidis", indicating the identification of the Yazidi population of Abagha with the Mahmudi tribal and territorial designation. The region was described as consisting of a large steppe assigned to the Van sanjak, together with surrounding highland pastures (yaylaks) in the Aladag area.

In 1770, the Georgian King Heraclius II established contact with the Yazidis. In a letter he sent to Choban Agha through the Assyrian archbishop Isaiah as intermediary, he proposed a coalition with other non-Muslim communities of the region, such as Armenians and Assyrians, against the Ottomans.

Choban Agha accepted the proposal on the condition that the king would give him his ancestral fortress of Khoshab in return. In his letter to Heraclius II, Bishop Isaiah conveyed that Choban Agha would ask the Georgian king to assist him in the conquest of the Khoshab fortress, which once belonged to his family, who later lost it and moved north. Choban Agha wanted to regain his native lands. Not long before this in 1762, Choban Agha had captured the son of Khoshab's ruler. Subsequently, in response, the ruler of Van launched a campaign against Abagha, took the fortress, and Choban Agha was forced to flee.

Armenian historian Abgar Ioannisyan, who wrote about Joseph Emin based on Simeon Yerevantsi Etchmiadzin's Memorial Book, wrote that several years before Choban Agha's correspondence with King Heraclius II, the well-known Armenian clergyman Hovnan "assigned to the Yazidis, as well as to the Assyrians, a very important role in the joint uprising against the Turks that they were preparing for" and "conducted some negotiations with the Yazidis (i.e. Choban Agha)". In 1764 he wrote with confidence to Emin that the Yazidis also agreed to join them together with the Armenians and take up arms.

According to correspondence dated 23 September 1770, Choban Agha wrote to Heraclius II expressing agreement with a proposed joint action against the Ottoman Empire and referring to the possibility of the king's patronage. The Armenian chronicler Simeon Yerevantsi also described Choban Agha's contacts with an Armenian clergyman, including references to financial assistance and to efforts by an abbot to intercede with the Georgian court on his behalf. In one such account, the abbot stated that Choban Agha, described as a local ruler, had suffered losses at the hands of neighboring authorities, including pashas and khans.

The sources indicate that Choban Agha sought permission from Heraclius II to relocate with his followers to Georgian territory. After initially receiving no effective support, he reportedly left his homeland and moved toward Khoy. Upon arriving there, he again appealed to Heraclius II to accept him and his people. In November 1778, the Georgian king dispatched a detachment to Khoy to escort Choban Agha; however, the Khan of Khoy, identified in the sources as Ahmat Khan, opposed his departure, and the detachment returned without him.

Subsequent correspondence stated that the Khan of Khoy posed a threat to Choban Agha, after which Choban Agha traveled to the Georgian court, where he remained for approximately six months, until May 1779. Heraclius II then sent envoys with Choban Agha to Khoy to request permission for his followers to depart. Although initial approval was reportedly granted for 200 families, the arrangement was later rescinded, and the delegation returned without achieving its objective.

At a later stage, Choban Agha returned to Khoy. According to the same accounts, the Pasha of Van wrote to the Armenian abbot requesting mediation with Heraclius II to allow Choban Agha to depart and return to his homeland under the pasha's authority. Following this intervention, Choban Agha and a representative of Heraclius II set out on 5 June 1779. One source notes that at that time Choban Agha lacked personal resources, and that the Armenian Catholicos provided him with a horse.

Heraclius II perceived Choban Agha as a possible natural ally, writing in a postscript dated 13 August 1770 characterizes Choban Agha (referred to as "Choban-ogly Yezid") as neither Christian nor Muslim and describes him as favorably disposed toward Christians and opposed to Muslims, adding that he sought alliance due to oppression by Muslim authorities:

"This Choban-ogly, whose last name is Yezid, is neither a Christian nor a Muslim. More a supporter of Christians and an enemy of Muslims. He also wants to join us, since they are oppressed by Muslims"

Although the tribe led by Choban Agha declined in influence after his lifetime, it continued to be mentioned in connection with regional developments in the mid-to-late 19th century. In this period, proposals were recorded concerning possible cooperation among Armenian, Georgian, and Yezidi actors in opposition to Ottoman authority.

=== Decline & Migration to Caucasus ===
The decline of the Principality of Ezdikhan appears to have been closely connected with the upheavals that affected the Van region in the early nineteenth century, particularly the revolt of Dervish Pasha in 1816. As commander (muhafız) of the Van garrison, Dervish Pasha initiated an uprising and secured the support of the Sipki tribe of Iranian Kurds. The ensuing conflict, involving both his forces and those of the Mush government, led to widespread devastation across the districts of Mush and Van. Dervish Pasha’s troops also crossed into Iranian territory, prompting a retaliatory invasion by Persian forces. In the course of these events, the fortress of Sedmatesh, was reportedly captured and destroyed, and several thousand families were forcibly resettled, developments which likely weakened the position of the descendants of Choban Agha. Although the precise location of Sedmatesh remains uncertain, it may have been among the possessions of that lineage's property.

During the disturbances of 1816–1819, Dervish Pasha invited the Sipki tribe to settle in the district of Erjish in the Van vilayet; when he later refused to permit their return, the Qajar prince Abbas Mirza dispatched forces to besiege Erjish and subsequently sent troops under the Sardar of Yerevan against Khoshab, described as the center of the Mahmudi dynasty.Although Dervish Pasha and allied Kurdish forces were initially able to repel Persian attacks, including assaults directed against the fortress of Khoshab, the revolt was eventually suppressed by the Ottoman central authorities. In the aftermath, prominent derebeys were executed or brought under firmer state subordination. The Sipki remained in their new settlements, joined by other Kurdish tribes, while additional incursions in the region, such as raids attributed to the Zilanli tribe, caused significant hardship for Yazidi communities, including those of Abagha, contributing to the erosion of the political and military foundations of the Principality of Ezdikhan in the nineteenth century.

Additionally, pressure from settlement of nomadic Muslim Kurdish tribes, described as having begun during the period of Choban Agha, continued in subsequent decades. From the beginning of the 19th century, nomadic Muslim Kurdish tribes brought their herds to the Abagha region during the summer months, attracted by its climate and extensive pasturelands. Over time, seasonal grazing gave way to permanent settlement, leading to disputes over traditional Yazidi lands. As the number of Muslim Kurdish tribes in the area increased, tensions escalated into repeated clashes.

In response to these conditions, "hindered and ravaged by the atrocities of outsiders", Yazidis eventually left the region, and Abagha became permanently settled by Muslim Kurdish tribes. Yazidis sought opportunities for resettlement beyond their traditional territories, including in neighboring regions, leading to the seizure of pastures belonging to Yazidis in Abagha by the increasing number of nomadic Muslim Kurds and migration of local Yazidi residents to neighbouring areas of Bitlis, Mush, Van, Khoy, and Avajiq. A movement of approximately 400 families to Avajiq is referenced in a petition submitted by Khalil Agha , a member of the Axaleri family, to the Viceroy of the Caucasus and the migration to the Russian Empire during this period is also attested in Turkish sources.

Furthermore, in the early 19th century, a war between Yazidis and Muslim Kurds broke out. A Muslim Kurdish bey, Ali Agha, son of Badrkhan Beg, planned to kidnap a girl named Zarif Khatun from the Yazidi family of Kok Agha, son of Choban Agha. Ali Agha invited the Yazidi agha to his son's wedding. At the wedding, the host paid due respect to the Yazidi agha but had treacherously ordered his servant to steal the Yazidi leader's rosary during the feast and go to the latter's house where Zarif Khatun lived. In case she would refuse to leave the house, the servant was ordered to show the girl her father's rosary in order to gain her trust. The plan was successful, and the girl went with the servant. When the Yezidi agha saw his daughter dancing in a circle and realized the Kurdish bey's intentions, he sent a messenger to Khatib Agha, the head of the Yezidis of Karasu district, who lived in the village of Chibukhli. Khatib Agha and his men immediately rushed to the aid of their coreligionists.

As a result, in the early 19th century, the Battle of Zarif Khatun broke out against neighbouring Muslim Kurds, despite the Yazidis defeating Muslim Kurds in the battle, the heavy losses marked the end of Mahmudi military power. Consequently, sections of the family migrated eastward, first into Iran and subsequently into the Russian Empire. According to the petition of Khalil Agha, a member of the family, submitted to the Viceroy of the Caucasus on the 11th of November 1880, his father Amar Agha, together with 275 Yazidi households, moved from the village of Novshor in the Abagha area of the Van vilayet to the Armenia in 1839 and accepted the citizenship of the Russian Empire.

=== Descendants of Kok Agha lineage (Axaleri) in Caucasus ===
From the 1820s and 1830s onwards, Yazidi tribes from the Vilayet of Van and later from the province of Kars as well as from the Surmaly district of the province of Yerevan gradually migrated to Aparan at the foothills of the Alagyaz (called Aragats in Armenian), since the meadows there provided ideal conditions for use as pasture for cattle. Aparan belonged to the Alexandropol district of the Yerevan province and with time, a new tribal confederacy emerged there, called Ela Akhbarane or Êla Axbaranê (lit. Tribal Union of Aparan).

These Yazidis settled in nine villages in the Aparan region (in present-day western Armenia); members of the Kok Agha lineage settled in the village of Mirak where, along with them, lived various other Yazidi tribes such as Dasni, Kandali, Masaki, Khani, Suhani, Mamrashi as well as families of Yazidi sheikhs and pirs. In the Caucasus, descendants of the Kok Agha lineage retained their role as leaders among Yazidis. After moving to Armenia, Amar Agha built a fortress near Stepanavan, called "Amar Agha's Fortress" (Kela Amar Agha). Ruins of this fortress remain until present-day.

Khalil Agha, the son of Amar Agha, served in the Russian military under Count Mikhail Vorontsov, Commander-in-Chief of the Caucasian Army, and took part in operations against North Caucasian highlanders, likely including the 1845 Dargo campaign. From 1846 he served in the militia in the Erivan Governorate. During the Crimean War (1853–1856), he commanded a hundred men and participated in defensive operations along the Ottoman frontier.

In 1854 he was involved in repelling an incursion by Muslim Kurdish forces of the Zilan tribe into the border villages of Alexandropol uezd, facilitating the relocation of local inhabitants to Russian-controlled territory. Russian military accounts from the war refer to Yazidi detachments numbering between one and two hundred fighters operating in the Alexandropol sector, which are associated with his command.

In 1859 he was appointed praporshchik (warrant officer) of police and was awarded the medal "In Memory of the War of 1853–1856" on the ribbon of the Order of St. Andrew. During the Russo-Turkish War of 1877–1878, he served in the Alexandropol Cavalry Irregular Regiment, again commanding a hundred men, and for bravery and devotion in service was promoted to podporuchik (lieutenant) and awarded the Order of Saint Stanislaus (III degree with swords and bow). His military career spanned approximately thirty-five years from the mid-1840s, and by the early 1880s he was recognized as head of the Yazidi community of Alexandropol uezd; in 1884 he was granted a lifelong state pension of 450 rubles per year in recognition of his service and leadership.

== Territory ==
The term Ezdikhan (Êzdîxan), meaning "House of the Yezidis" (also rendered Yezdikan, Ezdi-Khan, or Yezdi Khan), appears on numerous early modern maps for the territory north and east of Lake Van. A 1723 map by Guillaume de L'Isle labels the area "Yezdi Khan Principauté", explicitly identifying it as a principality. A 1751 map by Jean Baptiste Bourguignon d'Anville designates the region as "Ïezdi-kan" and a Russian map of Asian Turkey compiled in 1793 marks the territory between Van and Maku as "Yezdikan". During Ottoman-Iranian border negotiations in 1843, the districts of Mahmudi and Abagha were formally described as "also called Yézidi Khana", confirming the continued recognition of the name in diplomatic usage. The term "Ezdikhan" continued to be used even at the beginning of the 20th century, when in 1915, the "Armenian governor of Van" issued an order, appointing Jangir Agha as "chief of the Ezdi-Khan region".

The principality known as Ezdikhan was centered on the Abagha plain (modern Çaldıran), northeast of Lake Van, within the Ottoman Van vilayet. In the 17th and 18th centuries this region formed part of the broader Mahmudi district. Contemporary sources consistently associate Abagha with the Mahmudi tribal union and its Yazidi branch of rulers under the Kok Agha (Axaleri) lineage.

In a letter dated 13 August 1770 to King Heraclius II of Kartli-Kakheti, Choban Agha styled himself "of Abaghlu" and referred to his community as "Mahmud Yazidis", demonstrating both territorial and tribal identification with the Mahmudi region. In a different correspondence dated 13 August 1770, Bishop Isaiah referred to the area as "Mahmedian Kurdistan", reflecting its identification with the Mahmudi tribal region.

In his travelogue "Description of a Journey Along the Turkish-Persian Border", Mehmed Khurshid Efendi describes Abagha (Mahal Abgay) as a vast steppe assigned to the Van sanjak, situated near the Bargiri sanjak on the southern slopes of Aladag, and surrounded by extensive mountain pastures (yaylaks). The area was agriculturally cultivated and strategically fortified; with Mehmed Khurshid Efendi further noting that Yazidis had “filled this area with their villages, cultivated it, and even built a sufficient number of fortified castles in it to protect themselves from the attacks of the Ashirets (tribes) hostile to them”, referring to the Kurdish Muslim tribes.

The extent of the domain was traditionally given as 366 villages under the authority of the Kok Agha family, also substantiated in the founding charter of the principality issued by Sultan Murad III, which granted Avdal Agha "the province of Abagha with 366 villages" as well as "the towns of Turdchin with all their properties, lands and markets, called Kurkit, Sakimanis and Mahmudiya". According to the travelogue of Mehmed Khurshid Efendi, one of the settlements under the Mahmudi domains bore the name Kalê Choban Agha ("Fortress of Choban Agha"), which was the seat of the Axaleri family. Khurshid Efendi also reports the presence of graves of Yazidi beys in Abagha, over which qubbes (tombs or shrines) were built, one of which had an inscription dating the deceased's death to 1114 AH (1734), indicating the longstanding prominence of the local Yazidi aristocracy. A comparable figure of 360 Yazidi villages was reported by the Ottoman officer Dervish Pasha during mid-19th-century border surveys.

== See also ==
- Yazidis
- Principality of Mahmudi
- Mahmudi (Tribe)
- List of Kurdish dynasties and countries
- Kurdish tribes
- Yazidism

== Bibliography ==
- Mossaki, Nodar; Pirbari, Dimitri (2024). "The rulers of Sarhad Yezdikhan: The history of the Yezidi Lineage of Kok-agha". The International Journal of Yezidi Studies. 1. doi:10.32859/yezidistudies/1/5/113-159.
