= Isfahan Bey =

Emir of Bingöl from 1510 to 1549

- Emir of Bingöl
- Reign: 1510-1549
- Predecessor: Abdal Bey
- Religion: Islam

Isfahan Bey (1510–1549) was a prominent ruler of the Emirate of Bingöl, located in what is now eastern Turkey. He succeeded his father, Abdal Bey, in 1510 and governed during a time of significant political transformation. Following the Ottoman victory at the Battle of Chaldiran in 1514, his emirate came under increasing Ottoman influence.

== Isfahan Bey Mosque ==
The Isfahan Bey Mosque is a significant historical mosque located in the Lower Bazaar (Aşağı Çarşı) of Bingöl, Turkey. It was constructed in the early 16th century by İsfahan Bey, a ruler of the Bingöl Emirate during the Akkoyunlu period. The mosque stands as the only remaining historical building in Bingöl's city center.
