= Emirate of Bingöl =

Kurdish principality

Emirate of Bingöl Mîrîtiya Sûweydiyan
- 1240–1873
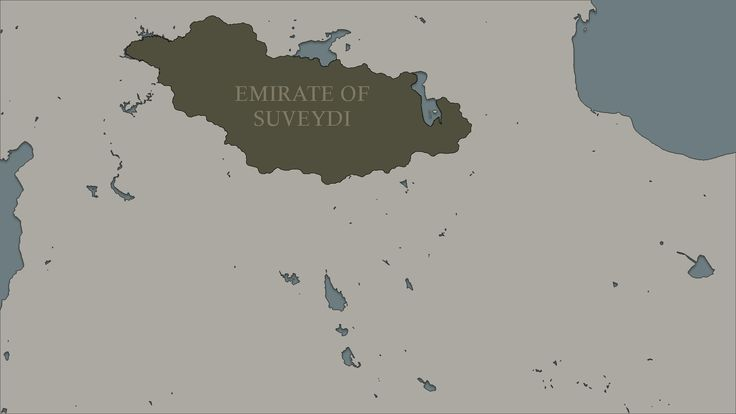
- Map of Bingöl at its peak from 1502 to 1513/1514
- Capital: Çapakçur (modern Bingöl)
- Common languages: Kurdish, Armenian
- Religion: Islam
- Government: Beylik
  - 1240–1873: Suveydi Beys
- History
  - Established: 1240
  - Disestablished: 1873
- Today part of: Turkey; Iraq; Iran; Syria

The Emirate of Bingöl or Süveydi's (Kurdish: Miritiya Cewlike or Miritiya Suweydiyan) was a Kurdish principality established in the region of modern-day Bingöl and its surroundings, and it ruled from the 1240s until 1873. The beylik was founded through Kurdish tribes settled in the region during the Ayyubid period and was ruled for a long time by the Suveydi Beys.

== History ==
Kurdish historian Sharafkhan Bidlisi wrote a myth that the Emirs of Bingöl came from the Barmakid family and that they ruled Bingöl since the reign of the Abbasid caliph Harun al-Rashid.

In the 12th century, after the collapse of the Ayyubid Empire, the Emirate of Bingöl was established, then known under the name of Çapakçur. The Bingöl principality was a vassal to the Mongols, Aq Qoyunlu and Kara Koyunlu, respectively, but it preserved its existence in this turbulent period. After defeating the Azerbaijani-dominated Tabriz, it organized expeditions to eastern and southeastern Anatolia in 1508. The expeditions were directed towards Mosul, Mardin and Diyarbekir. Later the Safavids succeeded in capturing Capakçur, although they also aimed to take over the administrative center of Hançuk. This was prevented by troops of Emir Abdal Bey of Bingöl. The Emir died shortly after the war and his successor was not able to protect Hançuk, and after the Battle of Chaldiran in 1514, the Emirs of Bingöl were subject to the Ottoman Empire. After the death of Abdal Bey, the lands of the emirate were divided into regions as Genç and Bingöl, which came under the control of Palu Emirate in the early 17th century. The emirate was abolished by the Ottomans in 1864. The rulers of the principality were exiled to the city of Harput.

== Emirs of Bingöl ==
Information about the emirate of Bingöl is limited between the 13th and 15th centuries.

- Emir Shap, the first known leader of the emirate
- Abdal Bey (?–1510). His rule was the height of the emirate.
- Isfahan Bey (1510–1549). Bingöl became a part of the Ottoman Empire during Isfahan Bey's reign.
- Suleyman Bey II (1835–1864, when he was exiled to Harput by the Ottomans)
