= Hakkari University =

Public university in Hakkâri, Turkey

- Established: 2008
- Location: Hakkari, Turkey
- Website: Official website

Hakkari University (Turkish: Hakkari Üniversitesi) is a university located in Hakkari, Turkey. It was established in 2008.
