= Principality of Zirqan =

Kurdish principality (1335–1835)

- 1335–1835
- Status: Vassal state of Aq Qoyunlu; Vassal state of the Ottoman Empire; (1514-1830)
- Capital: Mardin (1335–1414); Gürdükan (1414–1709); Ataq (1709–1835)
- Common languages: Kurdish
- Ethnic groups: Kurds
- Religion: Islam
- Government: Principality
- History
  - Established: 1335
  - Annexation by the Ottoman Empire: 1835
Preceded by	Succeeded by
Ilkhanate	Ottoman Empire
- Today part of: Southeastern Anatolia Region; Eastern Anatolia Region

The Principality of Zirqan (1335-1835) was a Kurdish principality founded in the north of Mardin in 1335. During the Aq Qoyunlu period, they controlled the Bitlis, Diyarbakır and Mardin regions. Zirqan principality consisted of Ataq, Tercil, Gürdükan and Mihrani regions.

== History ==
Zirqan Principality was founded in Mardin at the beginning of the 13th century. The founders of this principality claimed Sheikh Hassan Zerraki as their ancestor. It is estimated that Mardin Artuqids lived in the period of Salih Şems al-Din, who ruled between 1312-1364. In 1335, the Zirqan Principality was established after the conquest of Boğat Castle in Silvan by Zeydo, a descendant of Sheikh Hassan Zerraki.

=== Aq Qoyunlu period ===
Zirqan Principality experienced its strongest period during the Aq Qoyunlu period. The Beylik region includes Mardin, Diyarbakir and Bitlis regions. Aq Qoyunlu ruler Uzun Hasan married the daughter of Omer, one of the emirs of Zirqan, in 1483 and the Principality of Bitlis was given to the Principality of Zirqan by Aq Qoyunlu. Zirqan, which was attacked by the Safavids like other Kurdish principalities in 1507, was occupied by the Safavids, except for the Ataq region.

=== Ottoman period ===
The Zirki principalities of Ottoman Kurdistan were dynastic estates governed by Kurdish emirs of the Zirki tribe and granted special autonomy by the Ottoman sultanate from 1514-1835. Selim I made a pact with Kurdish tribal leaders, allowing them to continue to rule over their homelands in exchange for their support in defending the Ottoman borders from the Safavid Empire. After the Battle of Caldiran in 1514, the Zirqan Beylik began to rule the region with other Kurdish principalities within the Ottoman Empire. Zirkan Principality left many architectural works in the 15th century. The most important of these is the Ahmet Bey Mosque. in 1709 The Gürdikan region of the Zirkan Principality passed into the hands of the Bitlis Principality. The rulers of the principality declared their independence in 1830, but after they were defeated by the Ottomans in 1835, their family members were exiled to the city of Edirne, thus ending the Zirkan Principality.
