= Emirate of Bradost =

1510–1609 Kurdish emirate

Emirate of Bradost or Emirate of Biradost (Kurdish: Mîrektiya Biradost, 1510–1609) was a hereditary Kurdish emirate, ruling roughly the area from Rawandiz to Targavar and Margavar south of Urmia at its height. The emirate was founded in 1510 and acted as a bufferzone between the Ottoman Empire and Safavid Iran throughout the 16th century. The emirate ultimately succumbed to the expansionist ambitions of the Ottomans and Safavids in Kurdistan.

The Biradost dynasty claimed descent from the Hasanwayhids.

== Geography and history ==
Biradost has been described as "a central upland consisting of valleys and partial basins surrounded by border ranges". In the 16th century, the emirate ruled Targavar, Margavar, Dul, Somay, and western Urmia.

The emirate ascended from the chaos and political weakness of the Ottomans and Safavids where various Kurdish emirates came to existence.

The founder of the emirate was Yusuf Beg who received the title Gazi Qiran by Ismail I in 1510 as he was given Somay, Targavar and Dol at the Ottoman front. As relations with the Ottomans improved, he received land around Erbil, Baghdad and Diyarbakir by Suleiman the Magnificent after the Battle of Chaldiran in 1514. Gazi Qiran would spy for the Ottomans and was approached by the Ottomans on how to conquer Iran. Around 1534, Emirate of Biradost attacked Safavid-held Urmia and was ultimately allowed to control it by the Ottomans. The emirate then attacked Adilcevaz in 1535. Gazi Qiran ruled until his death around 1543 and would be considered one of the most important Kurdish rulers in later generations. He moreover influenced Soran Emirate and the Gazi Qiran fortress was named after him. After the death of Gazi Qiran, his son Şah Muhemed Beg ruled the emirate until his death. He was succeeded by his son Budaq Beg who ruled until 1582.

The last emir of Biradost Awliya Beg died in 1602 or 1603 and the Safavids ultimately took control of the emirate.

== See also ==
- List of Kurdish dynasties and countries
- Battle of Dimdim
