= Emirate of Pazooka =

Emirate centered around Eleşkirt from 1499 to 1587

Pazooka Emirate
- 1499–1587
- Capital: Eleskirt
- Religion: Islam
- Government: Emirate
- History
  - Established: 1499
  - Disestablished: 1587
Preceded by	Succeeded by
Aq Qoyunlu	Ottoman Empire

The Emirate of Pazuki, was a Kurdish emirate that ruled around Hınıs, Erciş, Malazgirt, Doğubayazıt, and Nakhchivan, with its capital in Eleskirt between 1499 and 1587.

== History ==
It was established in 1499 in the Bitlis region by Huseyin Ali Bey, a Kurdish Pazooka tribe. The Pazooka Emirate was governed by Xalid Bey and was an ally to the Safavid Ismail I. As Xalid Bey lost a hand in the war, he was called “the only Xalid”. Due to his heroism in the wars, a hand made from gold was made by Ismail I. Xalid Bey, who had a sermon and coined money on his behalf in the Pazuki region (today Nakhichevan), had to present his loyalty to the Ottomans after a he separated his ways with his Safavid dynasty. Although he supported the Ottoman Sultan Selim I against Shah Ismail I in the Battle of Chaldiran and fought against him, his killing upon order of the sultan after the war, turned the loyalty of the principality back to the Safavids. After Xalid Beys death, his was succeeded by his son Uveys Bey, pledged his loyalty to the opponents of the Ottomans, namely the Safavids, in order to take revenge. After the oath of loyalty, Erciş, Adilcevaz and Beyazid regions, who remained at the Ottoman border, were given the status of principality and asked to protect the border region. However, the attempt to take control of the Kurds in the region and efforts to expand the area of sovereignty disturbed the governor of Tabriz and thus the Safavid administration, so the Shah wanted to prevent the strengthening of the Kurds in the region by sending the governor of Tabriz Musa Sultan to the Pazuki Emirate. Uveys Bey, who realized that he could not fight against the army that came upon him, had to take refuge in the Ottoman Empire again. The fact that the Pazooka Beys constantly changed their ranks and brought the Kurds together, while ruling independently created problems in the region and also worried the Ottoman Sultan Suleiman the Magnificent. So Kanuni sent news to Durzi Davud and asked the Pazooka Emirate to sword his men. Durzi Davud raided the orders and swept Pazooka Bey and his men. However, two children of Uveys Bey managed to get rid of this massacre and took refuge in Zırıkanlı Ahmed Bey. Kılıç Bey and Zülfikar Bey, who survived the massacre of Uveys Bey, grew up in the tribe and took refuge in Safavid ruler Tahmasp I. The Shah returned the old lands of the Pazooka principality, who took refuge in them. His son Kılıç Bey became the district's lord and his brother Zülfikar Bey replaced him when he died. However, the period of Zülfikar Bey was short. When he died, he was replaced by Kılıç Bey's son. When he was prevented from being a principal by his mother, Yadigar Bey, one of the tribal leaders, passed the principality. Yadigar Bey developed the Pazooka region in terms of zoning and enabled the people to live in peace and prosperity. The peace and prosperity developed in the region caused immigration. When he died, his son, Niyazi Bey, passed away. Niyazi Bey could not maintain the peaceful environment provided by his father, events occurred during his time, he was arrested by Shah Tahmasp and imprisoned in Alamut Castle when he abused his power possibilities. Second Kılıç Bey was appointed instead of Ziya Bey. With the death of Shah Tahmasp and the replacement of his son Sultan Muhammed, the Pazuki Principality came to an end and in 1587, the Safavids ended the existence of this principality.
