= Emirate of Şirvan =

Kurdish emirate of Şirvan

Şirvan Emirate (-1840s, Kurdish: Mîrektiya Şêrwanê) was a Kurdish beylik centered around Şirvan after the fall of the Ayyubid dynasty. The founder of Şirvan was Emir Hasan who was a relative of Emir Kor of the Soran Emirate. The emirate ultimately lost its autonomy due to the Ottoman centralization policies in the mid-1840s and its Kurdish leaders were driven out. At its peak, the emirate included much of the area from Bitlis to Hakkâri including Kurtalan and its rulers were loyal to Bohtan Emirate to the south and its leader Bedir Khan Beg. Although removed from power, the descendants of the former rulers of Şirvan still commanded respect in the area towards the end of the 19th century.

== History ==
The ancestors of the rulers of Şirvan were viziers for the Ayyubids and are said to either have originated from nearby Hasankeyf or from kings in Şirvan, from whom they inherited the principality from. Under Emir Hasan, the territory was divided into three feudal domains: Şirvan (center), Kafra and Irvan. Hasan was succeeded by his son, Emir Shah Mohammed, while his four other sons were sent to different fortresses to govern Kafra and Irvan. After the death of all of Shah Mohammed's brothers, with no male heir to govern the two domains, they were handed over to Emir Shah Mohammed.

When Timur swept through the region in 1394, he also captured Şirvan, which he handed over to Qara Osman of the Aq Qoyunlu in 1402. After shortly being under Kara Koyunlu reign, Uzun Hasan recaptured the region for the Aq Qoyunlu again in 1468. The region was captured by Ismail I in 1508. After the Ottoman victory in the Battle of Chaldiran in 1514, and the supportive stance among the local Kurds, Selim I chose to let Idris Bitlisi and Bıyıklı Mehmed Pasha administer the area until Constantinople centralized its power in the mid-1840s.

== See also ==
- List of Kurdish dynasties and countries
