= Pinyanişi principality =

Kurdish principality (1548–1823)

The Pinyanişi principality, (also known as Shakulu sons) was a Kurdish principality established in 1548 in the Salmas and Somay regions.

== History ==
In the early 15th century, a member of the Bılêcan family from the Kurdish Pinyanişi tribe founded the Principality of Pinyanişi. The first known leader of this family was Shahkulu. For this reason, the Ottomans and Iranians also named this principality the ‘Shahkulu Sons’. With the division of the Hakkari Emirate in 1548, the Pinyaşi principality was established with its capital in Salmas. In 1555, following the signing of the Treaty of Amasya, a calm atmosphere arose between the Ottoman Empire and the Safavid State. However, there was a struggle between the Emirate of Hakkari, the Principality of Mahmudi and the Şahkulu Sons principalities in this calm period. There was an important conflict especially between Shahkulu Sons and Hakkari emir Zeynel Bey. During these clashes, Zeynel Bey provided his military and political support to the Ottoman Empire against the Shahkulu Sons. The Shahkulu sons, who constantly struggled with the Emirate of Hakkari, would control the Hoy region towards the beginning of the 16th century. Shahkulu Koci Bey was killed in the war with Iran in 1605. The lands of the principality were divided into the regions around Salmas and Somay. The Ottoman Sultan Murad IV embarked on a siege of Yerevan in 1635. Throughout the Yerevan siege, the Safavid army from the Urmia region suffered a heavy defeat by the Shahkulu Sons, who cut their paths in the vicinity of Salmas. The existence of the principality ended in 1823 when Iran captured Salmas.

== Bibliography ==
- Kaplan, Yaşar (2015), "PINYANIŞ Government", University of Hakkari (in Turkish): 2–44
