= Emirate of Palu =

Kurdish emirate around Palu (1495–1839 or 1850)

The Emirate of Palu (Kurdish: Mîrektiya Palo; 1495–1850) was a Kurdish emirate which existed in and around Palu from 1495 to 1839 or 1850. During the collapse of the Aq Qoyunlu, Husein Beg, one of the Kurdish lords from the Principality of Eğil, conquered the fortress of Palu in 1495. He established his own principality, which would later be known as the Palu Emirate. Although Husein Beg surrounded Ergani Castle, one of the most important castles in the area, he died before he could capture it. Administration of Palu was passed to his brother, and Palu remained in the hands of Jamshid Beg, son of Rustam Beg. However, the rule of the Mirdâsi did not last long, as they were defeated at Dersim and overthrown by the son of Husein Beg and the contender to the throne, Mustafa Beg. Mustafa Beg then imprisoned his two brothers, Ahmed Beg and Ibrahim Beg.

In 1507, Palu aligned itself with Safavid Iran. As a result of the war between the Ottoman Empire and the Safavid Empire, culminating in defeat for the Safavids at the Battle of Chaldiran, Palu was defeated by the Ottoman Empire in 1514. Jamshid Beg participated directly in the war. In 1516, Jamshid Beg, following the recommendation of Idris Bitlisi, pledged loyalty to the Ottoman Empire. With the help of Şahzade Ahmed Beg, he took the fortress of Arabşah from the Qizilbash in 1517. After this date, the Palu begs were under Ottoman rule.

== Bibliography ==
- Eppel, Michael (2018), Gunter, M. Michael (ed.), The Kurdish emirates: Obstacles or precursors to Kurdish nationalism?, Routledge, ISBN 9781317237983
