= Principality of Suleyman =

Kurdish principality

The Principality of Suleyman or the Principality of Qulb was the Kurdish principality that ruled the Silvan and Qulb regions from the 15th century until 1838. Süleyman Bey (Silivânî) comes from the name of a Kurdish noble family and consists of the Kurdish pronunciation of the name "Süleyman", which is the name of the administrative unit, rather than the town itself.

== History ==
After the Battle of Chaldiran, Kara Behlül became the ruler of the principality, which was separated into Silvan and Qulb in 1514. The Süleyman Principality had amicable relations with the Safavids and in that relationship, Emir Diyadin became a notable figure. The Süleyman's most influential period was during the late 15th century. In the 17th century, he migrated to the Doğubeyazıt region and established the Beyazıt Beylik. The principality ended in 1838 as part of the Kurdish Chiefdoms. The area came under direct Ottoman control following the first Treaty of Erzurum, which was signed in 1823 to settle border disputes between the Ottoman Empire and Persia.
