= Principality of Mahmudi =

Kurdish principality

The Principality of Mahmudi was a Kurdish-Yazidi hereditary polity that emerged in eastern Anatolia during the late medieval and early modern periods. Centered in the regions north and east of Lake Van (modern-day eastern Turkey), it was originally associated with the Yazidi tribal confederation of the Mahmudi and later divided into Sunni Muslim and Yazidi branches.

From the 15th to the 18th centuries, the principality played an important role in the Ottoman–Safavid frontier zone, exercising varying degrees of autonomy under Ottoman suzerainty. The Yazidi-ruled branch of the polity became known in contemporary sources and on European maps as "Ezdikhan" (Êzdîxan), while the Sunni branch governed from Hoşap castle. This principality ruled effectively in strategic areas such as Hakkari and Donboli. However, it collapsed in 1829 after a siege by Han Mahmud, Prıncıpalıty of Miks, and other Kurdish beys.

== History ==
The beginnings of the Mahmudi principality trace back to the early 15th century, during the rule of the Qara Koyunlu confederation. According to the chronicle Sharafnama by Sharafkhan Bidlisi, in which a chapter is devoted to the Mahmudi princes, the Mahmudi originally came from Syria or Jezira. In 1406, certain Shaykh Mahmud received the districts of Ashut and Khoshab as a hereditary fief from Qara Yusuf (r. 1389–1420). Furthermore, supported by Aq Qoyunlu Turkmen, the Mahmudis took Albak (Başkale) and Shambo districts from the Emirate of Hakkari, which Shaykh Mahmud's son Hussain Beg received. The Mahmudi tribe at this stage was Yazidi in religious affiliation. The early rulers governed mountainous districts east of Lake Van, controlling strategic routes between Anatolia and northwestern Iran.

In 1537, after the death of Ivaz Bey's son Hamza Bey, Tahmasp I appointed Hasan Bey as the head of the Mahmudis. In recounting the lineage of Shaykh Mahmud, Sharafkhan Bidlisi notes that Hasan bin Iwaz Beg bin Mir Hamid “eliminated the Yazidi heresy” within the Mahmudi tribe, implying that prior to the rule of Hasan Beg, around the mid-16th century, the Mahmudi were entirely Yazidi in religious affiliation. Sharafkhan further records that Hasan Beg later sought refuge at the court of Tahmasp I (r. 1524–1576), who appointed him governor of Mahmudi and granted him control of the fortress of Khoshab, an event dated by scholar Açikyildiz-Şengül to approximately 1550.

This period, during the reign of Suleiman the Magnificent (r. 1520–1566), marked the consolidation and growing strength of the Mahmudi tribe along the Ottoman–Safavid frontier. The 17th-century traveler Evliya Çelebi refers to the tribe on several occasions, noting that the fortress of Maku was entrusted to a Mahmudi Bey after his submission to Suleiman I. He also records that Mahmudi Beys held Malazgirt and describes the tribe as a formidable military force in eastern Anatolia.

Hosap Castle, which was occupied by Safavids in 1604, was expanded by Süleyman Bey in 1643. The castle gate has its own inscriptions. Turkish traveler Evliya Çelebi describes Hosap Castle and the Mahmudi government in the mid-17th century. Regarding Mahmudi government, he says: "They are all soldiers with six thousand swords. This is the land of the nobility and there is only one Choogoog Mountain. In a country called Ibrahim Bey. These Mahmudis have entered the fire of tribute and there are tribes of timar and zema. 120 tribes."

By the mid-16th century, while Khoshab itself had come under the control of the islamized Mahmudi branch, the surrounding districts continued to be inhabited by the Yazidi Mahmudi population. As a result, in the second half of the 16th century, the Mahmudi tribe underwent a division when a segment broke away from the Khoshab-based branch when the faction that remained adherent to the Yazidi faith relocated northward to the Abagha plain under the leadership of the aristocratic Kok Agha family (Axaleri), who came to be the founders and hereditary rulers of the Yazidi branch of Mahmudi principality centered in Abagha, which at its height comprised 366 villages and several towns with marketplaces, including Mahmudiya.

Despite the religious split however, the surrounding districts still continued to be inhabited by the Yazidi Mahmudi population. Significant information on the Mahmudi Yazidis of Khoshab is recorded in the 18th-century chronicle Van Tarihi (“The History of Van”) by İbn-i Nuh. The chronicle details conflicts between Ottoman forces, led by the governors of Van and Diyarbakır, and the Yazidis. Notably, it describes the attack by Yazidis from Khoshab on Van fortress in 1042 AH (1632–33), the battles between Ottoman troops in Van and the Yazidis of Khoshab in 1127 AH (1715), the defeat of the Van governor by Yazidi fighters in 1128 AH (1716), the subsequent Ottoman victory over the Yezidis, and the later uprising of Khoshab Yazidis against the Van administration.

In 1829, the Mahmudi principality came to an end when Miks' Emir Khan Mahmud and other Kurdish lords seized Hoşap Castle through a bloody siege.

== Axaleri Branch of Abagha (Ezdikhan) ==
After part of the Mahmudi tribe converted to Sunni Islam and consolidated control over Hoşap, another significant faction that remained Yazidi relocated northward to the Abagha plain (modern Çaldıran region) under the leadership of the Kok Agha lineage, a hereditary ruling family that established a semi-independent principality centered in Abagha. From the late 16th century onward, the territory of this principality developed into what contemporary and later sources called Ezdikhan (Êzdîxan), literally “Land of the Yazidis.”

Following the participation of Avdal Agha, a member of the Kok Agha lineage, Avdal Agha, in the Ottoman–Safavid conflict during the reign of Murad III, he was reportedly commended for his conduct in battle against Safavid forces, described as having distinguished himself in battle against Safavid forces and performing "courageous deeds". In recognition of his service, In 1593, during an imperial tour of the frontier regions bordering Iran, the Ottoman sultan issued a charter granting Avdal Agha and his descendants control over several towns and districts, together with associated tax revenues and administrative authority.

This charter is regarded by some scholars as marking the formal establishment of a Yazidi principality under the leadership of the Kok Agha family. This charter conferred hereditary possession of the Abagha region, said to comprise 366 villages and several market towns, including Mahmudiya, Turdchin, Sakimanis and Kurkit. It consolidated their territorial holdings in the Abagha region and affirmed their fiscal privileges. The grant also appears to have recognized a form of leadership over Yazidi tribes within the Ottoman domains, although the effective extent of this authority is generally understood to have been limited to eastern Anatolia

== Bibliography ==
- Top, Mehmet (1998), "Hoşaptaki Mahmudi Beylerine Ait Mimari Eserler", Academia SBD (in Turkish), 3 (2): 6–9
