= Sharafnama =

1597 book by Sharaf al-Din Bitlisi

- Author: Sharaf Khan Bidlisi
- Language: Persian
- Genre: History
- Publication date: 1597
- Publication place: Safavid Iran
- Media type: Print (Hardback & Paperback) & Audio book
- OCLC: 55981507

The Sharafnama (Kurdish: شەرەفنامە Şerefname; Persian: شرفنامه Sharafnâmeh; lit. 'The Book of Honor') is a book written in 1597 by the medieval Kurdish historian, poet and prince Sharaf al-Din Bitlisi (1543–1599) in Persian. Sharafnama is regarded as an important, and the oldest, source on Kurdish history. It deals with the different Kurdish dynasties, such as the Ayyubid Dynasty of Saladin, ancient and Medieval Kurdish principalities in the Middle East and the Caucasus, as well as mentioning the pre-Islamic ancestors of the Kurds.

== History ==
Although the Sharafnama is a work of Kurdish history, it was written in Persian. Given the context of Sharaf Khan's time, this choice was, in a sense, inevitable. After his father, Shams al-Din Khan, sought refuge at the court of Safavid Shah Tahmasp I (r. 1524-1576), it is not surprising that Sharaf Khan, who received a high-quality education alongside the princes in Shah Tahmasp’s palace in Qazvin and mastered Persian like a native speaker, chose to write this work in that language. His decision was driven both by the desire to reach a wide audience across the Persian-speaking regions and to enhance his dynasty’s legitimacy in the broader world. Upon completing his book, Sharaf Khan sent copies to the Kurdish leaders of Kilis (Husayn Jānbūlād) and Ardalan (Halo Khan). This gesture could have been aimed at demonstrating the Bidlis ruler’s dynastic authority and gaining broader recognition, while also indicating that Persian was read and written in the courts of other Kurdish rulers.

== Translations ==
In 1873–1875, François Charmoy, a French scholar, translated it from Persian into French and published it in Saint Petersburg, Russia. At the right, it is a Kurdish–French dictionary, made by Alexandre Jaba, and published in 1879 in Saint Petersburg, too. The Sharafnama has been translated into German, Arabic, English, Ottoman, Russian, and Turkish. In 1972 the Kurdish scholar Abdurrahman Sharafkandi, translated the book from Persian into Kurdish.

== Gallery ==
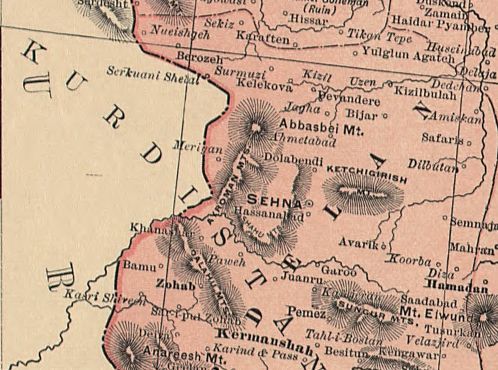
State of Ardalan

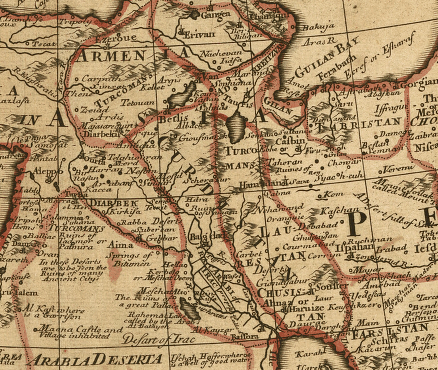
Kurdistan as a province in Persia

Sharaf Khan Bidlisi

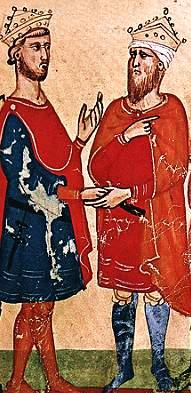
Frederick II, Holy Roman Emperor (left) meets Al-Kamil of Ayyubid (right).

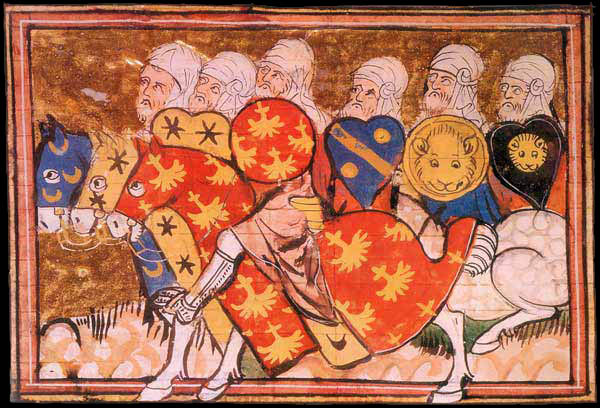
Battle of Hattin

== See also ==
- List of Kurdish people
- Kurdish history
- Ayyubid Dynasty
