= Bulduqani =

Kurdish dynasty

The Bulduqani (c. 1049–1864) were a Kurdish dynasty that ruled an emirate around the town of Eğil founded by Pir Mansûr (b.989), who conquered the town around 1049. Pir Mansûr claimed to be a descendant of Mohammed and settled in the area from Hakkâri (around Sinjar Mountains) in 1049. His descendants ruled Eğil for nearly eight centuries. During the rule of Emir Muhammed, the principality had expanded southward to Karaca Dağ, Palu and Elazığ northward, Çermik to the west and the area between Hani and Lice to the east.

== History ==
During the reign of the Marwanids, Kurds from the Humeydiye, Beşneviye and Zuzaniye tribes settled in Eğil changing the composition of the area to the detriment of the Armenian, Greek, and Syriac-speaking population. It was during this period that Pir Mansûr settled in the town of Dicle which was populated by Kurds of the Mirdesan tribe. Pir Mansûr ultimately became their leader due to their admiration of him. Pir Mansûr would also become a murshid, a status his son and successor retained. It was during the next two rulers – Pir Musa, son of Pir Mansûr and his grandson Pir Bedir, that the Principality of Eğil was established. This is attributed to the support received from various tribes including the Mirdesan and their leadership on Sufism.

Pir Bedir's reign was short as he was killed during the Seljuk siege of the territory in 1087. He was succeeded by his son Emir Bulduk who was born after Pir Bedir died in exile. Bulduk's mother died after giving birth and he was raised by the Mirdesan tribe. By the time the Emir of Eğil was Ibrahim the Mirdesan abandoned the title "Pir" for "Emir". After the death of Emir Ibrahim, the principality was shared between his three sons.

In 1441, the Aq Qoyunlu ruler Jahangir (r. 1444–52) forged an alliance with the Bulduqani, though this was a convenience as opposed to a concrete agreement. The same year, Jahangir's brother and successor Uzun Hasan (r. 1452–78) married the daughter of the Bulduqani ruler Dawlatshah. Despite familial ties, Dawlatshah's son Isa joined the Battle on the Tigris against Uzun Hasan in 1457. The Bulduqani, specifically Dawlatshah's daughter, was involved in a faction to install her son Ughurlu Muhammad as the leader of the Aq Qoyunlu against his half-brother Sultan Khalil (r. 1478) in a rebellion that lasted from 1474 to 1477.

The principality was subsequently captured by the Safavids, which then lost it to Selim I. The Ottomans allowed the locals of the principality to govern themselves and would not interfere and it was exempted from the timar system. However, when the Ottomans began losing land on the Balkan Peninsula, it started recruiting men from Eğil ultimately ending its special status. In 1864, all of its privileges were abolished and the emirate dissolved.

== See also ==
- Sheikh Said rebellion

== Bibliography ==
- Gördük, Yunus Emre (2014), "Eğil Emirliği'nin Kısa Tarihçesi ve Eğil Emirlerine Ait Şecere Metninin Tercümesi" (PDF), OTAM (in Turkish), 35
- Woods, John E. (1999). The Aqquyunlu: Clan, Confederation, Empire. New York.
