= Principality of Bitlis =

Kurdish principality

- 1182–1847
- Status: Sovereign State (1182–1467) (1495–1507) (1514–1655); Ruled by: Aq Qoyunlu (1467–1495); Safavids (1507–1514); Ottoman Empire (1655–1847)
- Capital: Bitlis
- Common languages: Armenian; Kurdish; Persian (ruling class/elite, bureaucracy, chancery, literary, Sufis, mercantile, scholarly, madrasas, building inscriptions, gravestone inscriptions)
- Government: Principality
- Khan/Hakim
  - 1578-1597: Sharaf al-Din Bitlisi
- History
  - Established: 1182
  - Disestablished: 1847
Preceded by	Succeeded by
Seljuk Empire	Ottoman Empire
- Today part of: Bitlis Province

The Principality of Bitlis, also known as the Bitlis Khanate, and the Bitlis Emirate (1182–1847), was a culturally Persianate Kurdish principality centered at Bitlis. It originated from the Rojaki (or Rozagî) tribal confederation.

Armenians constituted the overwhelming majority of the population of the principality and the cities within it.

== History ==
The Rojaki defeated the Georgian King David the Curopalate and conquered Bitlis and Sasun in the 10th century. The principality occasionally came under the rule of outsiders, such as the Aq Qoyunlu (from 1467 to 1495) and the Safavids (from 1507 to 1514). After the decline of the Aq Qoyunlu, the Rojaki princes asserted their independence. The principality supported the Ottoman Sultan Selim I, and in return its rulers were named Noble Khans. In 1531, the Rojaki prince withdrew his support from the Ottomans and turned towards the Safavids instead, an event that led to the capture of the principality by the Ottomans.

A good era for the principality began in 1578, when Sultan Murad III nominated Sharaf al-Din Bitlisi the Emir of the principality. Until 1596, eighteen Rojaki princes ruled the principality.

The Rojaki khans maintained their relative independence during the long rivalry between the Ottomans and the Safavids. In 1665, Abdal Khan's status as the Emir of the principality was strengthened after a visit to Bitlis by the Ottoman sultan Murad IV, as he supported the Ottomans in their feud with the Safavids. Abdal Khan has been described by the French traveller Jean-Baptiste Tavernier as the most powerful Kurdish prince. According to him, Abdal Khan was independent and did not acknowledge the Safavid or Ottoman states. Evliya Çelebi has praised Abdal Khan as a renaissance prince and owner of a library of books in several languages. Several European travelers noted the ability of the emirate to call in militias (up to 12,000 cavalry forces) in order to defend itself. The autonomy of the principality ended in 1655 as Emir Abdal Khan entered into conflict with the Malik Ahmad Pasha, the Wāli of Van at the time. Abdal Khan was accused of confiscating properties in Bitlis by merchants in Van and an his closeness with the Yazidis. As result, the Ottoman Empire ended its tolerance towards the autonomy of the principality of Bitlis and it was integrated into the Van eyalet.

== Persian language and culture ==
For centuries, Bitlis and neighboring Kurdish principalities were profoundly influenced by Persian language and culture due to their connections with Persian-centered empires. Persian was the language of administration, used by Sufis, poets, merchants, and scholars. By adopting Persian, Bitlis’s ruling classes and elites aimed to integrate themselves into the broader Persianate world, portraying their social environment as part of this prestigious tradition. From the 14th century, Persian literary production flourished in Bitlis, with notable works by Idris-i Bidlisi and Sharaf Khan. Persian was predominant in palace education, madrasas, personal correspondence, and literary and historical writings. Despite a shift to Turkish in Ottoman bureaucracy during the 16th century, Persian continued to be used in Bitlis for communications with Safavid shahs and for inscriptions on buildings and gravestones. Although Bitlis’s role as an imperial vassal is documented only to a limited extent, surviving records show that Persian remained the language of bureaucracy and diplomacy in the Bitlis court throughout these centuries. Persian manuscripts filled the palace library, and its influence persisted in daily life and cultural practices well into the 19th century.

== See also ==
- List of Kurdish dynasties and countries
