= Sharafkhan Bidlisi =

Kurdish noble and writer (1543-c.1603)

- Emir, Beg, Mir and Khan
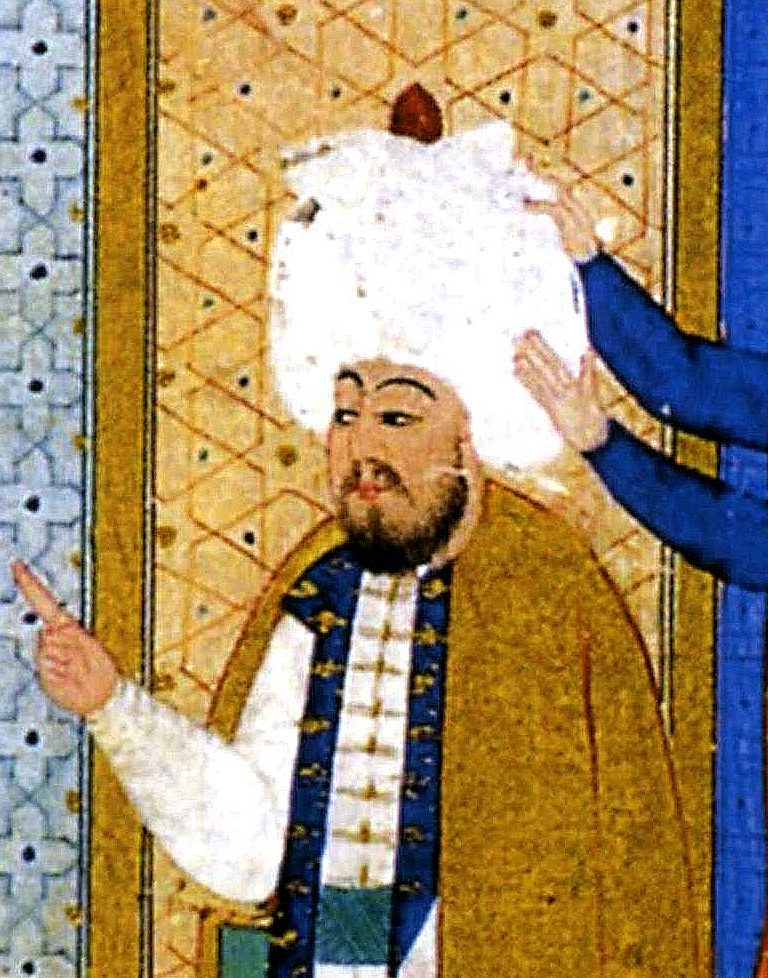
- Contemporary depiction of Sharafkhan (detail) exchanging the Safavid Taj-e Haydari turban for the Ottoman headdress. Nusretname, 1578-80 (TSM H1365 140b)

Emir of Bitlis
- Predecessor: Shamsaddin Beg (as emir of Bitlis); Ulama Tekelü Han (as beylerbey of Bitlis)
- Successor: Shamsaddin Beg Abulmalik
- Born: 25 February 1543; Karahrud, Safavid Iran
- Died: 1603–1604 (60–61 years old)
- Issue: Shamsaddin Beg Abulmalik
Names
- Sharaf Khan Bidlisi
- Dynasty: Rojekî
- Father: Shamsaddin Beg
- Mother: A daughter of Emîr Han Musullu
- Religion: Sunni Islam

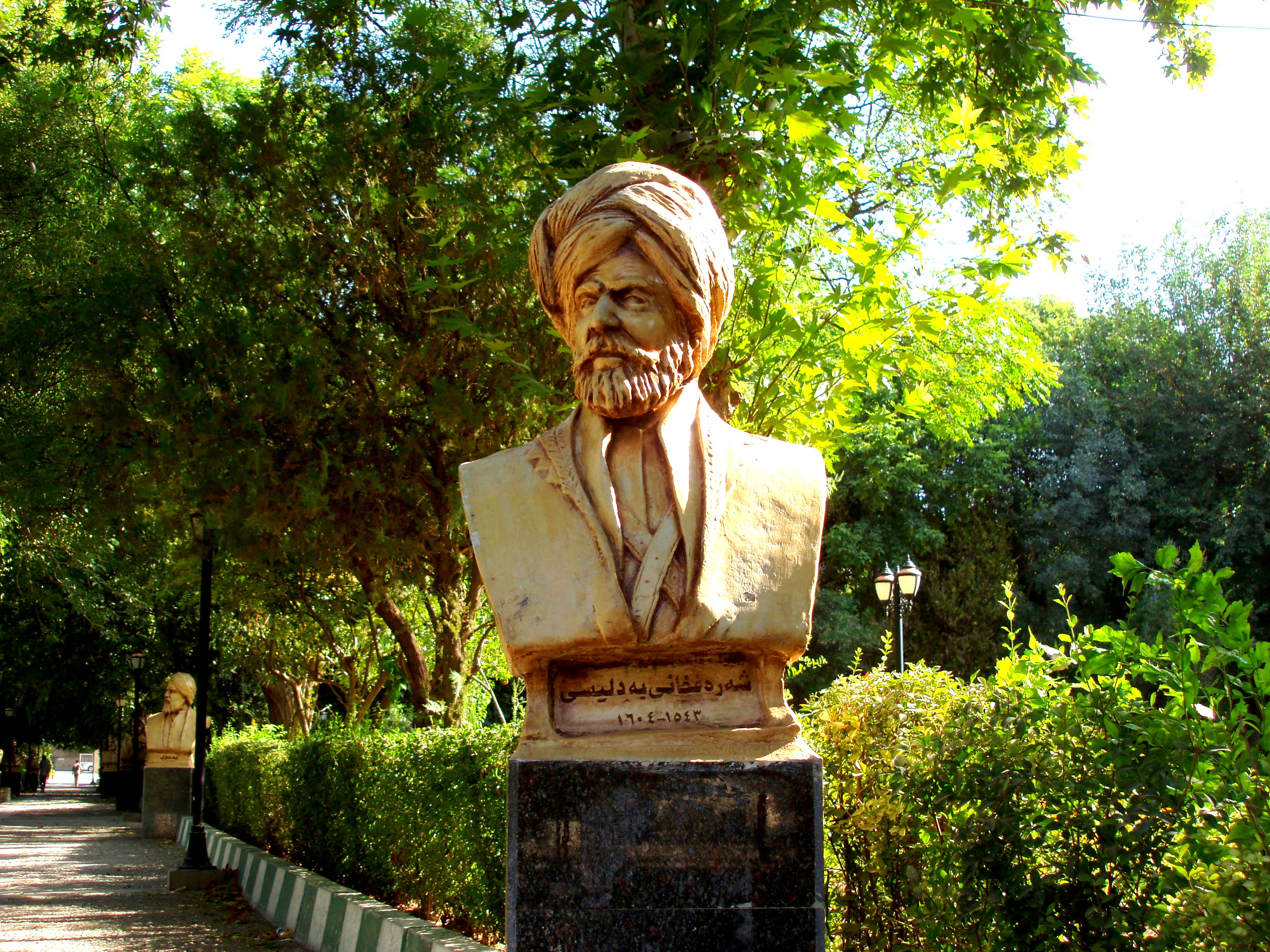
Sharaf Khan Bidlisi statue at Slemani Public Park in Silêmanî, Iraqi Kurdistan

Sharaf al-Din Khan b. Shams al-Din b. Sharaf Beg Bedlisi (Kurdish: شەرەفخانی بەدلیسی, Şerefxanê Bedlîsî; Persian: شرف‌الدین خان بن شمس‌الدین بن شرف بیگ بدلیسی; 25 February 1543 – c. 1603–04) was the Kurdish Emir of Bitlis. He was also a historian, writer and poet. He wrote exclusively in Persian. Born in the Qara Rud village, in central Iran, between Arak and Qom, at a young age he was sent to the Safavids' court and obtained his education there.

He is the author of the Sharafnama, one of the most important works on medieval Kurdish history, written in 1597. He created a good picture of Kurdish life and Kurdish dynasties in the 16th century in his works. Outside Iran and Kurdish-speaking countries, Sharaf Khan Bidlisi has influenced Kurdish literature and societies through the translation of his works by other scholars. According to the Sharafname, the lineage of the Bitlis rulers traces back to Behvat, the son of Jamsab, one of the Persian Khosrows. After Jamsab's death, his sons Nersi and Surhab assumed administrative duties, while Behvat settled in Bitlis-Ahlat and lived a life detached from conquest politics. This lineage shows that the rulers of Bitlis had kinship ties with the Rustamdar and Shirvan dynasties, and also reveals that Sharaf Khan descended from these rulers.

He was also a gifted artist and a well-educated man, excelling as much in mathematics and military strategy as he did in history.

== Early life ==
Sharaf Khan Bidlisi was born on 25 February 1543, in the Markazi province of Iran in the Garmrood village, during the exile of his father. His father was Shamsheddin, a Kurdish Beg,

Sharafkhan was a member of the ruling house of Rojakî tribal confederation, whose members ruled the Bitlis Emirate at the time. and had ruled intermittently as an independent emirate since at least the 9th century. Sharafkhan therefore never took up the common tribal title of "Khan", preferring instead the royal title of emir or mir, "prince." He was most commonly known as Mir Sharaf (Prince Sharaf).

Later his family was taken under protection of the Safavid dynasty. He was schooled at Tahmasb's court, and wrote in 1596:

When I turned nine (in 1551) I entered the private harem (haram-i khass)... for three years (1551–1554) I served the family (Silsila) of that refined (pakiza atvar) shah as a page at the inner palace.

— Sharaf Khan Bidlisi

Bedlîsî spoke of his education entailing instruction in the Quran, readings on the principles of shari'a, piety and purity. Due to Shah Tahmasp's religious disposition, Bidlisi was introduced to religious scholars, who warned him against evil people, and instead encouraged friendship with the virtuous. And once Bidlisi attained maturity, he was taught the martial arts (sipahigira), archery, polo, racing, swordsmanship, and the precepts of chivalry – humanism and generosity.

== Reign ==
In 1576 Tahmasb of the Safavids gave him the title of Mir of Mirs and appointed him leader of all Iranian Kurdish tribes. He accepted his title, but only two years later, Sharafkhan abandoned his previous stand, and supported the Ottomans in their war against the Iranians, offering them 400 soldiers. In 1578, Sultan Murad III, the Ottoman Sultan, granted Sharafkhan the title of Emir and he became the Mir of the Emirate of Bitlis. Between 1578 and 1588, Sharafkhan virtually led all the Ottoman wars against the Persians. In 1597, Sharafkhan gave the authority of his dynasty to his son Šams-al-Dīn.

== Sharafnama ==
Sharaf Khan Bidlisi was planning for a long time to write a book about Kurdish history, and finally in 1597 he started writing his epic, Sharafnama. Written in Persian, the Sharafnama divides its history into four parts. The first one deals with the five Kurdish dynasties that have enjoyed status as royalty (Saltant): the Marwanids of Amed, the Hasanwayhids of Dinavar and Sharizur, the Fadluyids of the Great Lur, the princes of little Lur, and finally, Saladin the Great and the Ayyubids. The second part lists dynasties that have had coin struck and the khutba recited in their names. (The Khutba is a religious invocation pronounced at the Friday day prayers meeting that mentions the Prophet, the first four caliphs and the current rulers). The third part numbers the families of the hereditary governors, while the fourth details the history of the mirs of Bitilis.

It was, in a sense, inevitable for Sharaf Khan to compose the Sharafnama in Persian given the circumstances of his time. After his father, Shams al-Dan Khan, sought refuge at the court of Shah Tahmasp, it is not surprising that Sharaf Khan, who received a high-quality education alongside the princes in Shah Tahmasp's palace in Qazvin and mastered Persian like a native speaker, chose to write this work in that language. His decision was driven both by the desire to reach a wide audience across the Persian-speaking regions and to enhance his dynasty’s legitimacy in the broader world. Upon completing his book, Sharaf Khan sent copies to the Kurdish leaders of Kilis (Husayn Jānbūlād) and Ardalan (Halo Khan). This gesture could have been aimed at demonstrating the Bidlis ruler's dynastic authority and gaining broader recognition, while also indicating that Persian was read and written in the courts of other Kurdish rulers.

== See also ==
- Kurdish history
- List of Kurdish dynasties and countries
- List of Kurdish philosophers
- List of Kurdish scholars
- Mem and Zin

== Sources ==
- Alsancakli, Sacha (2017). "Matrimonial Alliances and the Transmission of Dynastic Power in Kurdistan: The Case of the Diyādīnids of Bidlīs in the Fifteenth to Seventeenth Centuries". Eurasian Studies. 15 (2): 222–249. doi:10.1163/24685623-12340037.
- Floor, Willem M. (2008). Titles and Emoluments in Safavid Iran: A Third Manual of Safavid Administration, by Mirza Naqi Nasiri. Washington, DC: Mage Publishers. p. 248. ISBN 978-1933823232.
- Osman Gazi Özgüdenli (1988–2016). "ŞEREF HAN (ö. 1012/1603-1604) Şerefnâme adlı tarihiyle meşhur olan Bitlis hâkimi.". TDV Encyclopedia of Islam (44+2 vols.) (in Turkish). Istanbul: Presidency of Religious Affairs, Centre for Islamic Studies.
- Yamaguchi, Akihiko (2021). "The Kurdish frontier under the Safavids". In Matthee, Rudi (ed.). The Safavid World. Routledge. pp. 556–571.
