= Kurdish tribes =

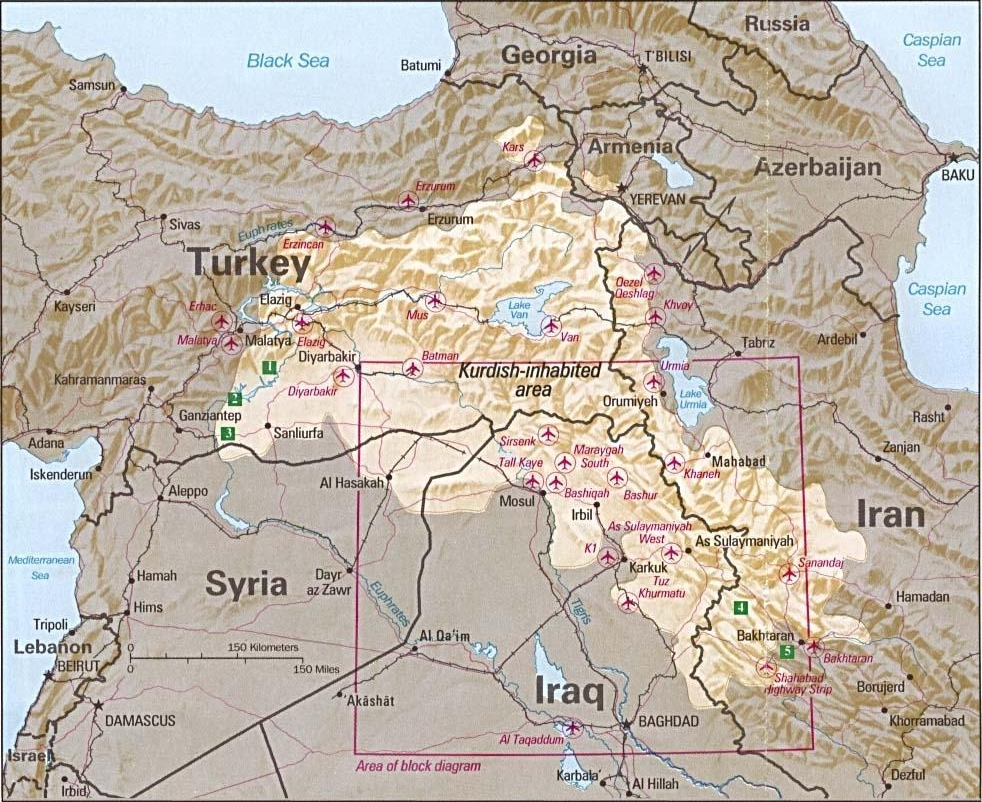
Kurdish-inhabited areas (Kurdistan)

Kurdish tribes are tribes of Kurdish people, an Iranian ethnic group from the geo-cultural region of Kurdistan in Western Asia.

The tribes are socio-political and generally also a territorial unit based on descent and kinship, real or putative, with a characteristic internal structure. They are naturally divided into a number of sub-tribes, and each of these sub-tribes again are divided into smaller units: clans, lineages and households.

== Designation ==
Each Kurdish tribe use different kinds of terms to designate "Tribe", "sub-tribe", "Clan", "lineage" and "household"; 'Ahiret, Tira, Hoz, il, Khel, Tayfa or Taifa, Zuma and Rama. These terms are used loosely and interchangeably despite the tribal structure and organization of all Kurdish tribes are almost the same.

== History ==
=== Early record ===
In the 9th century, it was reported by Ibn Khordadbeh that Kurdish tribes used the word Zūma to designate tribes (Kurdish: زوومە, Zūma; lit. 'Tribe').

The 9th-century historian, Ya'qubi, recorded present of tribes of Kurds in Kermanshah, Saymara, Hulwan and some villages in Spahan region. Al-Mas'udi reported the Kurdish tribes locations; the tribe called Šūhīān or Šāhīān at Dinawar and Hamadan, Māǰordān at Kankavar and many other tribes that were present in the Jibal region. Estakhiri, the 10th-century author and traveler reported Kurdish tribes presence at the vicinity of Takrit. Ibn Hawqal reported on Hadhbāni, Humaydi and Lari tribe.

== Armenia and Georgia ==
Kurdish tribes in Armenia and Georgia consist of Yazidis who arrived in Caucasus from the regions of Van, Kars and Dogubayazit during two main waves of migrations, the first wave taking place during the Russo-Ottoman wars of 19th century (1828–1829 and 1879–1882) and the second wave taking place during World War I, especially during and after the Armenian genocide where Yazidis were also targeted alongside Armenians. Before migrating, Yazidis formed an integral part of Kurdish tribal interactions in the Ottoman Empire. The Yazidis of Armenia who arrived during the first wave of migrations, settled in Aparan and Talin provinces in the mountainous regions of Aragatz, whereas the Yazidis who arrived during the second wave settled in villages across Ashtarak, Echmiadzin and Armavir.

=== Tribal confederations ===
The present tribes and tribal confederations with their sub-tribes are listed below:

- Xaltî
- Anqosî
- Axlerî

Zuqiriya Confederation

- Baravî
- Bûtikî
- Belekerî
- Dasinî
- Divinî
- Korkitiya
- Kurtikî
- Masekî
- Chokhreshî
- Memreshî
- Mendesorî
- Mendikî
- Reshî
- Reshkî
- Shemsika
- Sorî

Mehemdiya Confederation

- Mehemdî
- Memresha

Hesiniya Confederation

- Belekerî
- Beyandûrî
- Bûvkî
- Dasinî
- Dawidî
- Divinî
- Dodkî
- Gêloyî
- Kashakhî
- Mamtajî
- Memîdokî
- Mekhsûdî
- Mûskî
- Mîrangî
- Qazanî
- Qûchî
- Remoshî
- Sherqî
- Tûzhkî
- Ûdî
- Ortilî (Disputed)

Sipki Confederation

- Belî
- Chîlî
- Îsedizî
- Kashakha
- Karêyî
- Kilêrî
- Mikhayla
- Pîvazî
- Rejevî
- Rojkî
- Sahaniya
- Stûrkî
- Shanezera
- Shemsika
- Utî

== Azerbaijan ==
A large portion of the centuries-old Kurdish population in present-day Azerbaijan was deported by the Soviet Union to Central Asia from the 1930s onwards. The remaining Kurdish population in the former Red Kurdistan area (Lachin and Kelbajar districts) was displaced by ethnic-Armenian forces during the first Nagorno-Karabakh War, whilst the Kurds outside of the conflict zone in Azerbaijan became heavily assimilated into Azerbaijani culture.

The information on the tribes in Azerbaijan is from 1936:

Tribes
Alihan	Aliyan	Babali	Bargushat	Bozlu	Ferihkan	Gajisam	Gulukchi	Hasenan	Karachorlu	Kelani
Kulekan	Kulpucci	Milan	Pugian	Pusian	Shadmanli	Sheylanli	Sisiyan	Sultan	Tahmas	Terter

== Iraq ==
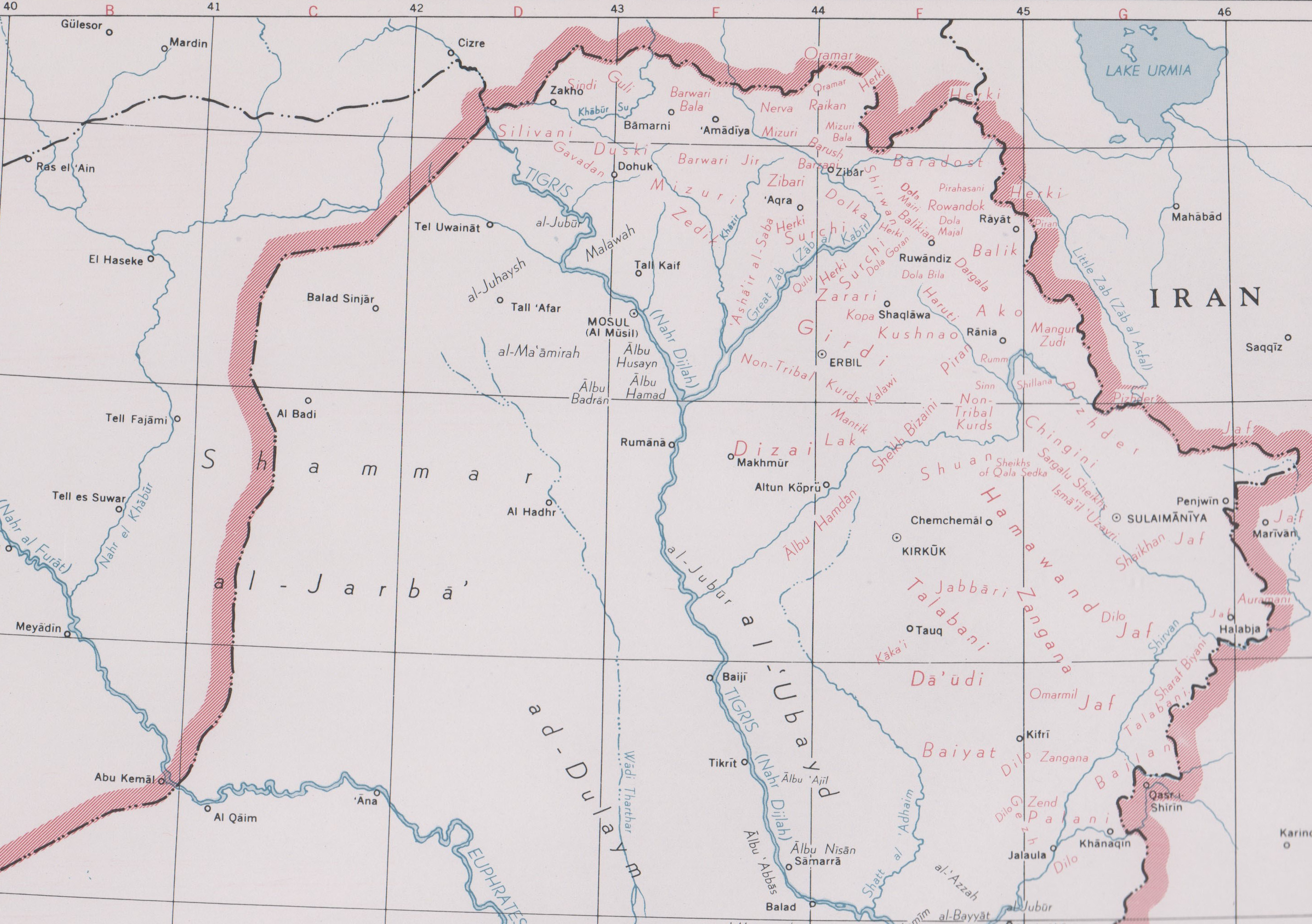
Map of the tribes of Iraq around 1950s by the CIA. The names of the Arab tribes are written in black; the names of the Kurdish tribes are in red.

=== Baghdad Governorate ===
The following tribes are present in Baghdad Governorate:

- Feyli tribe

=== Diyala Governorate ===
The following tribes are present in Diyala Governorate:

- Bacelan tribe
- Biban tribe
- Gurkuş tribe
- Delo tribe
- Feylî tribe
- Hemawend tribe
- Caf tribe
- Kaganlu tribe
- Kakeyî tribe (Yarsanism)
- Kakevar tribe
- Kelhurr tribe
- Leylani tribe
- Mamhajan tribe
- Palani tribe
- Qarah Alush tribe
- Suramiri
- Şeyxbizin tribe
- Tilishani tribe
- Umarmil tribe
- Zargush tribe
- Zend tribe
- Zengene tribe

=== Dohuk Governorate ===
The following tribes are present in Dohuk Governorate:

- Babiri tribe
- Bamernî tribe
- Barzani tribe
- Basidkî tribe (Yezidi)
- Berwari tribe
- Belesinî tribe (Yezidi)
- Birîmenî tribe (Yezidi)
- Dina tribe (Yezidi)
- Dinnadi tribe (Yezidi)
- Kochar tribe
- Dolamarî tribe
- Doski tribe
- Dumilî tribe (Yezidi)
- Ertuşi tribe
- Guli tribe
- Hewêrî tribe (Yezidi)
- Hekarî tribe (Yezidi)
- Heraqî tribe (Yezidi)
- Mamûsî tribe (Yezidi)
- Mlhmbani tribe
- Mamesh tribe
- Misûsan tribe (Yezidi)
- Mizûrî tribe
- Nerway tribe
- Nheli tribe
- Pêdayî tribe (Yezidi)
- Qaîdî tribe (Yezidi)
- Qirnayî tribe (Yezidi)
- Rêkanî tribe
- Rûbanistî tribe (Yezidi)
- Sharafani tribe
- Sindî tribe
- Sipna tribe
- Silêvanî tribe
- Sûrçî tribe
- Tirk tribe (Yezidi)
- Tovi/Tuvi/Toviye tribe
- Xaltî tribe (Yezidi)
- Xetarî tribe (Yezidi)
- Zêbarî tribe

=== Erbil Governorate ===
The following tribes are present in Erbil Governorate:

- Balak tribe
- Ako tribe
- Barzani tribe
- Barzinji tribe
- Bilbas tribe
- Bradost tribe
- Dizayee tribe
- Dolamari tribe
- Gerdi
- Haruti tribe
- Herki tribe
- Kawani tribe
- Khailani tribe
- Khoshnaw tribe
- Mantik tribe
- Nanakali tribe
- Shwan tribe
- Siani tribe
- Siyan tribe
- Surchi tribe
- Zarari tribe
- Zebari tribe

=== Halabja Governorate ===
- Jaff tribe

=== Kirkuk Governorate ===
The following tribes are present in Kirkuk Governorate:

- Amarmel tribe
- Barzinji tribe
- Biban tribe
- Delo tribe
- Hemawend tribe
- Jabari tribe
- Kaka'i tribe (Yarsanism)
- Salehi tribe
- Siyan tribe
- Sharafbayani tribe
- Shuhan tribe
- Talabani tribe
- Zangana tribe

=== Nineveh Governorate ===
The following tribes and confederations are present in Nineveh Governorate:

==== Xorkan Tribal Confederation (Yezidi) ====
- Aldexî tribe
- Adiyan tribe
- Aldîn tribe
- Bekran tribe
- Cefrî tribe
- Çêlkan tribe
- Dilkan tribe
- Heskan tribe
- Hewîrî tribe
- Helîqî tribe
- Kurkurka tribe
- Mendikan tribe
- Mûsanî tribe
- Mehirkan tribe
- Musqora tribe
- Mala Bakê tribe
- Qîçkan tribe
- Qîranî tribe
- Reshkan tribe
- Simûqî tribe
- Sherqiyan tribe
- Shehwanî tribe

==== Cuwana Tribal Confederation (Yezidi) ====
- Aqosî tribe
- Bekira tribe
- Çûkan tribe
- Dilkan tribe
- Emeran tribe
- Hebaban/Hebabat tribe
- Howêrî tribe
- Hilêqî tribe
- Heskan tribe
- Kizan tribe
- Korkorkî tribe
- Mashekî tribe
- Mihirkan tribe
- Xinan tribe
- Mala Xalitê tribe
- Miskora tribe
- Qîçikan tribe
- Hesenî tribe
- Nukrî tribe
- Eldinan tribe
- Usivan tribe
- Xosî tribe
- Elî Sorka tribe
- Xifshan tribe

==== Other ====
- Bajalan tribe
- Duchi tribe
- Fuqarah tribe (Yezidi)
- Gergeri tribe
- Hasenan tribe
- Kaka'i tribe (Yarsanism)
- Kiran tribe

=== Saladin Governorate ===
The following tribes are present in Saladin Governorate:

- Kaka'i tribe (Yarsanism)

=== Sulaymaniyah Governorate ===
The following tribes are present in Sulaymaniyah Governorate:

- Ardalan tribe
- Bajalan tribe
- Barzinji tribe
- Chegini tribe
- Guran tribe
- Hamawand tribe
- Jaff tribe
- Jibari tribe
- Kalhor tribe
- Mangur tribe
- Shwan tribe
- Zangana tribe

=== Wasit Governorate ===
The following tribes are present in Wasit Governorate:

- Feyli tribe

== Iran ==
=== Ardabil province ===
The following tribes are present in Ardabil province:

- Delikan tribe
- Qolugjan tribe
- Shatran tribe

=== Bushehr province ===
Zangeneh tribe

=== Chaharmahal and Bakhtiari province ===
- Zangeneh tribe

=== East Azerbaijan province ===
The following tribes are present in East Azerbaijan province:

- Chalabianlu tribe
- Mohammad Khanlu tribe
- Shaqaqi tribe

=== Fars province ===
The following tribes are present in Fars province:

- Chegini tribe
- Kordshuli tribe
- Kuruni tribe
- Lashani tribe
- Uriad tribe
- Zangana tribe

=== Gilan province ===
The following tribes are present in Gilan province:

- Amarlu tribe
- Reşwan tribe
- Jalalvand
- Ilbeigi

=== Golestan province ===
- Aghili
- Kiani
- Kakavand
- Jahanbeiglu
- Sepanlu
- Zafaranlu

=== Hamadan province ===
The following tribes are present in Hamadan province:

- Chahardoli tribe
- Falak al-Din tribe
- Ghiasvand tribe
- Jalilvand tribe
- Kakavand tribe
- Musavand tribe
- Torkashvand tribe
- Zand tribe
- Zola tribe

=== Ilam province ===
The following tribes are present in Ilam province:

- Arkavazi tribe
- Badreh tribe
- Balavand/Zardalan tribe
- Beyrey/Ali Sherwan tribe
- Dehbalai tribe
- Dilfan tribe
- Eyvan tribe
- Feyli tribe
- Kalhor tribe
- Khezel tribe
- Kolivand tribe
- Malekshahi tribe
- Rizehvand tribe
- Shuhan tribe

=== Isfahan province ===
- Golbaghi (Gulbaghi) tribe
- Zarrabi (Kashan)
- Donboli (Kashan)

=== Kerman province ===
- Lak
- Khajevand
- Jalilvand

=== Kermanshah province ===
The following tribes are present in Kermanshah province:

- Ahmedvand tribe
- Bajalan tribe
- Bajulvand tribe
- Balvand tribe
- Dinarvand tribe
- Ghiasvand tribe
- Guran tribe
- Hulilan tribe
- Jaff tribe
- Jalilvand tribe
- Kakavand tribe
- Kalhor tribe
- Karam Alivand tribe
- Kerindi tribe
- Khalvand tribe
- Kolya'i tribe
- Kuruni tribe
- Mafivand tribe
- Namivand tribe
- Nanakuli tribe
- Osmanvand tribe
- Payirvand tribe
- Qalavand tribe
- Sanjâbi tribe
- Shabankara tribe
- Sharafbayani tribe
- Torkashvand tribe
- Zangana tribe
- Zola tribe

=== Khorasan provinces ===
The following tribes are present in North Khorasan province and Razavi Khorasan province:

- Amarlu tribe
- Baçvan tribe
- Badlan tribe
- Berivan tribe
- Bicervan tribe
- Bilbas tribe
- Çapeş tribe
- Davan tribe
- Hamazkan tribe
- Izan tribe
- Keyvan tribe
- Mamyan tribe
- Mastyan tribe
- Mozdegan tribe
- Palokan tribe
- Qaçkan tribe
- Qarabas tribe
- Qaraçur tribe
- Qaraman tribe
- Reşwan tribe
- Rudkan tribe
- Sevkan tribe
- Silsepuran tribe
- Şadiyan tribe
- Şeyhkan tribe
- Şirvan tribe
- Torosan tribe
- Tukan tribe
- Zafaran tribe
- Zangalan tribe
- Zaraqkan tribe
- Zardkan tribe
- Zeydan tribe

=== Khuzestan province ===
- Sagvand tribe
- Kalhor
- Kordzangeneh

=== Kohgiluyeh and Boyerahmad Province ===
- Tilekuhi tribe

=== Kurdistan province ===
The following tribes are present in Kurdistan province:

- Ardalan tribe
- Kabudvand tribe
- Khajevand tribe
- Jaff tribe
- Mukri tribe
- Sarshiv tribe
- Tilaku'i tribe
- Zarrin-Kafsh tribe

=== Lorestan province ===
The following tribes are present in Lorestan province:

- Adinevand tribe
- Ahmedvand tribe
- Amrayi tribe
- Azadbakht tribe
- Baharvand tribe
- Chegini tribe
- Dalvand tribe
- Dilfan tribe
- Feyli tribe (refugee camp)
- Geravand tribe
- Ghiasvand tribe
- Hasanvand tribe
- Itivand tribe
- Jalilavand tribe
- Jomur tribe
- Kakavand tribe
- Kolivand tribe
- Kushki tribe
- Mirvand tribe
- Mumiavand tribe
- Musavand tribe
- Nurali tribe
- Padarvand tribe
- Romanvand tribe
- Shahivand tribe
- Tarkhan tribe
- Yousefvand tribe

=== Markazi (Arak) Province ===
- Kalhor

=== Mazandaran province ===
The following tribes are present in Mazandaran province:

- Dilfan tribe
- Khajevand tribe
- Jahanbeglu tribe
- Modan tribe

=== Qazvin province ===
The following tribes are present in Qazvin province:

- Amarlu tribe
- Chegini tribe
- Jalilavand tribe
- Reşwan tribe

=== Semnan province ===
- Pazuki

=== Sistan and Baluchistan ===
- Bijarzahi

=== Tehran province ===
The following tribes are present in Tehran province:

- Pazooki tribe
- Seilsepur

=== West Azerbaijan province ===
The following tribes are present in West Azerbaijan province:

- Bagzâdah tribe
- Bradost tribe
- Chahardoli tribe
- Dehbokri tribe
- Donboli tribe
- Fayzallahbey tribe
- Gewirk tribe
- Haydaran tribe
- Herki tribe
- Jalali tribe
- Malkari tribe
- Mamash tribe
- Mangur tribe
- Milan tribe
- Mokri tribe
- Musilyan tribe
- Piran tribe
- Shekak tribe
- Suseni tribe
- Zafaran/Zaxuran tribe
- Zerza tribe

=== Yazd province ===
- Golbaghi (Gulbaghi) tribe

=== Zanjan province ===
- Amarlu tribe
- Barghipur
- Shadlu
- Arkavazi

== Syria ==
=== Al-Hasakah and Raqqa Governorates ===
The following tribes are present in Al-Hasakah Governorate and Raqqa Governorate:

- Abajani tribe (Yezidi)
- Abasan tribe
- Adiya tribe (Yezidi)
- Afshi tribe (Yezidi)
- Aliyan tribe
- Aşitan tribe
- Bahcolan tribe (Yezidi)
- Berazi tribe
- Daqoran tribe
- Dasikan tribe (Yezidi)
- Dazwani tribe
- Dina tribe (Yezidi)
- Dorkan tribe
- Efshan tribe (Yezidi)
- Gabara tribe
- Hasenan tribe
- Hawna tribe
- Heverkan tribe
- Jabia tribe
- Kafnasa tribe (Yezidi)
- Ketikan tribe
- Khalta tribe (Yezidi)
- Kikan tribe
- Kiwakhi tribe (Yezidi)
- Koçer tribe
- Mahlami tribe
- Mahoka tribe (Yezidi)
- Marsini tribe
- Mihirkan tribe (Yezidi)
- Milan tribe
- Miran tribe
- Nimrdani tribe (Yezidi)
- Omerkan tribe
- Omeriyan tribe
- Pinar Eliya tribe
- Semoqa tribe (Yezidi)
- Shifaqta tribe (Yezidi)
- Sharqi tribe (Yezidi)
- Şêxan tribe
- Taqa tribe (Yezidi)

=== Aleppo Governorate ===
The following tribes are present in Aleppo Governorate:

- Aleddin tribe
- Amkan tribe
- Berazi tribe
- Biyan tribe
- Çêlka tribe (Yezidi)
- Cûmiyan tribe
- Dawudiya tribe (Yezidi)
- Dimili tribe
- Dinadi tribe (Yezidi)
- Heyştiyan tribe
- Qopani tribe (Yezidi)
- Reşwan tribe
- Reşkan tribe (Yezidi)
- Rûbariyan tribe
- Sheriqan tribe (Yezidi)
- Şêxan tribe
- Xaltî tribe (Yezidi)
- Xastiyan tribe
- Xerzan tribe

== Turkey ==
=== Adıyaman Province ===
The following tribes are present in Adıyaman Province:

- Alikan tribe
- Atman tribe
- Balyan tribe
- Belikan tribe
- Bêzikan tribe
- Birîmşa tribe
- Bîstikan tribe
- Canbegan tribe
- Cêlikan tribe
- Dêrsimî tribe
- Dirêjan tribe
- Gewozî tribe
- Hevêdan tribe
- Heyderan tribe
- Hûriyan tribe
- Izol tribe
- Kawî tribe
- Kerdizan tribe
- Kîkan tribe
- Kirvar tribe
- Mirdesan tribe
- Molikan tribe
- Mukriyan tribe
- Pîrvan tribe
- Reşwan tribe
- Şavak tribe
- Sinemilli tribe
- Sînanka tribe
- Şêxbizin tribe
- Teşikan tribe
- Ziran tribe

=== Ağrı Province ===
The following tribes are present in Ağrı Province and are all Shafi'i:

- Berjeri tribe
- Jalali tribe
- Hasenan tribe
- Haydaran tribe
- Memani tribe
- Zilan tribe

=== Aksaray Province ===
The following tribes are present in Aksaray Province:

- Ekecik/Keşan tribe
- Reşwan tribe

=== Ankara Province ===
The following tribes are present in Ankara Province:

- Atman tribe
- Davdan tribe
- Canbegan tribe
- Bezikan tribe
- Biliki tribe
- Hecibi tribe
- Kîkan tribe
- Modan tribe
- Reşwan tribe
- Sawiki tribe
- Şêxan tribe
- Şexbizin tribe
- Rutan tribe
- Têrikan tribe
- Zirkan tribe

=== Ardahan Province ===
The following tribes are present in Ardahan Province:

- Bezikan tribe
- Cemaldînî tribe
- Kaskan tribe
- Sipkan tribe
- Pîrebadî tribe
- Zîlan tribe

=== Batman Province ===
The following tribes are present in Batman Province:

- Alikan tribe
- Barava/Derhawî tribe
- Bekiran tribe
- Bozikan tribe
- Celali tribe
- Daşi tribe
- Dermemikan tribe
- Etmanekî tribe
- Habezbenî tribe
- Hesar tribe
- Kercoz tribe
- Remman tribe
- Reşkotan tribe
- Seyyid tribe
- Sinikan tribe
- Timok tribe
- Xiyan tribe
- Zilan tribe

=== Bingöl Province ===
The following tribes are present in Bingöl Province:

- Abdalan tribe
- Axmur tribe
- Az tribe
- Began tribe
- Bekiran tribe
- Beritan tribe
- Bilice tribe
- Botikan tribe
- Canbegan tribe
- Cibran tribe
- Çolemêrgan tribe
- Çanmerik tribe
- Çarekan tribe
- Çikan tribe
- Emeran tribe
- Giransor tribe
- Gokdere tribe
- Hasenan tribe
- Izol tribe
- Karsan tribe
- Karabaş tribe
- Kurêşan tribe
- Lolan tribe
- Maksudan tribe
- Maskan tribe
- Musyan tribe
- Omeran tribe
- Pox tribe
- Remman tribe
- Şadiyan tribe
- Seter tribe
- Solaxan tribe
- Şêxleran tribe
- Tavus tribe
- Xilan tribe
- Xormekan tribe
- Zikte tribe

=== Bitlis Province ===
The following tribes are present in Bitlis Province:

- Alikan tribe
- Balekan tribe
- Bekiran tribe
- Dimilî tribe
- Dûdêran tribe
- Etmanekî tribe
- Geydan tribe
- Keşkoliyan tribe
- Mamediyan tribe
- Mamxuran tribe
- Motikan tribe
- Silokan tribe

=== Black Sea and Marmara Regions ===
The following tribes are present in the Black Sea Region and Marmara Region:

- Canbegan tribe (in Amasya Province, Çorum Province and Tokat Province)
- Kawî tribe (in Çorum Province)
- Reşwan tribe (in Çorum Province)
- Şeyhhasan tribe (in Giresun Province)
- Şêxbizin tribe (in Amasya Province, Çorum Province, Düzce Province, Samsun Province, Sinop Province and Tokat Province)

=== Diyarbakır Province ===
The following tribes are present in Diyarbakır Province and are all Shafi'i:

- Bekirhan tribe
- Bedikan tribe
- Çaruma tribe
- Dodikan tribe
- Hancuk tribe
- Hasani tribe
- Hevedan tribe
- Hiyan tribe
- Izol tribe
- Keşko tribe
- Kulp tribe
- Mendan tribe
- Narik tribe
- Omeran tribe
- Paşur tribe
- Peçari tribe
- Şeyhdoda tribe
- Zahori tribe

=== Elazığ Province ===
The following tribes are present in Elazığ Province and are all Hanafi unless noted:

- Balyan tribe
- Beritan tribe (Hanafi and Shafi'i)
- Bulanik tribe
- Direjan tribe
- Genmutlu tribe
- Gökdere tribe
- Izol tribe
- Herdi tribe
- Karabegyan tribe
- Karaçor tribe
- Kasiman tribe
- Milan tribe
- Oşin tribe
- Parçikan tribe
- Sivan tribe
- Şadiyan tribe
- Şavak tribe
- Sinemilli tribe (Alevi)
- Zeyve tribe
- Zirkan tribe

=== Erzincan Province ===
The following tribes are present in Erzincan Province:

- Abasan tribe
- Alan tribe
- Arel tribe
- Aşuran tribe
- Atman tribe
- Balaban tribe
- Balan tribe
- Bamasoran tribe
- Botikan tribe
- Bilbas tribe
- Çarekan tribe
- Derviş Cemal tribe
- Karikan tribe
- Keçelan tribe
- Keman tribe
- Koçgiri tribe
- Kurêşan tribe
- Kurmeş tribe
- Lolan tribe
- Menikan tribe
- Rutan tribe
- Sinemili tribe
- Sisan tribe
- Şadiyan tribe
- Şêx Mehmedan tribe
- Xormekan tribe
- Zilan tribe

=== Erzurum Province ===
The following tribes are present in Erzurum Province:

- Balaban tribe
- Belican tribe
- Belikan tribe
- Cibran tribe
- Çarekan tribe
- Dilxêran tribe
- Dimilî tribe
- Hasenan tribe
- Sevkar tribe
- Şadiyan tribe
- Şexbizin tribe
- Xormekan tribe
- Zerikan tribe

=== Gaziantep Province ===
The following tribes are present in Gaziantep Province and are all Hanafi unless noted:

- Atman tribe (Alevi)
- Celikan tribe
- Delikan tribe
- Reşwan tribe

=== Greater Kars Provinces ===
The following tribes are present in Kars Province and Iğdır Province (one province until 1993) and are all Shafi'i unless noted:

- Adaman tribe
- Azizan tribe (Hanafi)
- Badikan tribe (Hanafi)
- Badiiyan tribe (Hanafi)
- Banoki tribe
- Beboyi tribe
- Bekiran tribe
- Belhikan tribe
- Bezkan tribe (Hanafi)
- Birmiyan tribe (Hanafi)
- Burukan tribe (Hanafi and Shafi'i)
- Cemaldin tribe (Hanafi and Shafi'i)
- Cibran tribe (Hanafi)
- Cunikan tribe (Alevi, Hanafi)
- Dilxêran tribe (Hanafi and Shafi'i)
- Elya tribe
- Gaskan tribe (Hanafi and Shafi'i)
- Gavasyan tribe
- Goran tribe (Hanafi)
- Haciyani tribe
- Halikan tribe
- Hiloğlu tribe
- Jalali tribe (Hanafi)
- Kalkan tribe
- Kaskil tribe
- Keskoyi tribe
- Koskan tribe (Hanafi)
- Kurtkan tribe
- Lolan tribe (Alevi)
- Malbat tribe
- Milyan tribe (Hanafi)
- Mirdesan tribe (Hanafi)
- Pirebat tribe (Hanafi and Shafi'i)
- Retkan tribe (Hanafi and Shafi'i)
- Sakan tribe
- Seydoyan tribe (Hanafi)
- Sipkan tribe
- Suleyman tribe
- Şemsikan tribe
- Telfesan tribe (Hanafi)

=== Gümüşhane Province ===
The following tribes are present in Gümüşhane Province and are all Alevi:

- Abasan tribe
- Abdalan tribe
- Arel tribe
- Butkan tribe
- Kurêşan tribe
- Lolan tribe
- Şadiyan tribe
- Şeyhhasan tribe
- Xormekan tribe

=== Hakkâri Province ===
The following tribes are present in Hakkâri Province:

- Begzade tribe
- Diri tribe
- Doski tribe
- Ertuşi tribe
- Gerdî tribe
- Gewdan tribe
- Giravî tribe
- Goyan tribe
- Herkî tribe
- Humara tribe
- Jirkî tribe
- Mamxûran tribe
- Oramar tribe
- Pinyanişî tribe
- Qeşûran tribe
- Silehi tribe
- Zerzan tribe

=== Kahramanmaraş Province ===
The following tribes are present in Kahramanmaraş Province:

- Alxas tribe
- Atman tribe
- Bugan tribe
- Canbegan tribe
- Celikan tribe
- Cimikan tribe
- Harunan tribe
- Kasiman tribe
- Kiliçli tribe
- Koçgiri tribe
- Kurecik tribe
- Kurne tribe
- Pilvankan tribe
- Sinemilli tribe
- Şadiyan tribe
- Şemsikan tribe
- Xidiran tribe

=== Kayseri Province ===
The following tribes are present in Kayseri Province:

- Alxas tribe
- Bekiran tribe
- Canbeg tribe
- Giniyan tribe
- Harunan tribe
- Karabal tribe
- Koçgiri tribe
- Kumreş tribe
- Sinemilli tribe
- Şemsikan tribe

=== Kilis Province ===
The following tribes are present in Kilis Province and are all Hanafi:

- Delikan tribe

=== Kırşehir Province ===
The following tribes are present in Kırşehir Province:

- Bêrketî tribe
- Molikan tribe
- Oxçiyan tribe
- Pisiyan tribe
- Reşwan tribe
- Şêxbilan tribe
- Şexbizin tribe

=== Konya Province ===
The following tribes are present in Konya Province:

- Canbegan tribe
- Celikan tribe
- Cudikan tribe
- Molikan tribe
- Omeran tribe
- Reşwan tribe
- Sewêdi tribe
- Sêfkan tribe
- Şexbizin tribe
- Têrikan tribe
- Xelikan tribe

=== Malatya Province ===
The following tribes are present in Malatya Province:

- Aluç tribe
- Atman tribe
- Balyan tribe
- Canbeg tribe
- Direjan tribe
- Herdi tribe
- Izol tribe
- Kurecik tribe
- Molikan tribe
- Parçikan tribe
- Reşwan tribe
- Sinemilli tribe
- Sînanka tribe
- Zeyve tribe

=== Mardin Province ===
The following tribes are present in Mardin Province:

- Abasan tribe
- Alikan tribe
- Aluwa tribe
- Arbanî tribe
- Arnas tribe
- Basiqil tribe
- Barava/Derhawî tribe
- Botikan tribe
- Bubilan tribe
- Celali tribe
- Çomeran tribe
- Dasikan tribe
- Dakoran tribe
- Dekşori tribe
- Dera tribe
- Dêreverî tribe
- Dermemikan tribe
- Domanan tribe
- Dorikan tribe
- Dimilî tribe
- Erebiyan tribe
- Gergerî tribe
- Habezbenî tribe
- Harunan tribe
- Hasenan tribe
- Hemika tribe
- Heramî tribe
- Hevêrkan tribe
- Kasikan tribe
- Kîkan tribe
- Koçekan tribe
- Lêf tribe
- Mamûdan tribe
- Meman tribe
- Meşkinan tribe
- Metinan tribe
- Milan tribe
- Omerkan tribe
- Qelenderan tribe
- Raman tribe
- Rutan tribe
- Salihan tribe
- Sefan tribe
- Selikan tribe
- Sinikan tribe
- Sorkan tribe
- Surgucu tribe
- Şeb tribe
- Şemikan tribe
- Şêxan tribe
- Temikan tribe
- Tepêbarava tribe
- Xalecan tribe
- Xurs tribe
- Zaxuran tribe

=== Muş Province ===
The following tribes are present in Muş Province and are all Shafi'i unless noted:

- Abdalan tribe
- Badikan tribe
- Bekiran tribe
- Bonaki tribe
- Bozikan tribe
- Cibran tribe
- Çeçen tribe (see Chechen Kurds, Hanafi and Shafi'i)
- Çerek tribe (Hanafi and Shafi'i)
- Çukur tribe
- Elmali tribe
- Halefbey tribe
- Hasenan tribe
- Haydaran tribe
- Heridi tribe
- Hiyan tribe
- Hizan tribe
- Huyut tribe
- Jalali tribe
- Lezgi tribe (Hanafi and Shafi'i)
- Lolan tribe (Alevi)
- Parsink tribe
- Rektan tribe
- Savdan tribe
- Top tribe
- Zamanağa tribe

=== Siirt Province ===
The following tribes are present in Siirt Province and are all Shafi'i:

- Adiyan tribe
- Alikan tribe
- Bekiran tribe
- Dûdêran tribe
- Erebiyan tribe
- Garisan tribe
- Keşkoliyan tribe
- Mamediyan tribe
- Pencenarî tribe
- Silokan tribe
- Soran tribe
- Şakiran tribe
- Sturkiyan tribe

=== Sivas Province ===
The following tribes are present in Sivas Province:

- Alxas tribe
- Atman tribe
- Bulucan tribe
- Canbegan tribe
- Celikan tribe
- Çarekan tribe
- Çuxraş tribe
- Direjan tribe
- Giniyan tribe
- Koçgiri tribe
- Kurecik tribe
- Kurmeş tribe
- Kurne tribe
- Sinemilli tribe
- Şadiyan tribe
- Şemsikan tribe
- Xormekan tribe

=== Şanlıurfa Province ===
The following tribes are present in Şanlıurfa Province:

- Acem tribe
- Badilli tribe
- Bezikan tribe
- Bucak tribe
- Canbegan tribe
- Delikan tribe
- Dodikan tribe
- Hartavi tribe
- Izol tribe
- Karahan tribe
- Karakeçili tribe
- Kawî tribe
- Kejan tribe
- Ketikan tribe
- Kirvar tribe
- Mersavi tribe
- Milan tribe
- Mirdesan tribe
- Modan tribe
- Pijan tribe
- Reşwan tribe
- Sinikan tribe
- Suleyman tribe
- Şabikan tribe
- Şeddadî tribe
- Şêxan tribe
- Terikan tribe

=== Şırnak Province ===
The following tribes are present in Şırnak Province:

- Alikan
- Aluwa
- Amara
- Bajarî
- Batûyan/Botikan
- Dêrşewî
- Domanan
- Dorikan
- Dûdêran
- Garîstan
- Gewdan
- Giravî
- Girkê Emo
- Giteyî
- Goyan
- Harûnan
- Hecî Eliya
- Hêsinan
- Jirkî
- Jîlyan
- Kîçan
- Mamxûran
- Meman
- Mîran
- Mûsareşan
- Omerkan
- Qeşûran
- Salihan
- Sindî
- Sipêrti
- Soran
- Şikakî
- Şirnexî
- Tayan
- Welatî
- Xêrikan
- Zedkan
- Zeherî
- Zêvkî

=== Tunceli Province ===
The following tribes are present in Tunceli Province:

- Abasan tribe
- Alan tribe
- Arel tribe
- Aslanan tribe
- Aşuran tribe
- Bahtiyaran tribe
- Balaban tribe
- Balan tribe
- Beyitan tribe
- Birman tribe
- Çarekan tribe
- Demenan tribe
- Ferhadan tribe
- Haydaran tribe
- Hiran tribe
- Izol tribe
- Kalan tribe
- Keman tribe
- Karabal tribe
- Karsan tribe
- Keçelan tribe
- Kirgan tribe
- Kurêşan tribe
- Laçin tribe
- Lolan tribe
- Maksudan tribe
- Pilvankan tribe
- Qoçan tribe
- Rutan tribe
- Sisan tribe
- Sûran tribe
- Şadiyan tribe
- Şavak tribe
- Şavalan tribe
- Şêx Mehmedan tribe
- Xormekan tribe
- Yusufan tribe

=== Van Province ===
The following tribes are present in Van Province and are all Shafi'i:

- Adaman tribe
- Alan tribe
- Asiyan tribe
- Buriki tribe
- Botan tribe
- Ertuşi tribe
- Ezdinan tribe
- Geloi tribe
- Hacidiran tribe
- Haydaran tribe
- Kurêşan tribe
- Manhuran tribe
- Meleyan tribe
- Memani tribe
- Milan tribe
- Pinyaniş tribe
- Shekak tribe
- Şemsikan tribe
- Takuri tribe

== Historical tribes ==
- Bejnewi tribe (see Emirate of Hasankeyf)
- Hasenan tribe (Hakan Fidan)
- Beşneviye tribe (see Principality of Eğil)
- Hadhabani tribe
- Humeydiye tribe (see Principality of Eğil)
- Mahmudi tribe
- Qaymarriya tribe
- Shabankara tribe
- Shirwi tribe (see Emirate of Hasankeyf)
- 'Ishaniya or Aishan Tribe
- Barzikani tribe
- Shadhanjan or Shādhanjānī
- Daseni or Dasiniyya tribe
- Hakkari tribe
- Zerzar or Zirzariyya
- Humaydi tribe
- Tayrahi

== Bibliography ==
- Towfiq, F. (1987), "ʿAŠĀYER", Encyclopedia Iranica, vol. II, pp. 707–724
- Akbulut, Yılmaz (1995), Bingöl tarihi (in Turkish), Kültür Bakanlığı, ISBN 978-975-17-1473-2
- Aksüt, Hamza (2012), Aleviler: Türkiye, İran, İrak, Suriye, Bulgaristan (5 ed.), Ankara: Yurt, ISBN 978-975-9025-61-8
- Andrews, Peter; Benninghaus, Rüdiger (2002), Ethnic Groups in the Republic of Turkey: Supplement and Index, Reichert, ISBN 978-3-89500-229-8
- Bozkurt, Ibrahim (2021), Aşiretler Tarihi, Istanbul: Nûbihar, ISBN 978-625-7383-07-3
- Çakar, Enver (2013), Osmanlı Döneminde Harput'ta Kırsal Yerleşme: Baskil Örneği (PDF) (in Turkish), Fırat University
- Çakar, Enver (2019), 19. yüzyılın ilk yarısında keban köylerinin idari ve demografik yapısı (PDF) (in Turkish)
- Bulut, Faik (2013), Dersim Raporları (5 ed.), Evrensel
- Kılıç, Ömer (2017), Uygarlık Tarihinde Çermik
- Oncu, Mehmet (2019), Ferhenga devoka herêma Semsûrê, Sîtav, ISBN 978-605-7920-60-7
- Öçal, Serdar (2016), Awayê Lêkirina Navan li. Herêma Dêrikê (Lêkolîneke Onomastîk-Sosyolojîk)
- Öçal, Serdar (2020), "Navên Jîngeh û Teşeyên Erdnîgarî li Herêma Dêrikê (Lêkolîneka Onomastîk", Folklor û Ziman
- Soane, E. B. (1918), Notes on the tribes of Southern Kurdistan, Baghdad: Government Press
- Turkish state (2014), Aşiretler Raporu (in Turkish) (3 ed.), Kaynak Yayınları, ISBN 978-975-343-220-7
- Tan, Altan (2018), Turabidin'den Berriye'ye. Aşiretler – Dinler – Diller – Kültürler (in Turkish), Pak Ajans Yayincilik Turizm Ve Diş Ticaret Limited şirketi, ISBN 978-9944-360-94-4
- Uslu, Emrullah (2009), The Transformation of Kurdish Political Identity in Turkey: Impact of Modernization, Democratization and Globalization, pp. 75–, ISBN 978-1-109-05548-1
