= Aziz Khan Mokri =

Iranian commander-in-chief of the army from 1853 to 1857

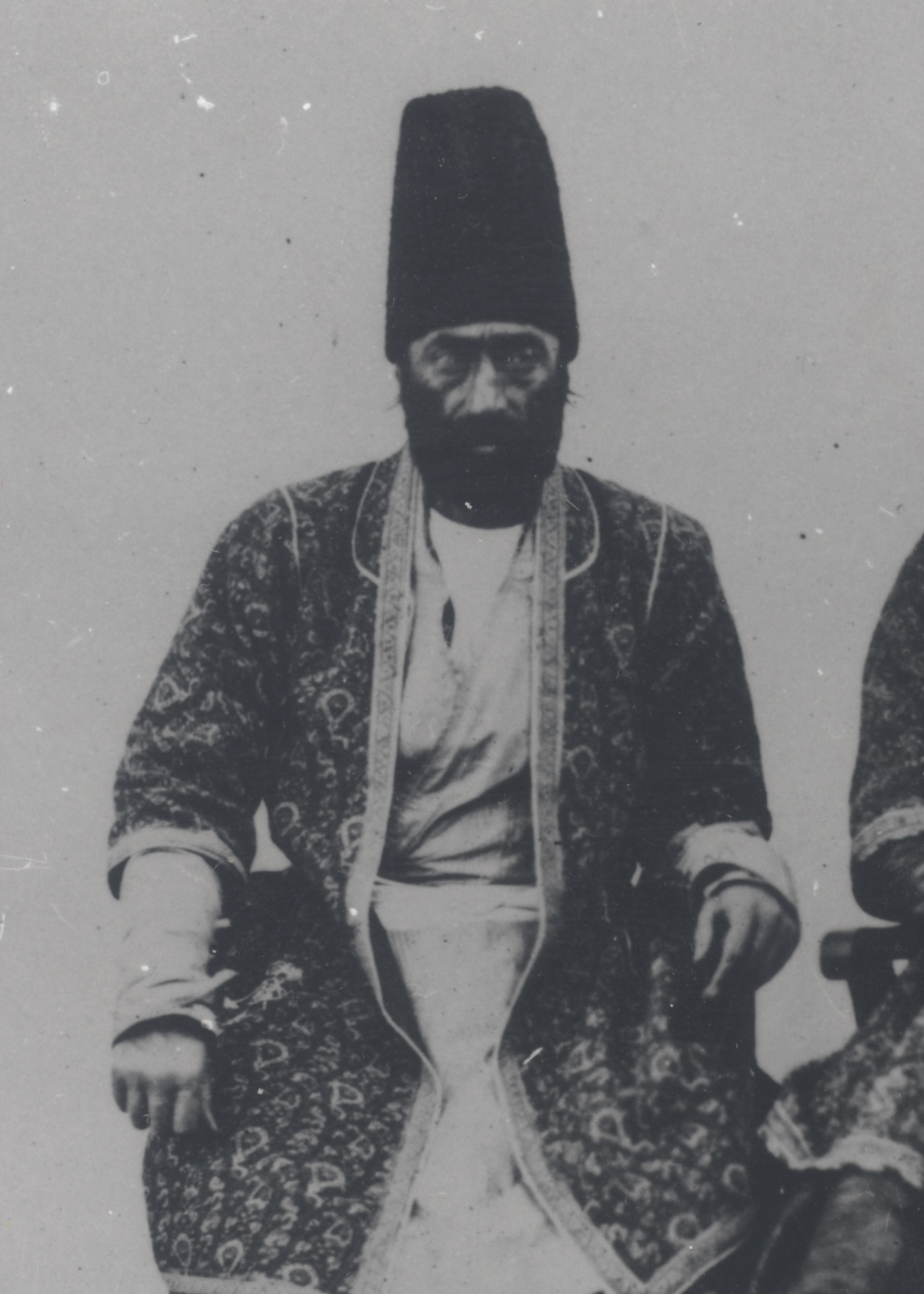
- Aziz Khan Mokri (cropped) with Farrokh Khan, Golestan Palace Library

Minister of War
- In office 1866–1868
- Monarch: Naser al-Din Shah Qajar
- Preceded by: Mirza Mohammad Khan Sepahsalar
- Succeeded by: Firuz Mirza

Personal details
- Born: 1792 Sardasht, Iran
- Died: 11 January 1871 (aged 79) Tabriz, Qajar Iran
- Resting place: Near the Imamzadeh Hamzah, Tabriz
- Relations: Mohammad Khan (father); Sayf al-Din Khan (son); Ali Khan (son)

Military service
- Rank: Commander-in-chief
- Battles/wars: Siege of Herat (1837–1838)

Aziz Khan Mokri (also spelled Aziz Khan Mukri; Persian: عزیزخان مکری, Sorani Kurdish: عه‌زیز خان موکری; 1792 – 1871) was an Iranian military officer and grandee, who occupied high offices under the Qajar shah Naser al-Din Shah (r. 1834–1896). He served as the commander-in-chief of the army from 1853 to 1857.

A native of Sardasht, Aziz Khan belonged to the Kurdish Mokri tribe. He spent his early career in the sixth regiment (fawj-e sheshom) of Azerbaijan, which he led as sarhang during the siege of Herat in 1837–1839. Dismissed for some time following his unsuccessful endeavors in the Herat operation, Aziz Khan was later appointed the consultant of Fars. There he eventually rose up to the position of sarhang of the fourth regiment of Tabriz, which was stationed in Fars. On 8 August 1853, Aziz Khan was promoted to sardar-e koll-e asaker (commander-in-chief of the army).

Aziz Khan later became a victim of the machinations of the grand vizier Mirza Aqa Khan Nuri, and was a result dismissed by the shah on 13 June 1857. Following Mirza Aqa Khan's dismissal on 30 August 1858, Aziz Khan was restored to his former rank and given authority in Azerbaijan, becoming the pishkar (general manager) of the wali (governor-general) Bahram Mirza.

Aziz Khan died at Tabriz on 11 January 1871, where he is today buried near the Imamzadeh Hamzah.

== Background ==
An ethnic Kurd, Aziz Khan was born in 1792 in Sardasht in northwestern Iran. He was the son of Mohammad Khan (also known as Mohammad Soltan), who was the sardar of the Baba Miri family of the Mokri tribe. Details regarding Aziz Khan's youth are obscure.

== Rise ==
Due to Aziz Khan's ability to read and write, as well having a good handwriting, he joined the sixth regiment (fawj-e sheshom) of Azerbaijan at Tabriz. He later led this regiment as its sarhang during the Iranian siege of Herat in 1837–1839. Acting as the representant of the Qajar shah Mohammad Shah (r. 1834–1848), Aziz Khan spent two days in fruitless negotiations with the Afghan ruler of Herat, Kamran Mirza Durrani, and his vizier Yar Muhammad Khan Alakozai. Following his Herat operation, Aziz Khan was deprived of any important political duty.

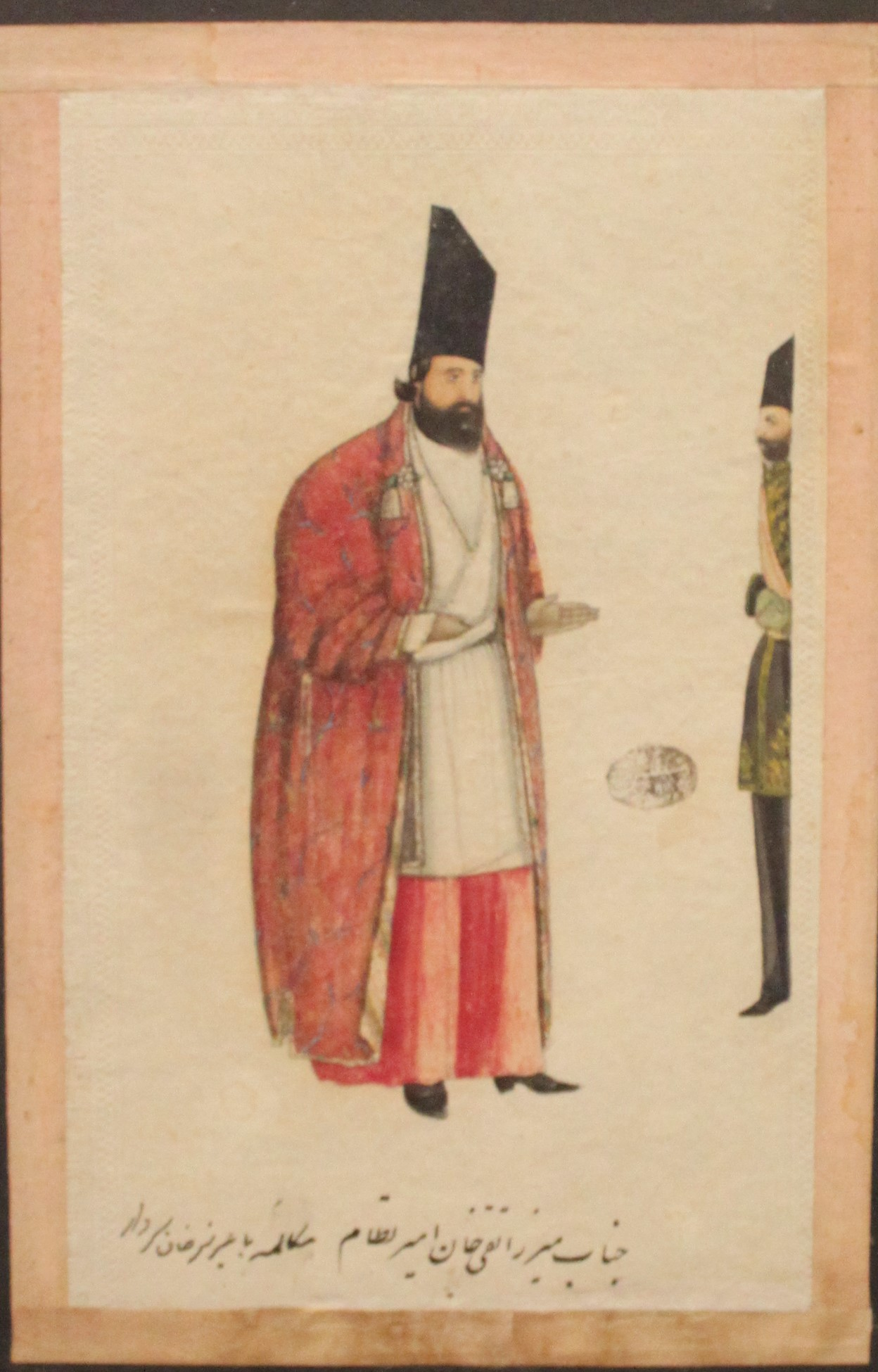
Amir Kabir discussing with Aziz Khan. Painted by Abu'l-Hasan Sani al-Mulk in c. 1850

In 1840/1, Mohammad Shah sent Mirza Nabi Khan Qazvini to Fars to take charge of its affairs, since its inhabitants had rebelled against Fereydun Mirza Farmanfarma. At the suggestion of Mirza Nazar-Ali Hakim-bashi, Nabi Khan had taken Aziz Khan with him as a consultant (rish-safid). They both returned to Fars later in 1843. Although Nabi Khan was succeeded by Hossein Khan Ajudanbashi as the governor of Fars the following year, Aziz Khan remained consultant through the support of Hakim-bashi. Ajudanbashi, who knew Aziz Khan from Tabriz, appointed him as his consultant, then tahwildar and later sarhang of the fourth regiment of Tabriz, which was stationed in Fars. Aziz Khan continued to serve under Ajudanbashi until Mohammad Shah's death in September 1848.

Following the succession of Mohammad Shah's son Naser al-Din Shah and his appointment of Mirza Taqi Khan Amir Nezam (later known as Amir Kabir) as grand vizier in October 1848, the inhabitants of the city of Shiraz in Fars rebelled against Ajudanbashi. Aziz Khan played a vital role as the mediator between the conflicting sides. This prompted Amir Kabir to acknowledge Aziz Khan's importance and appoint him as the Ajudan-Bashi (adjutant) despite his unfriendly relations with Aziz Khan's patrons, Ajudanbashi and Hakim-bashi. According to the modern historian J. Calmard, Amir Kabir's support was crucial for Aziz Khan's future rise to power due to the latter's Sunni and modest background.

During the Babi revolt of 1850–1851 in Zanjan led by Hujjat, Amir Kabir sent Aziz Khan to suppress the revolt, as well as an envoy to the Russian-controlled city of Yerevan, where Prince Alexander Pavlovitch was quelling a local revolt. After having his attempt to both negotiate and then attack the Babis thwarted, Aziz Khan left the commander of the Zanjan forces, Mohammad Khan Amir Tuman, to deal with them, and instead went to Yerevan, where he was well received. When Aziz Khan returned to the capital of Tehran on 12 March 1851, he was given a friendly reception with Naser al-Din Shah.

While Naser al-Din Shah was travelling to Persian Iraq along with Amir Kabir (from May to October 1851), Aziz Khan served as the commander of the army and the fortress at Tehran. Aziz Khan's son Ali Khan was soon appointed the new chief of the newly established police force in Tehran. After the death of the director of the Dar ul-Funun college, Mirza Mohammad-Ali Khan Shirazi on 10 February 1852, Aziz Khan succeeded him. Occupying the office for only a few months, Aziz Khan seemingly did not make much of an impact on the administration of the college or its well-being.

Later in the same year, Aziz Khan personally arranged the execution of Táhirih, an influential figure in the newly established Bábi Faith. Although Aziz Khan had hostile relations with the new grand vizier Mirza Aqa Khan Nuri (appointed in 1851), he had become well-versed in political survival, and as a result succeeded getting promoted to sardar-e koll-e asaker (commander-in-chief of the army) on 8 August 1853. During the same month, Aziz Khan had an "impressive military parade" arranged for Naser al-Din Shah at Soltaniyeh.

== First term as commander-in-chief ==
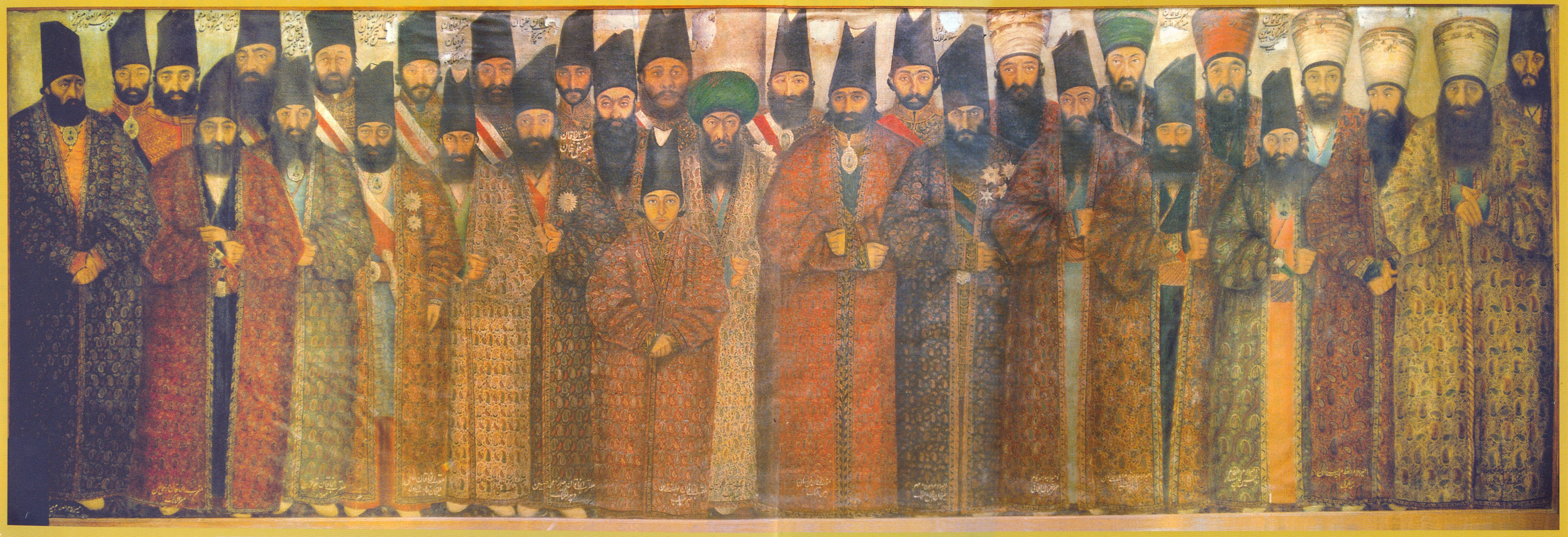
The Nezamiyeh Hall Panel, which depicts many dignitaries under Naser al-Din Shah (r. 1834–1896), including Aziz Khan, who is second from the left. Painted in c. 1856 by Sani al-Molk

In 1853/4, Naser al-Din Shah agreed to help the Russians against the Ottomans in the Crimean War. However, neither he nor Mirza Aqa Khan were able, or inclined to embrace a pro-Russian policy. Both the army led by Aziz Khan to the Iranian–Ottoman border at Azerbaijan, and the army sent to the border at Kermanshah, were unsuccessful. In the same year, Aziz Khan was appointed the interim governor of Azerbaijan until the new governor appeared.

Aziz Khan had a close alliance with Jeyran, a favourite wife of Naser al-Din Shah. With her support, Aziz Khan attempted to stage a coup against Mirza Aqa Khan. He was supported by some Kurdish regiments, as well as some influential dignitaries, such as Mirza Yusuf Ashtiani, who had lost his office of accountant general to Mirza Aqa Khan's son Kazim Khan Nizam al-Mulk. In June 1857, Aziz Khan and the rest of the conspirators compiled a list of Mirza Aqa Khan's "miseeds", which was to be given by Jeyran to Naser al-Din Shah as proof of Mirza Aqa Khan's subversion.

However, at the last moment she removed the most harmful charges from the list, thus only disclosing enough for Naser al-Din Shah to raise his suspicion. She had possibly done this to make a deal with Mirza Aqa Khan to secure her sons nomination as heir apparent. They soon made a deal that Mirza Aqa Khan would secure her sons nomination, while Jeyran in exchange agreed to hide the most harmful charges in list as well give him the names of the conspirators. In order to protect his position, Mirza Aqa Khan started scheming against Aziz Khan, which eventually led to his dismissal by the shah on 13 June 1857. His dismissal was made official during a court ceremony by Ali Khan Maragha'i, who had supervised the execution of Amir Kabir in 1852. However, Aziz Khan was not charged with anything specific.

Aziz Khan was imprisoned and made to defend his actions during his four-year administration in Tabriz. In August or September 1857, he was exiled to Sardasht. Nevertheless, Mirza Aqa Khan continued to cause him problems, summoning him to Tabriz to prosecute and aggravate him.

== Later life and death ==
After Naser al-Din Shah had dismissed Mirza Aqa Khan from his office on 30 August 1858, he restored Aziz Khan's rank and gave him authority in Azerbaijan, appointing him the pishkar (general manager) of the wali (governor-general) Bahram Mirza. Aziz Khan was also part of the cabinet at Tehran 1859/60. Following the assignment of the governorship of Azerbaijan to the crown prince Mozaffar ad-Din Mirza in 1860/61, Aziz Khan succeeded him as the minister of war and head of the armed forces, but lost his pishkar office.

Aziz Khan was reinstated as the pishkar of Azerbaijan in 1870/71, but he was by then old and sluggish, unable to handle the courtiers of Mozaffar ad-Din Mirza. He died at Tabriz on 11 January 1871, where he is buried near the Imamzadeh Hamzah. Naser al-Din Shah was reportedly saddened when he heard of Aziz Khan's death.

== Legacy and assessment ==
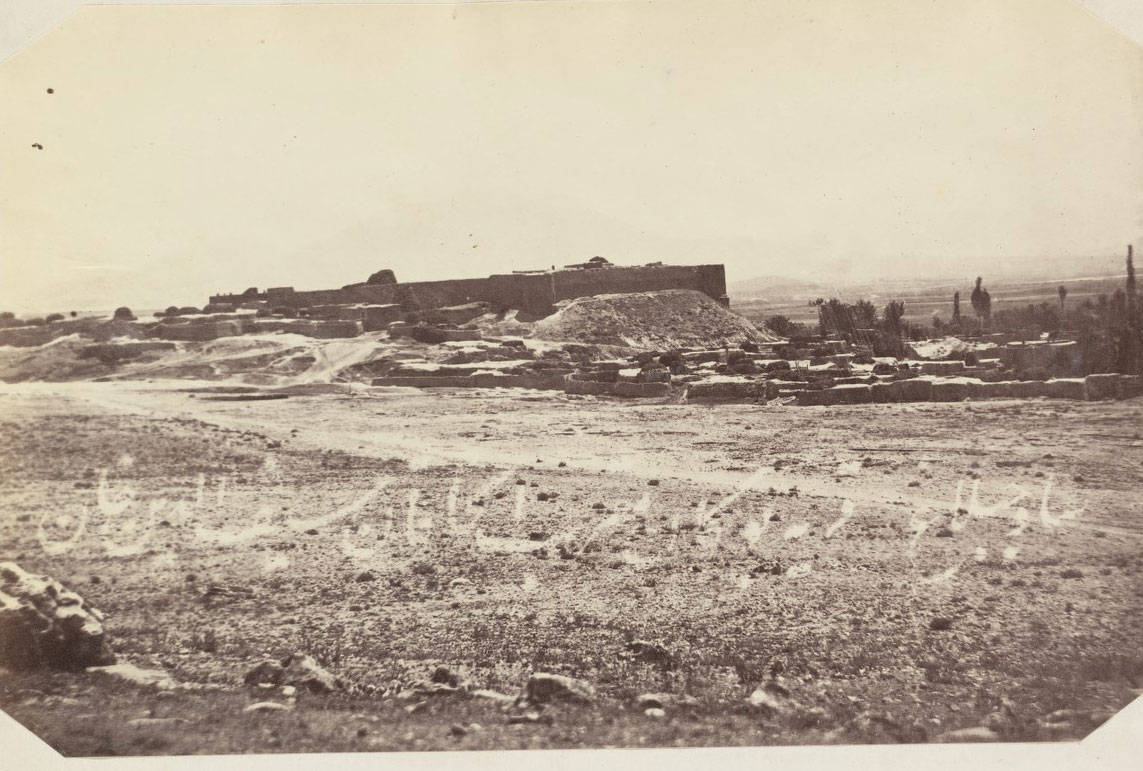
Bukan – Sardar Azizkhan Mokri Castle in 1887

Aziz Khan was survived by three sons, whom he had with a daughter of Amir Kabir. One of Aziz Khan's sons, Sayf al-Din Khan (died 1891/2), became the leader of the Mokris and also served as the governor of Savojbolagh multiple times. He was succeeded by his son Hossein Khan, who was killed during an Ottoman attack on Savojbolag in 1914. The Chahar-rah-e Aziz Khan square in the Arg neighbourhood in Tehran is named after Aziz Khan, as it was part of his residence.

The English orientalist and diplomat Edward Eastwick, who saw Aziz Khan in Tabriz in September of 1860, recounts him as "a large brawny man, with bloodshot eyes, and inflamed features... he had lately walled up fourteen robbers, two of them with their heads downward, and so left them to perish".

The contemporary Iranian historian and geographer Mirza Ja'far Haqayeqnegar Khormuji (died 1883) commended Aziz Khan for his "sense of justice and chivalrous qualities".

== Sources ==
- Algar, H. (1989). "Amīr Kabīr, Mīrzā Taqī Khan". In Yarshater, Ehsan (ed.). Encyclopædia Iranica. Vol. III: Ātaš–Bayhaqī, Ẓahīr-al-Dīn. London and New York: Routledge & Kegan Paul. pp. 959–963. ISBN 978-0-71009-121-5.
- Amanat, Abbas (1997). Pivot of the Universe: Nasir Al-Din Shah Qajar and the Iranian Monarchy, 1831-1896. I.B.Tauris. ISBN 978-1845118280.
- Calmard, J. (1988). "ʿAzīz Khan Mokrī". In Yarshater, Ehsan (ed.). Encyclopædia Iranica. Vol. III/3: Azerbaijan IV–Bačča(-ye) Saqqā. London and New York: Routledge & Kegan Paul. pp. 261–263. ISBN 978-0-71009-115-4.
- Gurney, John; Nabavi, Negin (1993). "Dār al-fonūn". In Yarshater, Ehsan (ed.). Encyclopædia Iranica. Vol. VI/6: Daf(f) and Dāyera–Dārā. London and New York: Routledge & Kegan Paul. pp. 662–668. ISBN 978-1-56859-004-2.
