= Mangur (tribe) =

Major Kurdish tribe

Mangur is one of the largest Kurdish tribes of northwestern Iran and has a minor presence in northern Iraq. Historically semi-nomadic and war-like, they are native to a basin on the little Zab river called “Mangurayeti” in Mukriyan and also inhabit the districts and cities of Sardasht, Piranshahr, Mahabad, and Pshdar District, the latter of which is in Iraq and not considered to be a part of the geo-cultural region of Mukriyan.

Mangur was one of the Kurdish tribes in the Bilbas federation. The others were Mâmash, Piran, Zerzâ, Herki and Shekâk.

== Sub-tribes ==
Mangur households were typically named after their founding patriarch’s mother. This made most Mangur families patrilineal-matronymic as they were surnamed after a paternal grandmother.

The Mangurs are divided in six main different matronymic sub-tribes based on, and named after, their respective foremother. The relationship between these six ancestral mothers is vague and unclear though traditionally they are believed to be either sister-wives or biological sisters. The clan names are as follows:

- Amān
- Šamʿ
- Zīn
- Zarrīn
- Ḵeder
- Morowwat

The 'Amān,' 'Šamʿ,' 'Zīn,' 'Zarrīn,' and 'Ḵeder' clans are mostly based in Piranshahr and Sardasht while the 'Morowwat' clan is based in Mahabad. The largest of these sub-tribes is the 'Morowwat' clan. Historically, these sub-tribes acted as their own tribe and were constantly at war with each other and were disunited.

== History ==
In the winter of 1928-29 the Mangur, the Mâmash and other tribes rebelled against Reza Shah and occupied Sardasht though they lacked the forces to extend the revolt more widely. The Mangur were among the tribes to initially back the Soviet-backed Republic of Mahabad in 1946. However support for the republic soon fell after the withdrawal of Russia. The Mangur Tribe, and other surrounding tribes withdrew their support.

Pre-marital romance was tolerated by the Mangurs, as well as other Bilbas tribes, although it was almost always expected the couple soon formally marry or elope. This caused conflict with the surrounding settled-feudalistic Mokri tribe, whom measured a woman's honor in “delicacy and modesty” rather than “strength and stubbornness,” who promoted the ban of this practice. Bilbas first-time brides were also notably older than first-time brides of surrounding tribes. The Mangurs were of the last Kurdish tribes to practice this tradition, continuing the practice until the 1980s.

The Mangur were notorious for banditry and raiding. Female Mangur bandits were also present in Mangur raids.

Some tribes, especially the Mangur tribe, later collaborated with the Iranian government against Kurdish separatists and joined groups such as the Muslim Peshmerga.
