= Mukriyan =

Kurdish principality

Coordinates: 36°45′47″N 45°43′20″E

Mukri Emirate موکریان
- c. 1400–c. 1800
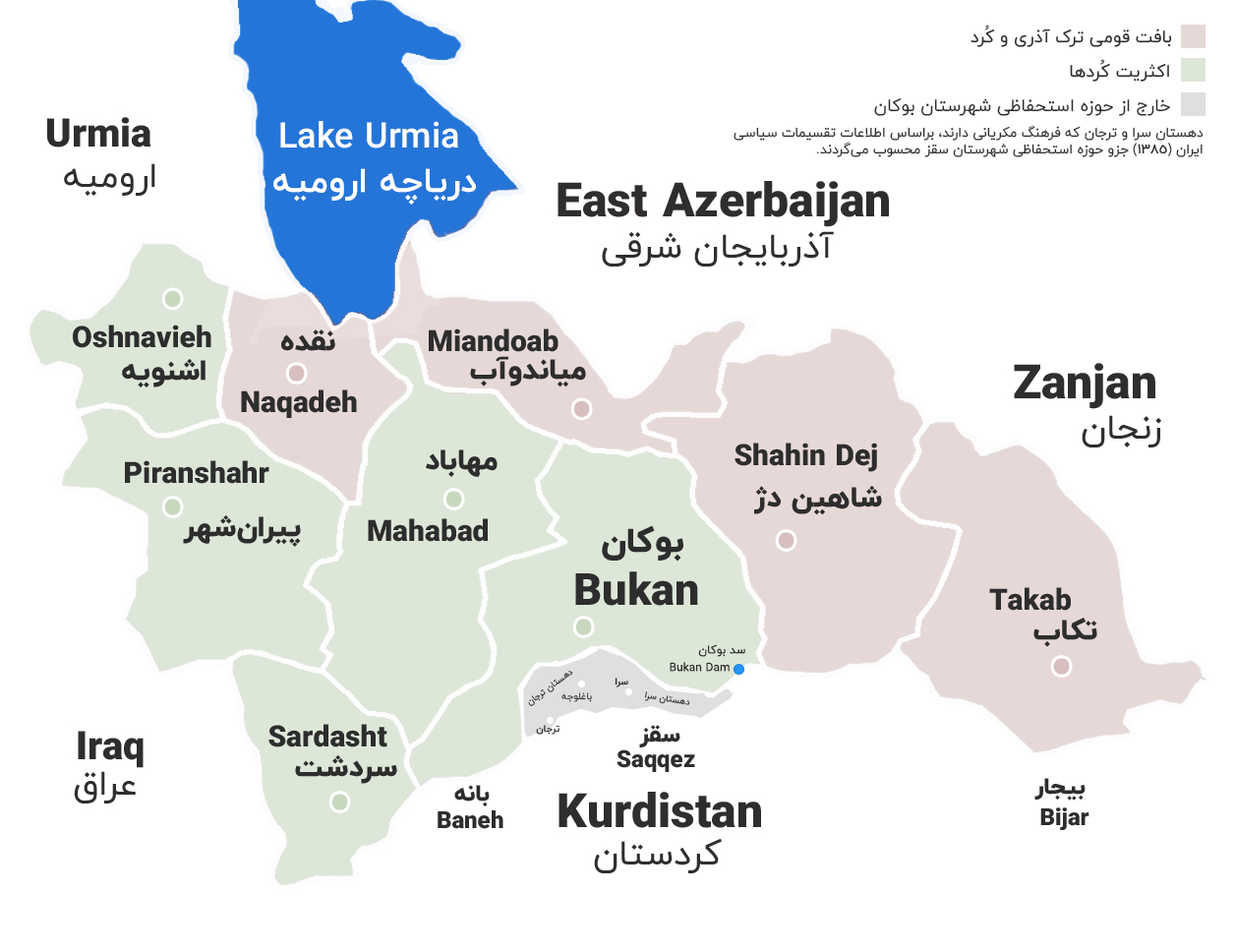
- Capital: Mahabad
- Common languages: Sorani Kurdish
- Religion: Shafiʽi Sunni Islam
- Government: Monarchy
- History
  - Established: c. 1400
  - Dissolved: c. 1800
Preceded by	Succeeded by
Hadhabani	Qajar Iran

Mukriyan (Kurdish: موکریان) or 'Deryaz' was a Kurdish principality from the late 14th century to the 19th century centered around Mahabad. Mukriyan was a neighbor to the Emirate of Bradost.

== Geography and tribes ==
Mukriyan encompassed the area south of Lake Urmia, including the cities of Mahabad, Bukan, Sardasht and Oshnaviyeh with the city of Naqadeh historically being included in Mukriyan, though today Kurds only make up approximately 35% of the city. The city of Saqqez is culturally very similar to Mukriyan, though politically it acted more as its own city-state under the Principality of Ardalan, though as an autonomous vassal and not a part of Ardalani central control.

A few tribes include Dehbruki, Gewirk, Mangur, Mukri, Bilbas, Amireh, Khelki, Sheikh Sherefi, Selekei, Ḥasan Khāli, Kārish, Silki, Sekir, Fekiyesi, Ables, Bārik, Soleimāni, Beyi, Omerbil, Merzink, Lētāu Māwet, and Shiwezāi.

== History ==
Before Mukris, the region was ruled by Hadhabanis; the region is also in the same, or similar, location as Mannea and Takht-e Soleymān.

The Mukri chiefs claimed to belong to the Mukriya tribe, and to have been family of the governors of the Baban tribe. During the period of the Turkoman dynasties (Qara Qoyunlu and Aq Qoyunlu), a certain Saif al-Din took over the district of Daryas from the Cabuklu tribe (which was potentially Turkish) and enlarging the principality by taking Sulduz, Dol-i Barik, Akhtaci, and El-Tamur, and subsequently, the tribes unified under his principality were given the name "Mukri". His son, Sarim, the next ruler of the principality, challenged and defeated Shah Isma'il in 912 AH (1506-7), and sought support and investiture from Sultan Selim, possibly in 918 AH (1512–13).

On Sarim's death, his estates were divided between his nephew Rustam's three sons, who acknowledged the superiority of Shah Tahmasp. In 948 AH (1541-2), Sultan Sulayman sent his vassals of the Bahdinan, Hakkari, and Baradust to attack the Mukri, who killed the three succeeding sons. Sarim's young son, Amira Beg I succeeded them, received investiture from the Ottomans, and ruled his fief for 30 years. With the help of the Safavids, the grandson of Rustam (also called Amira) succeeded him. However, during the troubles that came in Muhammad Khodabandeh's reign, in 1583, Amira Beg II visited Sultan Murad, from whom he received the vilayet of Baban (Shahr-i Zur) the sanjak of Mosul, Erbil, and certain dependencies of Maragheh for his sons. With the help of the Mir-i Miran of Van, Amira Beg II invaded Persian Maragheh and plundered the district, which Amira Beg was invested with the title of beyler-beyi of. The hereditary fief of Daryas, however, much to the dislike of Amira Beg, was awarded to his nephew, Hasan, who had submitted to the Ottomans before him. A civil war broke out, in which Hasan was killed, but Mehmed III simply appointed his brother Ulugh Beg as governor of the district of Dih-i Khwarkan (north of Maragheh) as a fief.

Meanwhile, the Ottomans had seized Tabriz, and its governor-general wished for Amira Beg, now Amira Pasha, to recognise his authority. The former filed complaints to Constantinople, and so his districts of Baban, Mosul, and Erbil were confiscated. Maragheh was henceforth subordinated to Tabriz, and Amira required to pay 15 kharwar of gold annually. Then, his lands were reduced to Daryas solely, but Amira's son, Shaikh Haidar, held out in the now rebuilt fortress of Saru Kurghan, which the people of Maragheh complained of, as he was a "troublesome neighbour". Khidir Pasha, governor-general of Tabriz therefore issued an edict allotting the fortress to the Mahmudi tribe. Fighting followed, and Amira Pasha had to intervene to prevent further fighting.

Around 1005 AH (1596-7), Amira Pasha and Shaikh Haidar held the districts of Daryas, Miandoab, Adjari, and Leilan, along with the fortresses of Saru Kurghan and Taraka (Taraqeh?). Maragheh was taken from him in 1578. When Amira Pasha died, his son succeeded him as chief of the Mukri, who then became governor of Maragheh in the 1580s, and held the post until 1608. Shaikh Haidar was replaced by his son, Qobad Khan Mukri, who was expelled from his post following the Mukri rebellion in 1609. During the Battle of Dimdim, Mukri rallied around Kurds of Baradust.

Shah 'Abbas married a Mukri noblewomen in 1610 after the execution of her brother, Bodagh Soltan following the defeat of the Mukri at the Battle of Dimdim.

== See also ==
- Republic of Mahabad
- Mukri tribe
