= Elopement =

Type of marriage ceremony

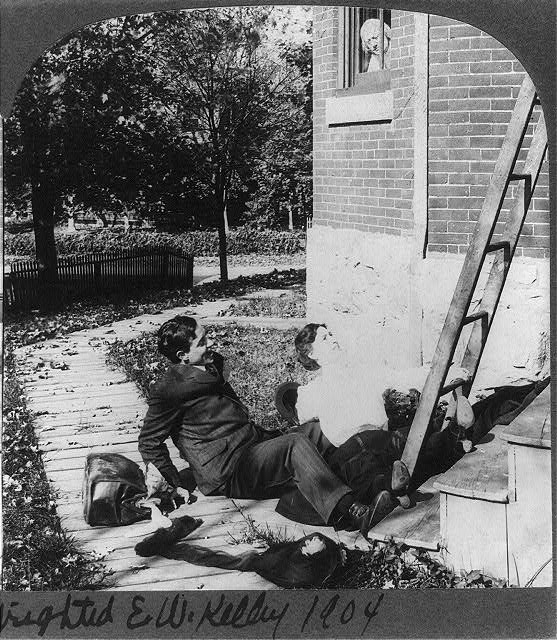
A humorous, staged photograph (circa 1904) depicting an attempted elopement with clichéd ladder to the prospective bride's upstairs bedroom. The bride has fallen down the ladder, knocking over her beau and waking her father.

Elopement is a marriage which is conducted in a sudden and secretive fashion, sometimes involving a hurried journey away from one's place of residence together with one's beloved with the intention of getting married without parental approval. An elopement is contrasted with an abduction (e.g., a bride kidnapping), in which either the bride or groom has not consented, or a shotgun wedding in which the parents of one (prototypically the bride's) coerce both into marriage.

Controversially, in modern times, elopement is sometimes applied to any small, inexpensive wedding, even when it is performed with parental foreknowledge.

The term elopement is sometimes used in its original, more general sense of escape or flight, e.g. an escape from a psychiatric institution. In this context, elopement (or wandering) can refer to a patient with dementia leaving the psychiatric unit without authorization. It has also referred to a married person leaving their spouse in order to run away with a third party.

== Background ==
Today the term "elopement" is colloquially used for any marriage performed in haste, with a limited public engagement period or without a public engagement period. Some couples elope because they wish to avoid parental or religious objections.

In some modern cases, the couple collude together to elope under the guise of a bride kidnapping, presenting their parents with a fait accompli. In most cases, however, the men who resort to capturing a wife are often of lower social status, because of poverty, disease, poor character or criminality. They are sometimes deterred from legitimately seeking a wife because of the payment the woman's family expects, the bride price (not to be confused with a dowry, paid by the woman's family). In some areas, elopement is met with violent reactions from family members, while in other places eloping has become more accepted.

== Examples ==
=== United Kingdom ===
In England, a prerequisite of Christian marriage is the "reading of the banns"—for any three Sundays in the three months prior to the intended date of the ceremony, the names of every couple intending marriage has to be read aloud by the priest(s) of their parish(es) of residence, or the posting of a 'Notice of Intent to Marry' in the registry office for civil ceremonies. The intention of this is to prevent bigamy or other unlawful marriages by giving fair warning to anybody who might have a legal right to object. In practice, however, it also gives warning to the couples' parents, who sometimes objected on purely personal grounds. To work around this, it is necessary to get a special licence from the Archbishop of Canterbury—or to flee somewhere the law did not apply.

For civil marriages notices must be posted for 28 clear days, at the appropriate register office.

=== Southeast Asia ===
==== Philippines ====
In the Philippines, elopement is called "tanan". Tanan is a long-standing practice in Filipino culture when a woman leaves her home without her parents' permission to live a life with her partner. Usually she will elope during the nighttime hours and is awaited by her lover nearby, who then takes her away to a location not of her origin. The next morning, the distraught parents are clueless to the whereabouts of their daughter. Tanan often occurs as a result of an impending arranged marriage or in defiance to parents' dislike of a preferred suitor.

==== Indonesia ====
In Indonesia, an elopement is considered as "kawin lari", translated as "runaway marriage" ("kawin", means marriage, "lari" means running/fleeing). This happens if the groom, the bride or both fail to get parental permission for the marriage. As Indonesia is a religiously strict country, a couple cannot be married without a parent's (or next closest living relative) consent. Thus, most Indonesian couples who engage in elopement often end up marrying without acknowledgment or official record by the government.

==== Malaysia ====
Similar to Indonesia, an elopement in Malaysia is considered as "kahwin lari" or "marriage on a run". This mostly occurs when either (or both) of the couple's families does not approve the relationship or when the marriage involves a foreign man. Additionally, elopement can happen when the court does not give permission for polygamy or if the man wants to keep the new marriage secret from the first wife or even the existence of the first wife from the second. The eloping couple also may get married outside the border (e.g. Pattani) when the dowry amount is too high, causing them to be desperate to run away. Elopement outside the country is valid according to certain law, but failure to register the marriage according to Islamic family law can cause issues with inheritance, performing umrah/hajj, divorce, and the registration of the birth of a child. However, some couples marry out of the country specifically to avoid the registration requirements of their Islamic religious council, which are seen by them as overly complicated.

=== West Asia ===
In Assyrian society, elopement ("Jelawta" or "Jenawta") against parental request is very disreputable, and rarely practised. In the 19th and early 20th century, Assyrians had heavily guarded their females from abduction and also consensual elopement, when it came to their neighbours such as Kurds, Azeris and Turks, who would abduct Assyrian women and marry them, in some cases forcefully, where they would convert them to Islam.

Pre-marital romance was tolerated by the Nomadic and Militaristic Kurdish Bolbas tribal confederation, most notability the Mangur tribe; these relationships usually ended up in elopement if not approved for marriage by the bride's family. These love marriages were called “radu khstn”, meaning "chased after [a person (typically a girl after a boy)]." Typically elopement was only considered honorable if the family of the bride repeatedly rejects the possibility of marriage to her lover until the bride takes it in her own hands and marries her lover herself; otherwise, such as if the bride never mentions a request to marry her lover to her family before eloping with him or in certain families who only approve elopement of divorced women and restrict virgin girls only to arranged marriages, it is considered dishonorable. Many Bolbas women had been in at least one love marriage in their life and it is considered an honor. This caused conflict with the surrounding settled-feudalistic and urbanized fellow Kurdish Mokri tribe, whom measured a woman's honor in delicacy and modesty rather than strength and stubbornness, who promoted the ban of this practice. The Mangur tribe were of the last Kurdish tribes to practice this tradition, continuing the practice until the 1980s.

==== Lebanon ====
In some cases, elopement is not always driven by parental disapproval, but can be a strategic choice for couples navigating legal barriers to inter-sectarian marriages. As discussed in Lara Deeb's book "Love Across Differences" couples may decide to perform a civil wedding abroad, typically in Cyprus, despite having full parental approval, to bypass Lebanon's sectarian personal status laws. Moreover, couples may take this decision to shield parents from societal judgement and criticism, as inter-sectarian marriages can provoke sectarian backlash. By eloping, the couple aims to take full responsibility for their decision by not relying on their parents' approval. Such cases demonstrate that elopement may serve as a practical solution rather than an act of rebellion.

== In popular culture ==
The relationship between Helen and Paris of Troy is sometimes depicted as an elopement instead of an abduction.

Patsy’s Elopement (1915) was a silent episode of an early serial film that deals with the topic humorously created by the Lubin Manufacturing Company.

Searches for elopement photography ideas on Pinterest increased by 128 percent in 2019, with other related terms like "elopements at city halls" and "elopements in forests" also seeing increases in volume.

In contract bridge, an elopement play is a form of trump coup that enables a smaller card to score a trick if it is lying over the higher card of an opponent. If the rank of the card does not matter, it is known as a "pure" elopement; if the rank does matter it is known as a "rank" elopement.

== See also ==
- Marriage law
