= Amarlu =

Amarlu may refer to:

== People ==
- Ammarlu, Kurdish tribe

== Places ==
- Amarlu District, in Gilan province, Iran
