= Mirza Fattah Khan Garmrudi =

Iranian scribe and author (ca. 1786–1848)

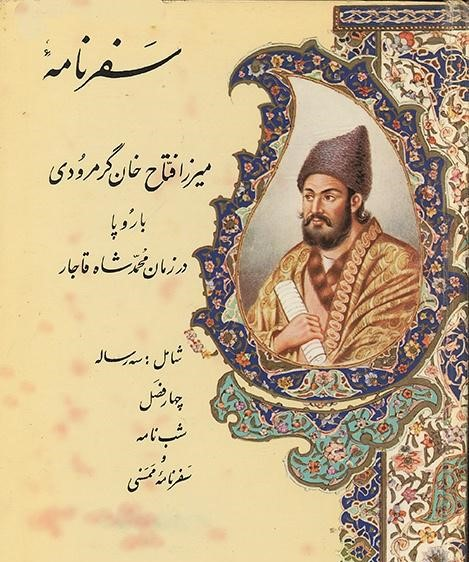
- Front cover of the 1968 publication of Mirza Fattah Khan Garmrudi's Chaharfasl
- Born: c. 1786; Kasalan, Iran
- Died: 1848; Behbahan, Qajar Iran
- Resting place: Shiraz
- Writing career
- Language: Persian
- Notable works: Chaharfasl; Shabnama; Safarnama-ye Mamasani

Mirza Fattah Khan Garmrudi (Persian: میرزا فتاح خان گرم‌رودی; c. 1786 – 1848) was a scribe and author in Qajar Iran, mainly known for his travelogue about his diplomatic missions to Europe, entitled Chaharfasl.

== Biography ==
He was born in c. 1786 in the Kasalan village near the city of Tabriz. He belonged to a family of clerics, and his appointment as an accountant in Mianeh was opposed by his father. Garmrudi was eventually moved to Tabriz, where Mirza Masoud Ansari Garmrudi and subsequently the crown prince Abbas Mirza supported him. After the Russians conquered Tabriz at the end of the Russo-Iranian War of 1826–1828, Garmrudi, as part of Abbas Mirza's staff, was sent to negotiate with the Russian general Ivan Paskevich. He was also involved in the negotiations at Dehkvaraqan and Torkamanchay, which cemented Iran's defeat. In 1834, Garmrudi was made the lashkar-nevis (chief clerk) of the army in Tehran following the succession of Mohammad Shah Qajar.

In 1838, following a dispute with England over the Herat and other issues, an Iranian delegation headed by Hossein Khan Ajudanbashi was dispatched to the European courts. Garmrudi was included in this mission, likely due to the support of Mirza Masud Khan Ansari, who served as the minister of foreign affairs during this period. Garmrudi's notability primarily stems from his travelogue of the journey, entitled Chaharfasl. The Ottoman Empire, Austria, France, and England are the nations that they traveled through, and each is covered separately in the book's four chapters. The Chaharfasl is regarded as an important record that documents early Iranian views on Europe as well as the activities of the Iranian mission.

Garmrudi's Shabnama, a defamatory tale accusing the British of sexual depravity and debauchery, was another work created due to his travels throughout Europe. The book was possibly meant as a counter to The Adventures of Hajji Baba of Ispahan by James Justinian Morier, which portrayed a negative image of Iranians. When the Iranian delegation went back in 1840 to Iran, Garmrudi stayed in the retinue of Hossein Khan. The latter was given the governorship of Yazd shortly after their return, and in 1844, he was made governor of Fars. Hossein Khan entrusted Garmrudi with the administration of the Kohgiluyeh and Mamasani, thus demonstrating his trust in him. In another work by Garmrudi, the Safarnama-ye Mamasani, he documented the tribes of the region, along with their genealogies and histories.

Garmrudi died in 1848 at Behbahan, and was buried in Shiraz.

== Sources ==
- Algar, Hamid (2020). "ʿAbd-al-Fattāḥ Garmrūdī". Encyclopaedia Iranica Online. Brill. doi:10.1163/2330-4804_EIRO_COM_4286.
