= Gewirk (tribe) =

Kurdish tribe

Gewirk (Persian: گورک, Sorani Kurdish: گەورک), also known as the "Gawerk" or "Gewrek", are a Kurdish tribe inhabiting areas of modern-day Iran, Iraq and Turkey.

== Geographical distribution ==
The people of the Gewirk tribe mainly inhabit the following cities of Iran: Urmia, Sardasht, Rabat, Mahabad, Saqez, Boukan, Salmas and Shepiran. In Turkey, they mainly inhabit the following provinces and cities: Van, Başkale and Gürpınar. In Iraq, they mainly inhabit the following Shaqlawa district of Erbil.

== Background ==
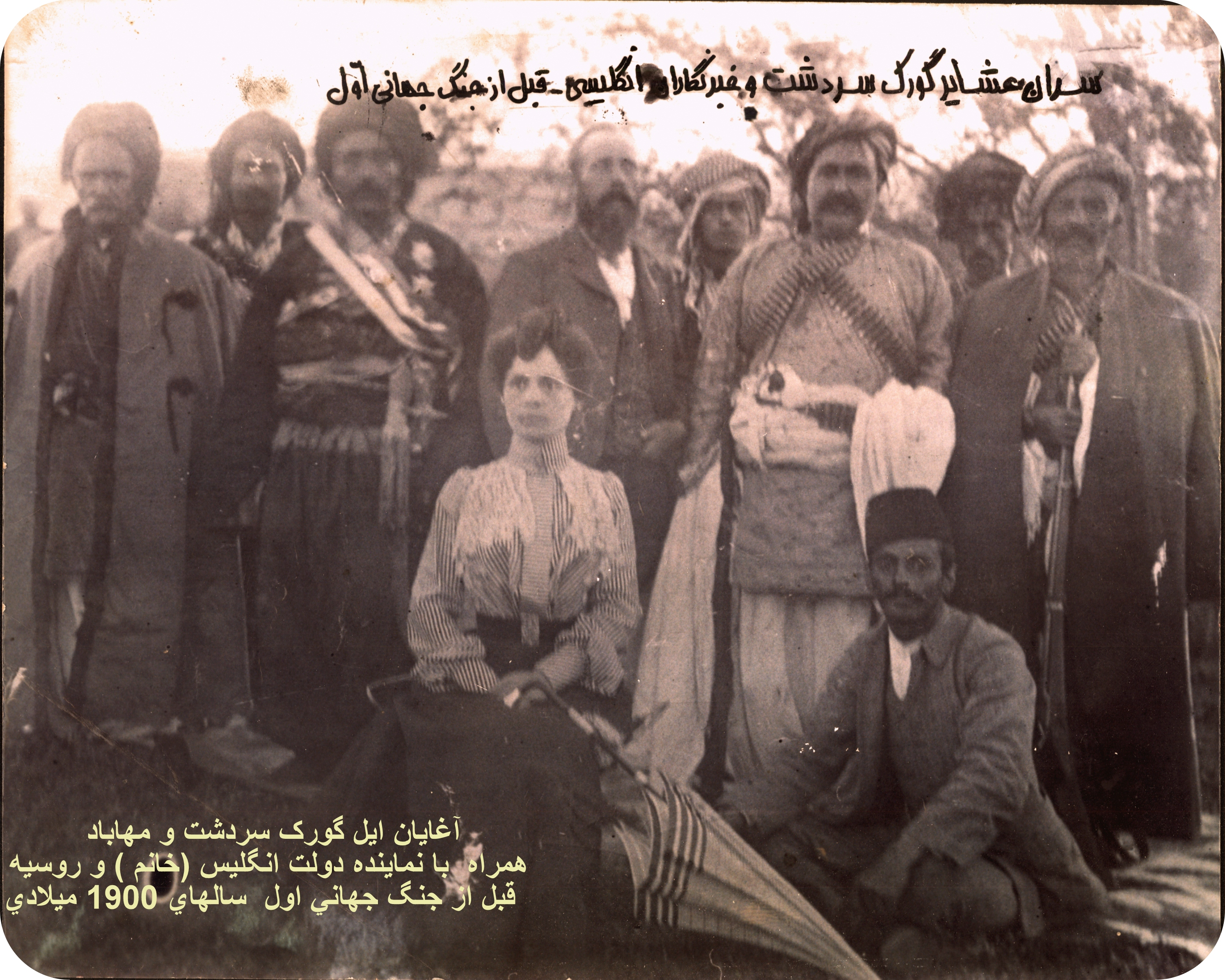
Gawerk lords of Urmia and Sardasht, early 1900s

The historical center of the Gewirk tribe is Rabat, a city in the West Azerbaijan province of Iran.

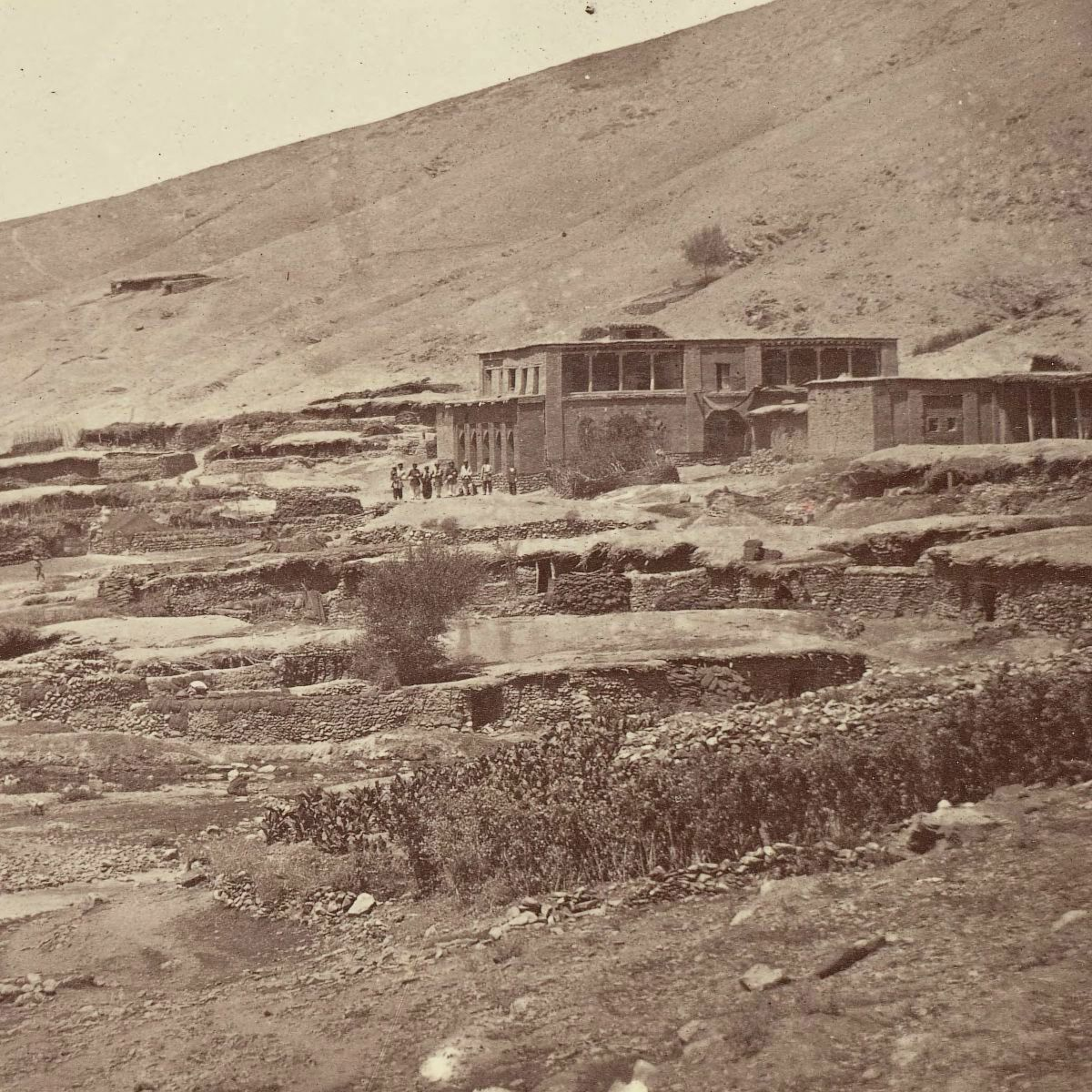
Gawerk, Mahabad, house of lords - Osman Agha & Ghader Agha Gewirk

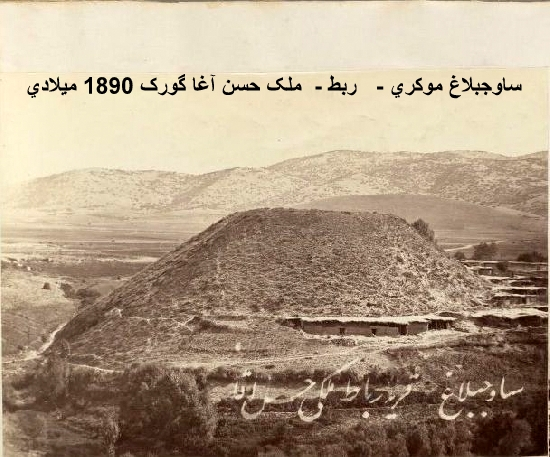
Gawerk, Rabat, Hasan Agha Gewirk, c. 1900

The tribe is a part of the Billbas Tribal Federation and with the members of the tribe speaking the Mokryan accent of the Kurdish language.

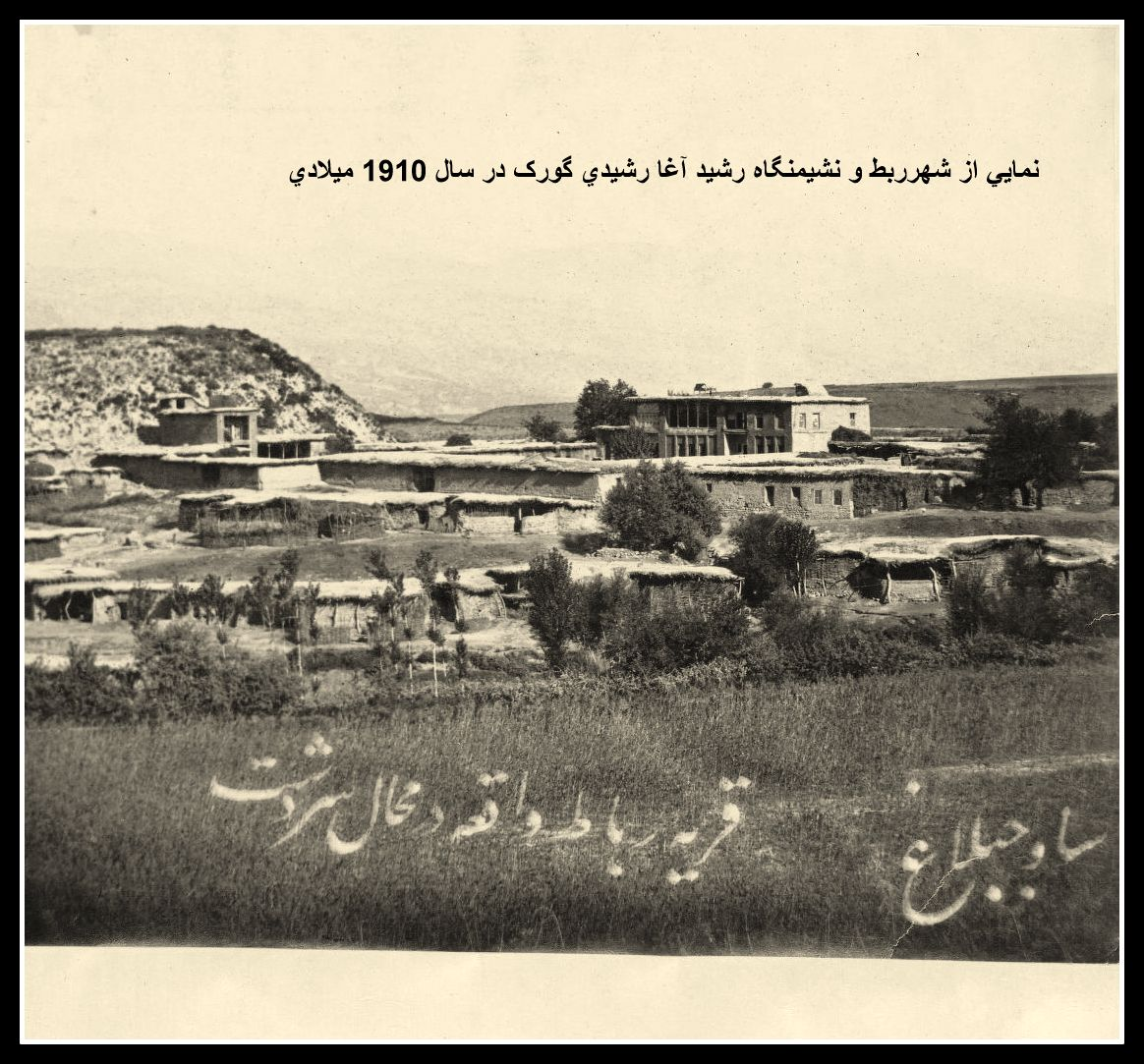
Urmia, Rabat house of Rashid Agha, c. 1900
