= Amaleh (Lorestan) =

Historic Lur tribe in Iran

The Amaleh (Persian: عمله) were a Lur tribe that mainly lived in western Iran, specifically around Lorestan. They were known for being the workers and retinue of the Vali dynasty. The tribe spoke northern Luri and followed Shia Islam and Yarsanism. The tribe disintegrated in the 19th century.

== History ==
The Amaleh tribe historically comprised the retinue of the Vali dynasty of Lorestan. The Amaleh were originally established on the ancestral domains of the Vali dynasty in Lorestan, around Tarhan, Jaydar, Kuhdasht, and Qilab, as well as around Khorramabad and Aleshtar. They were generally exempt from most taxes as they cultivated the lands of the Vali. They were estimated at between 2,000 and 3,000 families in the 1830s. The names of some of the clans within the Amaleh indicated the work they traditiinally performed, such as Ahangar (iron-smith), Mirakhor (equerry), Jelowdar (groom), Qaterchi (muleteer), Sarban (camel driver), Farrash (pitcher of tents), and Zinbardar (saddle carrier). When Fath-Ali Shah Qajar seized Pish-e-Kuh from the Vali dynasty of Lorestan, and confiscated their land, the Amaleh remained and continued to cultivate the lands on behalf of the crown, while the Vali dynasty became reduced to Posht-e-Kuh and acquired a retinue of Feyli Lurs. As a settled people, the Amaleh gradually lost their cohesion, and the tribe had thoroughly disintegrated by the end of the 19th century, with only a few of its clans, such as Amra'i and Chegini, continuing to exist as independent tribes. They were described as a sedentary tribe in Tarhan in service of the Vali. Agha Mohammad Khan Qajar moved the Amaleh to Fars, although most of them returned to Lorestan after his death, but their numbers were much reduced. A section of the Amaleh claimed descent from the tribe of Karim Khan. The Amaleh were mainly Yarsani.

The Amaleh of Lorestan were not to be confused with the Amaleh of Khuzestan, a separate tribe which were servants of the local dynasty of Shush which was related to the Vali dynasty, or the Amaleh of the Qashqai.
