= Jahanbeglu =

Kurdish tribe of Iran

The Jahanbeglu (Note: Also spelled "Janbeglu".) is a Kurdish tribe in Mazandaran Province, Iran. They were amongst several Kurdish tribes that were transplanted from northwestern Iran to Mazandaran in the late 18th century by then ruler of Iran, Agha Mohammad Khan Qajar (r. 1789–1797), in order to protect the province from Turkmen raids.

== History ==
According to a British officer after World War I by the name L. S. Fortescue, the Kurdish Jahanbeglu and Modanlu tribes together with the Turkic Usanlu and Gerayli tribes formed a loose Kurdish-Turkic tribal confederation. Altogether, he estimated the four tribes at 2,000 families. Fortescue observed that the Jahanbeglu and Modanlu groups emerged as offshoots of the Mokri tribe from Mahabad (formerly "Savojbolagh"). After being moved to Mazandaran by Agha Mohammad Khan Qajar, the Jahanbeglu settled between Behshahr (formerly "Ashraf") and Larim to the north of the province's capital Sari. There, they got involved in the cultivation of cotton and rice. However, according to Grigorii Melgunov, who visited Mazandaran in 1858–1860, a group of Jahanbeglu were also found to the southwest of Sari.

Though the Jahanbeglu and Modanlu were reportedly still able to speak in their original Kurdish dialect by 1922, they had already become significantly assimilated into the native Mazandaranis. In the subsequent decades both tribes had lost their tribal identities to such an extent that when Iraj Afshar-Sistani compiled a list of tribes of Mazandaran in 1987, they were not even mentioned.

== Notable Figures of the Jahanbeglou Tribe ==
- Khan Abdal Khan Kurd Jahanbeglou served in Agha Mohammad Khan Qajar’s army during the battle against Morteza Qoli Khan Qajar in Savadkuh in 1193 AH (1779 AD). In 1194 AH (1780 AD), Khan Abdal Khan Kurd attempted to escape from his house in Sari by digging a tunnel. However, a woman in his household informed Morteza Qoli Khan, who ordered his execution. His severed head was sent to Agha Mohammad Shah, while Mostafa Qoli Khan, his brother, was sent to greet the Shah. Despite Agha Mohammad Shah's attempts to reconcile with him and his brothers, it proved unsuccessful, ultimately leading to armed conflict. Local historians believe that rival factions, specifically the Halalkhor and Kerehoon Bandpey clans, who were in competition with Khan Abdal Khan Kurd Jahanbeglou, tricked him into going to the village of Zarak Bandpey, where he was captured, tortured, and killed. He was buried in the same location. Khan Abdal Khan Kurd Jahanbeglou was the son of Khan Ahmad Khan Kurd.
- In 1195 AH (1781 AD), after arriving in Barforoush (modern-day Babol), Agha Mohammad Khan Qajar appointed Khan Ahmad Khan Jahanbeglou as the governor of Barforoush.

Notable Figures of the Jahanbeglou Tribe
	Name	Parent	Birth	Death	Information
1	Shekarbeg Kurd Jahanbeglu	---	1640	1727	The ruler of Finderesk, located in the Astarabad region, was killed by Fath Ali Khan Qajar.
2	Khan Ahmad Khan Kurd Jahanbeglu	---	--	--	General and minister of Nader Shah
3	Isa Khan Kurd Jahanbeglu	---	--	1749	General of Nader Shah
4	Ibrahnim Khan Kurd Jahanbeglu	---		1755	General of Nader Shah
5	Khan Abdal Khan (Ali) Kurd Jahanbeglu	Khan Ahmad Khan	1750	1779	The General of Karim Khan Zand and ruler of the Mazandaran region under Agha Mohammad Khan Qajar was killed by Kerehoon Ahmadi and Morteza Qoli Kan Qajar forces.
6	Mohamad M. Ali	Khan Abdal Khan	1775	1855	Artist
7	Mirza Khan	Khan Abdal Khan	1777	1850	Artist and writer
8	Abbas Qoli Khan Kurd Jahanbeglu	---		1853	General of Naser o Din Shah
9	Esmail Khan Mir Panj Kurd Jahanbeglu	---			General of Nader o din Shah

== Sources ==
- Oberling, P. (2008). "JAHĀNBEGLU". In Yarshater, Ehsan (ed.). Encyclopædia Iranica. Vol. XIV/4: Jade III–Jamalzadeh, Mohammad-Ali II. Work. London and New York: Routledge & Kegan Paul. p. 375. ISBN 978-1-934283-04-2.
