= Piran (tribe) =

Kurdish tribe

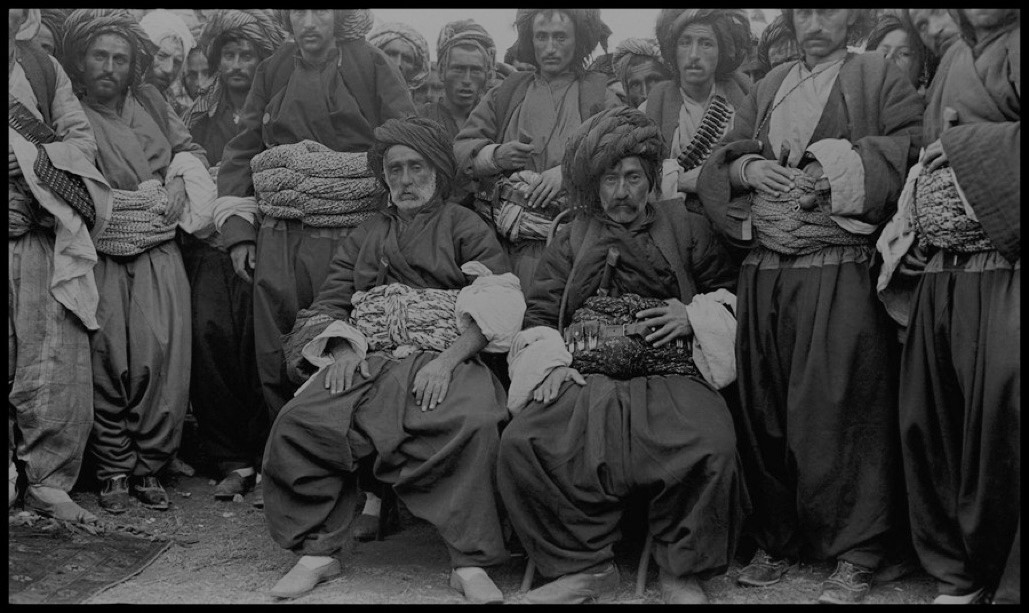
Mohammad Amin Agha Piran in 1913 before World War I

The Piran (Kurdish: پیران, Pîran) are a Kurdish sub-tribe of blbas living mainly in Iran and Iraq. They speak Sorani Kurdish and follow Sunni Islam.

== History ==
The Piran traditionally live in Piranshahr in northwest Iran and in Erbil Province on the Iran-Iraq border. They also live in a dozen villages around the Ranya District. Their number was estimated between 600 and 750 families in the early 20th century. The Piran, along with the tribes of Mangur, Mamash, Senn, Ramk, and Kabaez, were historically part of the Bilbas confederation. The Piran tribe supported Simko Shikak in 1921, and the Republic of Mahabad in 1946.

== See also ==
- Kurdish tribes
