= Chegini (tribe) =

Kurdish tribe

The Chegini tribe (/tʃʌˈɡiːni/ cheg-EE-nee; Kurdish: چەگینی Çengînî; Persian: چگنی) is a mostly sedentary Kurdish tribe which lives in Lorestan province and scattered around Qazvin province and Fars province in Iran. The tribe also lives in Kurdistan Region and Kirkuk in Iraq. While the tribe migrated to Lorestan from Northwestern Iran, not much info exist on its origins.

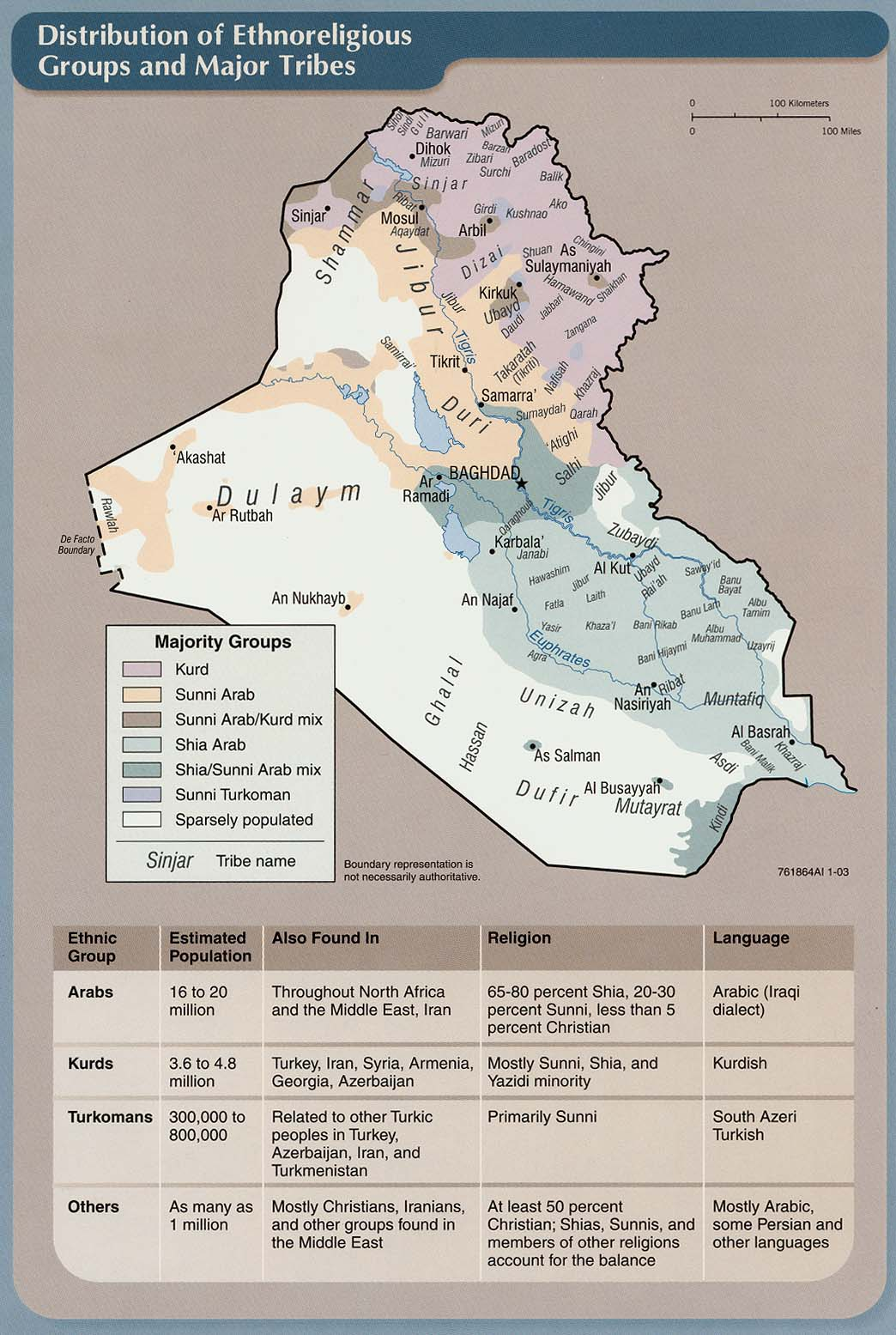
A 2003 CIA Factbook map which includes the Chegini north of Sulaymaniyah

== History ==
Charles MacGregor classified the tribe as Kurdish in his topographical and ethnographical oeuvre from 1872. According to Schindler, they were "descendants of the great Kurdish tribe, whose main part in the province of Kermânshâh." They were also historically mentioned as a Kurdish tribe allied with the Safavids, and as a Kurdish component of the Qizilbash, among the few non-Turkic groups. According to Pierre Oberling, the Chegini tribe originated from northwestern Iran but lived in Lorestan, Fars, and Qazvin, and were mentioned as a Kurdish tribe by Sharafkhan Bidlisi and Iskandar Beg Munshi, although Oskar Mann suggested that the name Chegini may have been related to "čingāna", a term for the gypsy community, and Rabino mentioned that the gypsies of Astarabad, Golestan were often called Chigini. Others suggested that the name of the Chegini tribe was related to their profession in sheep shearing, with another claim that the Chegini received their name from the local Kurds due to their unique practice of cutting four or five points on the ears of their sheep. However, Joyce Blau wrote that the Chegini were historically mentioned as Kurds or Lurs, leading to different classifications. Many sources considered the Chegini tribe as Lurs originally from Luristan, and one of the tribes of Bala Gariva which later dispersed to Azerbaijan and Persian Iraq where they engaged in banditry during the reign of Shah Tahmasp I, who then ordered their expulsion from Safavid territory. The Chegini Lurs were historically part of the Amaleh.

Sharafkhan Bidlisi claimed that the three original Kurdish tribes of Iran were the Chegini, Zangana, and Siyah Mansur. He also claimed those three tribes were deported to Khorasan by Shah Tahmasb I. He further claimed that tribe lived by brigandage and intercepting the roads, and had no emir or mirza to lead the tribe like the other Kurdish tribes did.

Historical sources indicated that the Chegini tribe was dispersed out of their homeland in Iraqi Kurdistan during the Safavid era, being scattered in groups to regions such as Khorasan, Herat, Gharjestan. A large group of the Chegini tribe had a long presence in Lorestan and their traditional region was between Sefidkuh, Khorramabad, and Tarhan. The Chegini tribe, while still in Kurdistan, first rose to prominence under the rule of the Aq Qoyunlu, when two Chegini leaders, Mansur Beg and his son Shad Beg, entered the service of Sultan Yaqub. Shad Beg was governor of Kurdistan until 1489. By the time the Safavids came to power, the Chegini tribe were at the apex of their power and influence, and had carried out extensive raids in northwestern Persia. Shah Tahmasb I, after many complaints from merchants, ordered around 500 of the top Chegini warriors to leave his domains. They initially headed for India but later settled in Khorasan, where Shah Tahmasb allowed them to reside in Quchan and appointed Budaq Chegini as their leader. When Shah Mohammad Khodabanda came to power, Budaq Khan was made governor of Quchan and the surrounding districts, and when Shah Abbas I reorganized the administration of Khorasan, he appointed Budaq Khan as atabeg of Prince Soltan Hasan Mirza, and as governor of Mashhad, and his territory in Quchan was divided among his sons and brothers. However, he had disagreements with the Shah, and fled to Quchan and was dismissed as governor of Mashhad. When the Shah left Khorasan, Budaq Khan tried to regain ascendancy, but the Uzbeks launched a new offensive before he could reach Mashhad. Budaq Khan and Ommat Khan, the new governor of Mashhad, despite being enemies, made an alliance against the invaders.

Around 1590, Huseyn Ali Khan, the younger son of Budaq Khan, who had been given a place among the companions of the shah, was executed for seditious behavior. Budaq Khan and his remaining sons returned to the favor of the Shah, and Hasan Ali Khan, the older son of Budaq Khan, was appointed governor of Hamadan, but was dismissed after five years and reinstated as the governor of Bestam. In 1597-98, he was killed while fighting the Uzbeks. Budaq Kuan was employed at court and appointed as governor of Esfarain in 1595-96, and once again as governor of Mashhad in July 1598. Other Chegini leaders during the reign of Shah Abbas I were Bayram-Ali Soltan, the brother of Hasan Ali Khan and his successor as governor of Bestam, 'Ashur Khan, who was governor of Marv-e Shahijan, or Great Marv, in 1622-23, and Ahmad Soltan bin Jami Soltan, who was governor of Sabzevar. There were also Chegini Kurds who were deported from Hamadan to Astarabad.

Pierre Oberling pointed out that the only trace of the Chegini tribe in Kurdistan was a tiny village named Chegini in the dehestān of Gav Baza, in the šahrestān of Bijar. However, there were still descendants of the Chegini tribe Luristan, although mostly sedentarized, and in the early 1900s, comprised the clans of Tahmasbkhani, Hatemkhani, Fath Allahi, and Hajiha. Tahmasbkhani was divided into the Haji, Sabzavar, Budaq, Fath Allah Jomaat Karim, Hatemvand, Shakarvand, and Wayskara clans. Hatemkhani was divided into the Hosivand, Mirzavand, Sharaf, Darvish, Hammam, and Jawwar clans. The names Budaq and Sabzavar suggested that some of the Cheginis of Khorasan later migrated to Luristan. The Lur tribes of Tilawi (Tolabi), Amir (Mir), Hayat Ghaibi, and Pir Hayati later migrated to the Chegini region of Lorestan and joined the Chegini tribe. The Chegini tribe fought against Reza Shah during his campaign in Luristan.

The Chegini tribe was present in Kirkuk and Sulaymaniyah as well. They were also present in Qazvin, around Eqbal, Qaqazan, and Tarom, and were said to have been moved there by Agha Mohammad Khan Qajar. The Chegini tribe in Qazvin comprised the clans of Bahadivand, Babai, Papai, Pirmardvand, Pirqolivand, Pachenar, Kherekani, Darvishvand, Kalvand, Gugir, Gudarzvand, Malamir, Mirkhand, Mokhtarvand, and Nezamivand. There was also a clan of the Qashqai Amala tribe named Chegini, which lived around Firuzabad, Samirom, and Khurmuj. There was also a clan of the Shiri tribe of the Jabbara Arabs in Fars named Awlad-e-Chegini. The Chegini of Fars possibly came with the Kurdish tribes that accompanied Karīm Khan Zand to southern Iran. The majority of the Chegini lived in Lorestan province. The Chegini tribe in Lorestan spoke their own dialect of Northern Luri. The Chegini tribe in Qazvin spoke Luri and Turkic, and groups of Chegini in Khorasan spoke Turkic as well. The Chegini tribe in Kurdistan mostly followed Shafi'i Sunni Islam while the Chegini in Qazvin and Lorestan were mostly Shia Muslims.

== See also ==
- Kurdish tribes
