= Taraqeh =

Taraqeh طراقه
- Village
- Location within Iran
- Coordinates: 36°31′38″N 45°58′32″E
- Country: Iran
- Province: West Azerbaijan
- County: Bukan
- Bakhsh: Central
- Rural District: Il Teymur

Population (2006)
  - Total: 101
- Time zone: UTC+3:30 (IRST)
  - Summer (DST): UTC+4:30 (IRDT)

Taraqeh (Persian: طراقه, also Romanized as Tarāqeh; also known as Torgheh) is a village in Il Teymur Rural District, in the Central District of Bukan County, West Azerbaijan Province, Iran. At the 2006 census, its population was 101, in 18 families.
