= Hossein Khan Ajudanbashi =

Iranian military commander and governor

Mirza Hossein Khan Ajudanbashi
- میرزا حسین‌خان آجودانباشی
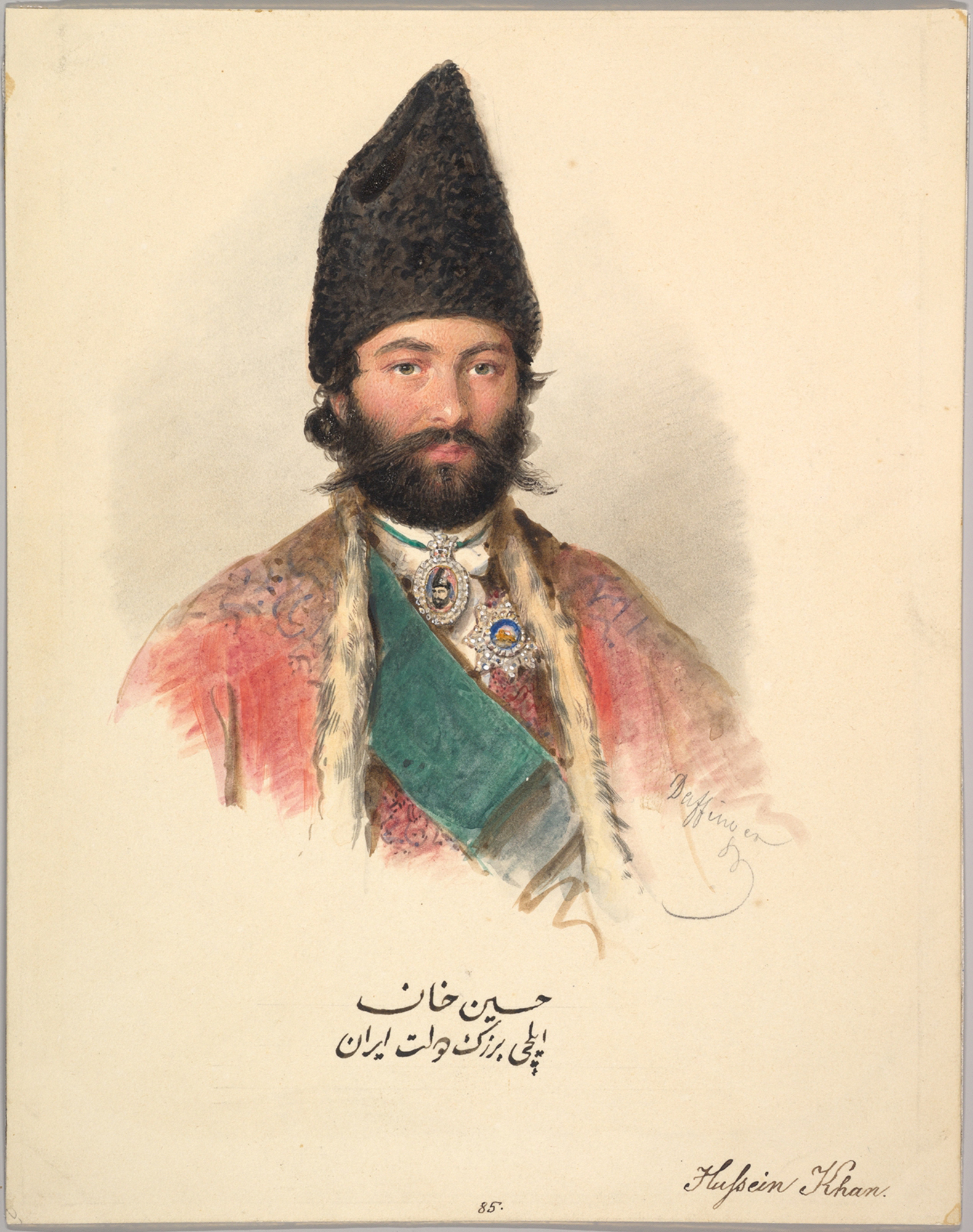
- Portrait of Hossein Khan Ajudanbashi

Governor of Fars
- In office 1844–1848
- Monarch: Mohammad Shah Qajar
- Preceded by: Mirza Nabi Khan Qazwini
- Succeeded by: Bahram Mirza

Personal details
- Born: c. 1798 Qajar Iran
- Died: 1862–1867 Qajar Iran
- Children: Ali Khan

Military service
- Allegiance: Qajar Iran
- Battles/wars: Russo-Iranian War of 1826–1828; First Herat War

Hossein Khan Ajudanbashi (Persian: حسین خان آجودانباشی) was a 19th-century Iranian military commander, diplomat, and governor during the reigns of Fath-Ali Shah Qajar (r. 1797–1834), Mohammad Shah Qajar (r. 1834–1848), and Naser al-Din Shah Qajar (r. 1848–1896).

== Biography ==
Hossein Khan was born in c. 1798. Since the Safavid era (1501–1736), his family had held the position of chief officer in army of the Azerbaijan region, a post he now held. During the Russo-Iranian War of 1826–1828, Hossein Khan oversaw a section of the Iranian army. Mohammad Khan Amir Nezam Zangana, the commander of the army of Azerbaijan, helped Hossein Khan advance to the position of ajudanbashi (adjutant-chief), thereby making him practically his deputy. During the First Herat War, Ajudanbashi was in charge of the army of Azerbaijan.

== Diplomatic mission to Europe ==
While still camped outside of Herat in July 1838, Mohammad Shah realized that he would soon have to withdraw his forces, and thus dispatched a delegation led by Ajudanbashi to Europe in order to meet with high-ranking Austrian, French, and British officials in order to clarify the Iranian government's claims and express disapproval of British interfering in the affairs of Herat.

On 13 September 1838, Ajudanbashi and his group departed Tabriz and traveled across the territory of the Ottoman Empire. One of the members of this delegation was the scribe Mirza Fattah Khan Garmrudi, who wrote a travelogue about their journey, entitled Chaharfasl. Klemens von Metternich, the Austrian chancellor, welcomed him warmly in Vienna and made arrangements to ensure that he would also be welcomed in Britain as a representative of the Iranian government. Ajudanbashi was favourably accepted in France as well, but not in Britain since the government there was unwilling to look into his case.

Ajudanbashi specifically objected to the role that John McNeill, the British ambassador in Iran, was playing. In Mohammad Shah's opinion, McNeill was openly interfering in Iranian affairs and making irrational allegations and demands. The primary task of Ajudanbashi was to negotiate the restoration of diplomatic ties with the British government (which McNeill had damaged in anger at their refusal of Iran to abide by his demands), the removal of British troops from the Kharg Island, and the selection of a new ambassador to take McNeill's position. Additionally, Ajudanbashi carried a friendly and optimistic letter written by Mohammad Shah to the newly ascended Queen Victoria (r. 1837–1901).

Due to the unbending stance taken by the British foreign secretary Lord Palmerston in regards to the demands made towards the Iranian government, Ajudanbashi was unable to make his government's demands heard—let alone met—by British government officials. Instead, Ajudanbashi tried writing to parliamentarians and foreign diplomats, but those efforts also were unsuccessful. He ultimately departed England in the middle of July 1839. On his way back to Iran, Ajudanbashi had visited France again, where he managed to re-establish relations between the two countries, which had been practically stale since the death of the French diplomat and general Claude Mathieu de Gardane in 1818. When Ajudanbashi returned to Iran, he learned that Palmerston's conditions had been reluctantly accepted by the prime minister Haji Mirza Aqasi, who had received the approval of Mohammad Shah.

== Governor of Fars ==
Appointed as governor of Fars in 1844, Hossein Khan set out to increase the province's tax revenue. In 1846, he demanded 30,000 tumans for a military expedition against Bandar Abbas, causing a rupture in relations with the Imam of Musqat. The death of Mohammad Shah in September 1848 sparked two months of anarchy where, aided by the Ilbegi and his tribal contingents, the townspeople of Shiraz attacked the citadel and the bazaars, inflicting much damage on public and private property. This uprising, a genuine expression of widespread discontent with Hossein Khans rule, only subsided with the appointment of his successor in December later that year.

== Imprisonment ==
Amir Kabir, in an unusual move, allowed his animosity at Ajudanbashi to overcome him and thus forced Ajudanbashi to resign from his position and then had him imprisoned. Although the cause of this hostility has never been established, it may have been due to Ajudanbashi's close relationship with Mirza Mehdi Navvab, one of Amir Kabir's enemies and author of the Dastur al-a'qab.

Ajudanbashi disappears from records afterwards, dying somewhere between 1862 and 1867. He was survived by his son Ali Khan, who worked in the foreign ministry and died on 26 February 1884.

== Sources ==
- Algar, Hamid (2020). "ʿAbd-al-Fattāḥ Garmrūdī". Encyclopaedia Iranica Online. Brill.
- Ardakani, H. Mahbubi (2004). "Ḥosayn Khan Ājudān-bāši". In Yarshater, Ehsan (ed.). Encyclopædia Iranica. Vol. XII/5: Homosexuality III–Human migration II. London and New York: Routledge & Kegan Paul. p. 513. ISBN 978-0-933273-79-5.
- Eslami, Kambiz (2009). "Ajūdānbāshī". In Fleet, Kate; Krämer, Gudrun; Matringe, Denis; Nawas, John; Rowson, Everett (eds.). Encyclopaedia of Islam (3rd ed.). Brill Online. ISSN 1873-9830.
