= Kasalan =

Kasalan كسلان
- Village
- Location within Iran
- Coordinates: 37°38′51″N 47°39′42″E
- Country: Iran
- Province: East Azerbaijan
- County: Meyaneh
- Bakhsh: Kandovan
- Rural District: Tirchai

Population (2006)
  - Total: 209
- Time zone: UTC+3:30 (IRST)
  - Summer (DST): UTC+4:30 (IRDT)

Kasalan (Persian: كسلان, also Romanized as Kasalān) is a village in Tirchai Rural District, Kandovan District, Meyaneh County, East Azerbaijan Province, Iran. At the 2006 census, its population was 209, in 59 families.
