= Kakavand (tribe) =

Kurdish tribe in Iran and Iraq

Kakavand (Kurdish: کاکەوەن) is a Kurdish tribe residing in Kermanshah Province, Lorestan Province in Iran and around Khanaqin in Iraq.

In 1957, an 11-hour battle between the Kakavand tribe and the gendarmerie in Kermanshah left 18 tribesmen dead and 45 wounded. In the second half of the 20th century they established themselves in the Pishkuh area of Lorestan, and also to the west of Qazvin and in Tarom. They speak Laki and adhere to Yarsanism.
