= Ajudan-Bashi =

Semi military title in Iran

Ajudan-Bashi, Ajudanbashi or Ajoodan-Bashi (Persian: آجودان باشی, lit. 'Chief Adjutant') is a persian honorific title originated from french military title Adjudant-en-chef, the first half of the term is borrowed from the French, while the rest is rendered by Bashi, the term of Turkic origin meaning "Head". In the military organization of the Qajar era, the Ajudan-Bashi was aide and deputy to the army commander (Amir-e Nezam).

== History ==
The term started using after creation of Nezam-e Jadid, the modern army by Crown prince Abbas Mirza in the early 19th-century. It seems that the title was first held by Hossein Khan Moqaddam Maragha'i during the reign of Mohammad Shah Qajar (r. 1834–1848). During the First Herat War, Hossein Khan was in charge of the army of Azerbaijan.

== Sources ==
- Ardakani, Hosayn M. (1984). "Ājūdān-Bāšī". In Yarshater, Ehsan (ed.). Encyclopædia Iranica (Online ed.). Encyclopædia Iranica Foundation.
- Eslami, Kambiz (2009). "Ajūdānbāshī". In Fleet, Kate; Krämer, Gudrun; Matringe, Denis; Nawas, John; Rowson, Everett (eds.). Encyclopaedia of Islam (3rd ed.). Brill Online. ISSN 1873-9830.
- Ardakani, Hosayn M. (2004). "Ḥosayn Khan Ājudān-Bāši". In Yarshater, Ehsan (ed.). Encyclopædia Iranica (Online ed.). Encyclopædia Iranica Foundation.
