= Mokri tribe =

Kurdish tribe in Iran

The Mukri tribe is a Kurdish tribe residing in Mukriyan, Iranian Kurdistan. Mukri princes made up the elite-ruling class of the emirate of Mukriyan.

== History ==
The Mukri are notable for having produced many distinguished figures, such as Peshewa Qazi Muhammad, and Aziz Khan Mukri who served as commander-in-chief of the Qajar Army from 1853 to 1857.

Abbas I of Persia married a Mukri noblewoman and daughter of the Mukri governor of Maragheh in 1610 CE after defeating the Mukri in the Siege of Dimdim and executing her brother and his men; despite being a relatively young bride, she was known to be previously popular among the Mukri.

Mukri women traditionally mixed with men and did not veil, it was also standard for Mukris to greet guests with cheek kisses even between opposite genders. However, despite their free association with men, women had to, historically, abide to the Mukri patriarchal code to "retain their honor” such as not engaging in adultery, which includes subtle romance such as courtship and romantic relationships with the absence of fornication which was otherwise tolerated by the surrounding semi-nomadic Kurdish Bolbas tribes like the Mangur, whose tribeswomen enjoyed greater freedoms compared to urban women of the Mukri.

== See also ==
- Mukriyan

== Sources ==
- Oberling, Pierre (2000). "Mokri tribe". Encyclopædia Iranica, online edition. New York.
