= Galbaghi (tribe) =

Kurdish tribe living mainly in Iran

گەلباخی; گلباغی

Regions with significant populations
- Iran

Religion
- Shafi'i Sunni Islam

Related ethnic groups
- Kurds

The Galbaghi (Kurdish: گەلباخی Gelbaxî; Persian: گلباغی) are a Kurdish tribe living mainly in Iran, mostly in Kurdistan province but also Hamadan, Isfahan, and Yazd provinces. They mainly speak Sorani Kurdish and are mostly Sunni Muslim.

== History ==
The Galbaghi were said to have come to Iranian Kurdistan from the Chu-Alan fortress of Sulaymaniyah during the reign of Shah Tahmasp I. They were educated and employed in the city of Sanandaj as servants and laborers for the rulers of Kurdistan and elders of the province. Some were engaged in business, and others lived nomadic lives in the mountains. Soon, conflict broke out between the Galbaghi and the Jaf tribe, and several people from both sides were killed.

The name of the Galbaghi tribe was said to originate from Abbas Agha Nami, a chieftain of the Ostajlu tribe of Azerbaijan, who historically ruled over the Galbaghi. He had left Azerbaijan and came to Kurdistan which was ruled by the Ardalan dynasty. Abbas Agha, to prove his loyalty, married a daughter of one of the tribe leaders. Abbas Agha was known for owning and maintaining a garden, and greeting everyone who passed by, saying "gal bagha", meaning "come to the garden" in Azerbaijani. The local Kurds nicknamed him Galbaghi. In appreciation of his efforts in suppressing the Uzbeks in Khorasan, Shah Tahmasp I, by decree, granted him the land of Bilaver and the leadership of several local tribes, including the Soleymani, Madeki, and Kalhor, which united under Abbas Agha and were known as Galbaghi. After his death, the Bega-Beg of Ardalan, Ali Beg, who was his grandson, became the leader of the Galbaghi. Ali Beg was powerful and united many Kurdish tribes under his rule, and died around 1560-61. The rule of the Galbaghi tribe became hereditary afterwards. Later on, their emirate came to an end, and they were brought under direct control by the Ardalan. Under Reza Shah, they were brought under direct rule, and some of them were relocated from Kurdistan to Hamadan, Isfahan, and Yazd. The Galbaghi revolted against the government after Turkic speakers were reportedly settled in their land.

The Galbaghi tribe traditionally lived in Hubatu, Saral, and Qaratora. The tribe historically consisted of the clans of Qamari, Gameli, Kak, Sevandi, Moradgurani, Jujerashi, Pitavesari, Hamzayi, and Kalkalni (Qalkhani). They mostly followed Shafi'i Sunni Islam.
