= Nanakali (tribe) =

Kurdish tribe mostly in Iran

The Nanakali (Kurdish: نانەکەلی, Nanekelî; Persian: نانکلی, Nankoli) are a Kurdish tribe living mainly in Iran. They mostly live around Kermanshah, but also around Tehran. They speak Laki and were Yarsani.

== History ==
The Nanakali were historically Yarsani. Historical sources indicated that the Nanakali accompanied Nader Shah on his way back to Mashhad. In 1791–92, groups of Nanakali joined the army of Lotf Ali Khan along with the Mafi tribe. In 1798, Ali Hemmat Khan and his brother Baba Khan of the Nanakali tribe were executed by Fath-Ali Shah Qajar after they supported Soleyman Khan, the pretender to the Iranian throne. The Nanakali tribe mainly lived around its traditional lands near Kermanshah, although they were also present in the region around Tehran. They were also considered a Lak tribe. The "Nanakalivand" were mentioned in a list of the "Vand tribes". In the 19th century, the Nanakali were estimated at 700 tents.
