= Ammarlu =

The Ammarlu is a Kurdish tribe in the Gilan and Khorasan provinces of Iran. Originally from Kurdistan, they were deported by Shah Abbas I (r. 1587–1629) during the Safavid period to the north of the Kopet Dag, along with other Kurdish tribes, in order to defend the frontier against the Uzbeks. Many Ammarlus were also deported to the Tarom region in Gilan, though it is uncertain if it took place under Shah Abbas I or Nader Shah (r. 1736–1748).

Tired from the attacks of the frontier tribes, the deported Kurds north of the Kopet Dag were forced into the southern mountains during the rule of Shah Soltan Hoseyn (r. 1694–1722). There, they expelled the Geraylis and occupied their pasture lands. At that time the Geraylis controlled Quchan, Shirvan, Bojnord, and Samalqan. The Ammarlus of Khorasan today live northwest of Nishapur, in the lowlands of Marusk. They numbered around 500 families in 1929.

In 1838, the Ammarlus of Tarom were still nomadic, but by 1922 they had become settled, numbering around 1,600 families in the Amarlu District, across fifty villages from Manjil to Pir-e Kuh. They belonged to the clans of Shah Qulanlu, Beyshanlu, Shamkanlu, Bahadullu, and Ustajanlu.

Although a Kurdish tribe with such name does not exist, Sir Henry Rawlinson suggested that the Ammarlus were a branch of the Lulu tribe. According to Vladimir Minorsky, Rawlinson may have been referencing the Lolo tribe, whose remaining members live in Tehran and northern Syria.

== Sources ==
- Oberling, Pierre (1989). "ʿAmmārlū". In Yarshater, Ehsan (ed.). Encyclopædia Iranica (Online ed.). Encyclopædia Iranica Foundation. ISBN 978-0710091215.
