= Bilbas =

Kurdish tribe in Iran and Iraq

The Bilbas or Belbas (Kurdish: بڵباس, Biłbas) are a historical Kurdish tribal confederation living mainly on the borderlands in Iran and Iraq. They speak Kurdish and mainly follow Sunni Islam.

== History ==
The Bilbas confederation are generally divided into the tribes of Mangur, Mamash, Piran, Senn, and Ramk, others added the Kaba'ez, which is said to only comprise 200 people in 1820. The Bilbas may have included as many as ten tribes. The Bilbas tribes traditionally lives in the mountainous region straddling the Lawen river, which formed the upper waters of the Little Zab. There was little information on the early history of the Bilbas, although they were described as an offshoot of the Ruzhaki tribe. Others added the Balaki tribe among the Bilbas. Minorsky described the Bilbas as an important Kurdish tribe established on the southern bank of the Gadir and on the headwaters of the Little Zab. He added that the Sharafnama mentioned the Bilbas as one of the two tribes of the Ruzhaki confederation alongside the Qawalisi, and that Sharafkhan Bidlisi quoted another tradition, according to which the Bilbasi and Qawalisi (perhaps at a later stage) belonged to the Baban confederation of Shahrizor, from which the Mukri were claimed to have originated. They generally live along the Qandil mountain range. Minorsky rejected the suggestions that the name of the Mangur tribe was of Mongol origin and added that they had parallel origins to the Mukri. The nearby Kurdish tribe of Gewrik were generally not considered Bilbas. Sharafkhan Bidlisi listed the Bilbasi tribes as Kelechiri, Khirbeli, Baliki or Bayigi, Khiyarti, Guri, Berishi, Sekri, Garisi or Karsi, Biduri, and Bela Kurdi. The main Bilbas tribes were the Mamash, Mangur, and Piran in West Azerbaijan province and Iraqi Kurdistan. Abbas Eqbal Ashtiani wrote that there was a Bakhtiari tribe known as Bolvasi (بلواسی) or Abo'l-Abbasi (ابوالعباسی) which descended from the Kurdish tribe of Bilbas, adding that their name was also a corruption of Bilbas despite them claiming it to be the original form.

Shah Abbas resettled around 30,000 Kurdish families of the Bilbas from Erzurum to strategic locations in Khorasan and in Astarabad to defend the border from Uzbeks. From the 16th to the 19th century, the main rival of the Bilbas confederation were the Mukri confederation, another Kurdish confederation which was related to the Bilbas. The Bilbas tribes of Senn and Ramk were said to have provided Nader Shah with the most dashing cavalry, and later on, they were classified among "those of the most notorious fame in the arts and achievements of rapine" throughout Kurdistan. In one, possibly two occasions, the Bilbas pillaged Maragheh and even threatened Tabriz. In spring 1818, Abbas Mirza, the governor-general of Azerbaijan, launched a punitive expedition against the Bilbas and was supported by Mohammad Pasha, the emir of Rawandiz, and Ahmad Khan Moqaddam, the beglerbegi of Maragheh and Tabriz. During the campaign, around 6,000 families of the Mamash tribe were rounded up and forcefully settled down on a stretch of open ground near Lake Urmia with their cattle, around 40 of their leaders were taken to Rawandiz but killed after trying to escape. Other Bilbas leaders were allegedly slaughtered at a banquet given by Ahmad Khan Moqaddam in Maragheh. Fraser noted in October 1834 that the Bilbas were "much broken" and had "fallen greatly into decay". The lowland tribes of the Bilbas, mainly comprising the Mamash, Mangur, and Piran, were reduced to fewer than 2,000 families, although a "considerable number" of Bilbas were still fully nomadic and "unapproachable in their wild haunts", During Ottoman and Iranian disputes over pasturelands, the Mangur were possibly prompted to favor Ottoman sovereignty as the tensions increased during the power vacuum with the Mamash which were historically loyal to Iran. While the Mamash supported Iran, the Mangur insisted on its independence and migrating between pasturelands, while the Piran had switched over to the Iranian side.

The Bilbas tribes of Mamash and Mangur joined the rebellion of the Sheikh Ubeydullah in 1880. Beginning in late December 1914, the two tribes also joined the Ottoman invasion in which the Turks and their Kurdish allies occupied Tabriz in early January 1915, but abandoned it later that month. The rout continued until May 25, 1915, when the Russians had occupied Urmia, forcing the Mamash and Mangur to flee into the mountains. In summer 1921, the Mamash, Mangur, and Piran joined the rebellion of Simko Shikak. In 1926, the Mangur joined the large tribal uprising led by Sardar Rashid, a prominent tribal leader from Ravansar, to help Abolfath Mirza Salar-ol-Dowla overthrow the Pahlavi monarchy. Many of the leaders of the Mamash, Mangur, and Piran later supported the Republic of Mahabad in 1946. However, during a dispute between the Mamash and the Barzani, eleven of the Mamash leaders were killed in February 1947.

By the early 20th century, the situation of the Bilbas began to stabilize. The Mamash mainly lived along the Iranian border with Iraq, south of Oshnavieh, estimated at 950 families by the authors of Iranshahr in 1963, and at 1,500 families by Sheikh Mardukh in 1979. They were divided into the tribes of Amir Ashayeri and Qaderi. The Piran mainly lived along the Iraqi border just below the Mamash, to the west of Mahabad, and were estimated at 750 families by Iranshahr and 600 families by Sheikh Mardukh. The Mangur mainly lived to the immediate south of Mahabad, and were estimated at 1,500 families by both the authors of Iranshahr and Sheikh Mardukh, and were divided into the tribes of Aman, Shame', Zin, Zarin, Kheder, and Morowwat. Some of the Bilbas settled down in Iraq, with the Mangur-e Zudi living mainly in twenty-six villages west of the Zarawa river, the Mangur-e Rota living in four villages on the east bank of the Zarawa near its mouth, the Mamash-e Reshka living in four villages to the north of the Mangur-e Rota, the Piran living in dozens villages such as Big Hizop and Small Hizop as well as most of the ranya district in the district of Bitwen, and the Senn and Ramk each inhabited five villages, both in the district of Bitwen.
