= Diyarbekir Eyalet =

Administrative division of the Ottoman Empire from 1515 to 1846

Arabic: إيالة ديار بكر Eyālet-i Diyār-i Bekr
- Eyalet of the Ottoman Empire
- 1515–1846
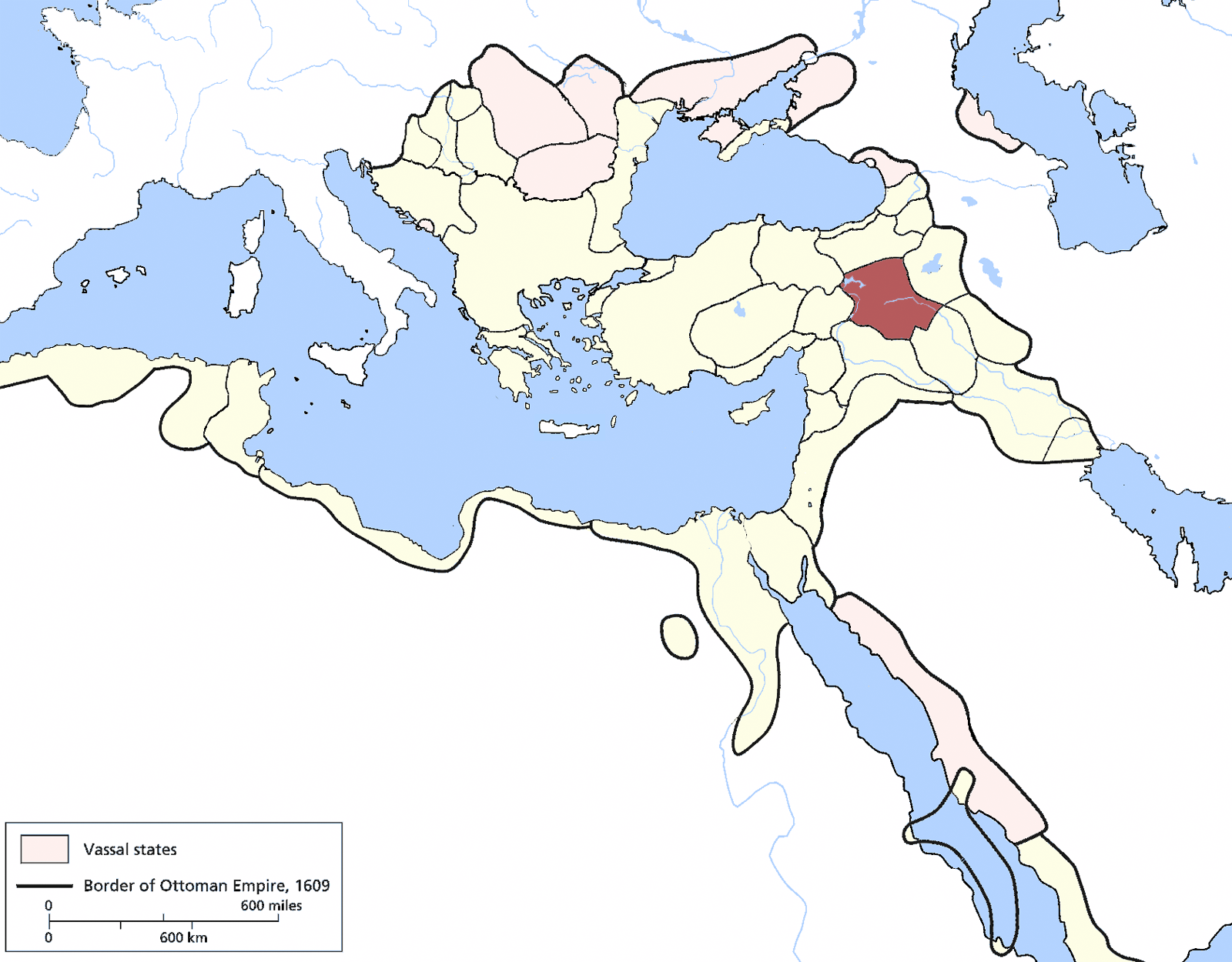
- The Diyâr-ı Bekr Eyalet in 1609
- Capital: Amid (modern Diyarbakır)
- History
  - Established: November 4, 1515 1515
  - Disestablished: 1846
Preceded by	Succeeded by
Safavid Diyarbakr	Kurdistan Eyalet; Diyâr-ı Bekr Vilayet

The Eyalet of Diyarbekir (Arabic: إيالة ديار بكر; Ottoman Turkish: ایالت دیاربكر, romanized: Eyālet-i Diyār-i Bekr) was an eyalet of the Ottoman Empire. Its reported area in the 19th century was 20,332 square miles (52,660 km^{2}), slightly larger than the original Abbasid province in Upper Mesopotamia. In 1846 it was succeeded by the Kurdistan Eyalet.

== Government ==
The 17th-century traveller Evliya Çelebi reported on the organization of the eyalet: "In this province there are nineteen sanjaks and five hükûmets (or hereditary governments) [...] eight [sanjaks] were at the time of the conquest conferred on Kurdish begs with the patent of family inheritance for ever. Like other sanjaks they are divided into ziamets and timars, the possessors of which are obliged to serve in the field; but if they do not, the ziamet or timar may be transferred to a son or relation, but not to a stranger.

The hükûmets have neither ziamets nor timars. Their governors exercise full authority, and receive not only the land revenues, but also all the other taxes which in the sanjaks are paid to the possessor of the ziamet or timar, such as the taxes for pasturage, marriages, horses, vineyards, and orchards. [...]

The officers of the divan of Diarbeker are the defterdar of the treasury with a ruz-namji (journal writer); a defterdar of the feudal forces an inspector (emin), and a lieutenant kehiya of the defter, and another for the chavushes; a secretary (katib), a colonel, and a lieutenant colonel of the militia".

== History ==
After Reşid Mehmet Pasha assumed as Wāli in 1834, he led military campaigns against the local Kurdish tribes of the Garzan, Bedir Khan and Milli as well as the Yazidi Kurds in Sinjar. In 1835 he also subdued the Milli tribe in Mardin and in 1836, he defeated the ruler from the Emirate of Soran. After his death in 1836, his successor was Hafiz Mehmet Pasha who continued to subdue the Kurdish tribes and the Yazidi Kurds in Sincar. In the 1840s, the Eyalet ceded the Sanjak of Cizre, which before was part of the Emirate of Bohtan in the Diyarbekır Eyalet, to the Mosul Eyalet, which led to a Kurdish revolt led by Bedir Khan Beg.

== Administrative divisions ==
Sanjaks between 1515-1526

1. Sanjak of Amid
2. Sanjak of Mardin
3. Sanjak of Sincar
4. Sanjak of Birecik
5. Sanjak of Ruha
6. Sanjak of Siverek
7. Sanjak of Çermik
8. Sanjak of Ergani
9. Sanjak of Harput
10. Sanjak of Arabgir
11. Sanjak of Kiğı
12. Sanjak of Çemişkezek

Sanjaks between 1526-1560

1. Sanjak of Amid
2. Sanjak of Mardin
3. Sanjak of Sincar
4. Sanjak of Ruha
5. Sanjak of Siverek
6. Sanjak of Çermik
7. Sanjak of Ergani
8. Sanjak of Harput
9. Sanjak of Arabgir
10. Sanjak of Kiğı
11. Sanjak of Çemişkezek
12. Sanjak of Musul
13. Sanjak of Hit
14. Sanjak of Deyr
15. Sanjak of Rahbe
16. Sanjak of Ane

Sanjaks after 1560

1. Sanjak of Amid
2. Sanjak of Sincar
3. Sanjak of Ruha
4. Sanjak of Siverek
5. Sanjak of Çermik
6. Sanjak of Ergani
7. Sanjak of Harput
8. Sanjak of Arabgir
9. Sanjak of Kiğı
10. Sanjak of Çemişkezek
11. Sanjak of Musul
12. Sanjak of Hit
13. Sanjak of Deyr
14. Sanjak of Rahbe
15. Sanjak of Ane

Sanjaks in the 17th century:

- Non-Hereditary Sanjaks
1. Sanjak of Harput
2. Sanjak of Ergani
3. Sanjak of Siverek
4. Sanjak of Nusaybin
5. Sanjak of Hasankeyf
6. Sanjak of Meyyafarikin
7. Sanjak of Akçakale
8. Sanjak of Habur
9. Sanjak of Sincar
- Hereditary Sanjaks
1. Sanjak of Sağman
2. Sanjak of Kulb
3. Sanjak of Mehrasi
4. Sanjak of Atak
5. Sanjak of Pertek
6. Sanjak of Çapakçur
7. Sanjak of Çermik
8. Sanjak of Tercil
- Independent Governments (Hükümetis)
1. Government of Cezire
2. Government of Eğil
3. Government of Genç
4. Government of Palu
5. Government of Hazzo

Sanjaks between 1673 and 1702

1. Sanjak of Amid
2. Government (Hükümeti) of Hazzo
3. Government (Hükümeti) of Cezire
4. Government (Hükümeti) of Eğil
5. Government (Hükümeti) of Tercil
6. Government (Hükümeti) of Palu
7. Government (Hükümeti) of Genç
8. Sanjak of Çermik
9. Sanjak of Hancûk
10. Sanjak of Pertek
11. Sanjak of Hısn-ı Keyfâ
12. Sanjak of Manazgird
13. Sanjak of Çemişgezek
14. Sanjak of Harput
15. Sanjak of Siverek
16. Sanjak of Kulb
17. Sanjak of Sağman
18. Sanjak of Ağca Kale
19. Sanjak of Dasini
20. Sanjak of Sincar

Sanjaks between 1735 and 1740

1. Sanjak of Amid
2. Government (Hükümeti) of Hazzo
3. Government (Hükümeti) of Cezire
4. Government (Hükümeti) of Eğil
5. Government (Hükümeti) of Tercil
6. Government (Hükümeti) of Palu
7. Government (Hükümeti) of Genç
8. Sanjak of Çermik
9. Sanjak of Hısn-ı Keyfâ
10. Sanjak of Kulb
11. Sanjak of Mihrani (in today Hazro District)
12. Sanjak of Sincar
13. Sanjak of Siverek
14. Sanjak of Atak

== See also ==
- Bedr Khan Beg
- Emirate of Çemişgezek
