= Emirate of Çemişgezek =

Kurdish emirate from the 13th to 16th centuries

- 13th century
- Capital: Çemişgezek
- Religion: Islam (Sunni and Shia), Christianity (Armenian Apostolic)
- Government: Monarchy
- History
  - Established: 13th century
  - Incorporation into the Ottoman Empire as ocaklık: 1515
  - Division into new sanjaks and ocaklıks: 1535
Preceded by
Sultanate of Rum
Saltukids
Artuqids
Succeeded by
Ottoman Empire

The Emirate of Çemişgezek (Note: Also known as Chamshgzak Emirate, Chemishkezek, Cemisigezek, Čamšgazak and Chamishgzakiyan.) (Kurdish: Mîrektiya Çemșgezek, Mîrektiya Melkişî) was an emirate ruled by a Kurdish dynasty and centered around Çemişgezek including Mazgirt, Pertek and Sağman. Although there is not a clear account of its establishment and the first centuries, a certain Malik Shah is credited with founding the polity during the 13th century. Following the Mongol invasions, Çemişgezek was contested and sporadically occupied by different powers, namely the Aq Qoyunlu and the Qara Qoyunlu, where the emirate initially sided with the latter.

Despite earlier animosity, emir Sheikh Hasan forged friendly relations with the Aq Qoyunlu during the second half of the 15th century. With the rise of the Safavid dynasty in Iran, Sheikh Hasan's grandson Hajji Rustam swore fealty to Ismail I (r. 1501–24) and handed over the rule to a Safavid governor. After having sided with the Safavids, who were defeated by the Ottomans at the Battle of Chaldiran in 1514, Hajji Rustam sought pardon from Selim I (r. 1512–20), who executed him. However, late Hajji Rustam's son Pir Husayn managed to secure his rule from Selim I in the form of an ocaklık (hereditary rule). Succession strife among Pir Husayn's children prompted the division of the emirate's former domains into new sanjaks (provinces), which various lines of the dynasty continued to govern under the Ottomans.

The region was inhabited by Muslims, composed of Kurdish tribes, as well as a slight majority of non-Muslims, primarily Armenians. The Kurdish population had Shiite tendencies. Some communities migrated east to Iran as Qizilbash and are claimed to be connected to the local modern-day Kurdish Alevis.

== History ==
=== Origins ===
According to Sharafnama, a 16th-century history prepared by Kurdish historian Sharafkhan Bidlisi, Malik Shah, son of Nasir al-Din Muhammad, a certain notable from the Saltukid dynasty, took over 32 fortresses and 16 nahiyah around Çemişgezek amidst a power vacuum within the Saltukid emirate and inherited the throne from his predecessor Jakdash. Malik Shah was eventually involved in a war for independence and was promptly executed by Suleiman II of the Sultanate of Rum (r. 1196–1204) in 1202. Sharafkhan stated that the ruling family descended from Malik Shah was known as Malkīsh, or Malkīshī among the Kurds through a reduction of his name. While Sharafkhan also mentioned a claim of Abbasid ancestry within the dynasty, (Note: Claims on ancestry among 16th-century Kurdish polities were tied to their political orientation. With some exceptions, claims of Abbasid or Umayyad ancestry (both of whom were Sunni) reflected an alignment with the Sunni Ottoman government, while most families claiming pre-Islamic Iranian ancestry were supporters of Safavid Iran.) he favored the hypothesis that the rulers were originally Turkic, since "their names bear no similarity with the names of the Kurds or the Arabs." While the identity of Malik Shah's successor is unknown, the rulers of Çemişgezek retained control of the region during the Mongol invasions and that of Qara Yusuf of the Qara Qoyunlu (r. 1389–1420) according to Sharafkhan.

However, the narrative provided by Sharafkhan contains several discrepancies with other sources. Although Sharafkhan cited the Jahan-ara of Ghaffari, this work lacks any mention of Malik Shah's predecessor Jakdash or Malik Shah's execution, and Malik Shah likely arrived in the region after 1202. Moreover, Kayqubad I of Rum (r. 1220–37) is known to have taken Çemişgezek from the Artuqids in 1226 and not Malik Shah or the Saltukids. While this may indicate Malik Shah ruled Çemişgezek under Artuqid overlordship during those years, no clear chronology exists for the early years of the polity in Çemişgezek.

=== Relations with Erzincan and Timur ===
In late 14th and early 15th centuries, Çemişgezek was likely occupied by or subordinate to different powers. According to Kitab-i Diyarbakriyya, Mutahharten, Emir of Erzincan (r. 1379–1403), controlled Çemişgezek when he first rose to power. Emir Yalman is first attested to in 1388 as a "protégé" of Mutahharten. The relations between the emirates of Çemişgezek and Erzincan at the time were likely influenced by the geography of the region, due to which Çemişgezek was vulnerable to any incursions by the Dulkadirids in Harpoot and the Mamluk Sultanate beyond a pass west. Yalman was probably wary of an imminent Dulkadirid attack. His alignment with Mutahharten served to protect the area as Mutahharten was under the influence of the Turco-Mongol warlord Timur, who was an enemy of the suzerain of the Dulkadirids, the Mamluks. Emir Yalman allegedly conformed to Mutahharten who, according to Bazm u Razm, personally met with Timur, changed the name in his khutba wa sikka (sermon and coins) to Timur's and kissed his stirrup. Yalman's policy of subordination to Mutahharten evidently continued through the year 1400 as indicated by inscriptions on Yalman's namesake mosque in the town of Çemişgezek, which mentioned Timur and advertised the subordinate position of the emirate to Erzincan.

=== Relations with the Aq Qoyunlu ===
In the next century, the Aq Qoyunlu Qara Yuluk (r. 1378–1429) procured control of the region from Pir Husayn. Çemişgezek fell in 1423, or earlier, as indicated by Sheikh Hasan's meeting with the Qara Qoyunlu ruler Iskandar Mirza (r. 1421–29) in 1422 when he requested for his support to regain the areas lost to the Aq Qoyunlu. An Armenian colophon dated 1435 mentions a certain Armenian named Khoshghadam as na'ib (viceroy), presumably of Çemişgezek under Qara Yuluk. Three years later, the Aq Qoyunlu-ruled town was subject to a Mamluk attack, and was annexed into the province of Aleppo. The Malkishi seemingly supported the Aq Qoyunlu prince Hamza during a civil war that broke out among Qara Yuluk's successors.

The rule of the Malkishi family suddenly ceased with the rise of the Aq Qoyunlu ruler Uzun Hasan (r. 1452–78), who wished to eliminate Kurdish dynasties who were aligned with the Qara Qoyunlu according to Sharafkhan. Uzun Hasan assigned the Kharbandalu Turkmen tribe to subdue Çemişgezek, which changed hands back to the Aq Qoyunlu. However, Sheikh Hasan organized an army from his subjects and successfully recovered control of the region. In 1452, Sheikh Hasan's aspirations to seize the fortresses of Gobrak and Vibrak on the western frontier with the Dulkadirids elicited a counter-offensive with thirty-thousand troops led by Suleiman (r. 1442–54), who was forced to retreat to Harpoot when the local forces sortied and flanked the Dulkadirid army.

In 1456, Sheikh Hasan conversely supported Uzun Hasan at a battle on the Tigris. Three years later, Sheikh Hasan further strengthened the alliance by marrying his granddaughter (through his son Sohrab) to the Aq Qoyunlu Sultan Khalil (r. 1478). From that date, the Malkishi may be considered an integral part of the Aq Qoyunlu, a rare example of "Turkmen-Kurdish association" before the emergence of Safavid Iran. In 1461, Sheikh Hasan escorted the envoy led by Uzun Hasan's mother Sara Khatun tasked with discussing the question of the Empire of Trebizond with the Ottoman sultan Mehmed II (r. 1444–46, 1451–81). Although the envoy's goal was to prevent Mehmed II from attacking Trebizond at the behest of Uzun Hasan's Trapezuntine wife Despina Khatun, it was unsuccessful in shifting Mehmed II's plans. Sheikh Hasan's son and successor Sohrab continued to serve his son-in-law Sultan Khalil until the latter's death in 1478. There is no surviving detailed account of Sohrab's rule, which was possibly short-lived. During the reign of the Aq Qoyunlu overlord, Yaqub (r. 1478–90), Khalid Beg, Emir of Pazuki, made himself the "master" of Çemişgezek.

=== Alignment with the Safavids ===
Hajji Rustam Beg took power after his father Sohrab. Ismail I (r. 1501–24) assigned Nur-Ali Khalifa to seize Çemişgezek, and Hajji Rustam submitted himself without any warfare. He traveled to Ismail's palace, declaring his loyalty. Ismail gifted him a robe of honour and appointed him as governor of some area in Iraq. The Kurdish-Turkmen rivalry over land worsened as Qizilbash dominance increased with the appointment of the Turkmen Qizilbash Mohammad Khan Ustajlu to Diyar Bakr, which pushed the Kurdish lords of Çemişgezek and other areas to revolt, just before the arrival of the Ottomans. Moreover, Nur-Ali Khalifa fared poorly with the locals and exterminated a significant portion of the Malkishi family. About when Hajji Rustam was informed of the news, there was an impending battle between the Safavids and the Ottomans, where Hajji Rustam sided with the former. However, Ismail was defeated at the Battle of Chaldiran by the Ottoman sultan Selim I (r. 1512–20) in 1514. Following the defeat, Hajji Rustam instead traveled to Yam, located near Marand, to declare his loyalty to Selim. The Aq Qoyunlu prince Farruhshad had recently reminded the latter of Hajji Rustam's failure to hand over Kemah to the Ottomans prior to the Battle of Otlukbeli in 1473. Selim thus executed 40 people from the Malkishi family, including Hajji Rustam, due to this reason as claimed by Sharafkhan but also likely due to his support of the Safavids at the recent battle.

=== Incorporation into Ottoman rule ===
On his way to take refuge in Mamluk Egypt following his father's execution, Pir Husayn consulted with Mamay, the Mamluk emir of Malatya, who noted the impending fall of the Mamluks and suggested Pir Husayn appear before Selim. Pir Husayn thus traveled to Amasya and submitted himself to Selim, who allowed him to govern Çemişgezek. Although Selim was rumored to have been impressed by Pir Husayn's bravery, the probable reason for Selim's pardon was to garner Kurdish support against the Safavid commander Qara Khan Ustajlu, who was active in the area. In the summer of 1515, Idris Bitlisi had, on behalf of the Ottoman Empire, mobilized a Kurdish army including from Çemişgezek to fight the Aq Qoyunlu and the Safavids to recapture Diyarbakir. The Kurdish army was joined by Ottoman troops from Amasya marching together towards Diyarbakir and succeeded in capturing the city by mid-September same year. The army subsequently went on to capture Mardin, and defeated the Qizilbash in Kızıltepe in 1516. The Kurds played a crucial role in the victory and were rewarded richly by Bıyıklı Mehmed Pasha who would become the first governor of Diyarbekir Eyalet and fostered good relations with the Kurds in the region. Diyarbekir Eyalet would include the Emirate of Çemişgezek. The Emirate of Çemişgezek was one of the two Kurdish emirates mentioned in a defter in 1518, the other being in Çermik.

Pir Husayn appeared as the sanjak-bey of Çemişgezek in the 1518 tahrir defter and was likely so since 1515. Although Pir Husayn's exact death year is unknown, it was likely c. 1534 or 1535. Around that time, a certain Ali from the Dulkadirid dynasty was made the sanjak-bey for a brief period.

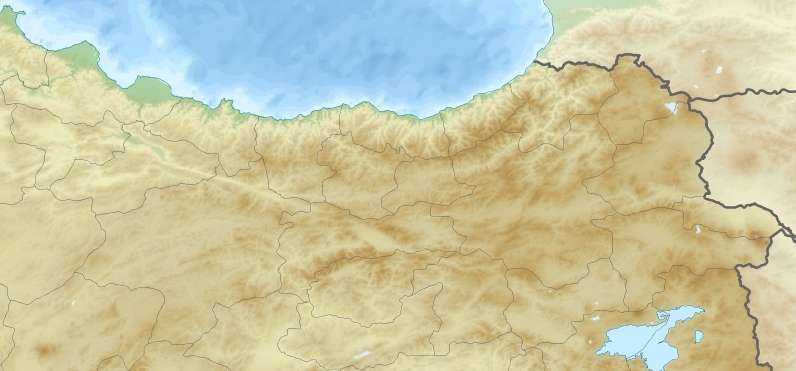
The locations of the aforementioned towns.

Pir Husayn's death signaled the start of a succession strife between his sixteen sons, which Suleiman the Magnificent (r. 1520–66) intervened. The Sultan incorporated the revenue of Çemişgezek town, the poll-tax of non-Muslims (haraç), the sheep tax (adet-i ağnam) and the entire revenue of the villages that looked promising into the imperial domains. The remaining timar and ziamet were divided between each son and the land thus remained hereditary in the form of an ocaklık. In 1597, by the time Bidlisi wrote Sharafnama, the family was still in control over the region.

== Population ==
After taking over the region, the Ottomans conducted several detailed censuses on the tax potential of the region. According to the tahrir defters of the 16th-century, the Christian populace, primarily Armenians, maintained a majority among the taxable population. During this and prior centuries, the Christian population showed a high degree of migration to urban centers, which may have been due to increased concerns on security due to the presence of many Kurdish Muslim tribes in the rural parts of the region. The Christian populace also emigrated to other provinces due to lack of economic opportunities, as well as persecution by the local tribes, which was mentioned in the 1541 kanunname (law code).

Taxable population distribution by religion (1518–1566)
Category	1518		1523		1541		1566	
Category	Households	Single men	Households	Single men	Households	Single men	Households	Single men
Urban
Muslims	50 (20%)	5 (6%)	94 (29%)	16 (22%)	227 (40%)	35 (19%)	225 (41%)	77 (44%)
Non-Muslims	200 (80%)	80 (94%)	235 (71%)	68 (78%)	344 (60%)	150 (81%)	319 (59%)	100 (56%)
Rural
Muslims	3022 (48.6%)	665 (36.4%)	2741 (43%)	299 (28.5%)	4754 (47.1%)	2163 (44.4%)	1277 (27.1%)	739 (44.3%)
Non-Muslims	3186 (51.3%)	1161 (63.5%)	3625 (57%)	749 (71.4%)	5320 (52.8%)	2699 (55.5%)	3420 (72.8%)	929 (55.6%)
Total
Muslims	3072 (47.5%)	670 (35%)	2835 (42.3%)	315 (27.8%)	4981 (46.7%)	2198 (43.5%)	1502 (28.6%)	816 (44.2%)
Non-Muslims	3386 (52.4%)	1241 (65%)	3855 (57.6%)	817 (72.1%)	5664 (53.2%)	2849 (56.4%)	3739 (71.3%)	1029 (55.7%)

The Ottoman tax registers additionally attest to the Kurdish tribes of Behramlu, Disimlu, Hasirlu, Qizil Magharalu, Zervereklu, and Sheikh Umarlu present in the region. Although some local tribes had Shiite tendencies and were collectively described as Qizilbash (Shia militants) by Sharafkhan, there are no details on such tribes from Çemişgezek in Safavid Iranian sources. Regardless, the tribe of "Chamishgazaklu" is conventionally listed as one of the three Kurdish Qizilbash tribes. The better-attested Qizilbash tribe of Arabgirlu was originally from the adjacent district around Arapgir, which according to the anonymous 17th-century history Tarikh-i Qizilbashan, belonged to Çemişgezek. Despite the Twelver Shi'ite belief of Khorasani Kurdish communities who trace their roots to this region, the religious continuity is unclear in relation to the population in Çemişgezek, who view Shi'ism as a heresy instead of through religious lenses. While there is no direct evidence linking Safavid-era Qizilbash tribes to modern-day local Kurdish Alevis, these groups are claimed to be offshoots of the same movement, and the relative autonomy obtained by the locals likely allowed Kurdish Alevism to expand in influence.

== Architecture ==
The Yelmaniye Mosque, also known as the Medrese Mosque, in the town of Çemişgezek was built by the namesake local emir Yalman in 1400. The current prayer hall was possibly inspired by the early 16th-century version of its architecture, the rest of the madrasa (school), which stood north of the mosque, was lost. The old hammam of Çemişgezek dates back to the last quarter of the 15th century and was presumably built by the Aq Qoyunlu Yaqub, though the building was repaired in 1762–63.

== Territory ==
Per Sharafkhan, Çemişgezek's territory contained "32 fortresses", and it was considered vast as it was a "synonym for Kurdistan" according to Sharafkhan. The same implication could be drawn from Ebu'l Fazl Efendi's use of the phrase Kurdistan-i Chamishgazak.

== List of rulers ==
Name	Laqab and nisba	Reign	Notes
Malik Shah		1202 – ?	Successor unknown.
Khalid	al-Kurdi	?	
Kayqubad		?	
Yalman	al-Malik al-Adil; Taj al-Din	?	
Pir Husayn		?	
Sheikh Hasan		?	
Sohrab		?	
Hajji Rustam		? – 1514	
Pir Husayn II		1515 – 1535	

== See also ==
- List of Kurdish dynasties and countries
- Emirate of Hasankeyf

== Bibliography ==
- Alsancaklı, Sacha (1 January 2021). "Warriors, Kings, and Caliphs: Questions of Origins and Dynastic Culture in Sixteenth and Seventeenth-Century Kurdistan". C. U. Werner, M. Szuppe, N. Michel, A. Fuess (Eds.), Families, Authority, and the Transmission of Knowledge in the Early Modern Middle East.
- Atmaca, Metin (2021). "Negotiating Political Power in the Early Modern Middle East: Kurdish Emirates between the Ottoman Empire and Iranian Dynasties (Sixteenth to Nineteenth Centuries)". In Bozarslan, Hamit (ed.). Cambridge History of the Kurds. Cambridge University Press.
- Aydin, Suavi (2020). "A Survey of the Roots and History of Kurdish Alevism: What are the Divergences and Convergences between Kurdish Alevi Groups in Turkey?". Kurdish Studies. 8 (1). CEEOL: 17–42. doi:10.33182/ks.v8i1.551. S2CID 219734521.
- Dehqan, Mustafa; Genç, Vural (2024). "The Qizilbash Reconsidered: The Role of the Kurdish Arabgirlu Tribe in the Early Safavid State". In Winter, Stéfan; HajHasan, Zainab (eds.). Syrian-Kurdish Intersections in the Ottoman Period. University of Toronto Press. ISBN 978-1487554408.
- Gezik, Erdal (2021). "The Kurdish Alevis: The Followers of the Path of Truth". In Bozarslan, Hamit (ed.). The Cambridge History of the Kurds. Cambridge University Press. doi:10.1017/9781108623711.026.
- Minorsky, Vladimir (1986). "Kurds, Kurdistān". In Bosworth, C. E.; van Donzel, E.; Lewis, B. & Pellat, Ch. (eds.). The Encyclopaedia of Islam, Second Edition. Volume V: Khe–Mahi. Leiden: E. J. Brill. pp. 438–486. ISBN 978-90-04-07819-2.
- Sanjian, Avedis K. (5 February 1969). Colophons of Armenian Manuscripts, 1301-1480, A Source for Middle Eastern History (PDF). Cambridge, Massachusetts: Harvard University Press. ISBN 9780674432611. OCLC 54310.
- Sinclair, T. A. (31 December 1989). Eastern Turkey: An Architectural and Archaeological Survey. Vol. 3. Pindar Press. ISBN 9781904597766. OCLC 891394716.
- Sinclair, Thomas (6 December 2019). Eastern Trade and the Mediterranean in the Middle Ages: Pegolotti’s Ayas-Tabriz Itinerary and its Commercial Context. Routledge. ISBN 978-1-000-75267-0. OCLC 1119066538.
- Ünal, Mehmet Ali (1999). XVI. yüzyılda Çemişgezek sancağı (in Turkish). Türk Tarih Kurumu Basımevi.
- Ünal, Mehmet Ali (1991). "XVI. Yüzyılda Mazgird, Pertek ve Sağman Sancakbeyîleri – Pir Hüseyin Bey Oğulları". Ankara Üniversitesi Osmanlı Tarihi Araştırma ve Uygulama Merkezi Dergisi (in Turkish) (2): 239–267.
- van Bruinessen, Martin; Boeschoten, Hendrik (1988). Evliya Çelebi in Diyarbekir. Brill Publishers. ISBN 9004081658.
- van Bruinessen, Martin (1 January 1992). Agha, Shaikh and State: The Social and Political Structures of Kurdistan.
- Woods, John E. (1999). The Aqquyunlu: Clan, Confederation, Empire. New York.
- Yinanç, Refet (1989). Dulkadir Beyliği (in Turkish). Ankara: Turkish Historical Society Press. ISBN 9751601711. OCLC 21676736.
- Yücel, Yaşar [in Turkish] (October 1971). "Mutahharten ve Erzincan Emirliği" [Mutahharten and the Emirate of Erzincan]. Belleten (in Turkish). 35 (140): 665–719. ISSN 2791-6472.
