= Diyarbakır (disambiguation) =

Diyarbakır is a city in Turkey.

Diyarbakır may also refer to:

- Diyar Bakr, a historical province
- Diyarbakır Airport, an airport in Turkey
- Diyarbakır Archaeological Museum, a museum in Turkey
- Diyarbakır Fortress, a historic fortress in Sur, Turkey
- Diyarbakır oil field, an oilfield in Turkey
- Diyarbakır Prison, a prison in Turkey
- Diyarbakır Province, a province of Turkey
- Diyarbakır railway station, a railway station in Turkey
- Diyarbakır Stadium, a stadium in Turkey
