= Emirate of Hasankeyf =

Kurdish Emirate of Hasankeyf

Hasankeyf Emirate (1232–1524, (Note: Meinecke puts the year of Ottoman submission as 1516.) Kurdish: Mîrektiya Melîkan) was a Kurdish emirate centered around Hasankeyf and ruled by descendants of the Ayyubid dynasty until its dissolution in 1524. They considered their emirate as the last remnant of the Ayyubid state. The rulers were called ‘amlak’ (kings) and continued to lead the emirate from 1232 to 1524 despite invasions and different sovereigns.

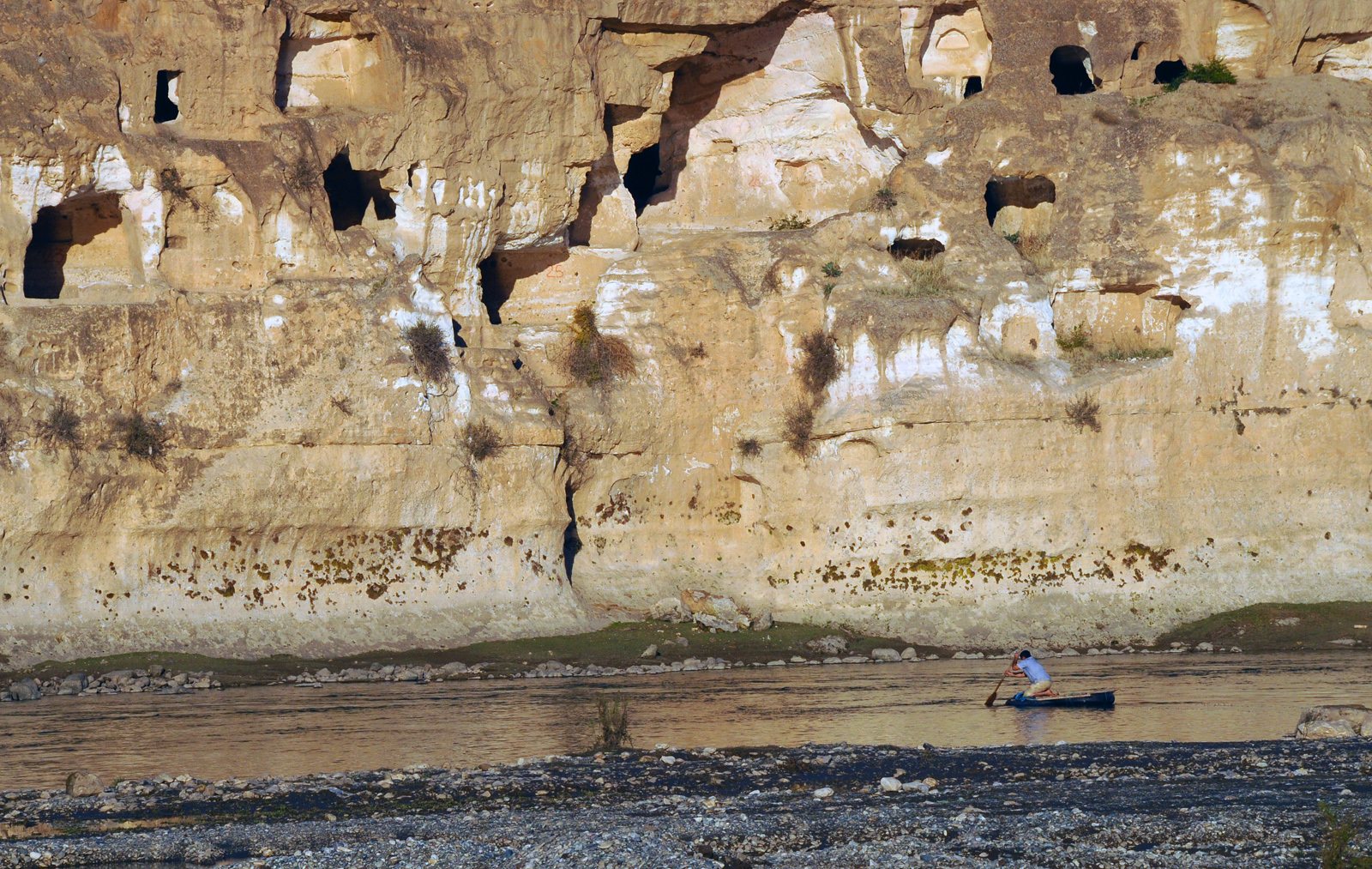
Rock caves near Hasankeyf which the locals fled towards during the Timurid invasion.

The period from the 13th century to the 16th century witnessed the construction of various architectural structures, mostly pertaining to Islamic architecture. Topographer Izz al-Din ibn Shaddad noted, arguably before 1259, that the emirate had three madrasas, four hammams, mausolea, bazaars, caravanserais, mosques and citadels. Around the citadel, there was a town square and fields for wheat, barley and grain growth. However, the living standard took a turn for the worse with the Timurid invasion with most of the local inhabitants fleeing towards the rock caves for safety. Even the Tigris bridge was unusable in this period. Only after a peace agreement was signed between Al-Nasir Muhammad and Abu Sa'id Bahadur Khan in the first part of the 14th century did the emirate prosper again and construction resumed.

The emirate had established several charities which supported educational matters and scholars from the fields of music, poetry and literacy settled in the emirate. Several emirs also collected scholarly works and established libraries for research.

== History ==
When Timur reached Hasankeyf, the melik of the emirate was Ashraf who submitted himself fully to the Timurid Empire. The rule of Melik Ashraf is described as long and quiet. He was succeeded by his son Khalil who had the unanimous support from all tribes of Hasankeyf and he also pleaded his loyalty to the Timurid Empire who was now led by Shah Rukh, the son of Timur. When Shah Rukh was fighting the Qara Qoyunlu in Van, Melik Khalil also went to pay homage to the Timurid ruler. The rule of Melik Khalil is described as a period of happiness and peace. When Melik Khalil died, he was succeeded by his nephew Khalaf who went to war against the Kurdish tribes of Cizre. The rule of Melik Khalaf would come to an end when Uzun Hasan of the Aq Qoyunlu besieged Hasankeyf. During this besiege, Melik Khalaf was assassinated by a nephew who afterwards opened the gates to the invaders. The nephew did not get to rule the emirate which was handed over to a Turkish chieftain.

The brother of Melik Khalaf, Khalil, who had fled to Syria during the events, returned to Hasankeyf with the assistance of the Shirwi tribe whose chiefs worked as viziers for the emirate. Various tribes joined Khalil and they triumphed in taking over not only Hasankeyf but also Siirt from the Aq Qoyunlu. The new Melik Khalil now maintained full independence and he was incomparable with other rulers in Kurdistan. Nonetheless, he was taking prisoner during a visit to the Safavid Shah Ismail I. The Qizilbash then took control over the emirate and handed over the area to Bejnewi tribe. However, Melik Khalil managed to escape during the Battle of Chaldiran in 1514 and united the people of Hasankeyf as he retook Siirt with Hasankeyf. The Bejnewi tribe was not persecuted but received a village in compensation for the killing of the father of their chieftain.

The hereditary rule of the Emirate of Hasankeyf would come to an end with the death of Melik Khalil. The rivalry among his four sons dovetailed with tribal anger resulted in the hand-over of the emirate to Deli Husrev Pasha, the Ottoman governor of Diyarbakir. The Ottomans ultimately dissolved the emirate.

== List of rulers ==
The following is a list of Ayyubid emirs of Hasankeyf:

- al-Malik as-Salih Najm al-Din Ayyub I (1236–1239)
- al-Malik al-Muazzam Turanshah (1239–1249)
- al-Malik al-Muwahhid Abd Allah (1249–?)
- al-Kamil Abu Bakr Sayf al-Din Shadi
- al-Malik as-Salih Najm al-Din Ayyub II (?–1324/1325)
- Ghazi Muhammad ibn Abi Bakr (1324/1325–1364)
- al-Malik al-Adil Abu al-Mafakhir Fakhr al-Din Sulayman (1364–1424)
- al-Ashraf Ahmad (1424–1432)
- al-Kamil Abu al-Mahamid Khalil (1432–1452)
- al-Malik Ahmad (1452–1455)
- Khalaf ibn Muhammad (1455–1461)
- al-Malik Ayyub III ibn Ali ibn Muhammad (1461–1462)

Aq Qoyunlu occupation (1462–?)

- al-Malik Khalil
- al-Malik al-Hasan (?–1525)

== See also ==
- Emirate of Çemişgezek
- Principality of Bohtan

== Bibliography ==
- Barsoum, Aphrem (2008). The History of Tur Abdin. Translated by Matti Moosa. Gorgias Press.
- Bruinessen, Martin Van (1992). Agha, Shaikh and State The Social and Political Structures of Kurdistan. Atlantic Highlands: Zed Books. ISBN 978-1856490184.
- Eppel, Michael (2018), Gunter, M. Michael (ed.), The Kurdish emirates: Obstacles or precursors to Kurdish nationalism?, Routledge, ISBN 9781317237983
- Ghereghlou, Kioumars (2015). "Cashing in on land and privilege for the welfare of the shah: Monetisation of tiyūl in early Safavid Iran and eastern Anatolia" (PDF). Acta Orientalia Academiae Scientiarum Hungaricae. 68 (1): 87–141. doi:10.1556/AOrient.68.2015.1.5.
- Maisel, Sebastian (30 June 2018), The Kurds: An Encyclopedia of Life, Culture, and Society, ABC-CLIO, ISBN 978-1-4408-4257-3
- Meinecke, Michael (1996), Patterns of Stylistic Changes in Islamic Architecture: Local Traditions Versus Migrating Artists, NYU Press, ISBN 9780814754924
