= Old Bridge, Hasankeyf =

Old Bridge, Hasankeyf Eski Köprü
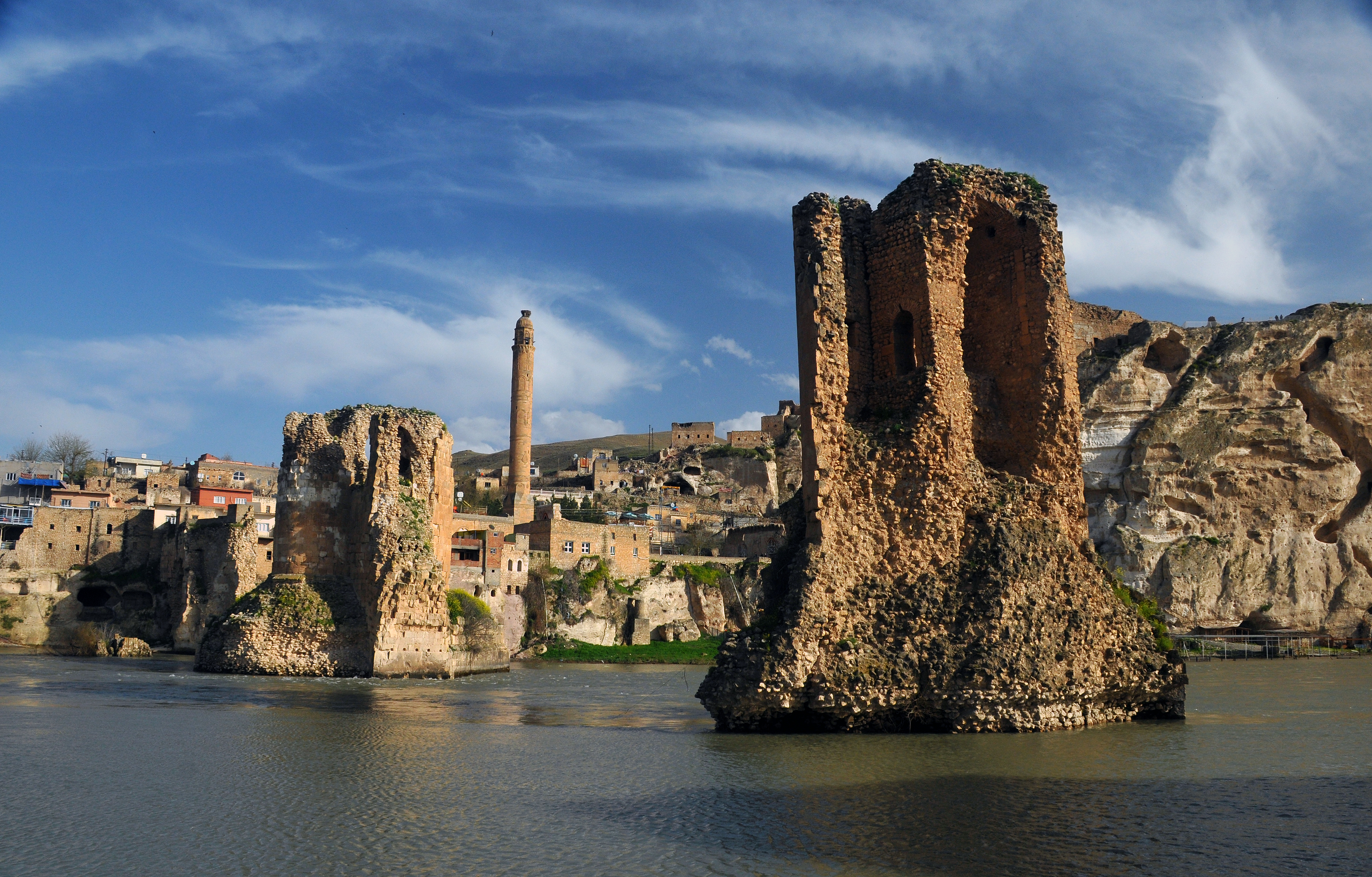
- The piers of Hasankeyf's Old Bridge over the Tigris river, as seen in 2012. Since 2020 they have been submerged underwater due to the completion of the Ilısu Dam.
- Coordinates: 37°42′52″N 41°24′40″E
- Crossed: Tigris River
- Locale: Hasankeyf, Batman Province, Eastern Anatolia region, Turkey
- Other name: (Old) Tigris Bridge

Characteristics
- Design: Arch bridge
- Material: Stone masonry and rubble, with some brick and wood
- Total length: 200 m (660 ft)
- Longest span: approx. 40 m (130 ft)
- No. of spans: 4
- Piers in water: 2

History
- Construction start: after 541 AH (1146/1147 CE)
- Construction end: before 562 AH (1166/1167 CE)
- Collapsed: before 1673

Location
- Interactive map of Old Bridge, Hasankeyf

The Old Bridge (Turkish: Eski Köprü), also known as the Old Tigris Bridge, is a ruined four-arch bridge spanning the Tigris River in the town of Hasankeyf in Batman Province in southeastern Turkey. It was built by the Artuqid Turkmens in the mid-12th century, between about 1147 and 1167, and at the time its central arch was one of the largest in the world, if not the largest. The bridge was repaired by Ayyubid Kurdish and Aq Qoyunlu Turkmen rulers during the 14th and 15th centuries and appears to have eventually collapsed in the early or mid-17th century. The bridge's ruined piers still stand (two of them in the Tigris River), as does one arch. Since 2020 the ruins of the bridge, along with most of the town of Hasankeyf, have been submerged underwater by the filling of the Ilısu Dam reservoir.

== Background ==
In Roman times, Kepha (Hasankeyf) was a base for legionnaires on the frontier with Persia, and for a time the capital of the Roman province of Arzanene. The existence of a Roman bridge across the Tigris at Hasankeyf has been viewed as "highly probable" by one scholar who speculates that (like the later bridge) it may have had "a wooden superstructure based on piers of masonry and natural stone". However, none of the remaining structure of the bridge appears to date from Roman times.

Roman builders had trouble bridging major rivers that were subject to spring flooding, such as the Tigris. Nevertheless, there was at least one bridge across the Tigris upstream from Hasankeyf as early as the fifth century AD, when Bishop John Saʿoro of Amida (who was appointed in 483/484) is reported to have built the bridge that forms the foundation of the present-day On Gözlü Köprü outside Diyarbakır. (Note: Palmer notes that the Chronicle of 819 records Saʿoro's appointment as Bishop of Amida in AG 795. Syriac chronicles typically used dates based on the Anno Graecorum, or Seleucid era, which started on 1 October 312 BC of the Julian calendar. That dates the Bishop's appointment between AD 1 October 483 and 30 September 484. It is not clear exactly when Saʿoro built the bridge across the Tigris outside Diyarbakır, but Palmer says he saw a photograph of an inscription on a basalt block that is exposed only in late summer that reads "In the year eight [hundred]" and implies that construction began in the fifth century.) There may have been bridges across the Tigris even closer to Hasankeyf, as surveys in 1989–1991 showed evidence of two bridges crossing the Tigris near its confluence with the Batman River, 36 km (22 mi) upstream from Hasankeyf. One was a probably Roman bridge at Köprüköy, 6 km (3.7 mi) upstream from the rivers' confluence; three piers of this bridge remain, but it can only be dated approximately. The second was a possibly neo-Assyrian bridge at Şahinli, slightly downstream of the confluence; only some stones of the southern footing remain on the riverbank, near Hirbemerdon Tepe.

The earliest mention of any bridge across the Tigris at Hasankeyf is in an account of the Muslim conquest of Mesopotamia in 638. Over the subsequent five centuries, Hasankeyf was ruled by the Umayyad and Abbasid caliphates and later by semi-autonomous Hamdanid and Marwanid rulers. There is little information on river crossings at Hasankeyf during this period. The late-10th-century Arab geographer al-Muqaddasi describes Hisn Kayfa as a "place of abundance" with a strong citadel and many churches, whose residents get their drinking water from the Tigris, but makes no mention of a bridge. In the 11th century, Seljuq Turks and their Turkmen and Oguz allies moved into eastern Anatolia, culminating in the Seljuq defeat of Byzantine forces at the Battle of Manzikert in 1071. Victory at Manzikert quickly resulted in Seljuq forces controlling large parts of Anatolia and northern Mesopotamia. The Seljuq sultan Rukn ad-Dīn Barkiyāruq granted Hasankeyf as a fief to the Artuqids in 495 AH (1101/1102 CE).

Control of trade along the Diyarbakır–Mosul route down the Tigris, and north–south between Lake Van and the Euphrates generated prosperity for the Artuqids and ensured their power in the region. Consequently, the existence of a reliable river crossing for goods and people was a priority.

== Construction and Artuqid period ==
=== Date ===
Current scholarship suggests the bridge was built in the mid-12th century, no earlier than 1147 and no later than 1167.

Late 19th- and early 20th-century scholars generally dated its construction to the year AH 510 (1116/17), and described the bridge as being rebuilt on the site of some undescribed earlier bridge. Most scholars of the time traced this date to an anonymous writer who annotated what is now known as the Paris manuscript of Ibn Hawqal's Surat al-Ard some time after AH 534 (1139/40). The English geographical historian Guy Le Strange, using the Ibn Hawqal annotation as his source, specifically says the bridge was restored by Qarā Arslān in AH 510 (1116/17). The same reconstruction date was given by Henry Hoyle Howorth, citing the Hamdanid ruler Sayf al-Dawla.

Support for the AH 510 dating waned after closer reading of a pair of manuscripts by the 12th-century Artuqid historian ibn al-Azraq al-Fariqi held by the British Library. Ibn al-Azraq writes that the bridge was built on the orders of Fakhr ad-Din Qara Arslan of the Artuqid dynasty. Ibn al-Azraq also states that the Hasankeyf bridge was built later than the Malabadi Bridge, the earliest in the Diyar Bakr. Construction of the Malabadi Bridge started in AH 541 (1146/47) under the Artuqid ruler of Mardin, Husam al-Din Timurtash, and finished in AH 548 (1153/54) under his son Najm ad-Din Alpi. A date later than AH 541 (1146/47) for the Hasankeyf bridge is consistent with Qara Arslan's sponsoring its construction, as his accession is variously dated to AH 539 or 543 (1144/45 or 1148/49) and he ruled Hasankeyf until AH 562 (1166/67). (Note: Meinecke actually gives AH 579 as the date of Qara Arslan's accession, but the Gregorian date 1144 makes clear he intended AH 539. He gives AH 567 for the end of Qara Arslan's reign, but the Gregorian date 1167 makes clear this should be AH 562 in line with other scholars.)

In a 1994 overview of Seljuk and Ottoman bridges, Fügen İlter dated the bridge to between 1155 and 1175.

There is also conflicting information from the same primary sources about whether the Hasankeyf bridge was built entirely new, or was rebuilt from an earlier structure. The German historian of Islamic art Michael Meinecke quotes Ibn al-Azraq's report that the bridge was a replacement for an earlier and less substantial one. Le Strange (citing the annotator of Ibn Hawqal) says it was "restored"; Howorth (citing Sayf al-Dawla) says it was "re-erected".

=== Construction ===
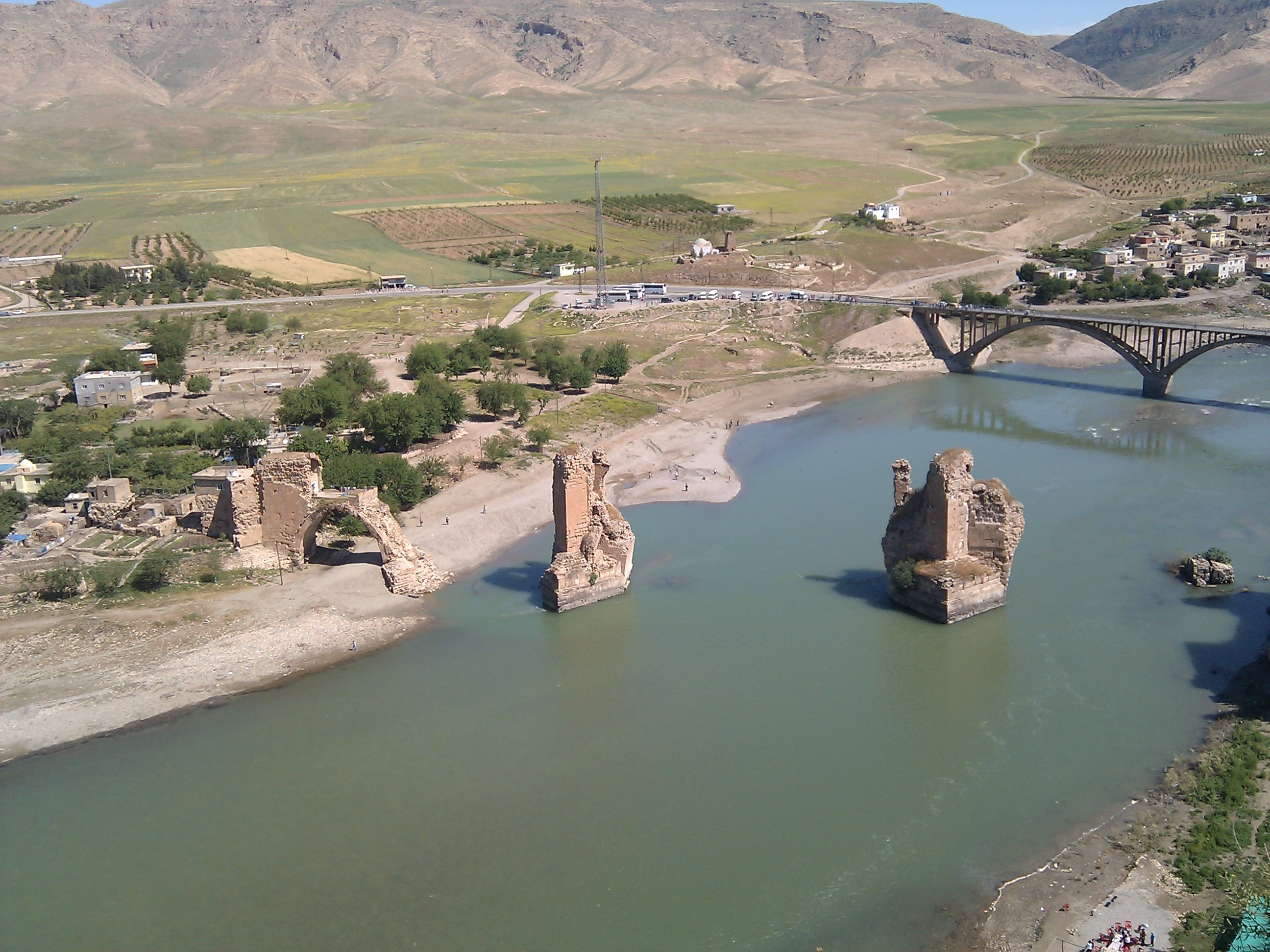
A view of the Old Bridge from upstream, looking east. Beyond it is the new bridge, built in 1967.

The bridge had four main arches. Two huge piers were built in the river to support the 40 m (130 ft)-wide main arch. Again, there is some confusion as to how this main arch was built. Some scholars describe it as a wooden construction anchored into the stone piers and describe the purpose as being to allow the crossing to be easily dismantled in time of war. Other sources, including several from the period before the bridge was destroyed, do not mention a wooden element, despite providing a detailed description of the bridge. And one 17th-century source that does mention a wooden central span describes it as a repair due to an earlier collapse.

However it was built, this central arch had a span of about 40 m (130 ft). That was about 1.4 m (4.6 ft) larger than the nearby Malabadi Bridge, which means it probably had the largest span of any single arch from the time of its construction until completion of the Pont du Diable in the Principality of Catalonia (now France) in 1341.

The roadway of the bridge rose from the north bank (where it is just above the flood plain) to the south bank (where it meets the top of the cliff on which the lower city sits). Flanking the main arch were slightly smaller arches to the north and south, with the roadway climbing towards the center of the bridge. A fourth arch, smaller than the others and the only one still remaining somewhat intact, carried the roadway to the northern abutment. At the south, where the roadway meets the steep slope up to the citadel, there was no need for a corresponding fifth arch, and the flanking arch led directly to the massive masonry construction of the abutment. The southern abutment is pierced by an arched gateway, and it appears that some writers have counted this as a fifth structural arch.

Meinecke describes the bridge as a whole as being "a unique masterpiece of architectural engineering". The total length from one abutment to the other is about 200 m (660 ft). Meinecke notes that the sides of the bridge contained passages that could accommodate townspeople on both sides of the river in case of emergency. The presence of arrow slits indicates that these passages had a defensive purpose.

=== Decoration ===
On the western (upstream) faces of the triangular buttresses is a series of reliefs that have been interpreted by Estelle Whelan as Qarā Arslān's khāṣṣakiyya (his page corps or bodyguard). Five reliefs remain out of a total that Whelan estimates was originally eight, two on each of the four upstream walls of the two main piers. Each shows a single human figure carved on a vertical block and set into the middle course of masonry. The western pier shows a standing human figure wearing a kaftan, boots and hat known as a sharbush. His bent arms rest on a straight object that may be an arrow or a mace. A figure on the inner wall of the same pier rests on a bow and the other figure on this wall holds a bird.

In early 2018, as the Turkish government prepared to fill the lake behind the Ilısu Dam, four of the reliefs were moved to the garden of the Batman provincial museum.

=== Comparison with contemporary bridges ===
Meinecke compares the style of the bridge in Hasankeyf to that of two other bridges: Malabadi Bridge (built AH 541–548 (1146/47–1153/54)) over the Batman River about 60 km (37 mi) north of Hasankeyf on the orders of the Artuqid ruler Husam al-Din Timurtash, and a bridge in Cizre (built before AH 558 (1162/63) on the orders of the vizier of Mosul, Jamal ad-Din Muhammad al-Isfahani. Meinecke records Ibn al-Azraq's statement that the Hasankeyf bridge was modeled on Malabadi Bridge, but does not explain how the Hasankeyf Bridge apparently predates the Malabadi one. All three bridges contain similar panels of figural designs, and follow a similar pattern of construction. Meinecke also notes that the Hasankeyf and Cizre bridges display similar Artuqid mason's marks, as does the Great Palace in the Hasankeyf citadel.

Describing the bridge at Hasankeyf in the Mu'jam Al-Buldan ("Dictionary of Countries", 1224–1228), the Arab geographer Yaqut al-Hamawi wrote: "I have not seen a bigger [bridge] in any of the lands I have traveled." Yaqut describes the bridge as having a single great arch over two smaller ones, a description that may have been intended to indicate the flanking arches.

== Rebuilding during Ayyubid and Aq Qoyunlu periods ==
Ḥasan Ibn al-Munshiʾ records in the Taʾrīkh bait Aiyūb (822 AH (1419/1420 CE)) that by the early 14th century the bridge was unusable. It was restored during the reign of the Ayyubid sultan al-ʿĀdil Ghāzī, AH 742–768 (1341–1367).

There is evidence that additional repairs were made around 878 AH (1473/1474 CE) when Hasankeyf was under the rule of the powerful Aq Qoyunlu bey Uzun Hassan who had conquered Hasankeyf from the Ayyubids in 1462. Historian Thomas Alexander Sinclair dates the brick repairs on the surviving northern arch to the Aq Qoyunlu period. Meinecke sees the presence of brick masonry, and turquoise glazed bricks in particular, as evidence that the repairs were performed by a group of Iranian craftsmen who also worked on the nearby Tomb of Zeynel Bey along with local stonemasons. Meinecke speculates that the leaders of the Iranian workshop included Pīr Ḥasan b. ustādh ʿAbd ar-Raḥmān, whose name is inscribed on the tiles of the Zeynel Bey Tomb's entrance niche. He believes they operated as craftsmen-for-hire and traces their route from work on the Blue Mosque in Tabrīz before 870 AH (1465/1466 CE), to Istanbul's Çinili Köşk in 877 AH (1472/1473 CE), and then to the tomb and bridge in Hasankeyf around 878 AH (1473/1474 CE), before moving on to the south iwan of Isfahan's Masjid-i Jumʿa in 880 AH (1475/1476 CE).

A Venetian merchant who traveled to Hasankeyf around 1507 provides a detailed description of the bridge: (Note: The merchant's account was published in the second volume of Giovanni Battista Ramusio's Delle Navigationi et Viaggi in 1559. An English translation was published in 1873 as "A narrative of Italian travels in Persia, in the fifteenth and sixteen centuries".)

Going to the city from this market, one crosses the river on a magnificent stone bridge, which is wonderfully built, and in my opinion has no superior. It has five lofty, wide, solid arches; (Note: The merchant may have counted the window in the southern abutment as the fifth arch.) the one in the middle is built on a firm foundation of stones, two and three paces (Note: The Italian term here is passo which translates literally as "pace", and was a measurement of about 1.74 m (5.7 ft) in medieval Italy.) long and more than one pace broad. This foundation is so large that it is about twenty paces in circumference, made in the form of a column, and sustains the central arch, being fixed in the middle of the river. The arch is so wide and lofty that a vessel of three hundred tons, (Note: Lord Stanley's edition translates trecento botti as "three hundred tons". However, the botta as used by 16th-century Venetian shipbuilders appears to have corresponded to about 0.7 or 0.8 long tons.) with all its sails set, can pass under it; and in truth, many a time when I have been standing on it and looking down into the river, the great height has made me shudder. But while I recollect it I will say that I consider three things in Persia to be great marvels—this bridge of Asanchif, the palace of Assambei Sultan (Note: Assambei Sultan was the Aq Qoyunlu ruler Uzun Hassan. The palace was the now-destroyed Hasht-Behesht Palace in Tabriz.) and the castle of Cimischasac.

— A Venetian merchant, Delle Navigationi et Viaggi

== Ottoman period ==
After Sultan Selim I's victory at the Battle of Chaldiran, the Ottoman Empire gained control of Hasankeyf in 1515. There are few direct accounts of Hasankeyf or the bridge for the next century, but official records do indicate that the town remained a key crossing point on the Tigris. A 1997 study of Ottoman tax records showed that about 858,500 sheep crossed over the bridge during one tax cycle. These were likely herded by nomads moving between pastures in the mountains and pastures in the steppe.

By the second half of the 17th century, travel to the region had evidently increased, and three accounts suggest that the bridge remained functional, although perhaps with some damage.

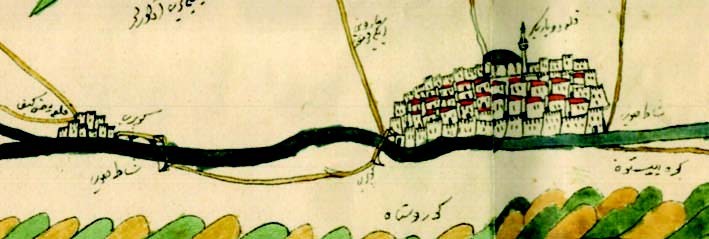
This detail from a 17th-century map (south at top) shows Hasankeyf in miniature at the left and Diyarbakır at the right. The bridge over the Tigris is clearly depicted just outside Hasankeyf as the road from Diyarbakır enters the city. From a 17th-century Ottoman map of the Tigris and Euphrates that may have been created by Evliya Çelebi.

In the Cihānnümā, begun in 1648, Ottoman geographer Kâtip Çelebi briefly describes Ḥıṣn Kayfā and notes the existence of "a bridge between the city and the mountain with the fortress on it."

The unrelated Ottoman traveller Evliya Çelebi visited Hasankeyf in 1656 during his third major travel through Kurdistan. Çelebi's trip north from Baghdad, which took him through Cizre, Hasankeyf and Nusaybin, is recorded in fragmentary notes in Volume 4 of his Seyâhatnâme (written in 1673) that have not yet been published in full. Excerpts from the manuscript indicate that Çelebi was clearly impressed by the "great bridge" at Hasankeyf, which he laments his inability to adequately capture. He does note that the Hasankeyf and Batman bridges contained chambers to accommodate travellers on both sides. Çelebi also mentions the bridge at Hasankeyf later in Volume 5 as one of several notable bridges that was less impressive than the 15th-century Uzunköprü Bridge near Edirne. Neither reference describes the bridge as ruined and the implication is therefore that the Hasankeyf bridge was functional in 1656.

The young Venetian nobleman Ambrosio Bembo traveled down the Tigris and reached Hasankeyf on 6 February 1673. He provides a clear description of the state of the bridge. "Over the river there is a broken stone bridge of four arches, one of which has fallen and has been remade in wood. In the middle of the bridge there is a covered place that serves as a guardhouse. The entire bridge used to be covered in ancient times. All around, it has several figures in relief, but I was not able to get any information from these ignorant people." Given that the central arch was likely always wooden, resting on stone piers, Bembo may have mistaken this for repairs to a fallen arch or the bridge may have been genuinely damaged by this point.

The importance of Hasankeyf shrank beginning in the 17th century and subsequent historical records of southeast Anatolia do not mention the bridge. Therefore, it has been assumed that the bridge became unusable due to damage during the late 17th century.

=== 19th-century travelers ===
By the 19th century, European travelers were passing through the region more frequently, en route to Mesopotamia. While many of them traveled by road between Diyarbakır and Mosul through the Tur Abdin, a few ventured along the Tigris, often on rafts called kalaks, and passed by Hasankeyf. These visitors invariably noted the already-collapsed bridge for its impressive ruined piers, and regularly speculated on who had built it.

Among the earliest of these travelers were three Prussian military officers based in Anatolia who were working on modernizing the Ottoman army in response to the campaigns of Muhammad Ali of Egypt: Captain Karl von Vincke, Major-General Friedrich Leopold Fischer and Captain Helmuth Graf von Moltke, later to serve as chief of general staff for the Prussian and German armies. On 15 April 1838 they set out from Diyarbakır on kalaks, bound for Cizre. Moltke's description of Hasankeyf includes this assessment: "But the most remarkable object is the remnants of a bridge which, in a vast arch spanning 80 to 100 feet, has crossed the Tigris. I do not know whether one can attribute such a bold construction to the old Armenian kings, the Greek emperors, or rather the caliph." (Note: In the German original: "Aber der merkwürdigste Gegenstand sind die Reste einer Brücke, welche in einem gewaltigen Bogen von 80 bis 100 Fuß Spannung hier den Tigris überschritten hat. Ich weiß nicht, ob man einen so kühnen Bau den alten armenischen Königen, den griechischen Kaisern oder wohl eher den Kalifen zuschreiben darf.") (Note: The Fuß (foot) unit as used in Prussia around 1840 was slightly longer than an Imperial foot at approximately 0.314 metres, so Moltke's estimate equates to a span of roughly 25–31 metres (82–102 ft).) Moltke's brief comment is somewhat ambiguous about the exact state of the bridge at the time of his visit.

The British consul in Diyarbakır, John Taylor, visited Hasankeyf in October 1861. He forded the river and described this "noble bridge of three large and three smaller pointed arches" as "now in ruins". However, his comment that the piers "appear much older than the superstructure" suggests that there may have been some attempt to repair the bridge after its initial collapse. Taylor mentions the relief figures on the two central piers, which he interpreted as Parthian, and also notes the overall similarity with the Malabadi Bridge.

By 1873 a report noted that the "only remaining arch" had fallen in 1869. As the smallest arch still remains standing, this probably referred to the collapse of one of the two arches flanking the main span. The artist Tristram James Ellis traveled down the Tigris on a raft from Diyarbakır in March 1880 and at "Hassan-Keyf" noted "some high towers standing in the river, with a minaret on one side, and huge precipices rising from the water just in front." He correctly identified these towers as "piers of a Saracenic pointed arch bridge, now ruined, which at one time carried the great Persian caravan road over the river". During a raft voyage down the Tigris in April 1909, Ely Bannister Soane encountered "the great piers of a once colossal bridge ... that tower above and shadow the passer-by in his humble kalak". Soane reported theories that the bridge was Roman or Venetian.

== Modern period and archaeological study ==
External images
- The central piers of the bridge in 1911, photographed by Gertrude Bell as she crossed the Tigris
- A panorama of Hasankeyf and the bridge in 1911, photographed by Gertrude Bell

Present-day road traffic crosses the Tigris slightly to the east on a modern three-arch concrete bridge built in 1967. The old bridge has been a focus of architectural and historic interest by scholars for many years.

Gertrude Bell photographed the bridge during a visit to Hasankeyf in April and May 1911. At this time, the only river crossing was via raft. The Gertrude Bell Archive at Newcastle University contains many of her photographs of the bridge from this visit.

The first detailed survey was performed by the French architectural historian Albert Gabriel, who visited Hasankeyf twice in 1932 along with the epigraphist Jean Sauvaget. Their survey of the town was published as a chapter of Gabriel's Voyages archéologiques dans la Turquie orientale. This included detailed plan and elevation drawings of the bridge.

=== Ilısu Dam impact ===
Although the first plans for a dam across the Tigris below Hasankeyf were made in 1954 it was not until 1997 that the State Hydraulic Works added the Ilısu Dam to its formal programme.

The remains of the bridge are expected to be submerged by the filling of the reservoir behind the Ilısu Dam. This was expected to begin during 2018 and take at least a year. The lake is expected to have a surface elevation of 525 m (1,722 ft), 65 m (213 ft) above the current river level at Hasankeyf. The dam's reservoir began filling in 2019. The pillars of the bridge were still partly visible in February 2020, but by August 2020 the bridge had fully disappeared under the waters along with the old town.

=== Rescue archeology ===
Following the announcement of the plans for the Ilısu Dam, the bridge was among various historic sites in Hasankeyf to receive closer scrutiny. Based on notes from short visits in June 1975 and May 1989, noted Islamic scholar Michael Meinecke gave it considerable attention in the chapter on Hasankeyf in his 1996 book Patterns of Stylistic Changes in Islamic Architecture. Since 1986, Professor M. Oluş Arık of Ankara University has been the prime investigator documenting the archeological heritage of Hasankeyf. Arık helped organize the site survey in late 2002 by the Center for Research and Assessment of the Historical Environment (TAÇDAM) at Middle East Technical University that resulted in a detailed plan of both the town and the bridge.

Between 2006 and 2013, the Hasankeyf Directorate of Archaeological Excavations conducted three digs near the bridge's northern footing, at the İmam Abdullah Zawiyah, Caravanserai and Bridge Pier sites. The Bridge Pier excavation (actually the farthest from the bridge) examined a 25 m × 25 m (82 ft × 82 ft) area west of the approach road. This uncovered a complex of 15 windowless rooms with walls of rubble stones cemented largely with mud, and floors of stone and rammed earth. The archeologists speculated that the rooms were lit by openings in the roofs, which were likely of vaulted construction. Three rooms may have been kitchens as they had evidence of ovens. The study conjectured that the complex was inhabited by a single extended family. The site was not dated, and the archeologists speculated that it could have been occupied any time between the neolithic and the 19th century.

The Caravanserai excavation lies immediately west of the bridge's northern approach. This examined an area 35 m (115 ft) east-west by 20 m (66 ft) north-south.

The 2006 İmam Abdullah Zawiyah excavation examined a zawiya or religious complex on a site to the northeast of the road approaching the bridge's northern footing. The complex is built around a courtyard that has since become a graveyard. The most prominent buildings are a domed mausoleum on the north side of the courtyard with a minaret or tower adjacent to the east. Visitors entered the courtyard through the east wall and along the inside of this wall was built the zawiya. Along the courtyard's south side is the masjid, or prayer hall. The mausoleum houses the tomb of Imam Abdullah, said to be a descendant of Muhammad. The 2006 excavation confirmed earlier assumptions that the zawiya was originally built by the Artuqids in the 12th century. The tomb was rebuilt during the Ayyubid period by Sultan Muwahhid Taqiyya ad-Din Abdullah (1249–1294). An epigraph above the tomb's entrance records later repairs by one of the sons of the Aq Qoyunlu Turkmen leader Uzun Hassan in 878 AH (1473/1474 CE). Sinclair visited the site in 1979 and, noting a tile on the south wall of the prayer hall with the blessing of the Twelve Imams, speculated that the building had at some point been used by a Shia group, such as the Qara Qoyunlu or the Qizilbash. Sinclair sees parallels with 12th-century Syrian woodwork in the tomb's original, intricately carved doors, which are now in Diyarbakır Museum.

=== Proposed relocation ===
As construction of the dam progressed, there was increased focus by the Turkish government on the idea of relocating or preserving some of the historic structures in Hasankeyf that would be flooded by the reservoir. Early plans called for the bridge piers to be included among a core group of monuments that would be moved to new sites. While relocation was ultimately chosen for some monuments, such as the Tomb of Zeynel Bey, this approach to preserving the ruined bridge appears to have been abandoned. In April 2017, it was reported that work was underway to shore up the piers of the bridge with new masonry and supposedly impermeable mortar. Turkish authorities are reportedly planning to include "historical scuba diving" around the submerged piers among the activities to be offered to tourists after the reservoir is filled.

== Sources ==
- Lord Stanley of Alderley, ed. (1873), Travels to Tana and Persia
- Algaze, Guillermo (1989), "A New Frontier: First Results of the Tigris–Euphrates Archaeological Reconnaissance Project, 1988", Journal of Near Eastern Studies, 48 (4): 241–281, doi:10.1086/373408, JSTOR 544449, S2CID 162368650
- Algaze, Guillermo (1991), "The Tigris–Euphrates Archaeological Reconnaissance Project: A Preliminary Report of the 1989–1990 Seasons", Anatolica (17), Leiden: NINO: 176–240, ISSN 0066-1554
- Amedroz, H. F. (1902), "Three Arabic MSS. on the History of the City of Mayyāfāriqin", Journal of the Royal Asiatic Society of Great Britain and Ireland: 794
- "Ancient City of Hasankeyf and its Surroundings, Turkey". Europa Nostra. 10 December 2015. Archived from the original on 18 December 2015.
- Bembo, Ambrosio (2007), Anthony Welch (ed.), The Travels and Journal of Ambrosio Bembo, Translated by Clara Bargellini, University of California Press, ISBN 9780520940130
- Berchem, Josef; Strzygowski, Max (1910), Amida: Materiaux pour l'épigraphie et l'histoire Musulmanes du Diyar-Bekr [Amida: Material for the Epigraphy and History of the Muslims of Diyarbakır] (in French)
- van Bruinessen, Martin (2000), "Kurdistan in the 16th and 17th centuries, as reflected in Evliya Çelebi's Seyahatname" (PDF), The Journal of Kurdish Studies, 3: 1–11, doi:10.2143/JKS.3.0.519238
- "Call Dutch Company Bresser to Stop the Relocation of Zeynel Bey Tomb!". Initiative to Keep Hasankeyf Alive. 23 April 2017.
- Comfort, Anthony Martin (14 May 2009). Roads on the frontier between Rome and Persia: Euphratesia, Osrhoene and Mesopotamia from AD 363 to 602 (Ph.D.). University of Exeter. hdl:10036/68213.
- Cahen, Claude (1935). "Le Diyâr Bakr au temps des premiers Urtukides". Journal Asiatique. 227: 219–276.
- Cahen, Claude (1955). "Contribution à l'histoire du Diyâr Bakr au quatorzième siècle". Journal Asiatique. 243: 65–100.
- Çelebi, Kātib (2021), Hagen, Gottfried; Dankoff, Robert (eds.), An Ottoman Cosmography: Translation of Cihānnümā, Handbook of Oriental Studies. Section 1 The Near and Middle East, vol. 142, Brill
- Ellis, Tristram James (1881), On a Raft, and Through the Desert, vol. 1, Field and Tuer
- Ertaş, Mehmer Yaşar (2011), "Evliya Çelebi Seyahatnamesi'nde Yollar: Kaldırımlar, Köprüler ve Kervansaraylar" [The Roads in the Seyahatname of Evliya: Highways, Bridges and Caravanserais], Pamukkale Üniversitesi Sosyal Bilimler Enstitüsü Dergisi [Pamukkale University Social Studies Institute Journal] (in Turkish) (10): 43–53
- Gabriel, Albert (1940), "Ḥiṣn Kayfa", Voyages archéologiques dans la Turquie orientale [Archeological Travels in Eastern Turkey] (in French)
- "Gertrude Bell Archive – Album S (1911)". Newcastle University. 2014.
- Göyünç, Nejat; Hütteroth, Wolf-Dieter (1997), Land an der Grenze: Osmanische Verwaltung im heutigen türkisch–syrisch–irakischen, Grenzgebiet im 16. Jahrhundert [Land on the Border: Ottoman Administration in Today's Turkish–Syrian–Iraqi Border Area in the 16th Century] (in German), Istanbul: Eren, p. 132
- Hammer, Emily Louise (2012). Local Landscapes of Pastoral Nomads in Southeastern Turkey (pdf) (PhD). Harvard University.
- Harte, Julia (22 August 2013). "Rare Footage of Ilısu: The Dam That Will Flood Homes and History Across Southern Turkey". National Geographic. Archived from the original on April 11, 2015.
- "HKFK-06-HAN: Caravanserai". Hasankeyf Archaeological Excavations. Hasankeyf Directorate of Archaeological Excavations. 2014. Archived from the original on 18 February 2019.
- "HKFK-06-İA: İmam Abdullah Zawiyah". Hasankeyf Archaeological Excavations. Hasankeyf Directorate of Archaeological Excavations. 2014. Archived from the original on 18 February 2019.
- "HKFK-06-KA: Bridge Pier". Hasankeyf Archaeological Excavations. Hasankeyf Directorate of Archaeological Excavations. 2014. Archived from the original on 18 February 2019.
- Hillenbrand, Carole (1979). The history of the Jazira 1100–1150: the contribution of Ibn Al-Azraq al-Fariqi (Thesis). University of Edinburgh. hdl:1842/7341.
- Howorth, Henry Hoyle (1888), "III. Khulagu Khan (continued)", History of the Mongols: The Mongols proper and the Kalmuks, vol. 2, London: Longmans, Green and Co., p. 161
- Ilısu Dam and HEPP: Environmental Impact Assessment Report (PDF), Ankara: Ilısu Consortium, 31 July 2005, archived from the original (PDF) on 26 September 2015
- İlter, Fügen (1994), "The Main Features of the Seljuk, the Beylik and the Ottoman Bridges of the Turkish Anatolian Architecture from the XIIth to the XVIth Centuries", Belleten, 57 (219): 481–494, doi:10.37879/belleten.1993.481, S2CID 193527544
- Karateke, Hakan (2013), Evliyā Çelebī's Journey from Bursa to the Dardanelles and Edirne: From the Fifth Book of the Seyāḥatnāme, Brill, ISBN 9789004252950
- Lane, Frederic Chapin (1992), Venetian Ships and Shipbuilders of the Renaissance, JHU Press, ISBN 9780801845147
- Le Strange, Guy (1930), The Lands of the Eastern Caliphate: Mesopotamia, Persia, and Central Asia, Cambridge University Press
- Martine. "South-Eastern Anatolia: Hasankeyf". Archived from the original on May 4, 2003.
- Meinecke, Michael (1996), "3. Hasankeyf/Ḥiṣn Kaifā on the Tigris: A Regional Center on the Crossroad of Foreign Influences", Patterns of Stylistic Changes in Islamic Architecture: Local Traditions Versus Migrating Artists, New York University Press, ISBN 9780814754924
- Mellink, Machteld J. (January 1991), "Archaeology in Anatolia", American Journal of Archaeology, 95 (1): 123–153, doi:10.2307/505160, JSTOR 505160, S2CID 245275550
- Moltke (Graf von), Helmuth (1841), Briefe über Zustände und Begebenheiten in der Türkei aus den Jahren 1835 bis 1839 [Letters about Conditions and Events in Turkey between the Years 1835 and 1839] (in German), E.S. Mittler, pp. 236–238
- Al-Muqaddasi (1994), The Best Divisions for Knowledge of the Regions [Aḥsan al-Taqāsīm fī Maʿrifat al-Aqālīm], translated by Collins, Basil Anthony, Center for Muslim Contribution to Civilization and Garnet Publishing Limited, ISBN 978-1873938140
- Palmer, Andrew (1990), Monk and Mason on the Tigris Frontier: The Early History of Ṭur ʿAbdin, Cambridge University Press, ISBN 9780521360265
- Ramusio, Giovanni Battista (1559), "Viaggio d'un mercante che fu nella Persia, chapter 4" [Journey of a Merchant in Persia], Delle Navigationi et Viaggi [Voyages and Travels] (in Italian) (translated in Alderley, 1873)
- Sinclair, T.A. (1989), Eastern Turkey: An Architectural and Archaeological Survey, vol. 3, Pindar Press, ISBN 978-0907132349
- Soane, Ely Banister (1912), To Mesopotamia and Kurdistan in Disguise (PDF), London: John Murray, archived from the original (PDF) on 4 March 2016 Alt URL
- Starr, Stephen (3 April 2017), "Endgame for Turkey's Ancient Hasankeyf in Sight", Irish Times
- "Stones on submerging Hasankeyf bridge moved to museum". 14 February 2018.
- Taylor, John G. (1865), "Travels in Kurdistan, with Notices of the Sources of the Eastern and Western Tigris, and Ancient Ruins in their Neighbourhood", Journal of the Royal Geographical Society, 35, London: 21–58, doi:10.2307/3698077, JSTOR 3698077
- Whelan, Estelle (1988), "Representations of the Khassakiyah and the Origins of Mamluk Emblems", in Soucek, Priscilla (ed.), Content and Context of Visual Arts in the Islamic World, University Park, Pennsylvania: Pennsylvania State University Press
- Zekeriya, Kurşun (2012), "Does the Qatar Map of the Tigris and Euphrates belong to Evliya Çelebi?" (PDF), Journal of Ottoman Studies [Osmanlı Araştırmaları] (39): 1–15, archived from the original (PDF) on 2016-08-23
