= Ormankaya, Hazro =

Village in Turkey

Ormankaya
- Neighbourhood
- Location in Turkey
- Coordinates: 38°18′N 40°46′E
- Country: Turkey
- Province: Diyarbakır
- District: Hazro
- Population (2022): 870
- Time zone: UTC+3 (TRT)

Ormankaya (Kurdish: Şimşim; Syriac: Šemšem) (Note: Alternatively transliterated as Cham-Cham, Chemchan, Chemchem, Sham-Sham, Shem-Shan, Shimshim, Shim-Shim, or Şımşım.) is a neighbourhood in the municipality and district of Hazro, Diyarbakır Province in Turkey. It is populated by Kurds and had a population of 870 in 2022. It is located atop the Mountain of Takh.

== History ==
Šemšem (today called Ormankaya) was historically inhabited by Syriac Orthodox Christians and Armenians. The village belonged to the Syriac Orthodox diocese of Hattack. In the Syriac Orthodox patriarchal register of dues of 1870, it was recorded that the village had 84 households, who paid 128 dues, and it did not have a priest. There were Syriac Orthodox churches of Morī Agrīpūs and Mortī Šmūnī. In 1880, there were 44 Armenian hearths. There was an Armenian church of Surb Hovhannes. In 1914, it was populated by 800 Syriacs, according to the list presented to the Paris Peace Conference by the Assyro-Chaldean delegation. It was located in the kaza of Lice. The village's population was massacred before mid-July 1915 amidst the Sayfo by gangs of çetes.

== Bibliography ==
- Barsoum, Aphrem (2009). History of the Syriac Dioceses. Vol. 1. Translated by Matti Moosa. Gorgias Press.
- Bcheiry, Iskandar (2009). The Syriac Orthodox Patriarchal Register of Dues of 1870: An Unpublished Historical Document from the Late Ottoman Period. Gorgias Press.
- Gaunt, David (2006). Massacres, Resistance, Protectors: Muslim-Christian Relations in Eastern Anatolia during World War I. Gorgias Press.
- Jongerden, Joost; Verheij, Jelle, eds. (2012). Social Relations in Ottoman Diyarbekir, 1870-1915. Brill.
- Kévorkian, Raymond H. (2006). "Demographic Changes in the Armenian Population of Diarbekir, 1895-1914". In Richard G. Hovannisian (ed.). Armenian Tigranakert/Diarbekir and Edessa/Urfa. Mazda Publishers.
- Tîgrîs, Amed; Çakar, Yıldız (2012). Amed : erdnîgarî, dîrok, çand (in Kurdish).
