= Diyarbakir Province (disambiguation) =

Diyarbakir Province may refer to:

- Diyarbakır Province, a province of modern Turkey (1922–present)
- Diyarbekir Vilayet, a vilayet of the Ottoman Empire (1867–1922)
- Diyarbekir Eyalet, an eyalet of the Ottoman Empire (1515–1867)
