= Çitlibahçe, Hazro =

Village in Turkey

Çitlibahçe
- Neighbourhood
- Location in Turkey
- Coordinates: 38°18′N 40°43′E
- Country: Turkey
- Province: Diyarbakır
- District: Hazro
- Population (2022): 368
- Time zone: UTC+3 (TRT)

Çitlibahçe (Kurdish: Helhel; Syriac: Ḥelḥel) (Note: Alternatively transliterated as Ḥalḥal, Hal-Hal, Halhal, or Halhel.) is a neighbourhood in the municipality and district of Hazro, Diyarbakır Province in Turkey. It is populated by Kurds and had a population of 368 in 2022. It is located atop the Mountain of Takh.

== History ==
Ḥelḥel (today called Çitlibahçe) was historically inhabited by Syriac Orthodox Christians and Armenians. One deacon was consecrated for the Syriac Orthodox Church of Morī Māmā at Ḥelḥel on the Sunday after the Feast of the Ascension in AD 1590 (AG 1901). An Order of Ordinations was compiled at the Church of Morī Māmā by Basilius ‘Abd al-Ahad, bishop of Zarjal, in 1705. The village belonged to the Syriac Orthodox diocese of Hattack.

In the Syriac Orthodox patriarchal register of dues of 1870, it was recorded that the village had sixteen households, who paid twenty-eight dues, and did not have a priest. There were eight Armenian hearths in 1880. There was an Armenian church of Surb Gevorg. In 1914, there were 200 Syriacs at Ḥelḥel, according to the list presented to the Paris Peace Conference by the Assyro-Chaldean delegation. It was located in the kaza of Lice.

== Bibliography ==
- Barsoum, Aphrem (2009). History of the Syriac Dioceses. Vol. 1. Translated by Matti Moosa. Gorgias Press.
- Bcheiry, Iskandar (2009). The Syriac Orthodox Patriarchal Register of Dues of 1870: An Unpublished Historical Document from the Late Ottoman Period. Gorgias Press.
- Bcheiry, Iskandar (2010). A List of Syriac Orthodox Ecclesiastic Ordinations from the Sixteenth and Seventeenth Century: The Syriac Manuscript of Hunt 444 (Syr 68 in Bodleian Library, Oxford). Gorgias Press.
- Gaunt, David (2006). Massacres, Resistance, Protectors: Muslim-Christian Relations in Eastern Anatolia during World War I. Gorgias Press.
- Jongerden, Joost; Verheij, Jelle, eds. (2012). Social Relations in Ottoman Diyarbekir, 1870-1915. Brill.
- Kévorkian, Raymond H. (2006). "Demographic Changes in the Armenian Population of Diarbekir, 1895-1914". In Richard G. Hovannisian (ed.). Armenian Tigranakert/Diarbekir and Edessa/Urfa. Mazda Publishers.
