= İncekavak, Hazro =

Village in Turkey

İncekavak
- Neighbourhood
- Location in Turkey
- Coordinates: 38°13′N 40°43′E
- Country: Turkey
- Province: Diyarbakır
- District: Hazro
- Population (2022): 841
- Time zone: UTC+3 (TRT)

İncekavak (Kurdish: Gomeyê Hecî Derwêşî) is a neighbourhood in the municipality and district of Hazro, Diyarbakır Province in Turkey. It is populated by Kurds and had a population of 841 in 2022.
