= Meşebağları, Hazro =

Village in Turkey

Meşebağları
- Neighbourhood
- Location in Turkey
- Coordinates: 38°17′N 40°38′E
- Country: Turkey
- Province: Diyarbakır
- District: Hazro
- Population (2022): 678
- Time zone: UTC+3 (TRT)

Meşebağları (Kurdish: Şikeftê Cemaldînî) is a neighbourhood in the municipality and district of Hazro, Diyarbakır Province in Turkey. It is populated by Kurds and had a population of 678 in 2022.
