= Kulaçtepe, Hazro =

Village in Turkey

Kulaçtepe
- Neighbourhood
- Location in Turkey
- Coordinates: 38°12′17″N 40°41′49″E
- Country: Turkey
- Province: Diyarbakır
- District: Hazro
- Population (2022): 131
- Time zone: UTC+3 (TRT)

Kulaçtepe (Kurdish: Gomeyê şikeftan) is a neighbourhood in the municipality and district of Hazro, Diyarbakır Province in Turkey. It is populated by Kurds and had a population of 131 in 2022.
