= Mutluca, Hazro =

Village in Turkey

Mutluca
- Neighbourhood
- Location in Turkey
- Coordinates: 38°16′37″N 40°53′58″E
- Country: Turkey
- Province: Diyarbakır
- District: Hazro
- Population (2022): 63
- Time zone: UTC+3 (TRT)

Mutluca (Kurdish: Berbûşê) is a neighbourhood in the municipality and district of Hazro, Diyarbakır Province in Turkey. It is populated by Kurds and had a population of 63 in 2022.
