= Sarıerik, Hazro =

Village in Turkey

Sarıerik
- Neighbourhood
- Location in Turkey
- Coordinates: 38°17′39″N 40°39′04″E
- Country: Turkey
- Province: Diyarbakır
- District: Hazro
- Population (2022): 455
- Time zone: UTC+3 (TRT)

Sarıerik (Kurdish: Qenderhel) is a neighbourhood in the municipality and district of Hazro, Diyarbakır Province in Turkey. It is populated by Kurds and had a population of 455 in 2022.
