= Koçbaba, Hazro =

Village in Turkey

Koçbaba
- Neighbourhood
- Location in Turkey
- Coordinates: 38°15′26″N 40°37′20″E
- Country: Turkey
- Province: Diyarbakır
- District: Hazro
- Population (2022): 93
- Time zone: UTC+3 (TRT)

Koçbaba (Kurdish: Hondof) is a neighbourhood in the municipality and district of Hazro, Diyarbakır Province in Turkey. It is populated by Kurds and had a population of 93 in 2022.
