= Ülgen, Hazro =

Village in Turkey

Ülgen
- Neighbourhood
- Location in Turkey
- Coordinates: 38°15′N 40°54′E
- Country: Turkey
- Province: Diyarbakır
- District: Hazro
- Population (2022): 250
- Time zone: UTC+3 (TRT)

Ülgen (Kurdish: Mîhrenî) is a neighbourhood in the municipality and district of Hazro, Diyarbakır Province in Turkey. It is populated by Kurds and had a population of 250 in 2022.
