= Mohammad Khan Ustajlu =

Safavid military commander (died 1514)

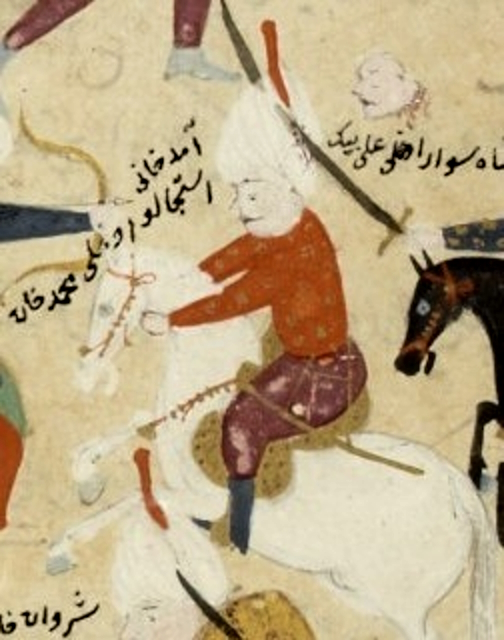
- Mohammad Khan at the Battle of Chaldiran in an Ottoman miniature from Hoja Sa'd al-Din's Taj al-Tewarih.

Governor of Diyarbakr Province
- In office 1506–1514
- Monarch: Ismail I
- Preceded by: Amir Khan Mawsillu
- Succeeded by: Qara Beg Ustajlu

Personal details
- Occupation: Military commander, official

Military service
- Allegiance: Safavid Iran
- Battles/wars: Ottoman–Persian War (1505–1517); Battle of Chaldiran †

Mohammad Khan Ustajlu (Persian: محمد خان استاجلو; died 1514) was an Iranian military commander and official from the Turkoman Ustajlu tribe, who served during the reign of Safavid Shah Ismail I (r. 1501–1524). He played a pivotal role in Ismail I's conquests and expansion in Asia Minor and Mesopotamia, and functioned as governor of the Diyarbakr Province from 1506 to 1514. Mohammad Khan was killed while serving as a commander at the Battle of Chaldiran.

== Biography ==
Mohammad Khan Ustajlu was a son of Mirza Beg Ustajlu, and had three brothers; Owlash Beg Ustajlu, Evaz Beg Ustajlu and Qara Beg Ustajlu. He was married to one of king Ismail I's sisters. When Ismail I returned to Khoy in 1506, after some skirmishes with Ala al-Dawla Bozkurt, the ruler of the Dulkadir, he appointed Mohammad Khan Ustajlu as the new governor (hakem) of Diyarbakr.

About two months before the decisive Battle of Chaldiran (1514), Ottoman Sultan Selim I (r. 1511–1520) and his army had reached the town of Sivas. Aware of the massive approach, Mohammad Khan Ustajlu, during his retreat from his governoral seat in Diyarbakr, devastated the area, which slowed the Ottoman progress towards the east in the ensuing weeks to come.

On 23 August 1514, the day the decisive battle took place, Mohammad Khan Ustajlu and Nur-Ali Khalifa were the two Safavid commanders who had first-hand experience with the Ottomans ways of warfare. They both advised to attack at once, in order to prevent the Ottoman's from establishing their proper defensive positions. Mohammad Khan also counseled against a frontal attack due to the strength of the Ottoman artillery. This advice however, was rejected by both Durmish Khan Shamlu as well as by the shah himself. Durmish Khan, a high-ranking member of the Qizilbash and a prominent figure at court because of his connections, rudely rebuffed Mohammad Khan and Nur-Ali Khalifa. Durmish Khan considered it "cowardly to engage an unprepared enemy". Ismail I chose to endorse Durmish Khan Shamlu's suggestion for the attack and thus the Ottomans were allowed to prepare their defenses at their leisure. This would prove costly, contributing to the sound Safavid defeat at Chaldiran. Mohammad Khan, who was in command of the left wing of the Safavid army, was killed, and his men fell in disarray.

== Sources ==
- Floor, Willem M. (2008). Titles and Emoluments in Safavid Iran: A Third Manual of Safavid Administration, by Mirza Naqi Nasiri. Washington, DC: Mage Publishers. p. 180. ISBN 978-1933823232.
- Floor, Willem; Herzig, Edmund, eds. (2012). Iran and the World in the Safavid Age. I.B. Tauris. p. 55. ISBN 978-1780769905.
- McCaffrey, Michael J. (1990). "ČĀLDERĀN". In Yarshater, Ehsan (ed.). Encyclopædia Iranica. Vol. IV/6: Burial II–Calendars II. London and New York: Routledge & Kegan Paul. pp. 656–658. ISBN 978-0-71009-129-1.
- Savory, Roger (2007). Iran Under the Safavids. Cambridge: Cambridge University Press. ISBN 978-0521042512.

Preceded by Amir Khan Mawsillu	Governor of Diyarbakr; 1506–1514	Succeeded by Qara Beg Ustajlu
