= Hükümet =

Hükümet may refer to:

- A type of Ocaklık, hereditary estate in the Ottoman Empire
- Ahkam, Islamic ruling
