= Sarıçanak, Hazro =

Village in Turkey

Sarıçanak
- Neighbourhood
- Location in Turkey
- Coordinates: 38°11′N 40°45′E
- Country: Turkey
- Province: Diyarbakır
- District: Hazro
- Population (2022): 293
- Time zone: UTC+3 (TRT)

Sarıçanak (Kurdish: Xincîkan) is a neighbourhood in the municipality and district of Hazro, Diyarbakır Province in Turkey. It is populated by Kurds and had a population of 293 in 2022.
