= Reşik, Hazro =

Village in Turkey

Reşik
- Neighbourhood
- Location within Turkey
- Coordinates: 38°12′13″N 40°37′23″E
- Country: Turkey
- Province: Diyarbakır
- District: Hazro
- Population (2022): 289
- Time zone: UTC+3 (TRT)

Reşik, (formerly Gürlek), is a neighbourhood in the municipality and district of Hazro, Diyarbakır Province in Turkey. It is populated by Kurds and had a population of 289 in 2022.
