= Gözlü, Hazro =

Village in Turkey

Gözlü
- Neighbourhood
- Location in Turkey
- Coordinates: 38°12′24″N 40°39′31″E
- Country: Turkey
- Province: Diyarbakır
- District: Hazro
- Population (2022): 885
- Time zone: UTC+3 (TRT)

Gözlü (Kurdish: Gomeyê Eyndarî) is a neighbourhood in the municipality and district of Hazro, Diyarbakır Province in Turkey. It is populated by Kurds and had a population of 885 in 2022.
