= Ağartı, Hazro =

Village in Turkey

Ağartı
- Neighbourhood
- Location in Turkey
- Coordinates: 38.1561°N 40.8179°E
- Country: Turkey
- Province: Diyarbakır
- District: Hazro
- Population (2022): 66
- Time zone: UTC+3 (TRT)

Ağartı (Kurdish: Cirnoqî) is a neighbourhood in the municipality and district of Hazro, Diyarbakır Province in Turkey. It is populated by Kurds and had a population of 66 in 2022.
