= Bayırdüzü, Hazro =

Village in Turkey

Bayırdüzü
- Neighbourhood
- Location in Turkey
- Coordinates: 38.1993°N 40.8434°E
- Country: Turkey
- Province: Diyarbakır
- District: Hazro
- Population (2022): 175
- Time zone: UTC+3 (TRT)

Bayırdüzü (Kurdish: Bazmare) is a neighbourhood in the municipality and district of Hazro, Diyarbakır Province in Turkey. It is populated by Kurds and had a population of 175 in 2022.
