= Gedikalan, Hazro =

Village in Turkey

Gedikalan
- Neighbourhood
- Location in Turkey
- Coordinates: 38°14′08″N 40°45′28″E
- Country: Turkey
- Province: Diyarbakır
- District: Hazro
- Population (2022): 215
- Time zone: UTC+3 (TRT)

Gedikalan (Kurdish: Kekan) is a neighbourhood in the municipality and district of Hazro, Diyarbakır Province in Turkey. It is populated by Kurds and had a population of 215 in 2022.
