= Uzunargıt, Hazro =

Village in Turkey

Uzunargıt
- Neighbourhood
- Location in Turkey
- Coordinates: 38°13′49″N 40°46′40″E
- Country: Turkey
- Province: Diyarbakır
- District: Hazro
- Population (2022): 138
- Time zone: UTC+3 (TRT)

Uzunargıt (Kurdish: Zoxur) is a neighbourhood in the municipality and district of Hazro, Diyarbakır Province in Turkey. It is populated by Kurds and had a population of 138 in 2022.
