= Bağyurdu, Hazro =

Village in Turkey

Bağyurdu
- Neighbourhood
- Location in Turkey
- Coordinates: 38.2296°N 40.8138°E
- Country: Turkey
- Province: Diyarbakır
- District: Hazro
- Population (2022): 257
- Time zone: UTC+3 (TRT)

Bağyurdu (Kurdish: Kobik) is a neighbourhood in the municipality and district of Hazro, Diyarbakır Province in Turkey. It is populated by Kurds and had a population of 257 in 2022.
