= Evaz Beg Ustajlu =

Turkoman military officer from the Ustajlu tribe

Evaz Beg Ustajlu was a Turkoman military officer from the Ustajlu tribe, who briefly served as the Safavid governor of Bitlis (Bedlis, also spelled Betlis) in 1514. He was a son of Mirza Beg Ustajlu and had three brothers; Mohammad Khan Ustajlu, Owlash Beg Ustajlu and Qara Beg Ustajlu.

== Sources ==
- Floor, Willem M. (2008). Titles and Emoluments in Safavid Iran: A Third Manual of Safavid Administration, by Mirza Naqi Nasiri. Washington, DC: Mage Publishers. pp. 167–168, 180, 209. ISBN 978-1933823232.

Preceded by Kord Beg Charqlu? Ustajlu	Governor of Bitlis; 1514	Succeeded by Sharaf Khan (Rudaki Kurdi)
