= Dadaş, Hazro =

Village in Turkey

Dadaş
- Neighbourhood
- Location in Turkey
- Coordinates: 38°16′48″N 40°43′12″E
- Country: Turkey
- Province: Diyarbakır
- District: Hazro
- Population (2022): 1,110
- Time zone: UTC+3 (TRT)

Dadaş (Kurdish: Dedaş) is a neighbourhood in the municipality and district of Hazro, Diyarbakır Province in Turkey. It is populated by Kurds and had a population of 1,110 in 2022.
