= Diyarbakır oil field =

Oil field in Diyakbakır, Turkey

Diyarbakır
- Country: Turkey
- Region: Southeastern Anatolia Region
- Location: Diyarbakır
- Offshore/onshore: onshore
- Operator: Türkiye Petrolleri Anonim Ortaklığı

Production
- Current production of oil: 250 barrels per day (~12,000 t/a)
- Estimated oil in place: 2.2 million tonnes (~ 2.5×10^{6} m^{3} or 16 million bbl)

The Diyarbakır oil field is an oil field located in Diyarbakır, Diyarbakır Province, Southeastern Anatolia Region. It was discovered in 2009 and developed by Türkiye Petrolleri Anonim Ortaklığı, and began production in the same year. The total proven reserves of the Diyarbakır oil field are around 16 million barrels (2.2 million tonnes), and production is centered on 250 barrels per day (40 m^{3}/d).
