= Safavid Diyarbakr =

Safavid province from 1504 to 1514/7

Velāyat-e Diyarbakr
- 1504–1514/1517
- Status: Province of the Safavid Empire
- Capital: Amida (Diyarbakır)
- Common languages: Persian, Turkish, Kurdish, Arabic, Syriac, Armenian
- Government: Province
- hakem
Succeeded by
Diyarbekir Eyalet
- Today part of: Turkey

The province of Diyarbakr (Persian: ولایت دیاربکر, romanized: Velāyat-e Diārbakr) was a short-lived province of the Safavid Empire located in the area of present-day Turkey. Amida (Medieval Diyarbakır) was the provincial capital, and the seat of the Safavid governors. It had the following administrative jurisdictions; Orfah (Urfa), Jazireh (Cizre), Kharput (Elazığ), Mardin, Sert (Siirt), and Hesn Keyfeh (Hasankeyf).

== Sources ==
- Faroqhi, Suraiya (2009). Frisch, Shelley (ed.). The Ottoman Empire: A Short History. Markus Wiener Publishers. p. 91. ISBN 978-1558764491.
- Floor, Willem M. (2008). Titles and Emoluments in Safavid Iran: A Third Manual of Safavid Administration, by Mirza Naqi Nasiri. Washington, DC: Mage Publishers. pp. 180, 209, 252. ISBN 978-1933823232.
- Kia, Mehrdad (2017). The Ottoman Empire: A Historical Encyclopedia (Vol. 1). ABC-CLIO. p. 101. ISBN 978-1610693899.
