= Hazro, Diyarbakır =

Hazro
- District and municipality
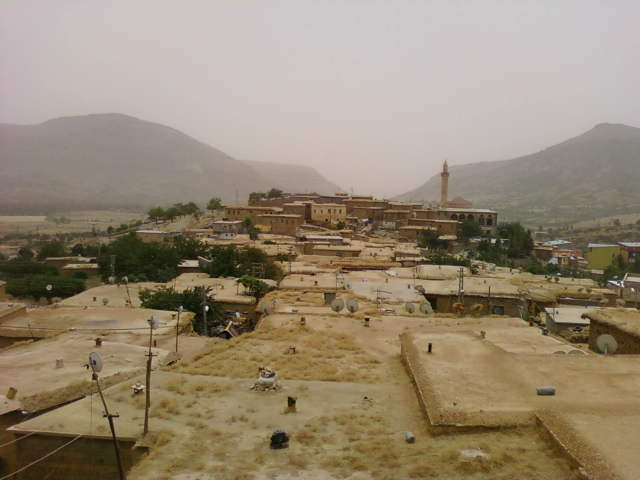

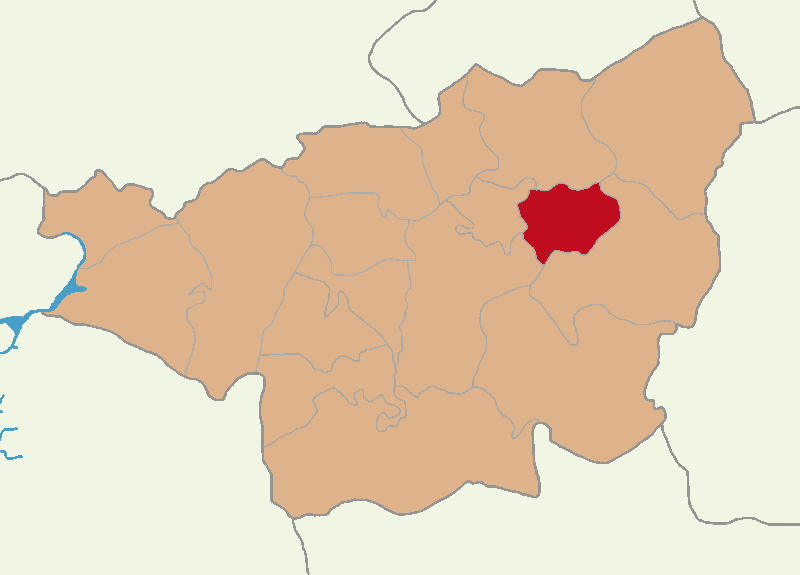
- Map showing Hazro District in Diyarbakır Province

- Location within Turkey
- Coordinates: 38°15′22″N 40°46′59″E
- Country: Turkey
- Province: Diyarbakır
- Area: 426 km^{2} (164 sq mi)
- Population (2022): 16,093
  - Density: 37.8/km^{2} (97.8/sq mi)
- Time zone: UTC+3 (TRT)
- Postal code: 21560
- Area code: 0412
- Website: www.hazro.bel.tr

Hazro (Kurdish: Hezro; Syriac: Qaṣabah Ḥazrū) (Note: Also known as Harzo.) is a municipality and district of Diyarbakır Province, Turkey. Its area is 426 km^{2}, and the population was 16,093 in 2022. It is populated by Kurds.

== History ==
Qaṣabah Ḥazrū (today called Hazro) was historically inhabited by Syriac Orthodox Christians and Kurdish-speaking Armenians. In the Syriac Orthodox patriarchal register of dues of 1870, it was recorded that the village had 10 households, who paid 10 dues, and did not have a church or a priest. There were 176 Armenian hearths in 1880. There were Armenian churches of Surb Astvatsatsin and Surb Shmavon.

200 Armenian Orthodox families from Hazro fled to Diyarbakır in June 1889, abandoning their harvests, homes, and all of their possessions, to escape the violence inflicted by Agha Seweddin Bey. It was located in the kaza (district) of Silvan in the Diyarbekir sanjak in the Diyarbekir vilayet in c. 1900. In 1914, it was populated by 200 Syriacs, according to the list presented to the Paris Peace Conference by the Assyro-Chaldean delegation. The Armenians were attacked by the Belek, Bekran, Şegro, and other Kurdish tribes in May 1915 amidst the Armenian genocide.

In the local elections in March 2019, Ahmet Çevik from the Kurdish Peoples' Democratic Party (HDP) was elected Mayor. He was dismissed in November 2019 and the District Governor Ali Öner was appointed as trustee.

== Composition ==
There are 31 neighbourhoods in Hazro District:

- Ağartı
- Bağyurdu
- Bahçe
- Bayırdüzü
- Cami
- Çitlibahçe
- Çökeksu
- Dadaş
- Elhuvan
- Gedikalan
- Gözlü
- Hürriyet
- İncekavak
- İşkar
- Kavaklıboğaz
- Kırkkaşık
- Kırmataş
- Koçbaba
- Kulaçtepe
- Meşebağları
- Mutluca
- Ormankaya
- Reşik
- Sarıçanak
- Sarıerik
- Terdöken
- Topalan
- Ülgen
- Uzunargıt
- Varınca
- Yazgı

== Bibliography ==
- Bcheiry, Iskandar (2009). The Syriac Orthodox Patriarchal Register of Dues of 1870: An Unpublished Historical Document from the Late Ottoman Period. Gorgias Press.
- Courtois, Sébastien de (2004). The Forgotten Genocide: Eastern Christians, The Last Arameans. Translated by Vincent Aurora. Gorgias Press.
- Gaunt, David (2006). Massacres, Resistance, Protectors: Muslim-Christian Relations in Eastern Anatolia during World War I. Gorgias Press.
- Jongerden, Joost; Verheij, Jelle, eds. (2012). Social Relations in Ottoman Diyarbekir, 1870-1915. Brill.
- Kévorkian, Raymond H. (2006). "Demographic Changes in the Armenian Population of Diarbekir, 1895-1914". In Richard G. Hovannisian (ed.). Armenian Tigranakert/Diarbekir and Edessa/Urfa. Mazda Publishers.
- Kévorkian, Raymond (2011). The Armenian Genocide: A Complete History. I.B. Tauris.
