= Diyarbakır Archaeological Museum =

Museum in Diyarbakır, Turkey

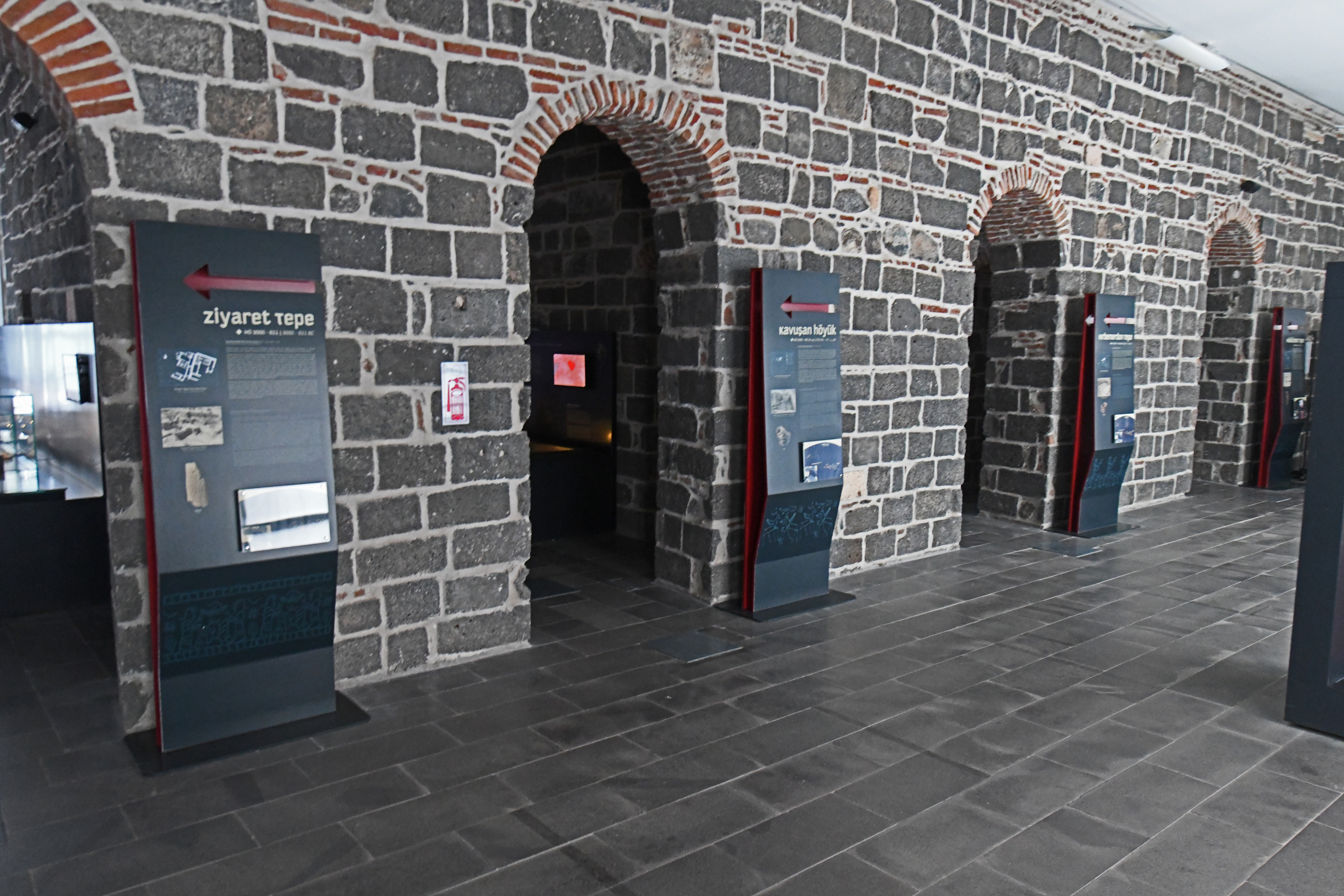

Diyarbakır Archaeological Museum is an archaeological museum in Diyarbakır, Turkey.
