= Çemişgezek =

- Municipality
- Location in Turkey
- Coordinates: 39°03′47″N 38°54′40″E
- Country: Turkey
- Province: Tunceli
- District: Çemişgezek
- Population (2021): 3,009
- Time zone: UTC+3 (TRT)

Çemişgezek (Armenian: Չմշկածագ, romanized: Čmškacag; (Note: Alternatively transliterated as Chemeshgadzak or Tchmechgadzak.) Kurdish: Melkişî) is a municipality (belde) and seat of Çemişgezek District of Tunceli Province, Turkey. The town had a population of 3,009 in 2021 and is populated by both Kurds and Turks.

The town is divided into the neighbourhoods of Çukur, Hacı Cami, Hamamatik, Kale, Mescit, Tepebaşı and Yenimahalle.

== History ==
Chemeshgadzak (today called Çemişgezek) appears to have been the centre of the Armenian principality of Tsopk Shahuni or Pokr Tsopk (Royal Tsopk or Lesser Tsopk) within the Kingdom of Sophene. It was known to the Greeks as Hierapolis (Holy City) and Kosomakhon to the Byzantine Empire.

== Geography ==
=== Climate ===
Çemişgezek has a Mediterranean climate (Köppen: Csa) with very hot, dry summers and chilly, frequently snowy winters.

Climate data for Çemişgezek (1991–2020)
Month	Jan	Feb	Mar	Apr	May	Jun	Jul	Aug	Sep	Oct	Nov	Dec	Year
Mean daily maximum °C (°F)	4.8 (40.6)	6.8 (44.2)	12.6 (54.7)	18.6 (65.5)	24.3 (75.7)	30.9 (87.6)	35.6 (96.1)	35.8 (96.4)	30.5 (86.9)	22.8 (73.0)	13.5 (56.3)	6.7 (44.1)	20.3 (68.5)
Daily mean °C (°F)	0.9 (33.6)	2.3 (36.1)	7.3 (45.1)	12.7 (54.9)	17.5 (63.5)	23.2 (73.8)	27.6 (81.7)	27.8 (82.0)	22.7 (72.9)	16.2 (61.2)	8.3 (46.9)	2.9 (37.2)	14.2 (57.6)
Mean daily minimum °C (°F)	−2.1 (28.2)	−1.3 (29.7)	2.9 (37.2)	7.6 (45.7)	11.6 (52.9)	15.8 (60.4)	19.6 (67.3)	20.1 (68.2)	15.8 (60.4)	10.9 (51.6)	4.4 (39.9)	0.1 (32.2)	8.8 (47.8)
Average precipitation mm (inches)	64.67 (2.55)	62.0 (2.44)	63.78 (2.51)	73.75 (2.90)	59.92 (2.36)	10.73 (0.42)	2.44 (0.10)	1.39 (0.05)	11.58 (0.46)	45.68 (1.80)	56.14 (2.21)	67.49 (2.66)	519.57 (20.46)
Average precipitation days (≥ 1.0 mm)	8.1	8.3	8.7	9.3	8.0	2.8	1.6	1.3	2.5	5.2	6.6	8.2	70.6
Average relative humidity (%)	71.4	67.5	59.7	57.0	55.6	43.8	36.7	34.3	37.5	53.0	64.3	73.0	54.4
Source: NOAA

== Notable people ==
- John I Tzimiskes (925–976), Byzantine emperor of Armenian origin
- Aurora Mardiganian (1901–1994), Armenian-American author, actress, and a survivor of the Armenian genocide
- Aynur Doğan (b. 1975), Kurdish singer

== See also ==
- Emirate of Çemişgezek

== Bibliography ==
- Andrews, Peter Alford; Benninghaus, Rüdiger (2002). Ethnic Groups in the Republic of Turkey: Supplement and Index. Reichert. ISBN 9783895002298.
- Avcıkıran, Adem (2009). Kürtçe Anamnez Anamneza bi Kurmancî (in Turkish and Kurdish).
- Hewsen, Robert H. (2002). "The Five "Peoples" of Tsopk/Sophene". In Richard G. Hovannisian (ed.). Armenian Tsopk/Kharpert. Mazda Publishers. pp. 123–135.
- Kévorkian, Raymond (2011). The Armenian Genocide: A Complete History. I.B. Tauris.
