= Sağman, Pertek =

Village in Tunceli Province, Turkey

Sağman
- Village
- Location within Turkey
- Coordinates: 38.932°N 39.279°E
- Country: Turkey
- Province: Tunceli
- District: Pertek
- Population (2021): 156
- Time zone: UTC+3 (TRT)

Sağman is a village in the Pertek District, Tunceli Province, Turkey. The village is populated by Turks and had a population of 156 in 2021.

The hamlets of Arılar, Çıkınlı, Çukurbağ, Dağarcık, Dillice, Kabalı and Sorkunbağı are attached to the village.

== History ==
It gained some prominence as a Kurdish chiefdom in the 16th century and is surrounded by historic sights. The village has a ruined citadel with a 16th-century mosque, tomb and tekke built by the Kurdish Sanjak-bey Keykusrav.
