= Kabakaya, Lice =

Village in Turkey

Kabakaya
- Neighbourhood
- Location in Turkey
- Coordinates: 38°21′15″N 40°43′58″E
- Country: Turkey
- Province: Diyarbakır
- District: Lice
- Population (2022): 290
- Time zone: UTC+3 (TRT)

Kabakaya (Kurdish: Entax) is a neighbourhood in the municipality and district of Lice, Diyarbakır Province in Turkey. It is populated by Kurds and had a population of 290 in 2022.
