= Bidlisi =

Bidlisi or Bitlisi means "from Bitlis" and may refer to:

- Hosam al-Din Ali Bitlisi (died 1494–1495), Kurdish Sufi author
- Idris Bitlisi (c. 1455–1520), Ottoman Kurdish scholar and administrator
- Bitlisi dynasty, the ruling house of the Principality of Bitlis, a historical Kurdish principality
  - Sharaf Khan Bidlisi (1543–1603), Safavid Kurdish historian and author of Sharafname
