= Hosam =

Hosam is a given name. Notable people with the name include:

- Hosam Abdallah (born 1966), Egyptian handball player
- Hosam Bakr Abdin (born 1985), Egyptian boxer
- Hosam Aiesh (born 1995), professional footballer
- Hosam Badrawy, Egyptian physician and politician
- Hosam al-Din Ali Bitlisi (died 1494), Kurdish Sufi author
- Hosam Naoum (born 1974), Palestinian Anglican bishop
- Hosam Maher Husein Smadi (born 1990), citizen of Jordan, suspected of planning a terrorist bombing in Dallas, Texas
