= Roger Tatarian =

American journalist

H. Roger Tatarian (1917–1995) was vice-president and editor-in-chief of United Press International, a worldwide news-reporting service that supplied stories to thousands of newspapers, magazines, and broadcast outlets.

== Background and youth ==
Tatarian's family came to the United States from Bitlis, Turkey. The son of a shoemaker, he grew up in Fresno, California amid the same Armenian-American community that produced Pulitzer Prize-winning playwright William Saroyan. At Longfellow Junior High School, Tatarian's English teacher asked him to write for the school paper, the Longfellow Poet. He became sports editor and set his sights on a career in journalism.

== With UPI ==
Tatarian graduated from Fresno State College in 1938 with a degree in political science. He went to work for UPI that same year and became a war correspondent during World War II. His career as a news reporter and editor took him to farflung outposts. Over 34 years with UPI, he worked his way up through the organization, becoming general news manager for Europe, the Middle East, and Africa; bureau chief in both London and Rome; and news editor in Washington, D.C. (During his residency in Rome he became fluent in Italian.) Tatarian eventually became the top editor of the news service, which at the time was a rival to the Associated Press.

== Recognition ==
Tatarian served as a Pulitzer Prize nomination juror in 1960, 1961, and 1985. Awards and honors included the Elijah Parrish Lovejoy Award, a special citation by Ohio University, and an honorary doctorate in law from Colby College in Maine in 1980. He was named a fellow of the Society of Professional Journalists-Sigma Delta Chi in 1972 and was among the first group inducted to the Hall of Fame of the society's New York chapter.

== Active retirement ==
After his retirement from UPI, Tatarian returned to his hometown and joined the journalism faculty of California State University, Fresno. He also served as a writing coach and consultant to newspapers, notably the hometown Fresno Bee. He wrote a regular column for the paper and delivered commentary on local public television. He also served as advisor to various local and state governmental boards, and served on the board of White Ash Broadcasting, the community licensee for KVPR-FM, Valley Public Radio, the NPR affiliate for Central California. Tatarian was especially well known for reaching out to talented young news professionals with advice and encouragement.

Tatarian wrote Day of Mourning, Day of Shame, a collection of essays published by Word Dancer Press.

He and wife Eunice were married for 55 years until his death. Their only child, son Allan Tatarian (1941–2007), was a longtime Fresno radio personality, also known by the on-air name Allan Rogers.
