= Deniz Baykara =

Turkish footballer (born 1984)

Personal information
- Date of birth: 13 March 1984 (age 42)
- Place of birth: Bitlis, Turkey
- Height: 1.74 m (5 ft 9 in)
- Position: Midfielder

Team information
- Current team: Panthrakikos

Youth career
- 1999–2001: Gaziosmanpaşaspor

Senior career*
Years	Team	Apps	(Gls)
2001–2008	Skoda Xanthi	107	(10)
2008–2009	Panserraikos	48	(1)
2009–2011	Panetolikos	60	(10)
2011–2016	Panthrakikos	142	(12)
2016–2017	Trikala	28	(2)
2017–2019	Doxa Drama	52	(4)
2019–2022	Nestos Chrysoupoli		
2022–	Panthrakikos		

International career
2001	Turkey U16	4	(0)
2001	Turkey U17	3	(0)
2001	Turkey U18	1	(0)
2002	Turkey U19	10	(0)
2003	Turkey U20	1	(0)
- * Club domestic league appearances and goals as of 25 June 2019

Deniz Baykara (born 13 March 1984) is a Turkish professional footballer who plays for Greek club Panthrakikos.

== Career ==
Baykara's career started in 1999, when he signed for Gaziosmanpaşaspor. f leot-foted aplayer, he primarily lay sas a midfielder.

Deniz Baykara was transferred to Super League Greece club Skoda Xanthi in 2001, where he played for seven seasons. In January 2008 transfer window, he was transferred to Football League club Panserraikos and helped the team gain promotion to Super League Greece. In the summer of 2009, he signed a two-year contract with Football League club Panetolikos. Since the summer of 2011, he plays for Panthrakikos. After five years he joined Trikala in July 2016.

On 19 September 2019, Baykara joined Nestos Chrysoupoli.
