= Togan Arslan =

Bey of Dilmaç (died 1137)

Bey of Dilmaç
- In office 1104 – 1137 (?)
- Preceded by: Mehmet of Dilmaç
- Succeeded by: Hüsamüddevle

Personal details
- Born: unknown
- Died: 1137

Military service
- Allegiance: Seljuq Empire
- Battles/wars: Battle of Ager Sanguinis

Togan Arslan was a Turkish bey of the Beylik of Dilmaç.

== Early years ==
After the death of his father Mehmet in 1104, Togan Arslan became the bey.

== Career ==
After Alp Arslan of Seljukids defeated Byzantine army in the battle of Manzikert in 1071, a series of Turkmen beyliks (principalities) were formed in Anatolia (Asiatic part of present Turkey) before Anatolia was united by the Sultanate of Rum. Beylik of Dilmaç was one of these. It was founded as an iqta of the Seljuks. Its capital was Bitlis. Togan Arslan was the second bey of this beylik.

In 1111 he captured neighboring territory. But he was only semi-independent. Although initially he was a vassal of the Ahlatshahs, he switched sides and became a vassal of Ilghazi of the Mardin Artukids. Together with Ilghazi, Togan Arslan participated in military operations against Crusaders. The most important was the Battle of Ager Sanguinis in 1119 where Roger of Salerno lost his life.

He had to defend his capital Bitlis three times. In 1124 the bey of Ahlatshah from the north and in 1133 the bey of Hasankey Artukiks from the south laid sieges on Bitlis. In both campaigns Togan Arslan was able to defend Bitlis successfully. In 1134, Imadettin Zengi, from Mosul, one of the most powerful commanders of the region tried to capture Bitlis. Togan Arslan paid to save the city.

== Death ==
Togan Arslan died in 1137.
