= Beylik of Dilmaç =

Turkish principality in the 12th century

The Beylik of Dilmaç (Dimleç or Demleç) was a small principality (Turkish: beylik) founded in the 11th century in what is now modern Turkey.

After the battle of Malazgirt in 1071, the victorious Turkoman tribes led by ghazi warriors began to settle in territory formerly belonging to the Byzantine Empire. One of these warriors was Dilmaç oğlu Mehmet (son of Dilmaç). After the Great Seljuk Empire conquered the city of Bitlis the city was given to Mehmet as an iqta i.e., nonheritable property in 1085. After conquering the nearby town of Erzen (now a hamlet), Mehmet died in 1104. During the reign of his son Togan Arslan, the beylik was no more a vassal of Great Seljuk Empire. In the early years of his reign, Togan Arslan accepted the suzerainty of Artukids and together with Artukids, participated in a number of military operations against Crusaders, the most important being Battle of Ager Sanguinis in 1119 where Roger of Salerno lost his life. After securing independence he also had to fight against other Turkic beyliks like Sökmenli and former suzerain Artukids to defend Bitlis from attacks. After Togan's death (1134 ?) his successors fought against Georgia and Danishmends. As the small principalities were replaced by greater powers the beylik had to accept the suzerainty of Ayyubids, Harzemshah Sultanate, Ilkhanids, and Timur. After the return of Timur, Akkoyunlu Turcomans captured all of their territory probably around the 1410s.

== Rulers ==
Bey	Reign
Dilmaçoğlu Mehmed Bey	1085–1104
Şemsüddevle Togan Arslan	1104–1138
Hüsamüddevle Kurtı	1138–1146
Şemsüddevle Yakut Arslan	1146–1148
Fahrüddevlet Şah	1148–1180
Fülân Bey	1180–1192

== Sources ==
- Mallett, Alex (2014). "Dilmaçoğulları beyliği". In Fleet, Kate; Krämer, Gudrun; Matringe, Denis; Nawas, John; Rowson, Everett (eds.). Encyclopaedia of Islam (3rd ed.). Brill Online. ISSN 1873-9830.
