= Motikan (tribe) =

Kurdish tribal confederation

The Motikan are a Kurdish tribal confederation inhabiting the Bitlis region of Turkey. The Motikan are also referred to as the Motti, Mutki or Motiki. Members of the tribe in the Bitlis region generally speak Zazaki, while those in the Serhat region speak northern Kurmanci.

== History ==
In 1919 the head of the Motikan, Haci Musa, from Bitlis, was elected to the executive committee of the Erzurum Congress, but later became leader of a new Kurdish nationalist party called Azadi (‘freedom’), which rose in rebellion against the government of the new Turkish Republic in 1925 under the leadership of Shaikh Said.
