= Hüseyin Olan =

Turkish politician (born 1959)

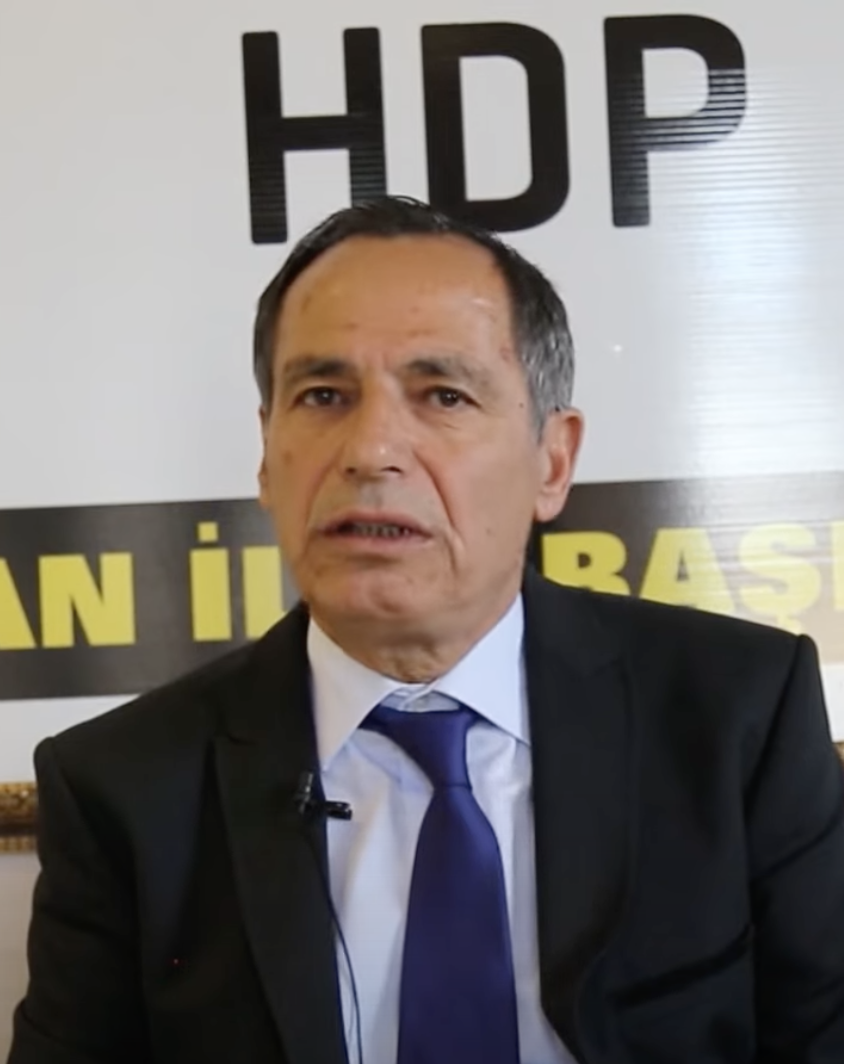

Hüseyin Olan (born 1959, Bitlis, Turkey) is a pharmacist and politician of the Peoples' Equality and Democracy Party (DEM Party). Olan is a former mayor of Bitlis and since June 2023, a member of the Grand National Assembly of Turkey.

== Early life and professional career ==
Hüseyin Olan was born in Bitlis in 1959 where he also attended high school. Olan studied pharmacy at the Ege University in Izmir, from where he graduated in 1986. Following he worked as a pharmacist in Bitlis. From 2001 onwards, Olan became involved in the Chamber of Phramcists and was also a member of the Central Committee of the Pharmacists Union.

== Political career ==
Hüseyin Olan was involved in several pro-Kurdish parties from the People's Democracy Party (HADEP) onwards. Having joined the Peace and Democracy Party (BDP), he was elected the mayor of Bitlis in local elections of March 2014. Under his mayorship, several streets were renamed, one of them after William Saroyan whose Armenian ancestors stemmed from Bitlis. In November 2016, Olan was arrested with Nevin Daşdemir Dağkıran who served as a co-mayor over an investigation on terror related charges. He was sentenced to 7 years and six months imprisonment and was arrested in E type prison of Bitlis. He was released in July 2022. In the parliamentary elections of 2023, Hüseyin Olan was elected to the Grand National Assembly of Turkey, representing Bitlis for the YSP.
