= Bitlis =

Bitlis Baghesh • Բաղեշ
- Municipality
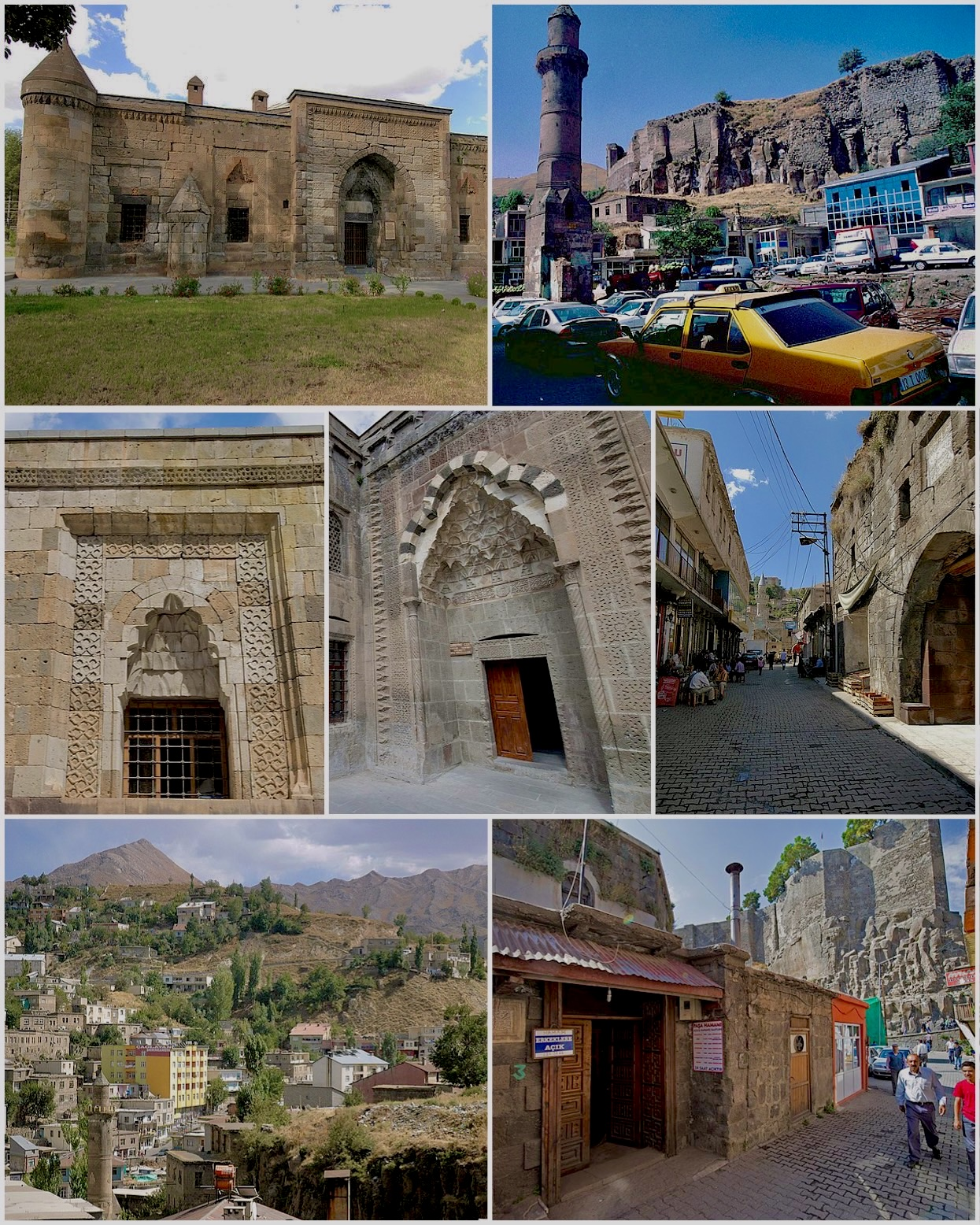
- From top left: Ihasiye Serafhan Medrese • Bitlis Castle; Tourist office • Şerefiye Mosque • Sokak Han; Bitlis skyline • Pasha Hammam

- Coat of arms

- Location within Turkey
- Coordinates: 38°24′00″N 42°06′30″E
- Country: Turkey
- Province: Bitlis
- District: Bitlis

Government
  - Mayor: Nesrullah Tanğlay (AK Party)
- Elevation: 1,545 m (5,069 ft)
- Population (2021): 53,023
- Time zone: UTC+3 (TRT)
- Postal code: 13000
- Website: bitlis.bel.tr

Bitlis (Armenian: Բաղեշ, romanized: Baghesh or Paghesh; Kurdish: Bidlîs; Arabic: بدليس) is a city in southeastern Turkey. It is the seat of Bitlis District and Bitlis Province. Its population is 53,023 (2021). The city is located at an elevation of 1,545 metres, 15 km from Lake Van, in the steep-sided valley of the Bitlis River, a tributary of the Tigris. The local economy is mainly based on agricultural products which include fruits, grain and tobacco. Industry is fairly limited, and deals mainly with leatherworking, manufacture of tobacco products as well as weaving and dyeing of coarse cloth. Bitlis is connected to other urban centres by road, including Tatvan on Lake Van, 25 km to the northeast, and the cities of Muş (Mush), 100 km northwest, and Diyarbakır, 200 km to the west. The climate of Bitlis can be harsh, with long winters and heavy snowfalls. Since the local elections of March 2019, the Mayor of Bitlis is Nesrullah Tanğlay.

Bitlis is populated by Kurds.

== History ==
=== Ancient Bitlis ===
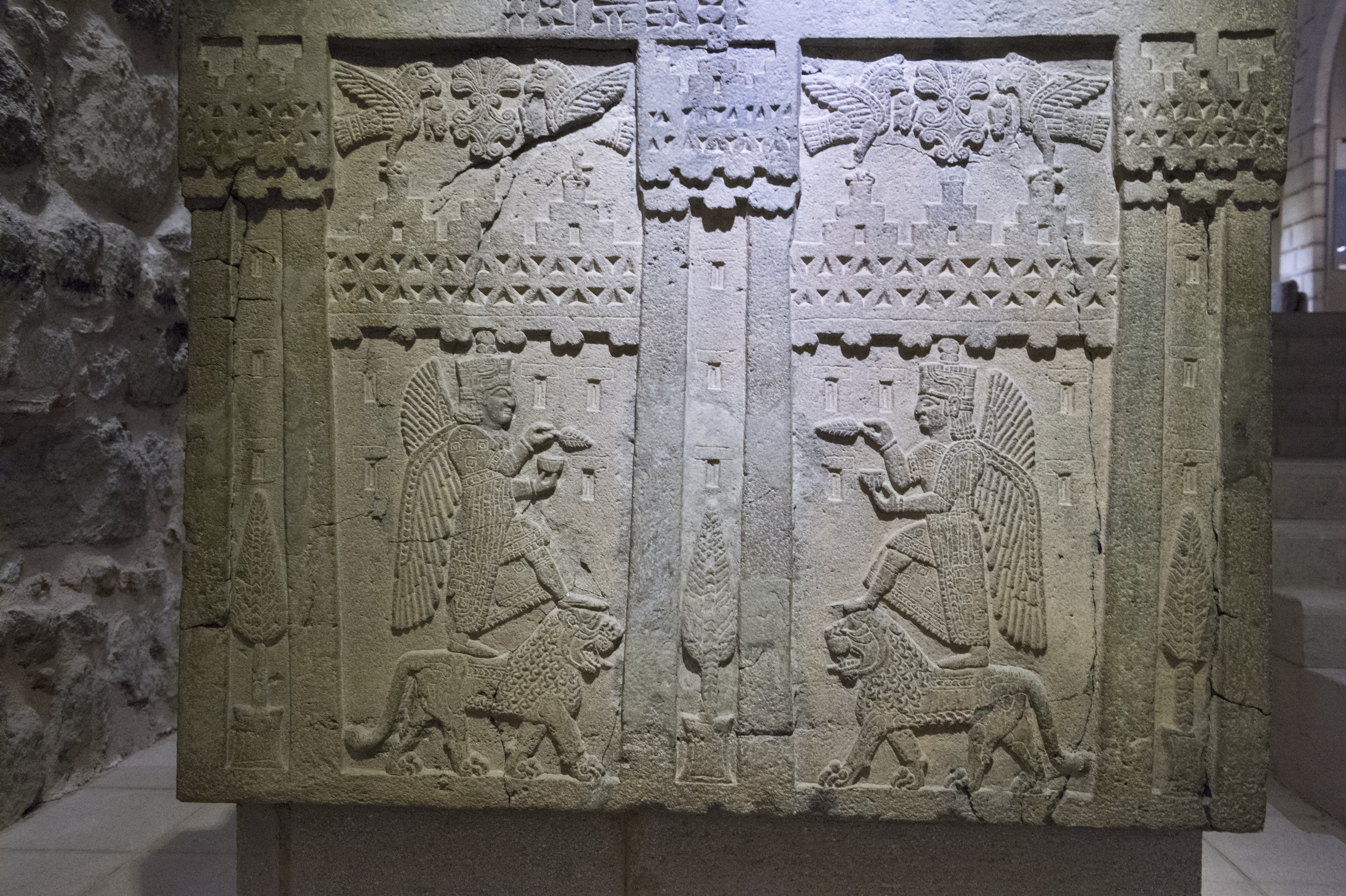
Two winged gods standing on lions are facing each other. The figures are identified as Teişeba, the Storm God. 7th century BC. from Bitlis now in Museum of Anatolian Civilizations

The origin of the name Bitlis is not known. A popular folk etymology explanation, without historical basis, is that it is derived from "Lis/Batlis", the name of a general said to have built Bitlis castle by the order of Alexander the Great. To Armenians, it was known as Balalesa or Baghaghesh, and later Baghesh. According to one popular Armenian folk story, on a cold, wintry day a donkey escaped from its stable and wandered down to the Jlifat valley below. The donkey became trapped in the snow and froze to death. It was only discovered a week later, once the snow had melted; thus, it received the name Pagh Esh, or "Cold Donkey."

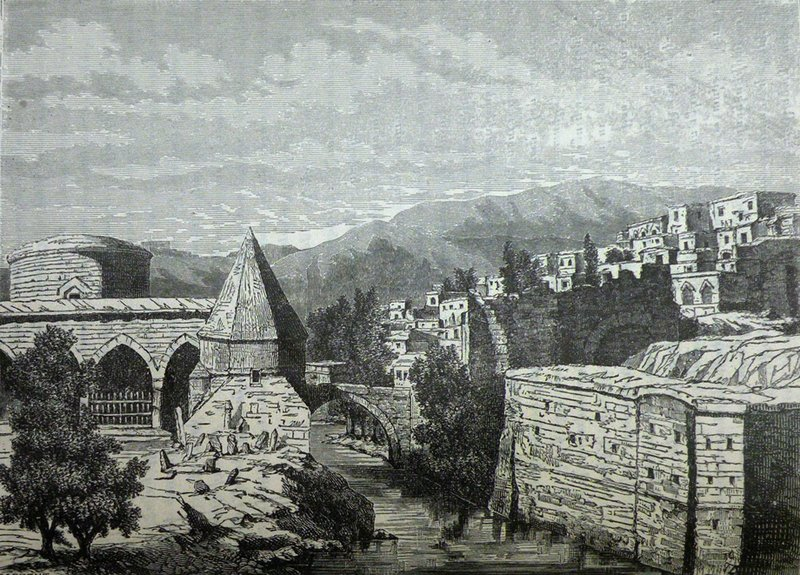
Engraving of Bitlis, 1900

Baghesh was one of the most important cities of the Kingdom of Armenia's province of Aghdznik', and it served as the primary fortress of the province's canton of Salnodzor. Some medieval Armenian writers, such as Anania Shirakatsi and Vardan Areveltsi, later mention it as a part of the canton of Bznunik'. The fortress guarded the Baghesh Pass, which linked the southern reaches of the Armenian plateau to northern Mesopotamia.

=== Medieval Bitlis ===
Under the Byzantine Empire, the town was known as Balaleison. The Arabs conquered Baghesh at the end of the seventh century and it eventually became the capital of the Zurārid emirs of Arzan. Because it was on an important trade route, it prospered greatly.

The next two centuries, however, marked a turbulent period in the town's history. After Bugha al-Kabir's destructive 852-855 campaign in Armenia, the Shaybanid emirs wrested control of Baghesh from the Zurārids; thereafter, in the first quarter of the tenth century, it was taken by the Kaysite emirs of Manzikert. In his 929-30 campaign against the Kaysites, the Byzantine general John Curcuas was able to capture and annex Baghesh. Following the devastation of the Arab emirs in the second half of the tenth century, a great number of Kurds settled in Baghesh and at the end of the tenth century, the city fell into the hands of the Kurdish Marwanid dynasty after breaking from Buyid rule. At the end of the eleventh century, with the collapse of Byzantine power after the Battle of Manzikert, Bitlis fell under the control of Togan Arslan, a subject of the Shah Arman (Also called Ahlatshah) dynasty based in Akhlat' after brief Dilmachoglu rule. It was also ruled by Ayyubid (1207–1231), Khwarezm Shahs (shortly rule in 1230), Sultanate of Rûm (1231–1243) and Ilkhanate (1243–1335).

=== Emirate ===
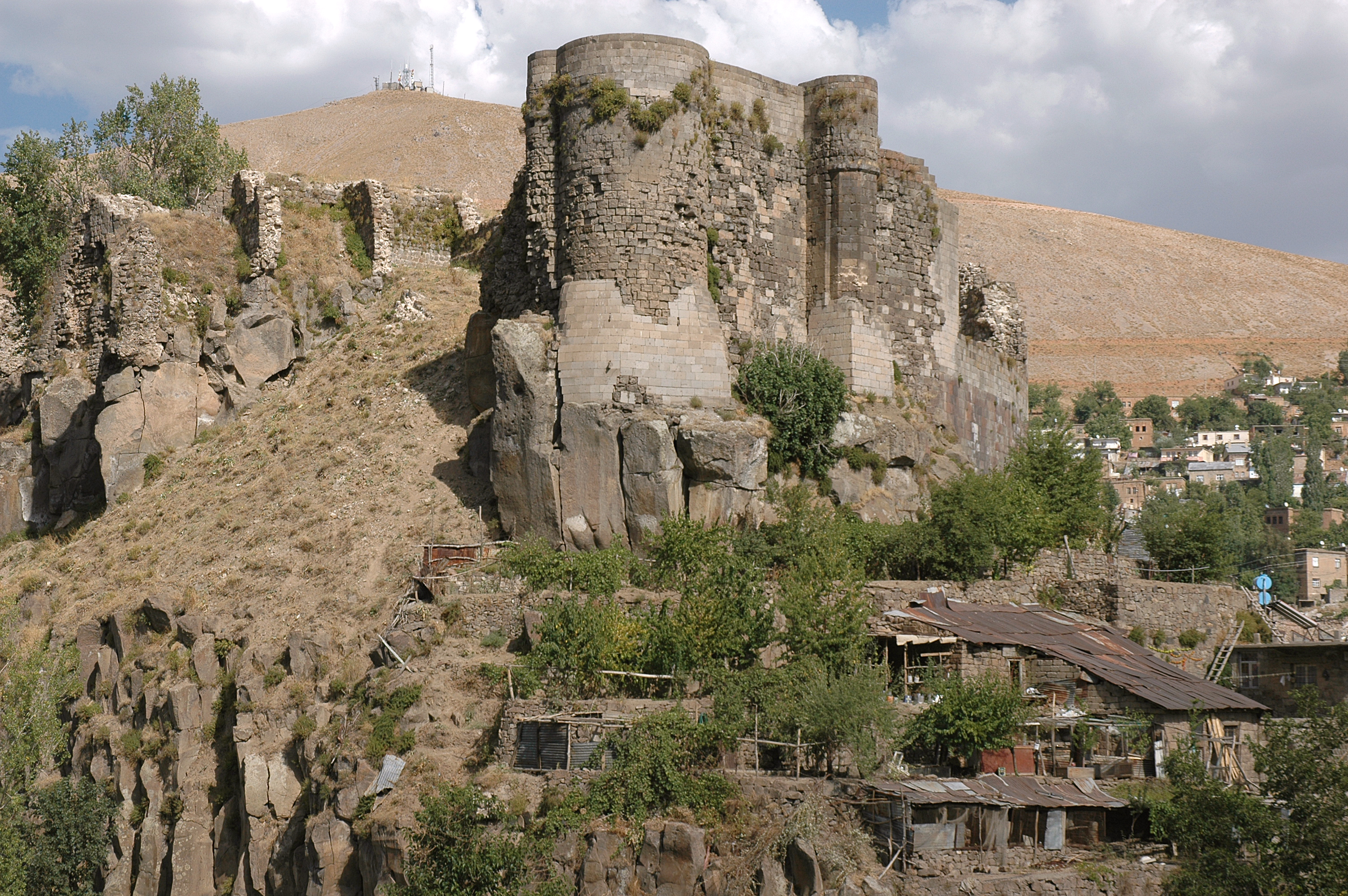
Bitlis Castle

Bitlis was a Kurdish emirate from the 13th to the 19th century. Though often subordinate to a succession of larger powers that ruled the Van region, it always maintained a measure of independence. In the 14th century its emirs, the Kurdish Rusaki family, were vassals of the Karakoyunlu and the emirate's territory also consisted of several smaller emirates: Ahlat, Mush, and Hinis. The emir of Bitlis submitted to Timur in 1394, but later helped the re-establishment of Karakoyunlu control in the region. After the collapse of the Karakoyunlu state, the Bitlis emirate disintegrated. However, in the 1470s it took the Aq Qoyunlu (White Sheep Turkomans) three successive sieges to capture Bitlis and in 1494/95 the Motikan recaptured the town. Armenians formed a large part of the city's population. A number of monasteries were permitted to be built by the Kurdish emirs and during the fifteenth century, Biltis flourished as a center for Armenian manuscript production.

Bitlis was forced to accept a Persian governor during the invasion of the Safavid Shah Ismail, but sided with the Ottoman forces as they approached the region. Its emir, Sheref, later changed his allegiance to the Persians. An Ottoman army besieged Bitlis for three months in 1531/32, but was forced to retire. Sheref was killed in battle in 1533 and his son and successor submitted to the Ottoman Empire. Mush and Hınıs were removed from the Bitlis emirate, becoming separate sanjaks but still with Ruzaki beys. A Jesuit mission was established in Bitlis in 1685. The Ruzakid Kurdish dynasty in Bitlis lasted until 1849, when an Ottoman governor evicted its last emir, Sheref Bey, who was taken to Constantinople as a prisoner. After this, Bitlis was governed by an Ottoman pasha and formed the capital of a vilayet bearing its name.

For centuries, Bitlis and nearby Kurdish principalities were deeply influenced by Persian language and culture through their ties with Persian-centered empires. Persian was the language of administration, used by Sufis, poets, merchants, and scholars. Bitlis’s elites adopted Persian to align with the broader Persianate world. From the 14th century, Persian literary activity thrived in Bitlis, with notable works by Idris-i Bidlisi and Sharaf Khan. Persian was predominant in palace education, madrasas, personal correspondence, and literary and historical writings. Although Ottoman bureaucracy shifted to Turkish in the 16th century, Persian remained in use for communications with Safavid shahs and on inscriptions. Persian manuscripts filled the palace library, and its influence persisted in Bitlis’s cultural and daily life into the 19th century.

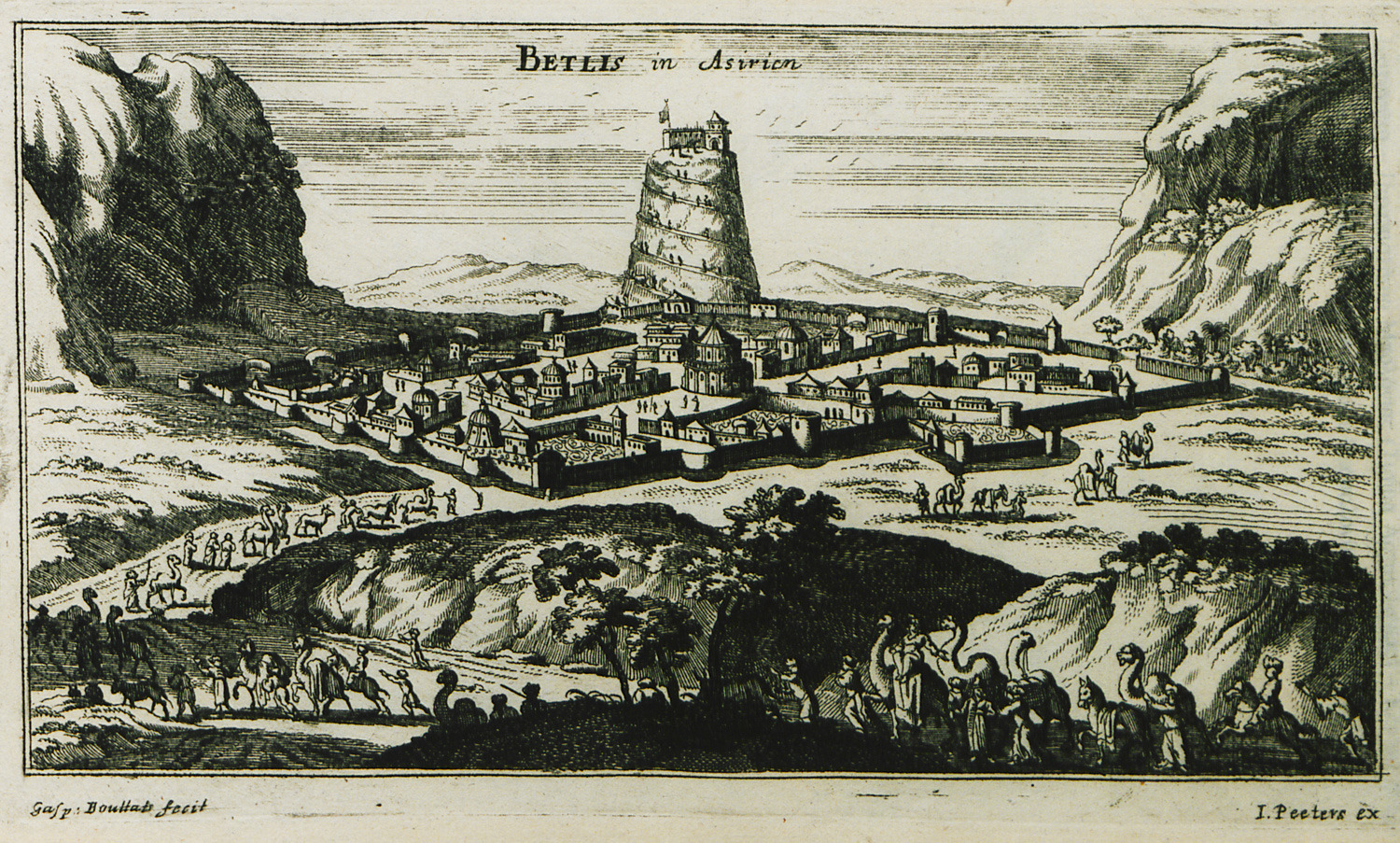
Bitlis in 1690

=== Modern ===
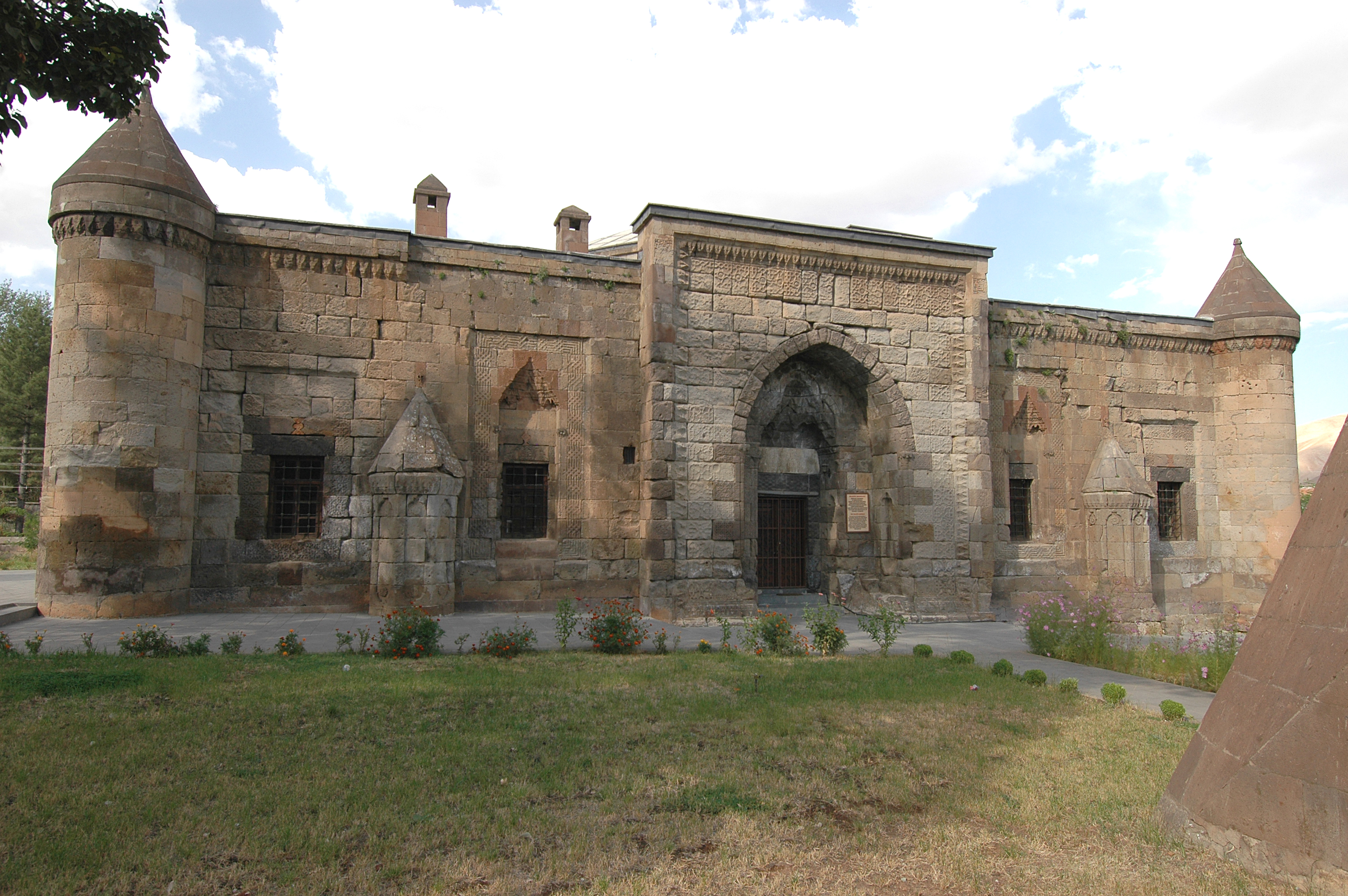
Ihasiye Serafhan Medrese

In 1814 the population of Bitlis town was said to be 12,000 people - one half Muslim, the other half was constituted by Christian Armenians. By 1838 its population was said to be between 15,000 and 18,000 - two thirds Muslim, one third Armenian, and a small minority of Assyrians. In 1898 Lynch considered the population to be close to 30,000, comprising 10,000 Armenians, 300 Assyrians, and the rest Muslim Kurds (both Alevis and Sunnis included). The Armenians had five schools for boys and three for girls. According to Encyclopædia Britannica Eleventh Edition from 1911, the town had 35 thousand people with 12 thousand Armenians, the rest being Kurdish. One third of the population of Bitlis was ethnic Armenian prior to World War I (1914, whereas the majority of the population was Kurdish Muslim (Alevi as well as Sunni). In 1915, during the Armenian genocide, Turks and Kurds, led by Jevdet Bey Pasha, massacred some 15,000 Armenians in Bitlis and the surrounding region. Before the forced relocations (Tehcir) by Ottoman government, the Christian population of Bitlis was mainly made up of Armenians and Assyrians however during the Armenian genocide, both the Armenian and Assyrian population were exterminated coinciding with the Assyrian genocide also.

In February 1916, as part of the Caucasus Campaign, Imperial Russian forces launched an offensive to capture Mush and Bitlis. Mush fell on February 16. At Bitlis, the Turkish positions were in a strong location on the outskirts of the town and could not be outflanked because of the narrowness of the valley. On the night of March 2–3, during a blizzard, the Russian 8th Caucasian Rifles advanced silently and, after several hours of hand-to-hand fighting, took the Turkish positions with 1,000 prisoners. The Turks then abandoned Bitlis, retreating towards Siirt. The Russian forces and intelligence officers found evidence of the massacres of Christians by the Kurds and Turks in 1915.

In August 1916 the Turkish Second Army started an offensive against the Russian front in eastern Turkey. On August 2, the Ottoman 16th Corps, together with strong Kurdish irregulars' support, attacked Bitlis and Mush. Fearing encirclement General Nazarbekov, the Russian commander, abandoned Bitlis on August 5. When Mush also fell, he decided to abandon Tatvan and the whole Mush valley and retreat to Ahlat. Around 18 August, the Russians having been reinforced, were able to counter-attack. By September the Turkish offensive was stalled and then turned. Nazarbekov advanced as the Turkish forces withdrew from Tatvan and Mush, but he did not have the available forces to hold Bitlis as winter approached. The Russian February Revolution in the spring of 1917 prevented any further Russian gains.

== Tourism ==
The main places with tourism potential in Bitlis are Lake Nemrut, Ahlat Seljuk Cemetery, Ahlat Museum, Mount Süphan, Güroymak Hot Springs and Lake Nazik.

== Description ==
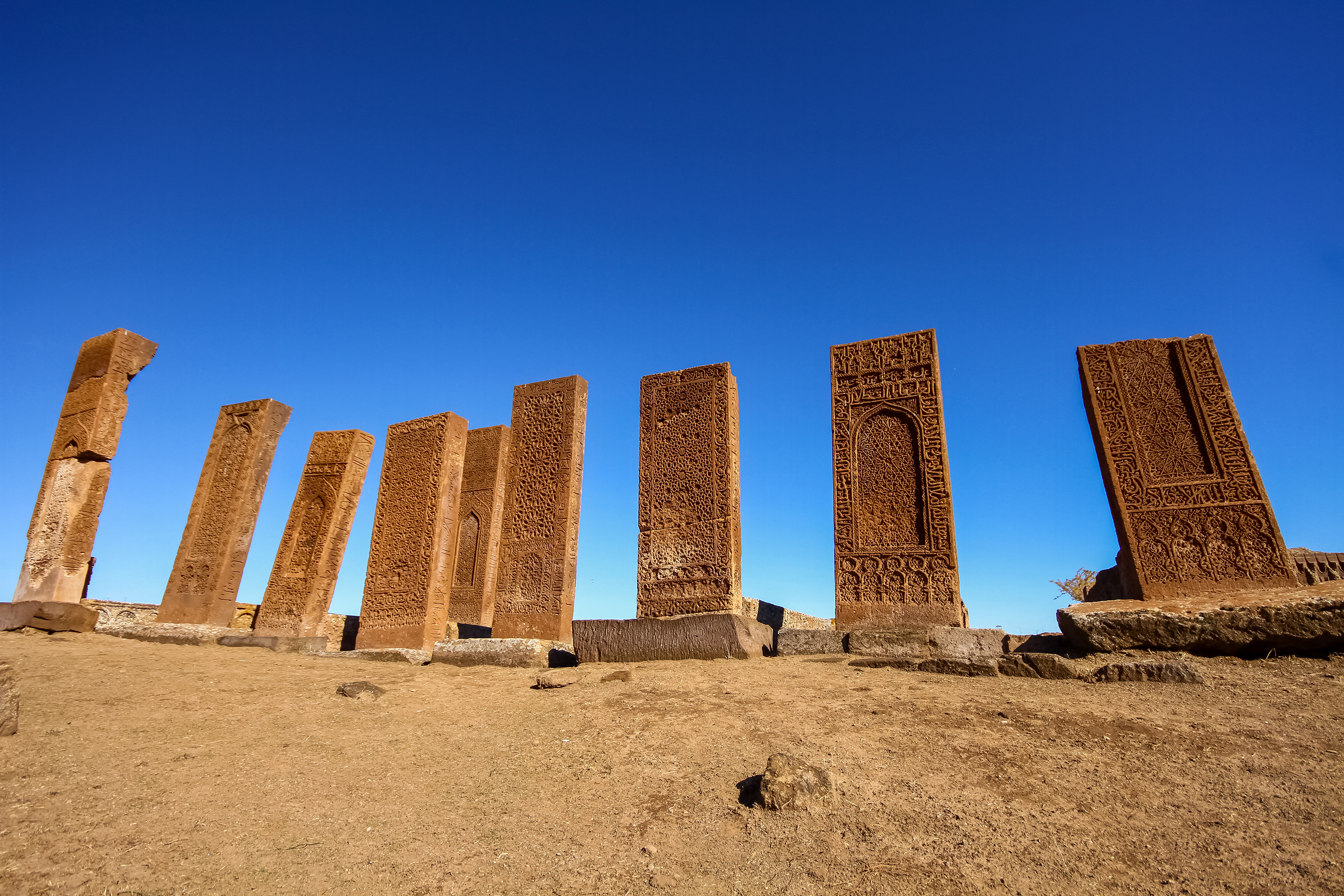
Tombstones of Ahlat in Bitlis province

Bitlis preserves more medieval and traditional architecture than any other town in eastern Turkey. They are of a high quality and are mostly constructed from locally quarried light-brown stone, sometimes called Ahlat stone.

The town contains a large number of late-medieval Islamic buildings in the form of mosques, madrassas, and tombs. Also commercial buildings such as "Han's Caravanserais. Commissioned mostly by its local Kurdish rulers, the architectural style of these buildings is very conservative and similar to much earlier Seljuq-period structures. Important monuments include the 12th-century Ulu Mosque with its 15th-century minaret, and the Gokmeydani Medresesi and Sherefiye Mosque from the sixteenth century. Until 1915 there were five Armenian monasteries and several churches in Bitlis – only a 19th-century Armenian church survives, now used as a warehouse.

Bitlis is also notable for its many old houses. These are built of cut stone and are often large and impressive structures. Most have two stories, but three stories are also found. Ground floors were generally intended for storage and stables, with the residential quarters on the upper floors. Ground floor rooms have few windows, upper floors are well lit. Roofs are flat and covered with beaten clay. Unlike traditional houses in nearby Erzurum or Van, Bitlis houses do not have bay windows and balconies.

== Demographics ==
On the eve of the First World War, the town had about 30,000 inhabitants: two-thirds Kurds and one-third Armenians. All Armenians were massacred by the Turkish regular army led by Djevdet Bey as part of the Armenian genocide.

Mother tongue, Bitlis District, 1927 Turkish census
Turkish	Arabic	Kurdish	Circassian	Armenian	Unknown or other languages
9,350	55	10,344	2	3	1

Religion, Bitlis District, 1927 Turkish census
Muslim	Armenian	Jewish	Other Christian
19,752	2	1	–

The demographic composition of Bitlis has been shaped by the predominantly Kurdish settlement of the region. Sociolinguistic research on language demographics in Turkey has identified Bitlis as one of the provinces with a strong Kurdish-speaking majority, with Kurmanji (Northern Kurdish) as the principal language of the population.

== Gallery ==
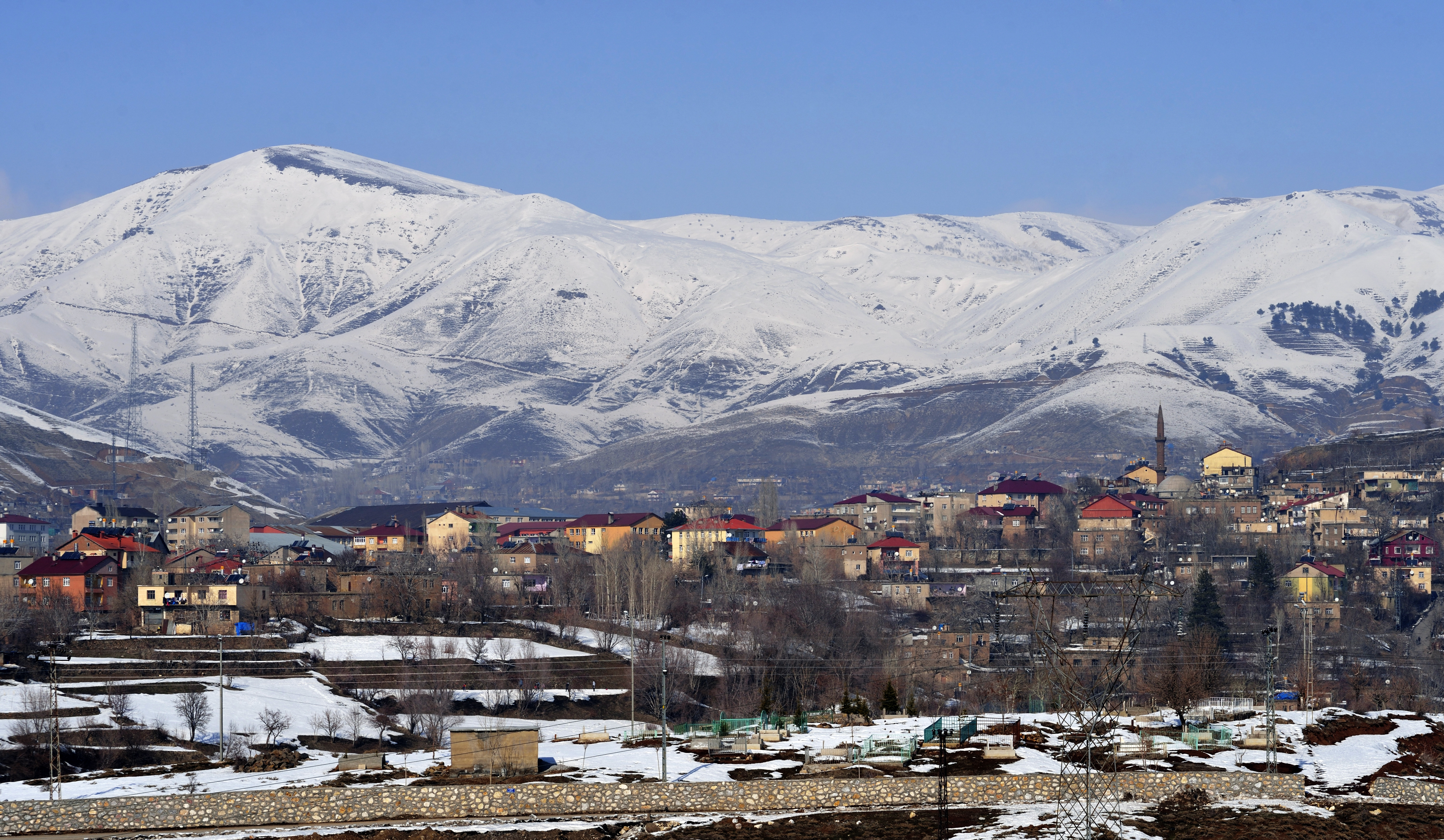
Bitlis

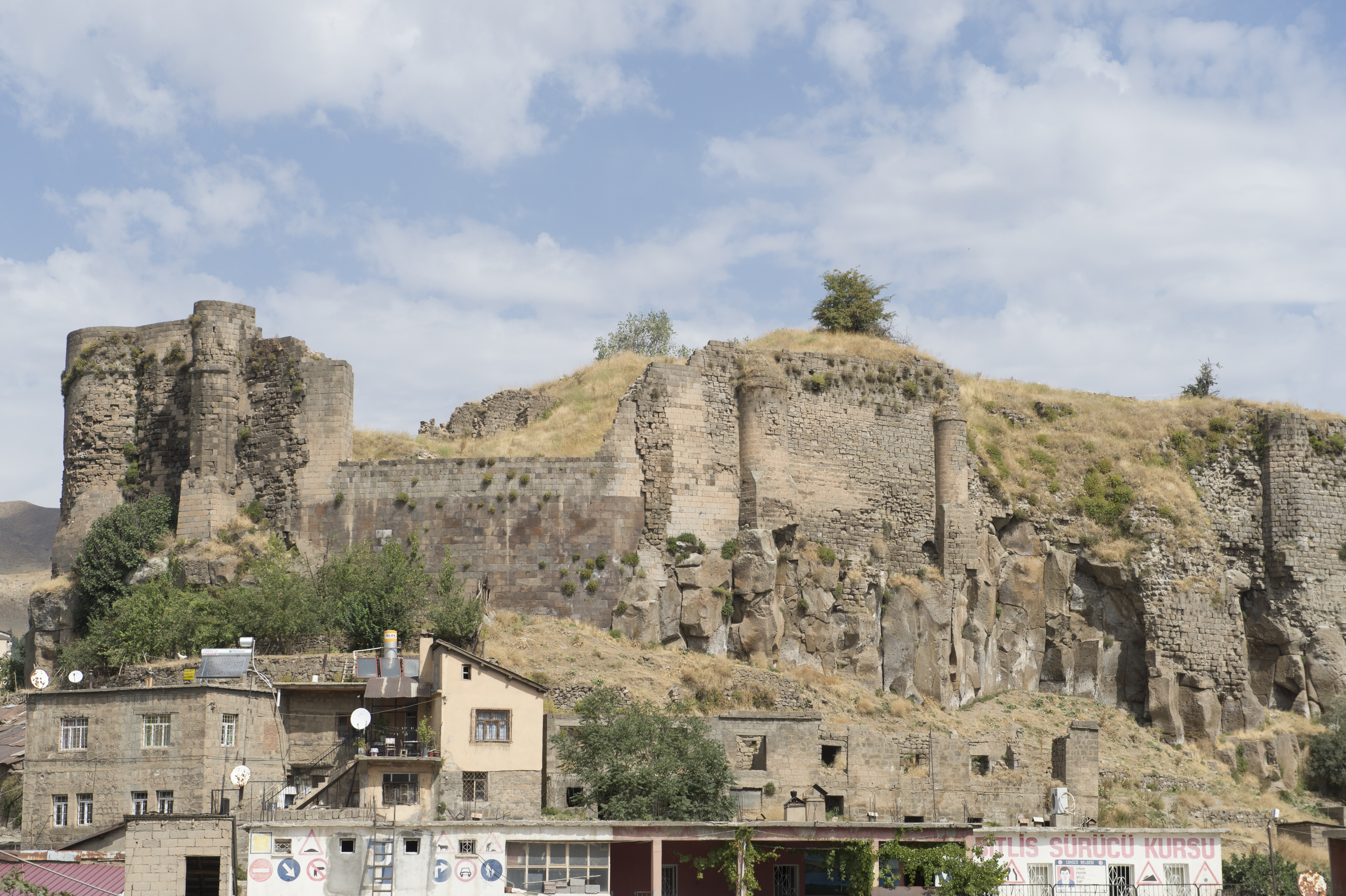
Bitlis Castle (Bitlis Kalesi)

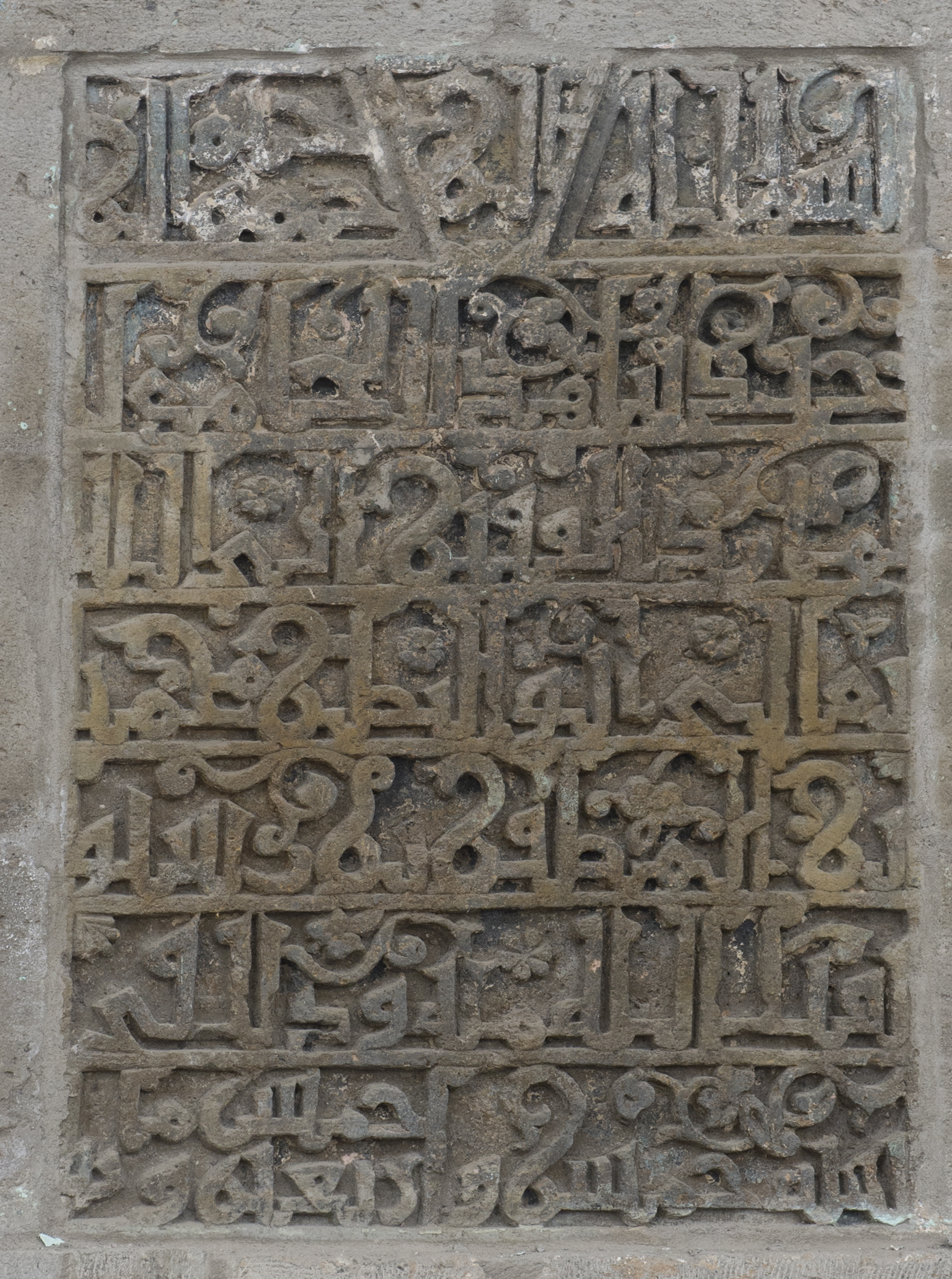
Ulu Cami text

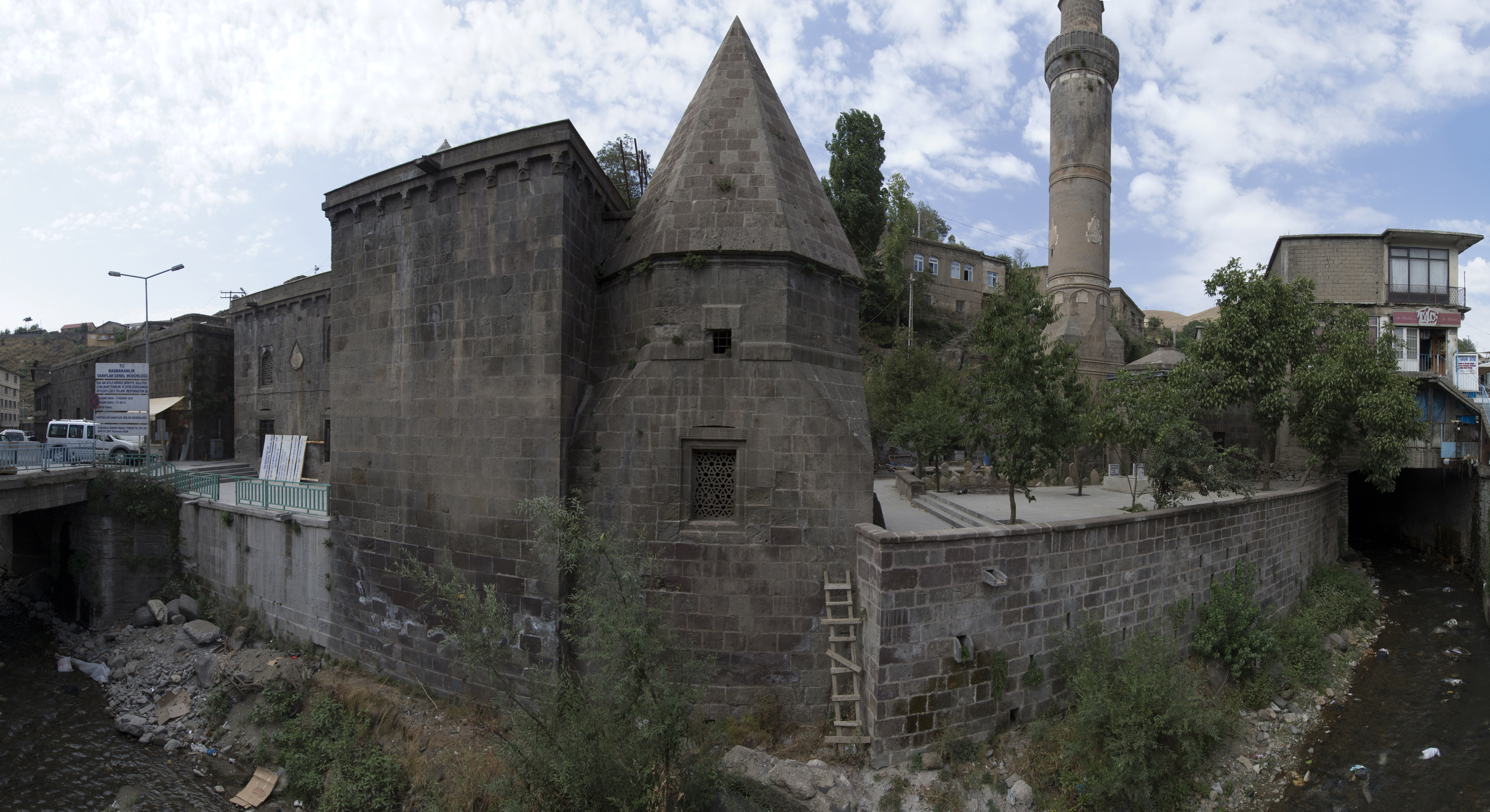
Bitlis Şerefiye Mosque

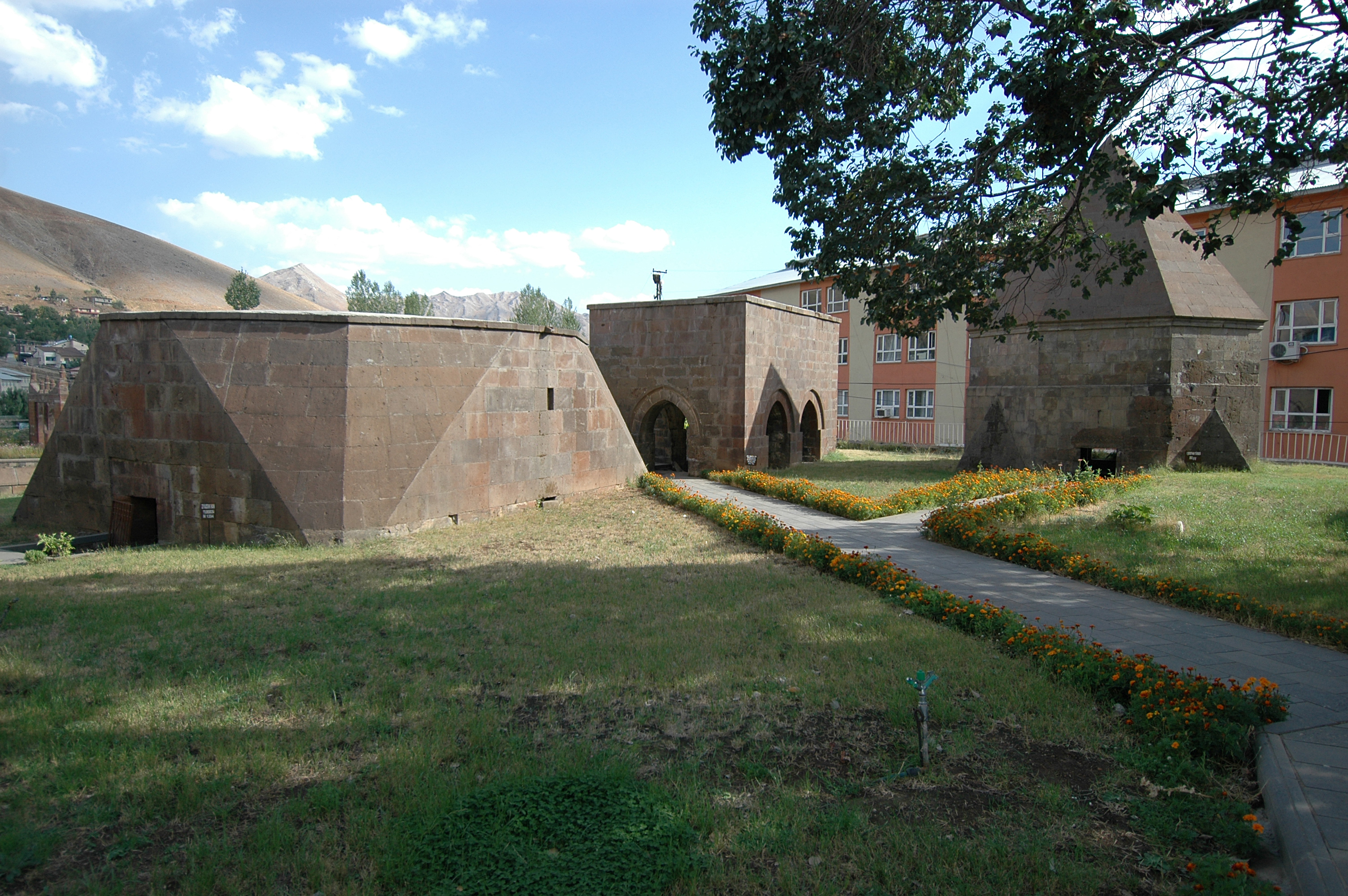
Ihasiye Şerafhan Medresesi view of türbes

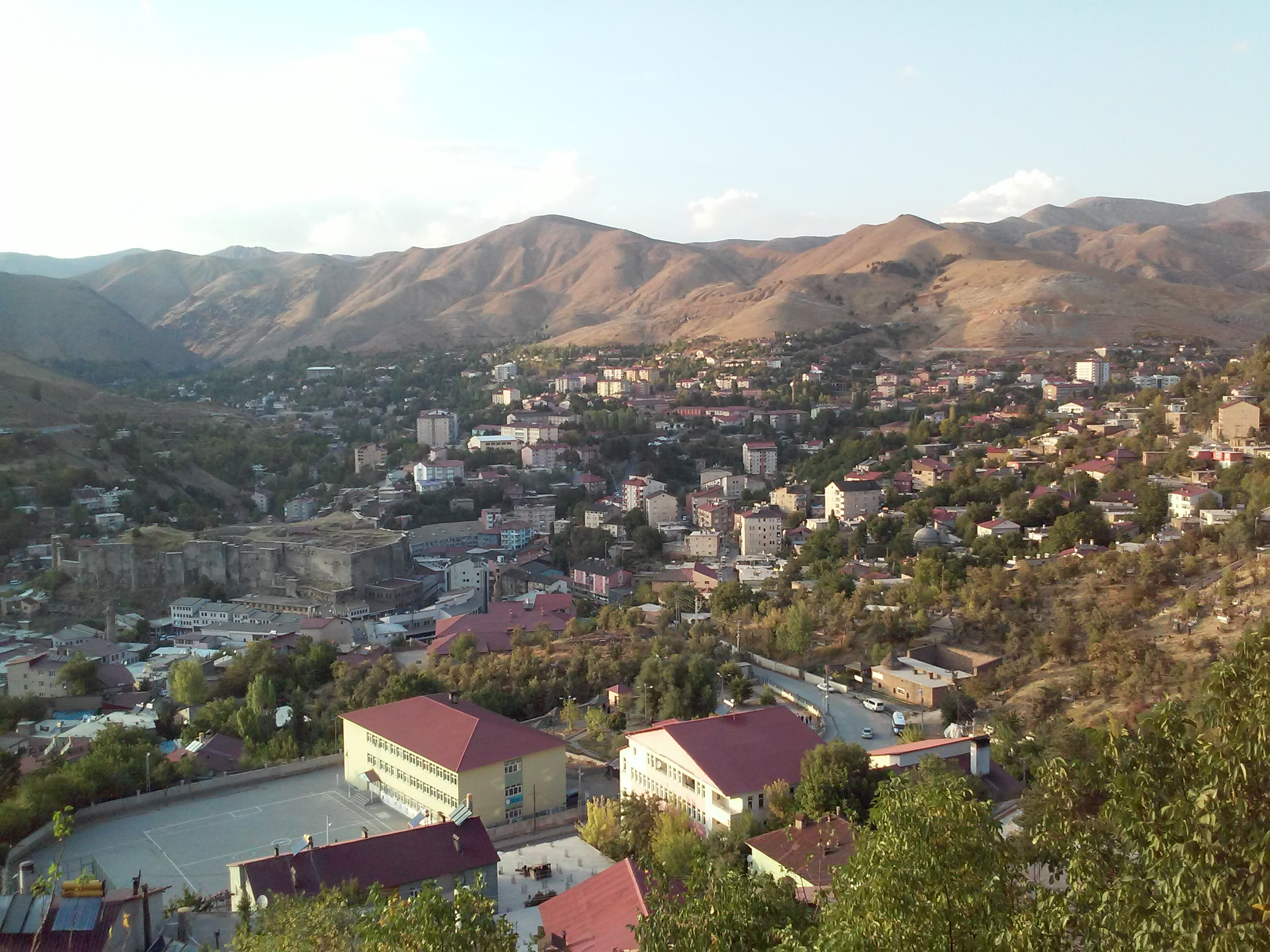
Bitlis view

== Climate ==
Bitlis has a Mediterranean-influenced humid continental climate (Köppen: Dsa, Trewartha: Dca). Bitlis has hot, dry summers and cold, very snowy winters. Highest snow depth recorded in Bitlis is 343 cm (135 inches).

Climate data for Bitlis (1991–2020, extremes 1959–2023)
Month	Jan	Feb	Mar	Apr	May	Jun	Jul	Aug	Sep	Oct	Nov	Dec	Year
Record high °C (°F)	10.1 (50.2)	21.9 (71.4)	16.7 (62.1)	22.3 (72.1)	27.4 (81.3)	31.5 (88.7)	34.6 (94.3)	34.3 (93.7)	34.0 (93.2)	26.4 (79.5)	21.7 (71.1)	13.3 (55.9)	34.6 (94.3)
Mean daily maximum °C (°F)	−0.9 (30.4)	0.9 (33.6)	5.1 (41.2)	11.9 (53.4)	17.7 (63.9)	24.1 (75.4)	28.9 (84.0)	29.4 (84.9)	25.0 (77.0)	16.8 (62.2)	8.9 (48.0)	1.9 (35.4)	14.1 (57.4)
Daily mean °C (°F)	−4.8 (23.4)	−3.4 (25.9)	1.1 (34.0)	6.9 (44.4)	12.5 (54.5)	18.1 (64.6)	22.7 (72.9)	22.8 (73.0)	18.4 (65.1)	11.4 (52.5)	4.5 (40.1)	−1.7 (28.9)	9.0 (48.2)
Mean daily minimum °C (°F)	−8.6 (16.5)	−7.5 (18.5)	−2.6 (27.3)	2.5 (36.5)	7.3 (45.1)	11.5 (52.7)	15.5 (59.9)	15.9 (60.6)	11.6 (52.9)	6.5 (43.7)	0.8 (33.4)	−5.0 (23.0)	4.0 (39.2)
Record low °C (°F)	−24.1 (−11.4)	−21.3 (−6.3)	−20.3 (−4.5)	−10.0 (14.0)	0.1 (32.2)	5.2 (41.4)	8.1 (46.6)	9.9 (49.8)	0.0 (32.0)	−0.6 (30.9)	−10.0 (14.0)	−20.8 (−5.4)	−24.1 (−11.4)
Average precipitation mm (inches)	169.3 (6.67)	111.0 (4.37)	170.4 (6.71)	117.6 (4.63)	103.2 (4.06)	15.5 (0.61)	9.8 (0.39)	6.8 (0.27)	22.8 (0.90)	90.6 (3.57)	87.9 (3.46)	141.9 (5.59)	1,046.8 (41.21)
Average precipitation days	15.44	12.78	16.56	14.78	14.89	5.67	2.78	1.44	2.11	9.89	10.33	13.67	120.3
Average snowy days	16.13	11.13	13.88	3.25	0.25	0	0	0	0	0.38	2.75	9.25	57.02
Mean monthly sunshine hours	74.4	96.1	158.1	177.0	229.4	279.0	303.8	300.7	276.0	167.4	87.0	62.0	2,210.9
Mean daily sunshine hours	2.4	3.4	5.1	5.9	7.4	9.3	9.8	9.7	9.2	5.4	2.9	2.0	6.0
Source 1: Turkish State Meteorological Service
Source 2: Meteomanz (snowy days 2017-2024)

== Economy ==
Historically, Bitlis produced wheat, which the British, in 1920, described as being "particularly excellent." However, poor trade routes in the area during the early 20th century meant that the wheat was mainly produced and used by locals. During this time, the British stated that the people of Bitlis were unable to use all of the wheat they produced, and most was "left to rot in the underground storehouses."

== Notable individuals ==
- Badh ibn Dustak (died 991) Kurdish tribal leader
- Idris Bitlisi (1457-1520) Ottomon civil servant
- Hosam al-Din Ali Bitlisi (died 1494/5) Kurdish Sufi author
- Sharafkhan Bidlisi (1543-1603) Kurdish noble and writer
- Grace Knapp (1870-1953) American missionary who witnessed the Armenian genocide in eastern Turkey
- Said Nursi (1878-1960) Kurdish Sunni Muslim Nur movement tariqa sheikh.
- Levon Aghababyan (1887-1915) Armenian mathematician
- Ihsan Nuri (1892-1976) Kurdish soldier and politician, former officer of the Ottoman and Turkish Army, and one of the leaders of the Ararat rebellion as the generalissimo of the Kurdish National Forces.
- Paul Paul (1894-1979) Armenian politician
- Roger Tatarian (1917-1995) Armenian journalist
- Fuat Sezgin (1924-2018) Historian of Science, Orientalist.
- Kâmran İnan (Hizan, Bitlis, 1929) Turkish politician, diplomat, and scholar was from Bitlis.
- Salih Mirzabeyoğlu, (1950-2018), the Kurdish poet and the leader of Islamic fundamentalism group of İBDA-C.
- Tekin Bingöl (born 1955) Turkish politician
- Ersin Ayrłksa (1956-) Turkish alpine skier
- Metin Yüksel (1958-1979) Kurdish-Turkish political and social Islamist activist
- Hüseyin Olan (born 1959) Turkish politician
- Onur Akın, (born 1967), the most popular protest music and Turkish folk music artist.
- Deniz Baykara (born 1984) Turkish footballer
- Nurcihan Ekinci (born 1988) Turkish Para Taekwondo practitioner
- Ayetullah Aslanhan (born 2001) Turkish long-distance runner

== Mayors of Bitlis ==
- 1977-1980 and 1984-1994 Ahmet Muzaffer Geylani CHP, SODEP, SHP, ANAP
- 1994-2004 Yaşar Burhan Refah Party, FP, Saadet Party
- 2004-2009 Cevdet Özdemir AK Party
- 2009-2014 Fehmi Alaydın AK Party
- 2014-2016 Hüseyin Olan BDP, DBP
- 2016-2017 Ahmet Çınar Independent
- 2017-2019 Oktay Çağatay Independent
- 2019-present Nesrullah Tanğlay AK Party
