= Hosam al-Din Ali Bitlisi =

Kurdish Sufi author

Hosam al-Din Ali Bitlisi Nurbakhshi (died 1494/95) was a Kurdish Sufi author. He was the father of the noted historian Idris Bitlisi.

According to Tahsin Yazici / Encyclopædia Iranica, nothing is known about Hosam al-Din's early life; however, he adds that his works bear evidence to the fact that he was well educated and was well versed in both Persian and Arabic. Either prior to completing his education, or after that, Hosam al-Din became a member of the Sufi Nurbakhshi order. The Nurbakhshi order itself was a branch of the Kobrawiya order (founded by Najm al-Din Kobra). Yazici considers it likely that Hosam al-Din became a follower and in turn the eventual successor of the so-called "actual" founder of the order; Mohammad Nurbakhsh (died 1465).

He died in Bitlis in 1494/95, and was buried there.

== Works ==
In Persian:

- Sharh-e Golshan-e raz
- Atwar-e sab'a-ye qalb
- Kalemat va Maqalat

In Arabic:

- Jame al-tanzil wa ta'wil
- Sharh-e estelahat al-sufiya

== Sources ==
- Yazici, Tahsin (2004). "ḤOSĀM-AL-DIN ʿALI BEDLISI". Encyclopaedia Iranica, Vol. XII, Fasc. 5. p. 490.
